= List of people who died on the Presidential Range =

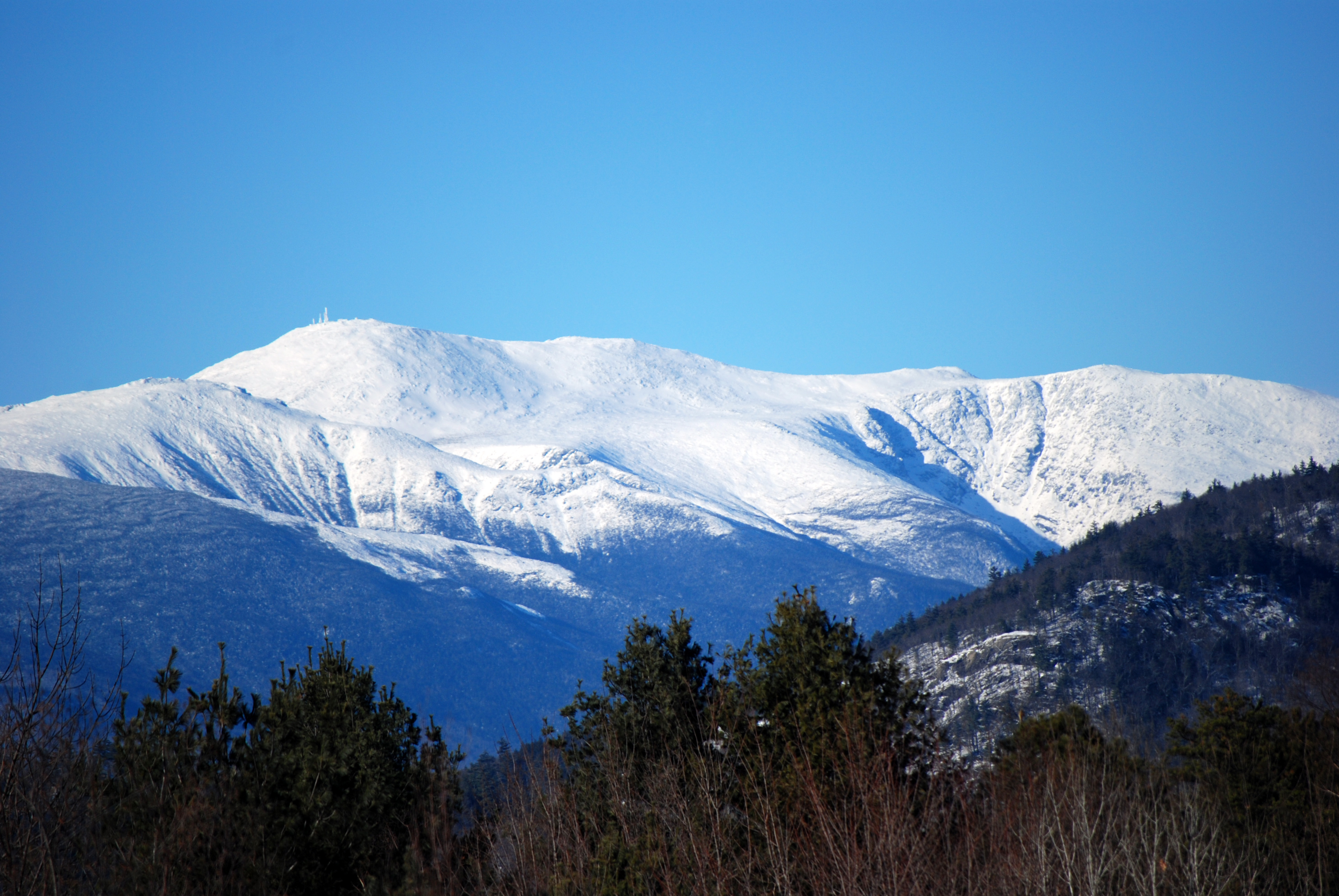
Mount Washington from Intervale, with Huntington Ravine visible on the right of the image

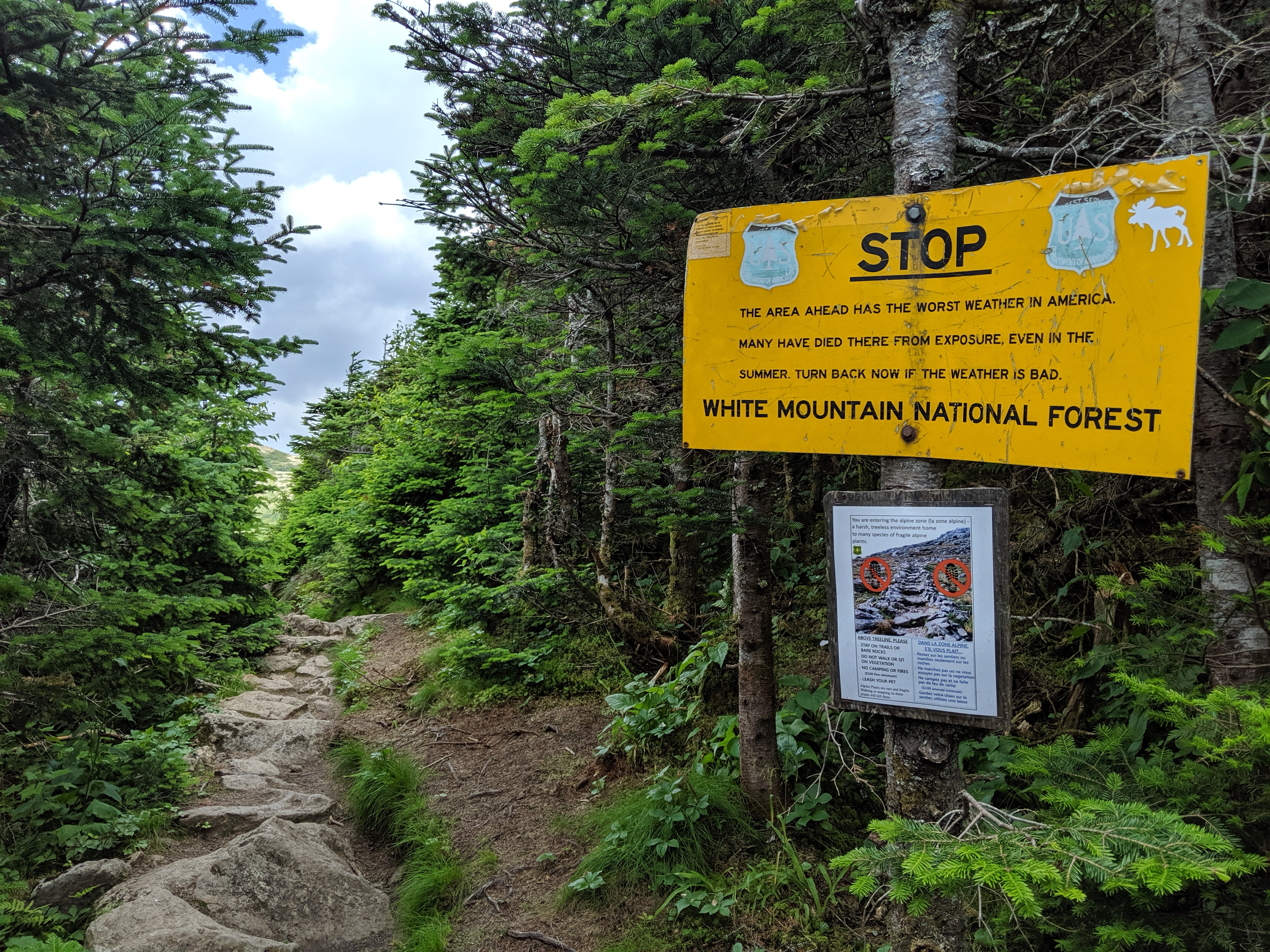
Sign posted by the US Forest Service in the Presidential Range of the White Mountain National Forest warning of the dangerous conditions beyond.

The Presidential Range in the White Mountains of New Hampshire consist of a series of mountains whose maximum elevation reaches 6,288 feet (1,917 m) and represent some of the highest mountains in the United States east of the Mississippi River. Fatalities in this area are dominated by those that occur on Mount Washington, the highest peak in the range. It is notorious for its unpredictable and inclement weather, making it one of the deadliest mountains in the continental United States. Due to its unique location relative to other geographic features, it holds the world record for highest recorded surface wind speed not within a tropical cyclone. Huntington Ravine, on the mountain's eastern face, has been classified by local search and rescue teams as the most dangerous hike in the White Mountains due to high exposure and steep rock climbs and scrambles over cliff faces.

The New Hampshire Fish and Game Department conducts an average of 200 rescues a year for hikers in need of assistance. Mt. Washington itself has been listed among the ten deadliest mountains in the world.

== Fatalities ==
The following table lists 178 known fatalities and missing persons within the Presidential Range. Many fatalities occur during spring, autumn and winter, particularly when the weather in the surrounding lower elevations is slightly above average for the season. Most fatalities are a result of exposure or falls.

| Name | Date | Age | State or country of origin | Cause of death | Location | Mountain | Ref(s) |
|---|---|---|---|---|---|---|---|
| Frederick Strickland | October 19, 1849 | 29 | United Kingdom | Hypothermia | Clay Brook | Washington | |
| Lizzie Bourne | September 13, 1855 | 23 | Maine | Hypothermia | Summit | Washington | |
| Benjamin Chandler | August 7, 1856 | 75 | Delaware | Hypothermia | Summit | Washington | |
| J. M. Thompson | October 4, 1869 | Unknown | New Hampshire | Drowning | Peabody River | —N/a | |
| William Stevens | February 26, 1872 | Unknown | Unknown | Natural Causes | Summit | Washington | |
| William Seely | July 3, 1873 | 29 | New York | Accident | Cog Railway | Washington | |
| Harry W. Hunter | September 3, 1874 | 21 | Pennsylvania | Hypothermia | Summit | Washington | |
| Ann M Ives Chichester | July 3, 1880 | Unknown | Michigan | Accident | Mount Washington Carriage Road | Washington | |
| Sewall Faunce | July 24, 1886 | 15 | Massachusetts | Falling snow arch | Tuckerman Ravine | Washington | |
| Ewald Weiss | August 24, 1890 | 24 | Germany | Missing | Unknown | Washington | |
| William Buckingham Curtis | June 30, 1900 | 63 | New York | Hypothermia | Lakes of the Clouds | Washington | |
| Allan Ormsbee | June 30, 1900 | 28 | New York | Hypothermia | Summit | Washington | |
| Alexander Cusick | August 23, 1900 | Unknown | Vermont | Accident | Cog Railway | Washington | |
| John Keenan | September 18, 1912 | 18 | Massachusetts | Missing | Summit | Washington | |
| Harry Clauson | August 5, 1919 | 19 | Massachusetts | Accident | Cog Railway | Washington | |
| Jack Lonigan | August 5, 1919 | 21 | Massachusetts | Accident | Cog Railway | Washington | |
| Harriman | November 1927 | Unknown | Unknown | Drowning | Jefferson Brook | —N/a | |
| Elmer Lyman | April 1928 | Unknown | New Hampshire | Hypothermia | Pinkham Notch | Washington | |
| Herbert J. Young | December 1, 1928 | 18 | Missouri | Hypothermia | Ammonoosuc Ravine Trail | Washington | |
| Daniel Rossiter | July 20, 1929 | Unknown | Massachusetts | Accident | Cog Railway | Washington | |
| Oysten Kladstad | July 30, 1929 | Unknown | New York | Drowning | Dry River | —N/a | |
| Henry B. Bigelow Jr. | September 18, 1931 | 19 | Massachusetts | Falling ice | Huntington Ravine | Washington | |
| Ernest W. McAdams | January 31, 1932 | 22 | Massachusetts | Hypothermia | Cog Railway | Washington | |
| Joseph B. Chadwick | January 31, 1932 | 22 | Massachusetts | Hypothermia | Cog Railway route | Washington | |
| Simon Joseph | June 18, 1933 | 19 | Massachusetts | Hypothermia | Old Crawford Path | Washington | |
| Rupert Marden | November 11, 1933 | 21 | Massachusetts | Hypothermia | Tuckerman Ravine | Washington | |
| Jerome R. Pierce | September 9, 1934 | 17 | Vermont | Drowning | Peabody River | —N/a | |
| John W. Fowler | April 1, 1936 | 19 | New York | Fall | Tuckerman Ravine | Washington | |
| Grace Sturgess | May 23, 1936 | 24 | Massachusetts | Falling ice | Tuckerman Ravine | Washington | |
| Harry A. Wheeler | July 4, 1937 | 55 | Massachusetts | Heart attack | Caps Ridge Trail | Jefferson | |
| Joseph Caggiano | August 24, 1938 | 17 | New York | Hypothermia | Gulfside Trail | Adams | |
| Edwin McIntire | June 9, 1940 | 19 | New Jersey | Fall into a crevasse | Tuckerman Ravine | Washington | |
| Louis Carl Haberland | October 13, 1941 | 27 | Massachusetts | Hypothermia | Caps Ridge Trail | Jefferson | |
| John Neal | April 7, 1943 | Unknown | Massachusetts | Injury while skiing the Little Headwall | Tuckerman Ravine | Washington | |
| Phyllis Wilbur | June 3, 1948 | 16 | Maine | Injuries sustained from fall while skiing | Tuckerman Ravine | Washington | |
| Paul Schiller | May 1, 1949 | Unknown | Massachusetts | Fall while skiing on Headwall | Tuckerman Ravine | Washington | |
| Tor Staver | February 2, 1952 | Unknown | Norway | Injuries sustained from fall while skiing | Tuckerman Ravine | Washington | |
| Raymond Davis | August 23, 1952 | 50 | Massachusetts | Hypothermia | Tuckerman Ravine | Washington | |
| Philip Longnecker | January 31, 1954 | 25 | Ohio | Avalanche / Hypothermia | Tuckerman Ravine | Washington | |
| Jacques Parysko | January 31, 1954 | 23 | Massachusetts | Avalanche / Hypothermia | Tuckerman Ravine | Washington | |
| Aaron Leve | February 19, 1956 | 28 | Canada / Massachusetts (Note: Aaron held dual citizenship) | Avalanche | Tuckerman Ravine | Washington | |
| Thomas Flint | June 2, 1956 | 21 | Massachusetts | Fall | Unknown | Madison | |
| John J. Ochab | September 1, 1956 | 37 | New Jersey | Fall | Unknown | Clay | |
| William Brigham | May 17, 1958 | 28 | Canada (Quebec) | Falling ice | Tuckerman Ravine | Washington | |
| Paul Zanet | July 19, 1958 | 24 | Massachusetts | Hypothermia | Crawford Path | Washington | |
| Judy March | July 19, 1958 | 17 | Massachusetts | Hypothermia | Crawford Path | Washington | |
| Anthony Amico | August 22, 1959 | 44 | Massachusetts | Heart attack | Tuckerman Ravine | Washington | |
| Armand Falardeau | June 2, 1962 | 42 | Connecticut | Hypothermia | Clay Loop Trail | Clay | |
| Alfred K. Dickinson | September 12, 1962 | 67 | Massachusetts | Hypothermia | Nelson Crag | Washington | |
| Hugo Stadtmueller | April 4, 1964 | 28 | Massachusetts | Avalanche | Huntington Ravine | Washington | |
| John Griffin | April 4, 1964 | 39 | Massachusetts | Avalanche | Huntington Ravine | Washington | |
| Remi J. Bourdages | May 3, 1964 | 38 | Massachusetts | Heart attack | Tuckerman Ravine | Washington | |
| Daniel Doody | March 14, 1965 | 31 | Connecticut | Fall | Huntington Ravine | Washington | |
| Craig Merrihue | March 14, 1965 | 32 | Massachusetts | Fall | Huntington Ravine | Washington | |
| Eric Davies | September 17, 1967 | 7 | New Hampshire | Accident | Cog Railway | Washington | |
| Mary Frank | September 17, 1967 | 38 | Michigan | Accident | Cog Railway | Washington | |
| Monica Gross | September 17, 1967 | 2 | Massachusetts | Accident | Cog Railway | Washington | |
| Shirley Zorzy | September 17, 1967 | 22 | Massachusetts | Accident | Cog Railway | Washington | |
| Beverly Richmond | September 17, 1967 | 15 | Connecticut | Accident | Cog Railway | Washington | |
| Kent Woodard | September 17, 1967 | 9 | New Hampshire | Accident | Cog Railway | Washington | |
| Charles Usher | September 17, 1967 | 55 | New Hampshire | Accident | Cog Railway | Washington | |
| Esther Usher | September 17, 1967 | 56 | New Hampshire | Accident | Cog Railway | Washington | |
| Scott Stevens | January 26, 1969 | 19 | California | Fall | Huntington Ravine | Washington | |
| Robert Ellenberg | January 26, 1969 | 19 | New York | Fall | Huntington Ravine | Washington | |
| Charles Yoder | January 26, 1969 | 24 | Wisconsin | Fall | Huntington Ravine | Washington | |
| Mark Larner | February 9, 1969 | 17 | New York | Fall | Unknown | Adams | |
| Albert R. Tenney | 1969 | 62 | Unknown | Heart Attack | Crawford Path | Jackson | |
| Richard Fitzgerald | October 12, 1969 | 26 | Massachusetts | Fall | Huntington Ravine | Washington | |
| Paul Ross | November 29, 1969 | 26 | Maine | Plane crash | Boott Spur | Washington | |
| Kenneth Ward | November 29, 1969 | 20 | Maine | Plane crash | Boott Spur | Washington | |
| Cliff Phillips | November 29, 1969 | 26 | Vermont | Plane crash | Boott Spur | Washington | |
| Irene Hennessey | March 21, 1971 | 47 | Unknown | Plane crash | Huntington Ravine | Washington | |
| Thomas Hennessey | March 21, 1971 | 54 | Unknown | Plane crash | Huntington Ravine | Washington | |
| Barbara Palmer | April 24, 1971 | 47 | Massachusetts | Hypothermia | Cog Railway | Washington | |
| Betsy Roberts | August 28, 1971 | 16 | Massachusetts | Drowning | Dry River | —N/a | |
| Geoffrey Bowdoin | October 10, 1971 | 18 | Massachusetts | Drowning | Dry River | —N/a | |
| Christopher Coyne | May 17, 1972 | 21 | Connecticut | Fall | Tuckerman Ravine | Washington | |
| Richard Thaler | September 23, 1972 | 49 | Massachusetts | Heart attack | King Ravine Trail | Adams | |
| Peter Winn | April 21, 1973 | 16 | New Hampshire | Fall while skiing | Tuckerman Ravine | Washington | |
| Vernon Titcomb | August 22, 1974 | 56 | California | Plane crash | Gray Knob | Adams | |
| John Titcomb | August 22, 1974 | 53 | California | Plane crash | Gray Knob | Adams | |
| Karl Brushaber | December 23, 1974 | 37 | Michigan | Fall | Tuckerman Ravine | Washington | |
| Clayton Rock | October 23, 1975 | 80 | Massachusetts | Heart attack | Lakes of the Clouds | Washington | |
| Marguerite Snyder Cassidy | March 26, 1976 | 24 | New Hampshire | Fall | Huntington Ravine | Washington | |
| Scott Whinnery | May 8, 1976 | 25 | New York | Fall in Hillman's Highway | Tuckerman Ravine | Washington | |
| Robert Evans | July 12, 1976 | 22 | Michigan | Fall | Tuckerman Ravine | Washington | |
| David Shoemaker | February 14, 1979 | 21 | Massachusetts | Fall | Huntington Ravine | Washington | |
| Paul Flanigan | February 14, 1979 | 26 | Massachusetts | Fall | Huntington Ravine | Washington | |
| Gary Saad | August 6, 1979 | 26 | Connecticut | Fall | Webster Cliff Trail | Webster | |
| Patrick Kelly | August 21, 1980 | 24 | Connecticut | Fall | Tuckerman Ravine | Washington | |
| Charles LaBonte | October 12, 1980 | 16 | Massachusetts | Fall | Ammonoosuc Ravine Trail | Washington | |
| James Dowd | October 13, 1980 | 43 | Massachusetts | Heart attack | Tuckerman Ravine Trail | Washington | |
| Peter Friedman | December 31, 1980 | 18 | Connecticut | Fall | Huntington Ravine | Washington | |
| Myles Coleman | August 8, 1981 | 73 | New York | Stroke | Summit | Washington | |
| Albert Dow | January 25, 1982 | 28 | New Hampshire | Avalanche | Lion Head Trail | Washington | |
| Kathy Hamann | March 28, 1982 | 25 | Connecticut | Fall while climbing ravine | Tuckerman Ravine | Washington | |
| John Fox | May 15, 1982 | 47 | Vermont | Stroke | Tuckerman Ravine | Washington | |
| Edward Aalbue | January 1, 1983 | 21 | New York | Fall | Huntington Ravine | Washington | |
| Kenneth Hokenson | March 24, 1983 | 23 | New York | Fall | Raymond Cataract | Washington | |
| Mark Brockman | March 27, 1983 | 19 | Massachusetts | Fall | Tuckerman Ravine Trail | Washington | |
| Paula Silva | July 30, 1984 | 22 | Massachusetts | Automobile crash | Mount Washington Auto Road | Washington | |
| Ernst Heimsoth | August 22, 1984 | 88 | Vermont | Heart attack | Summit | Washington | |
| Marjorie E. Frank | July 21, 1985 | 25 | Massachusetts | Suicide | Valley Way Trail | Madison | |
| Basil Goodridge | March 15, 1986 | 56 | Vermont | Heart attack | Castle Trail | Jefferson | |
| Robert Jones | April 5, 1986 | 53 | Maine | Heart attack | Tuckerman Ravine Trail | Washington | |
| McDonald Barr | August 24, 1986 | 52 | Massachusetts | Hypothermia | Unknown | Madison | |
| Edwin B. Costa | June 3, 1990 | 39 | New Hampshire | Fall | Great Gulf | Washington | |
| Jimmy Jones | October 2, 1990 | 34 | Texas | Plane crash | Great Gulf | Washington | |
| Russell Diedrick | October 2, 1990 | 24 | Texas | Plane crash | Great Gulf | Washington | |
| Stewart Eames | October 2, 1990 | 27 | Texas | Plane crash | Great Gulf | Washington | |
| Thomas Smith | February 24, 1991 | 41 | Vermont | Avalanche | Huntington Ravine | Washington | |
| Louis Nichols | January 27, 1992 | 46 | New Hampshire | Hypothermia | Cog Railway | Washington | |
| George Rimini | August 12, 1992 | 65 | North Carolina | Heart attack | Alpine Garden | Washington | |
| Derek Tinkham | January 15, 1994 | 20 | Rhode Island | Hypothermia | Summit | Jefferson | |
| Monroe Couper | February 26, 1994 | 40 | New Jersey | Hypothermia | Alpine Garden | Washington | |
| Erick Lattey | February 26, 1994 | 28 | New Jersey | Hypothermia | Alpine Garden | Washington | |
| Cheryl Weingarten | May 1, 1994 | 22 | New York | Fall into a crevasse while sliding | Tuckerman Ravine | Washington | |
| Sarah Nicholson | June 4, 1994 | 25 | Maine | Falling ice | Tuckerman Ravine | Washington | |
| Ronald Hastings | October 8, 1994 | 63 | New Hampshire | Natural causes | Summit | Washington | |
| Christopher Schneider | March 28, 1995 | 31 | Vermont | Fall while skiing in Hillman's Highway | Tuckerman Ravine | Washington | |
| Alexandre Cassan | January 5, 1996 | 19 | Canada (Quebec) | Avalanche | Tuckerman Ravine | Washington | |
| Donald Cote | February 2, 1996 | 48 | Massachusetts | Fall | Tuckerman Ravine | Washington | |
| Nicholas Halpern | February 25, 1996 | 50 | Massachusetts | Hypothermia | Mt. Pleasant Brook | Eisenhower | |
| Robert Vandel | March 2, 1996 | 50 | Maine | Fall | Huntington Ravine | Washington | |
| Todd Crumbaker | March 24, 1996 | 35 | Massachusetts | Avalanche | Gulf of Slides | Washington | |
| John Wald | March 24, 1996 | 35 | Massachusetts | Avalanche | Gulf of Slides | Washington | |
| Stephen Carmody | September 27, 1997 | 29 | Connecticut | Fall | Tuckerman Ravine | Washington | |
| John Gringas | May 29, 1999 | 44 | Connecticut | Heart Attack | Summit | Washington | |
| Douglas Folger Thompson | October 30, 1999 | 66 | New Hampshire | Heart Attack | Summit | Madison | |
| David McPhedran | February 20, 2000 | 42 | Maine | Avalanche | Gulf of Slides | Washington | |
| Ned Green | February 18, 2001 | 26 | New Hampshire | Fall | Huntington Ravine | Washington | |
| Hillary Manion | June 3, 2001 | 22 | Canada (Ontario) | Fall while skiing in The Chute | Tuckerman Ravine | Washington | |
| Louise Chaput | November 15, 2001 | 52 | Canada (Quebec) | Homicide | Glen Boulder Trail | Washington | |
| William Luquette | July 22, 2002 | 46 | New Hampshire | Heart attack | Crawford Path | Pierce | |
| Peter Busher | September 11, 2002 | 71 | Virginia | Hypothermia | Gulfside Trail | Madison | |
| William Callahan | September 29, 2002 | 57 | Georgia | Heart Attack | Unknown | Unknown | |
| Scott Sandberg | November 29, 2002 | 32 | Massachusetts | Avalanche | Tuckerman Ravine | Washington | |
| Thomas Burke | November 29, 2002 | 46 | New Hampshire | Avalanche | Tuckerman Ravine | Washington | |
| Jason Gaumond | January 27, 2004 | 28 | Massachusetts | Fall | Huntington Ravine | Washington | |
| Rob Douglas | March 7, 2004 | 39 | Vermont | Fall | Great Gulf | Clay | |
| Jean Moreau | August 4, 2006 | 50 | Canada (Quebec) | Natural causes | Davis Path | Washington | |
| Kevin Race | September 9, 2007 | 46 | Maine | Missing | Hermit Lake | Washington | |
| Peter Roux | January 18, 2008 | 39 | Tennessee | Avalanche | Huntington Ravine | Washington | |
| Peter Shintani | June 9, 2009 | 70 | Canada (Ontario) | Hypothermia | Lion Head Trail | Washington | |
| Paul West | August 8, 2009 | 65 | Massachusetts | Automobile crash | Mount Washington Auto Road | Washington | |
| Wieslaw Walczak | November 21, 2009 | 62 | New Hampshire | Fall off the Headwall | Tuckerman Ravine | Washington | |
| Christopher Baillie | July 18, 2010 | 24 | New Jersey | Fall off the Headwall | Tuckerman Ravine | Washington | |
| Patrick Scott Powers | January 9, 2012 | 46 | Massachusetts | Fall off the Headwall | Tuckerman Ravine | Washington | |
| Norman Priebatsch | April 1, 2012 | 67 | Massachusetts | Fall into a crevasse | Tuckerman Ravine | Washington | |
| Gary Muise | August 13, 2012 | 57 | Massachusetts | Natural causes | Huntington Ravine | Washington | |
| Richard Gabrielle | January 26, 2013 | 64 | Texas | Fall | Great Gully, King's Ravine | Adams | |
| James Watts | March 1, 2013 | 24 | New York | Fall | Pinnacle Gully, Huntington Ravine | Washington | |
| Luc Paquette | September 19, 2013 | 25 | Canada (Quebec) | Fall | Tuckerman Ravine Trail | Washington | |
| Robert Fernandez | October 12, 2013 | 69 | Maine | Heart attack | Ammonoosuc Ravine Trail | Washington | |
| Gregory Larson | August 29, 2014 | 63 | Maine | Heart attack | Caps Ridge Trail | Jefferson | |
| Kate Matrosova | February 15, 2015 | 32 | New York | Hypothermia | Star Lake Trail | Adams | |
| Vernon R. Rippeon | June 21, 2015 | 51 | Maryland | Heart attack | Crawford Path | Pierce | |
| Tim Hallock | February 28, 2016 | 54 | New York | Hypothermia | Castle Ravine Trail | Jefferson | |
| Francois Carrier | May 9, 2016 | 47 | Canada (Quebec) | Hypothermia | Tuckerman Ravine | Washington | |
| Rick Libby | October 15, 2016 | 62 | New Hampshire | Heart attack | Caps Ridge Trail | Jefferson | |
| Gregory Auriemma | July 20, 2017 (Note: The date his body was discovered.) | 63 | New Jersey | Unknown | Isolation Trail | Pierce | |
| Rolf Diamon | September 16, 2017 | 66 | Maine | Unknown medical event | Lion Head Trail | Washington | |
| Jeremy Ullmann | February 10, 2019 | 37 | Massachusetts | Fall | Central Gully, Huntington Ravine | Washington | |
| Porith Stephon Sou | March 8, 2019 | 21 | Massachusetts | Missing | Lion Head Winter Route | Washington | |
| Nicholas Benedix | April 10, 2019 | 32 | New Hampshire | Avalanche | Raymond Cataract | Washington | |
| Sandra Lee | June 13, 2019 | 63 | New Jersey | Hypothermia | Tuckerman Ravine Trail | Washington | |
| Joseph M. Gormley | September 12, 2020 | 60 | Massachusetts | Unknown | Summit | Jefferson | |
| Ian Forgays | February 1, 2021 | 54 | Vermont | Avalanche | Ammonoosuc Ravine | Washington | |
| Timothy McClelland | August 14, 2021 | 66 | Connecticut | Unknown medical event | Jewell Trail | Washington | |
| Xi Chen | June 18, 2022 | 53 | Massachusetts | Hypothermia | Gulfside Trail | Clay | |
| John R. Quick Jr. | July 30, 2022 | 65 | Missouri | Hypothermia | Jewell Trail | Washington | |
| Yanick Belanger | August 25, 2022 | 46 | Canada (Quebec) | Heart attack | Summit | Washington | |
| Jason Apreku | August 11, 2023 | 21 | Pennsylvania | Unknown | Osgood Trail | Madison | |
| Madison Saltsburg | March 9, 2024 | 20 | Pennsylvania | Fall | Tuckerman Ravine | Washington | |
| William Donovan | April 2024 | 65 | Massachusetts | Drowning | Dry River Wilderness | Monroe | |
| Anthony Antenucci | August 22, 2024 | 72 | Virginia | Exposure | Gulfside Trail | Washington | |
| Richard Perrault | June 16, 2025 | 70 | Connecticut | Unknown medical event | Valley Way Trail | Madison | |
| William Davis | July 16, 2025 | 79 | Florida | Fall (presumed) | Summit | Washington | |
