= Presidential Traverse =

Mountain traverse in New Hampshire

The Presidential Traverse is a strenuous and sometimes dangerous trek over the Presidential Range of New Hampshire's White Mountains. Contained almost entirely in the 750,000-acre (3,000 km^{2}) White Mountain National Forest, the Presidential Range is a string of summits in excess of 4,000 feet (1,200 m). To complete the traverse, one must begin at either the northern or southern terminus of the Presidential Range and finish at the opposing end. Beginning the journey at the northern end at Mount Madison, one would pass through the townships of (in order, going in a generally south-southwesterly direction) Low and Burbank's Grant, Thompson and Meserve's Purchase, Sargent's Purchase, Chandler's Purchase, and Bean's Grant (at Mount Pierce), all of which are in Coös County.

== Options ==
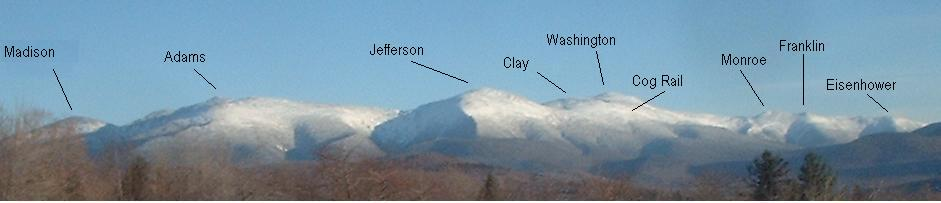
The Presidential Range from north (left) to south (right). Mt. Pierce is absent

=== The minimum ===
The basic Presidential Traverse begins from a trailhead on U.S. Route 2 or at the Dolly Copp Campground at the northern end of the Presidentials, crosses the great ridge of the range and ends in Crawford Notch at its southern terminus, or vice versa. A hiker making such a journey would travel about 23 miles (37 km), with 9,000 feet (2,700 m) of elevation gain.

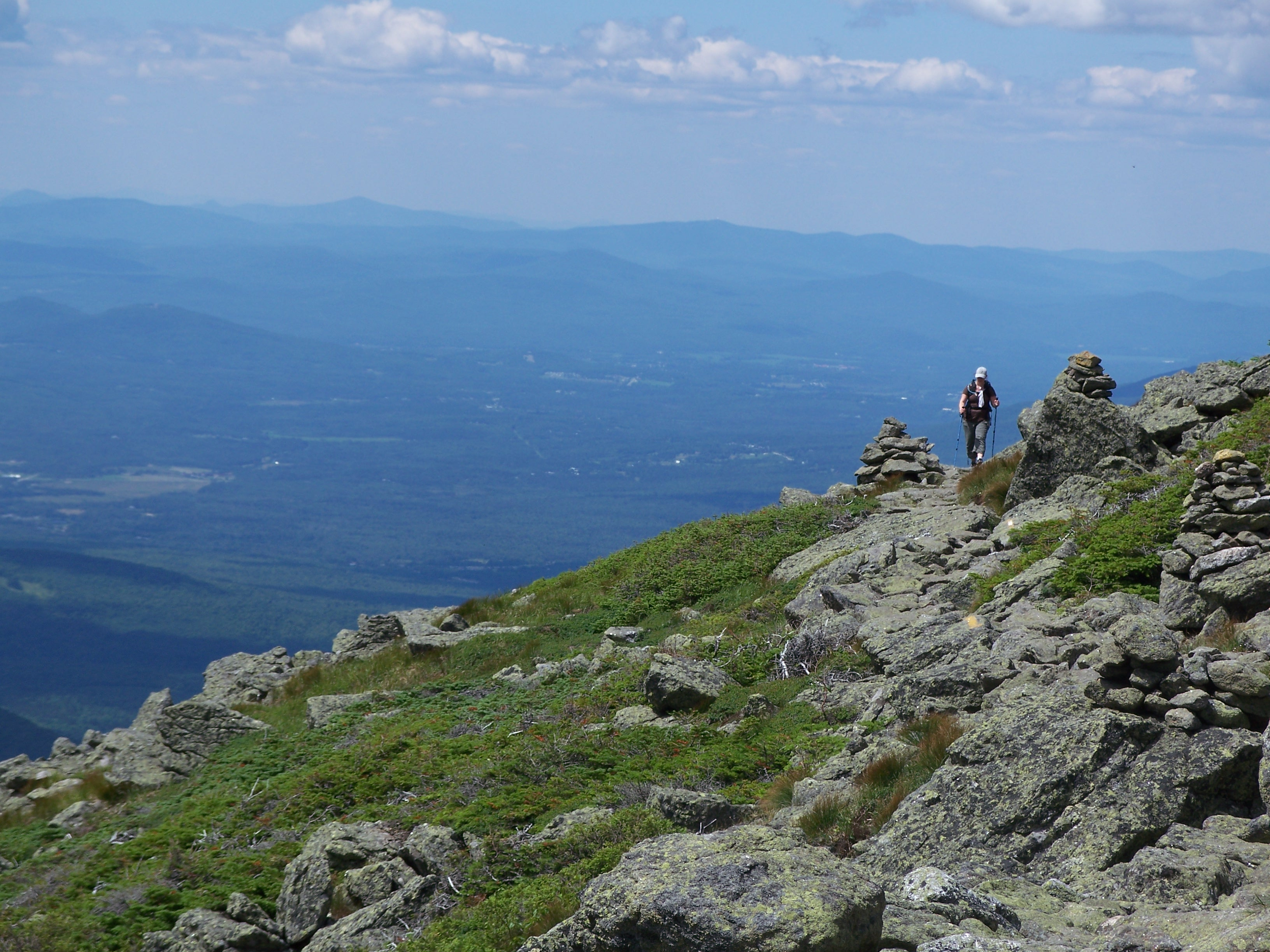
A hiker traverses the Gulfside Trail.

By definition, a "presidential" traverse requires a participant to cross over the summits of peaks named after U.S. presidents. Listed from north to south, they are:

- Mount Madison - named after James Madison
- Mount Adams - named after John Adams
- Mount Jefferson - named after Thomas Jefferson
- Mount Washington - named after George Washington
- Mount Monroe - named after James Monroe
- Mount Eisenhower - named after Dwight Eisenhower
- Mount Pierce - named after Franklin Pierce

The total distance could be shortened to 20.4 miles (32.8 km) by only taking standard through trails. However, you would not summit all peaks.

=== Additional named peaks ===
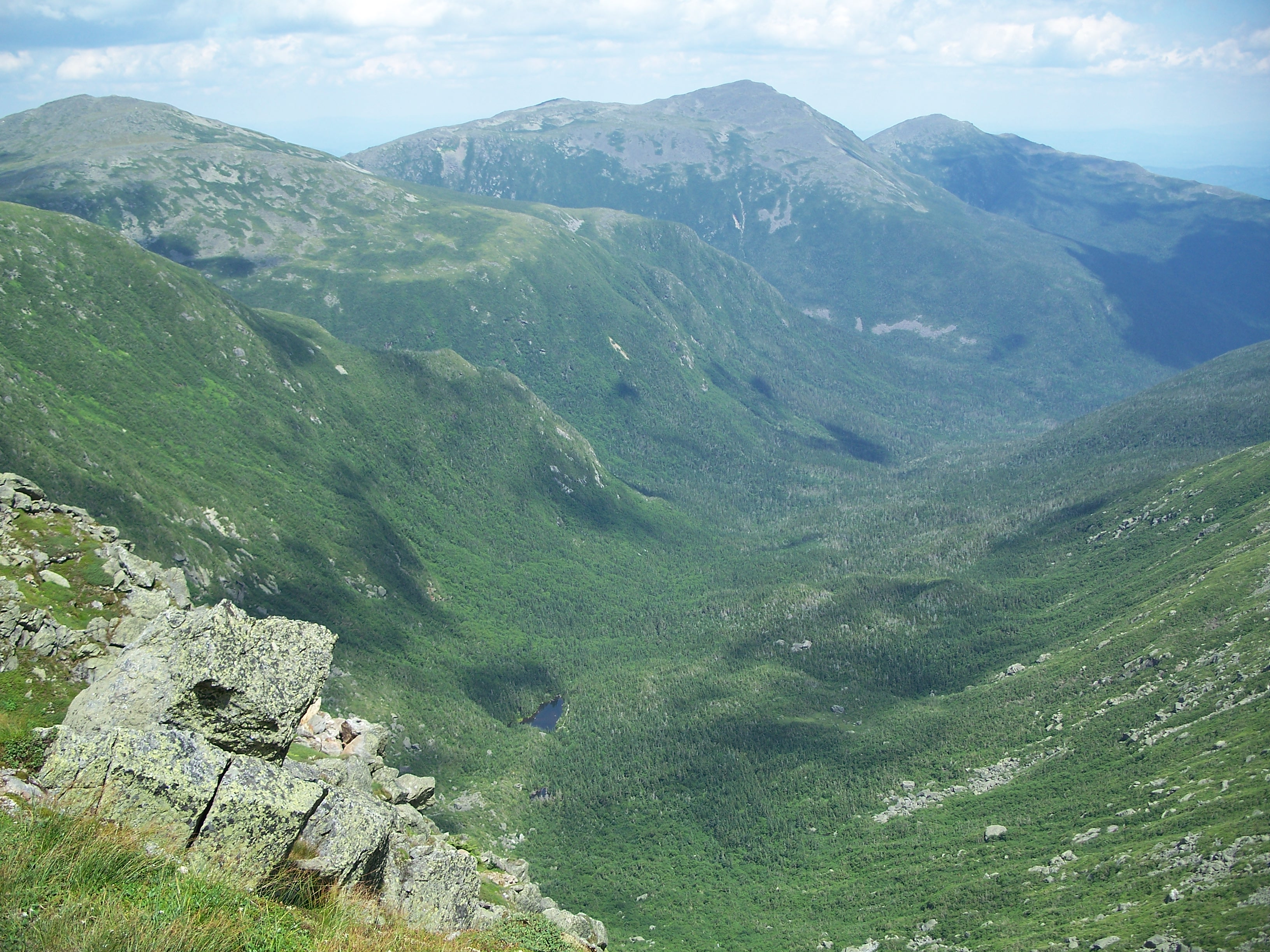
The Great Gulf and the northern Presidentials as seen from the Gulfside Trail

A traverse which collects all of the trail-accessible peaks in the Presidential Range includes (from north to south):

- Mount Clay - named after Henry Clay (a senator from Kentucky and contemporary of Daniel Webster). Strictly regarded, Clay lacks the 200 feet (61 m) of prominence above the shoulder of Mt. Washington to be considered eligible and is thus considered a minor summit of that peak. (In 2003, the New Hampshire legislature passed a law renaming the peak as "Mount Reagan", after President Ronald Reagan, but the U.S. Board on Geographic Names (BGN) voted in May 2010 not to change the name of the mountain.)
- Mount Franklin - named for famed inventor and political figure Benjamin Franklin, a sub-peak of Mt. Monroe.
- Mount Jackson - named not for President Andrew Jackson as many believe, but for Charles Thomas Jackson, who served as State Geologist for New Hampshire, Maine, and Rhode Island in the late 19th century.
- Mount Webster - named for Daniel Webster, famed American statesman and New Hampshire native.

Adding these peaks increases total mileage traveled and elevation gain to 22.8 miles (36.7 km) and 10,041 feet (3,060 m).

=== Sub-peaks ===
Several minor peaks ineligible for the list due to lack of prominence have no maintained trails leading to their summits. Hiking off-trail is prohibited; however, some hikers have bushwhacked them as part of a traverse. These include:

- Mount Sam Adams - sub-peak of Mt. Adams, named for Samuel Adams (American statesman and second cousin of John Adams)
- Mount JQ Adams - sub-peak of Mt. Adams, named for President John Quincy Adams
- Mount Abigail Adams - sub-peak of Mt. Adams, named for John Adams' wife Abigail Adams (before being renamed in November 2010, this was Adams IV)
- Adams V - an unnamed sub-peak of Mt. Adams

=== Lodging options ===
There are several campsites and huts along the route of the Presidential Traverse. It is recommended that hikers use these sites, as camping above treeline is prohibited.

- Valley Way Tent Site - Free. First come, first served. This site offers platform-style options for tents.
- Madison Springs Hut - Expensive. Co-ed bunk accommodations are offered.
- Lakes of the Clouds Hut - Expensive. Co-ed bunk accommodations are offered.
- Mizpah Spring Hut - Expensive. Co-ed bunk accommodations are offered.
- Naumann Tent Site - Inexpensive. First come, first served. This site offers platform-style options for tents.

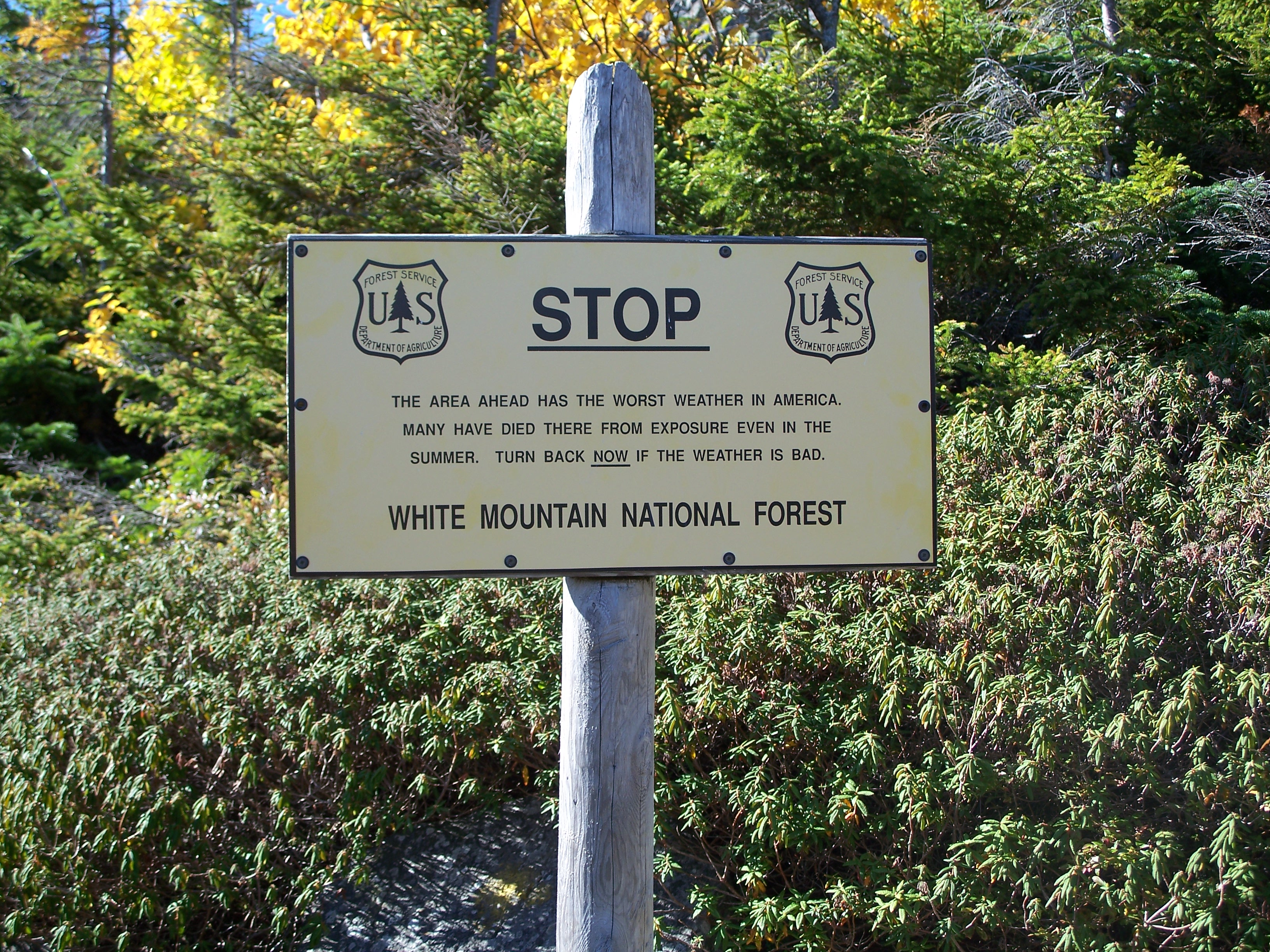
A sign warns of harsh terrain ahead.

== Hazards ==
The White Mountains and the Presidential Range in particular have some of the most challenging terrain in the Eastern United States. Many hikers attempting a Presidential Traverse have become lost or otherwise disabled in inclement weather above treeline, causing many costly search and rescue operations.

=== Weather ===
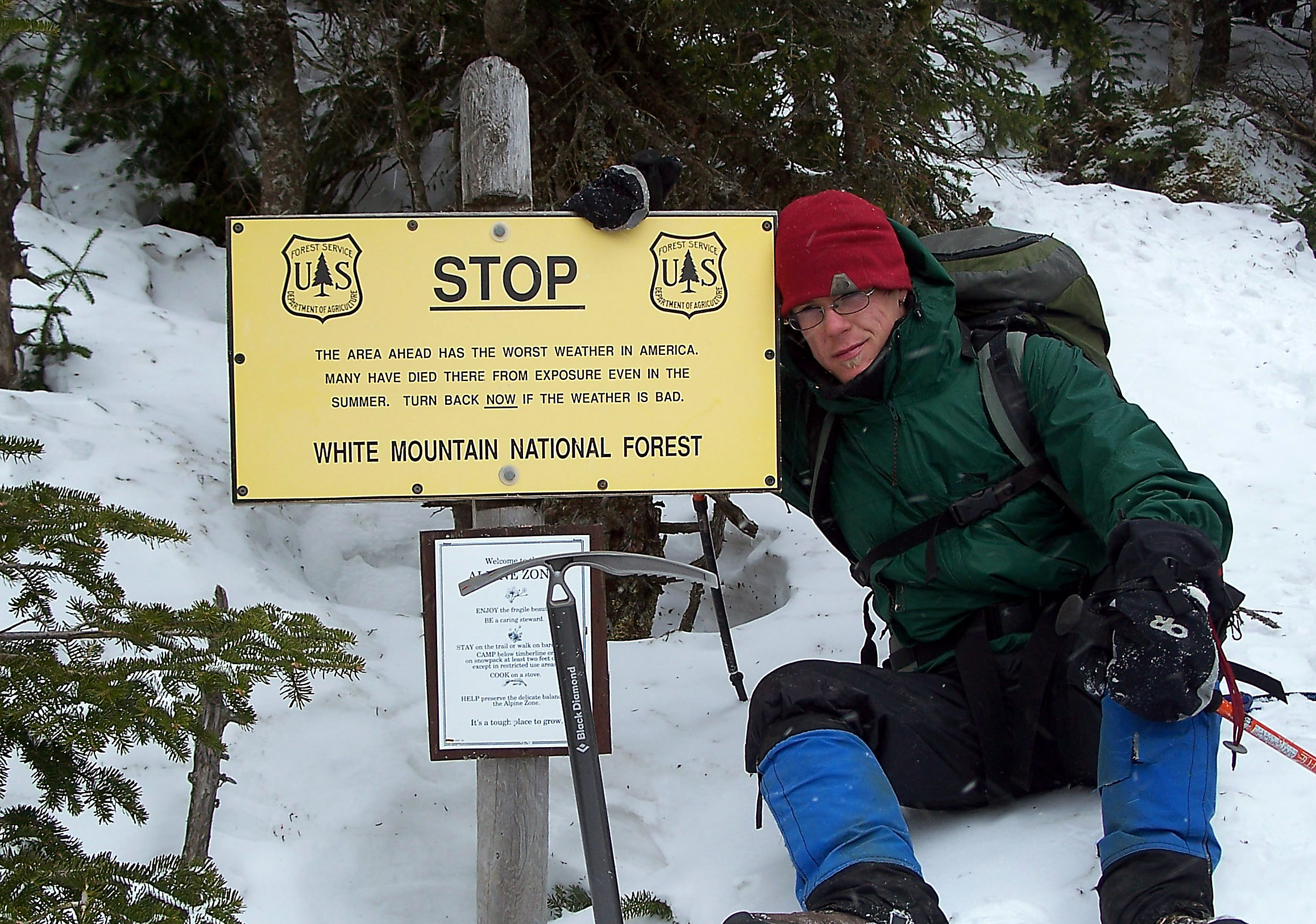
A sign warns of dangerous weather.

The Presidential Range is known for its tumultuous weather, highlighted by the erratic and often extreme conditions upon Mount Washington and its other summits. Being both at the intersection of several storm tracks and the center of multiple converging valleys funneling wind from the west, southwest, and south make its weather unpredictable and at times violent. The summits of the range have been known to see snow and ice in all seasons, and are subject to a combination of hurricane-force winds and blanketing clouds an average of 110 days a year. Mount Washington long held the record for the highest wind speed ever recorded at the Earth's surface, clocking 231 miles per hour (372 km/h), forcing summit buildings to be chained down so they won't blow away.

==== Winter ====
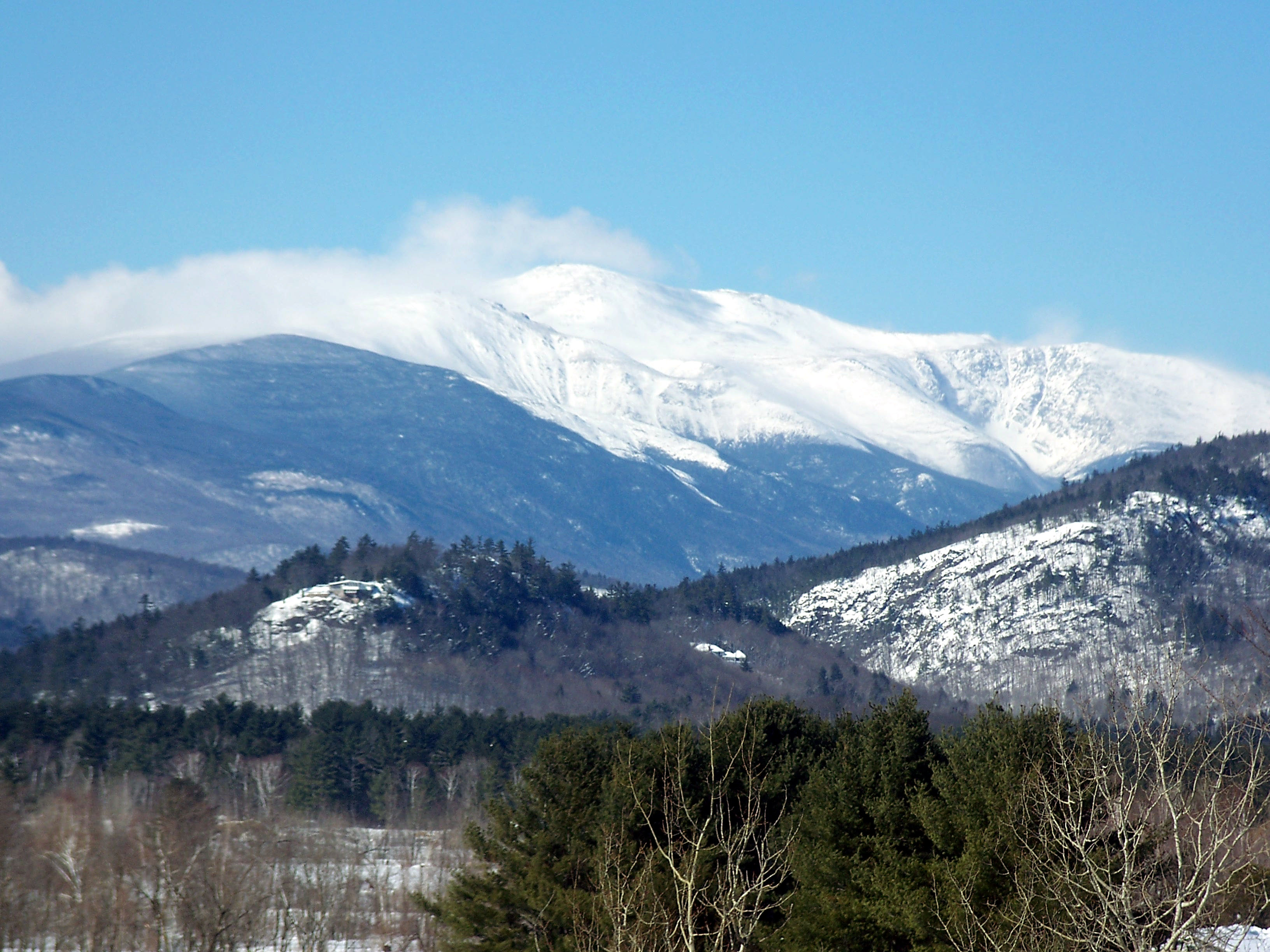
High winds blow snow off the peak of Mount Washington.

Views from the Presidentials ridgeline in the crisp winter air are unrivaled in the Northeast. However, winter terrain is more treacherous, temperatures may plummet with dangerous speed, and wind speeds often hit triple digits. Snowfall at elevation is measured in feet instead of inches, avalanches are common on the large snowfields and in ravines, and blowing snow, ice fog, and heavy clouds can cause visibility to disappear in minutes. Consequently, those wishing to tackle a Presidential Traverse in winter must be exceptionally fit, experienced in winter mountaineering and compass orientation techniques, very familiar with the terrain, and have high-quality winter gear. Lacking any one of these puts one in serious peril of requiring expensive and hazardous rescue, even death.

=== Vertical ===
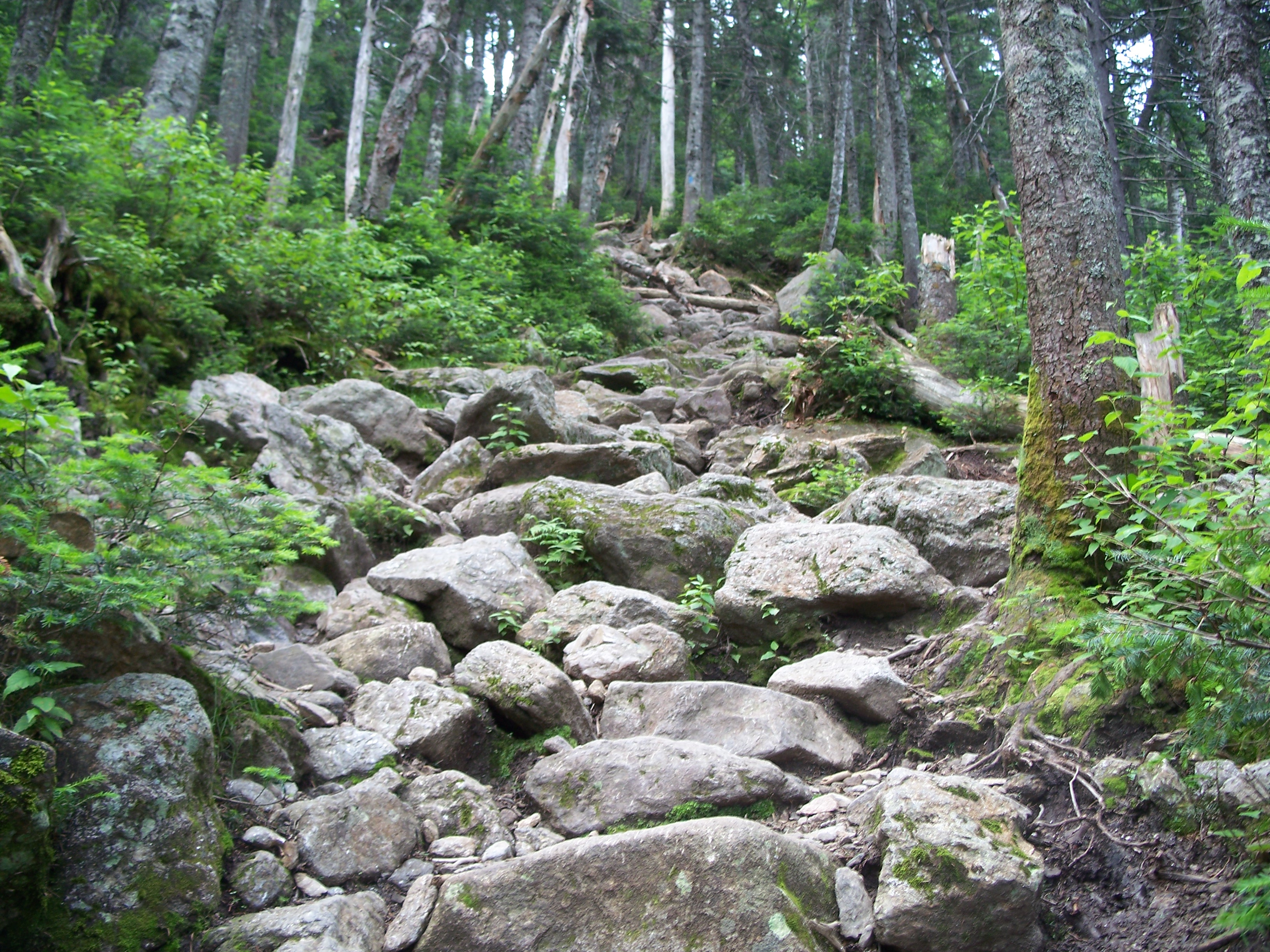
Rugged terrain on the Watson Path

The difference in elevation between the highest point (Mt. Washington summit) and lowest point (Appalachia or Dolly Copp Campground, say) along a Presidential Traverse is about 5,000 feet (1,500 m), but the traverse involves repeated gain and loss of elevation between summits along the way, so the total elevation gain is closer to 9,000 feet (2,700 m). Including the principal sub-peaks stretches this to about 10,000 feet (3,000 m). Moreover, the traverse involves about the same amount of elevation loss as gain.

== Sources ==
1. Daniell, G and Smith, S. AMC White Mountain Guide, 27th Edition. AMC Books, 2003.
2. Howe, N. Not Without Peril. AMC Books, 2000.
3. Cox, S and Fulsaas, K. Mountaineering: The Freedom of the Hills, 7th Edition. The Mountaineers Books, 2003.
4. Lanza, M. New England Hiking. Foghorn Press, 1997.

== See also ==
- Presidential Range
- Mount Washington (New Hampshire)
- Hiking
- Mountaineering
- Peak bagging
- Mount Washington Auto Road
- Mount Washington Cog Railway
