= Mount Monroe =

Mountain in the American state of New Hampshire

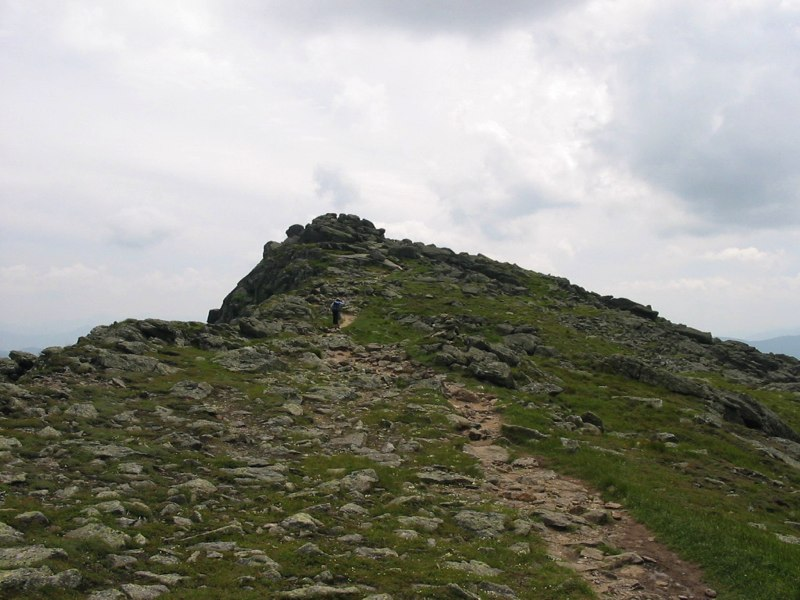
- Summit of Mount Monroe (Summer 2006)

Highest point
- Elevation: 5,372 ft (1,637 m)
- Prominence: 254 ft (77 m)
- Parent peak: Mount Washington
- Listing: White Mountain 4000-Footers
- Coordinates: 44°15′20″N 71°19′21″W

Geography
- Location within New Hampshire Location within the United States
- Country: United States
- State: New Hampshire
- District: Coös County
- Subdivision: Sargent's Purchase
- Parent range: Presidential Range
- Topo map: USGS Mount Washington

Climbing
- Easiest route: Hike

Mount Monroe is a 5,372-foot-high (1,637 m) mountain peak southwest of Mount Washington in the Presidential Range of the White Mountains in New Hampshire, United States. It is named for American President James Monroe and is the fourth highest mountain on the 4000 footers list for New Hampshire. The Appalachian Trail skirts its summit, which is the next highest peak on or near the trail north of Mount Rogers in Virginia. The Lakes of the Clouds, and its AMC hut, lie nestled at the col between Mount Monroe and neighboring Mount Washington.

Lying between Mount Washington and Mount Eisenhower, Mount Monroe is inaccessible by road but may be reached by several hiking trails. The most direct route to its summit from the valley below is chiefly via the Ammonoosuc Ravine Trail which starts to the northwest near the base station of the Mount Washington Cog Railway. After ascending to the Lakes of the Clouds Hut, the eastern terminus of the trail, climbers proceed to Monroe's summit via the Crawford Path and then the Monroe Loop trail. Other routes to the summit ascend via the Crawford Path from Crawford Notch, singly or in combination with the Edmands Path from Mount Clinton Road to the west of the mountain, with the final ascent to the summit accomplished by the Monroe Loop. From the east, climbers can trek to Monroe via a combination of the Boott Spur, Tuckerman Ravine, or Lion Head trails, among others, traversing via intervening trails, or descend from the summit of Mount Washington, which may be reached on foot, by car or by the Cog Railway, along the Crawford Path or by other routes. Very frequently hikers will visit Monroe in combination with Washington or Eisenhower and sometimes with other nearby peaks.

Mount Monroe offers views across the Lakes of the Clouds to its grand neighbor to the northeast, Mount Washington, over 900 feet (270 m) higher, to Mount Jefferson and Mount Clay north of Washington and to Boott Spur and Mount Isolation south of the dominant peak, as well as views to the west along the southern spine of the Presidential Range, through the Dry River valley, and out to more of the White Mountains to the south and west and to Vermont beyond.

As with Mount Washington, the upper reaches of Mount Monroe lie above tree-line in a sub-arctic tundra climate zone, characterized by highly variable and often very severe weather, especially from late fall through early spring. One distinguishing feature of the mountain is the largely flat Monroe Lawn south of the summit, traversed by the Crawford Path and home to several rare species of plant, including the endangered Robbins Cinquefoil, which survive in this harsh, outlying climate and terrain where other plants perish. Visitors traversing the Lawn are strictly limited to the trail in order to protect the many fragile flora which grow there.

Other notable features of the mountain include its subpeaks, "Little Monroe" to the west of the principal peak and approximately 175 feet (53 m) shorter, and Mount Franklin, southwest of the summit and nearly 5,000 feet (1,500 m) above sea level. The mountain, as with much of the Presidential Range, is characterized by steep walls on either side of the main ridge, to its northwest and southeast, making for strenuous climbs from the valley below and for numerous waterfalls - especially along the route followed by the Ammonoosuc Ravine Trail - and frequently scarred by landslides.
