= Tuckerman Brewing Company =

Brewery in Conway, New Hampshire, US

- Founded: 1998
- Headquarters: Conway, New Hampshire; United States
- Area served: New Hampshire, Massachusetts, Maine
- Production output: ~8,000 U.S. barrels
- Owner: Kirsten Neves and Nik Stanciu
- Number of employees: 13
- Website: tuckermanbrewing.com

Tuckerman Brewing Company is a brewery in Conway, New Hampshire, USA. Named after the nearby Tuckerman Ravine, the brewery currently produces three year round beers, the self-named pale ale, an Altbier, and the 6288 Stout. A portion of the proceeds from the sale of the stout go to support the Mount Washington Observatory, which sits 6,288 feet (1,917 m) above sea level on Mount Washington.
