= Lakes of the Clouds =

Small bodies of water in the U.S. state of New Hampshire

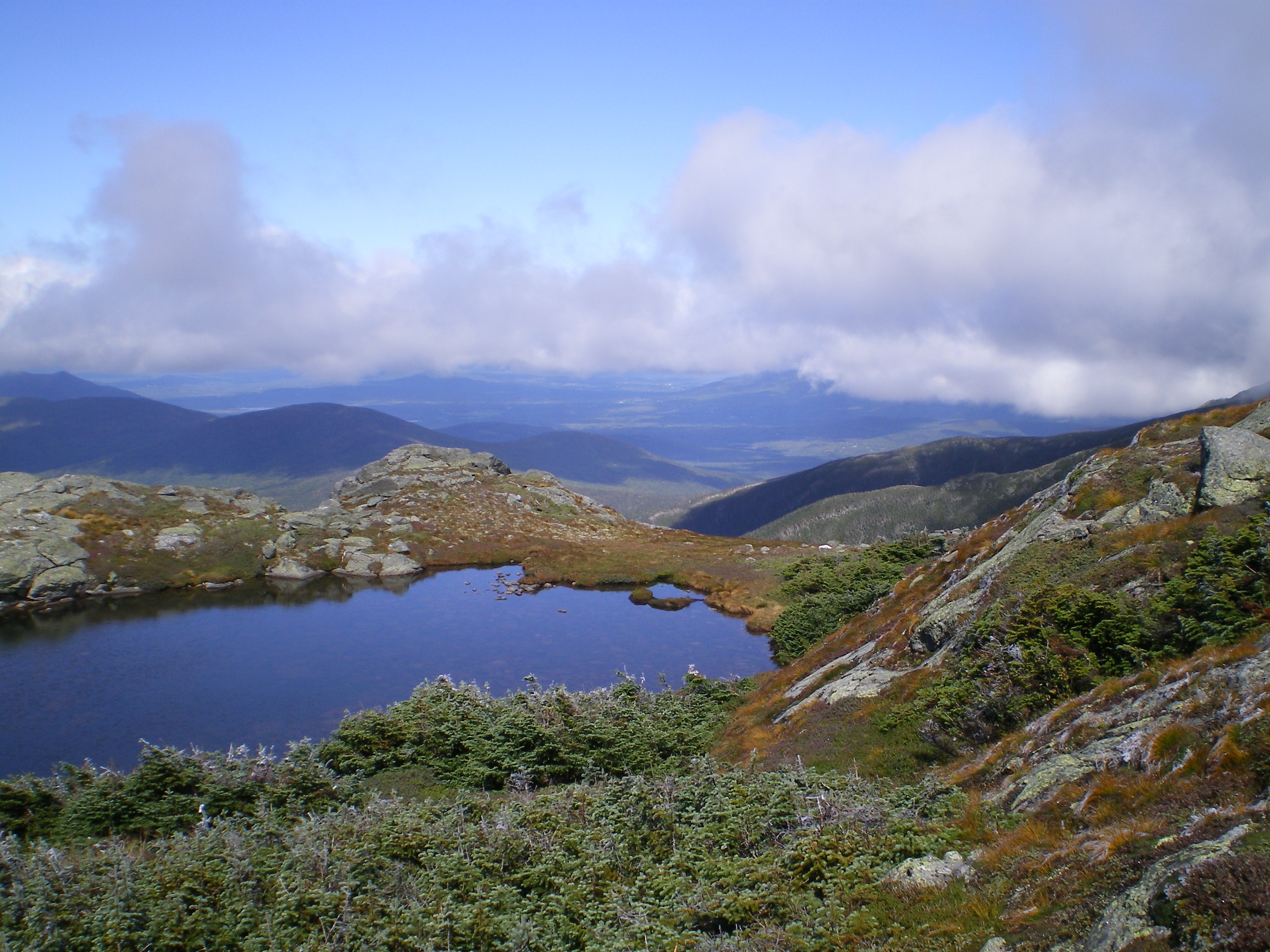
- One of the Lakes of the Clouds

- Location within New Hampshire Location within the United States
- Location: Coos County, New Hampshire; White Mountain National Forest
- Coordinates: 44°15′31″N 71°19′8″W
- Primary outflows: Ammonoosuc River
- Basin countries: United States
- Surface area: 0.6 acres (2,428 m^{2})
- Surface elevation: 5,032 ft (1,534 m)

The Lakes of the Clouds are a set of tarns located at the 5,032 ft (1,534 m) col between Mount Monroe and Mount Washington in the White Mountains of the U.S. state of New Hampshire. The lakes form the source of the Ammonoosuc River, a tributary of the Connecticut River. They are recorded by the Geographic Names Information System as the highest elevation lakes in the United States east of South Dakota.

The Lakes of the Clouds Hut, a rental hut and lodge for hikers operated by the Appalachian Mountain Club, is adjacent to the lakes, facing west. Lakes of the Clouds may be reached by hiking from Marshfield Station, on the Mount Washington Cog Railway, via the Ammonoosuc Ravine Trail (in approximately four hours). The area is also traversed by the Crawford Path (part of the Appalachian Trail) and the Dry River Trail.

== See also ==
- List of lakes of New Hampshire
- Presidential Range
