= Tuckerman Ravine =

Mountain in New Hampshire

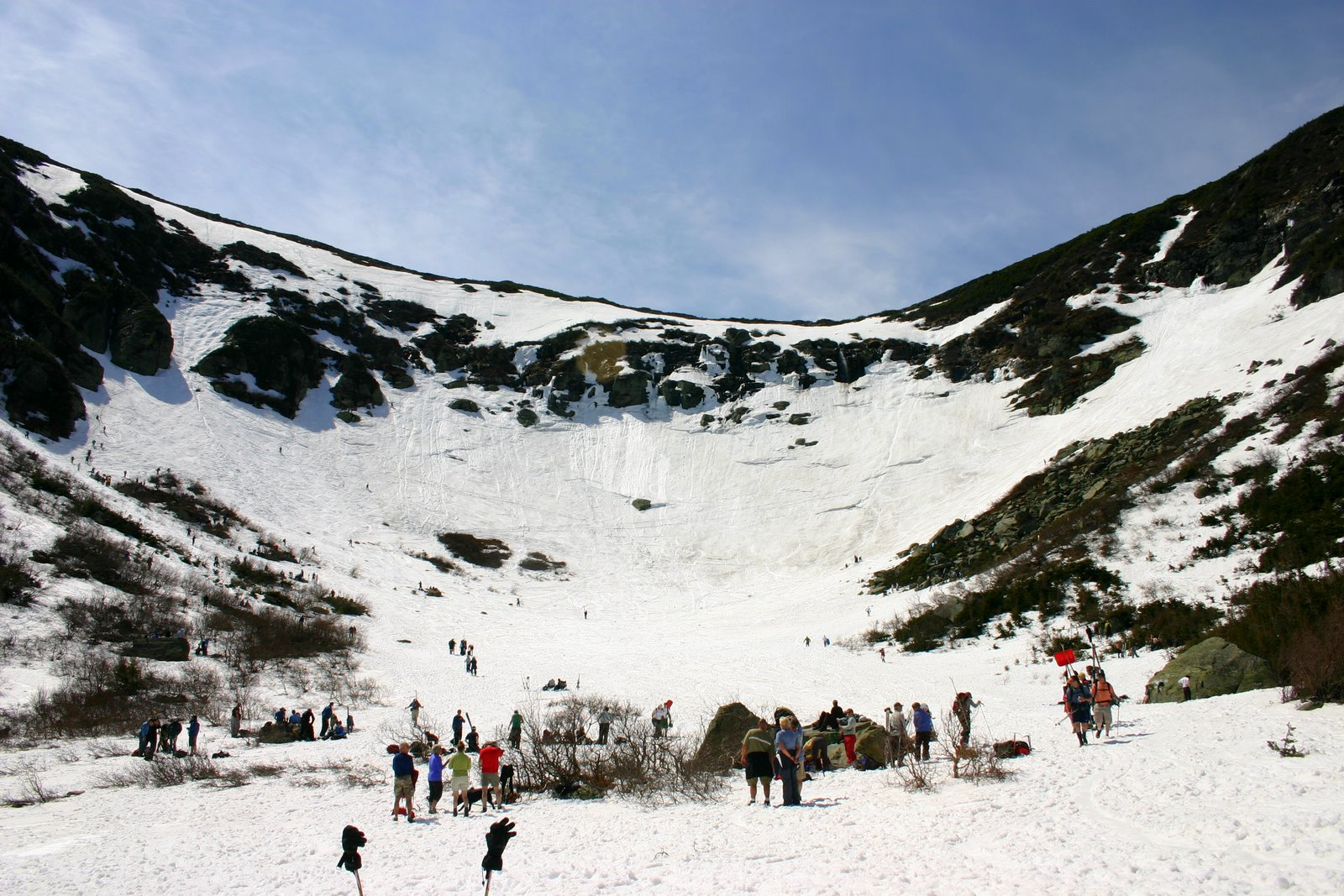
- Tuckerman Ravine with late spring skiers after the headwall has thawed
- Floor elevation: 4,430 ft (1,350 m)

Geography
- Location: New Hampshire, United States
- Coordinates: 44°15′45″N 71°17′54″W
- Mountain range: White Mountains
- Interactive map of Tuckerman Ravine

Tuckerman Ravine is a glacial cirque sloping eastward on the southeast face of Mt. Washington, in the White Mountains of New Hampshire. Although it draws hikers throughout the year, and skiers throughout the winter, it is best known for the many "spring skiers" who ascend it on foot and ski down the steep slope from early April into July. In this period, the temperatures are relatively mild but the natural snowpack — which averages up to 55 feet (17 m) in a typical winter — is still adequate to ski most seasons. The record-setting high winds atop Mount Washington scour a massive amount of snow from the surrounding highlands and drop it here or in the adjacent Huntington Ravine.

Thousands of people have been known to ski Tuckerman in a single spring weekend. Skiing is not limited to this time, but the avalanche danger, peaking from late December to early March, requires special training and experience to assess and navigate the ravine safely during the winter. Avalanches have killed at least 10 people in the ravine since the 1960s.

The ravine, whose name is often shortened to "Tucks" or "Tux" in comments and on commemorative materials is most easily accessed from the AMC Visitor Center on Route 16 at Pinkham Notch, via the moderate 2.4-mile (3.9 km) lower section of the Tuckerman Ravine Trail. This trail is maintained in winter and spring as a "cat" trail, and parallels the Sherburne Trail used for ski and snowboard descents. It is a 1,850-foot (560 m) elevation drop from the foot of Tuckerman to the lodge.

== Anatomy of the Bowl ==
Tuckerman Ravine has many different runs that span the bowl, all as steep as 40 to 55 degrees. From the base of the bowl, the run farthest to the left is known simply as "Left Gully" and is one of the easiest runs. Moving to the right, the runs are more challenging and steeper. More to the right, "The Chute" drops between two large cliffs that slowly narrow the run. Still farther to the right are the Center Gullies, which includes "The Icefall", which is 55 degrees, and requires skiers to go off cliffs as tall as 25 feet (7.6 m). Right of "The Icefall" is "The Lip". It is an open run that averages between 50 and 55 degrees. "Right Gully", one of the bowl's easier runs, drops into "The Sluice" about halfway down, and averages about 40 degrees.

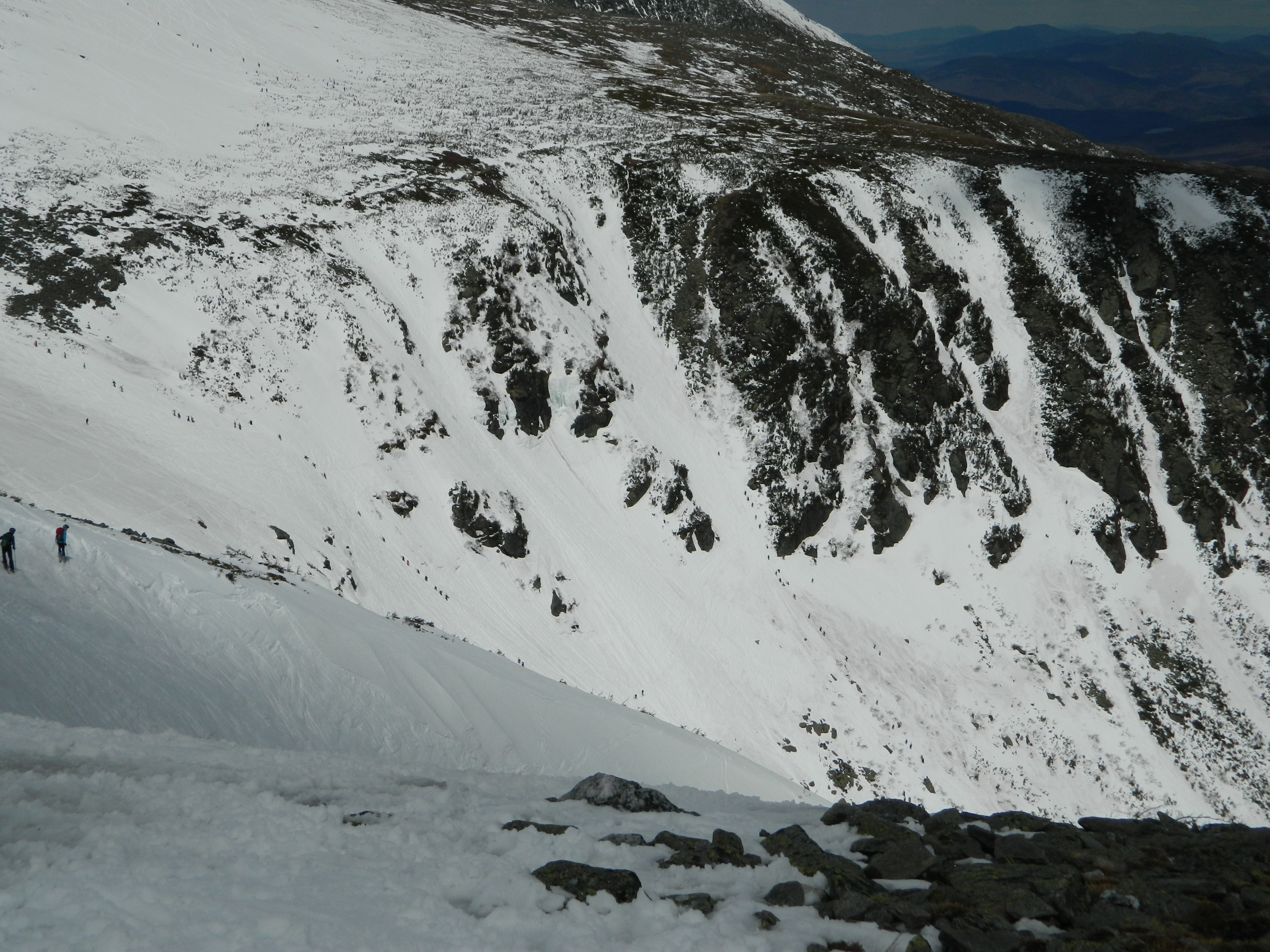
View of Tuckerman Ravine from above Left Gully

== History ==
The ravine is named after botanist Edward Tuckerman who studied alpine plants and lichens in the area in the 1830s and 1840s. According to the New England Ski Museum, the first recorded use of skis on Mount Washington was by a Dr. Wiskott of Breslau, Germany, who skied on the mountain in 1899, while the first skier in Tuckerman Ravine was John S. Apperson of Schenectady, New York, in April 1914. According to the Mount Washington Avalanche Center, the first known death associated with the bowl is a 15-year-old "killed by falling ice" on July 24, 1886; the first recorded death associated with icefall was in January 1936; the first death associated with falling into a crevasse was in June 1940; and the first skiing-related death was in April 1943.

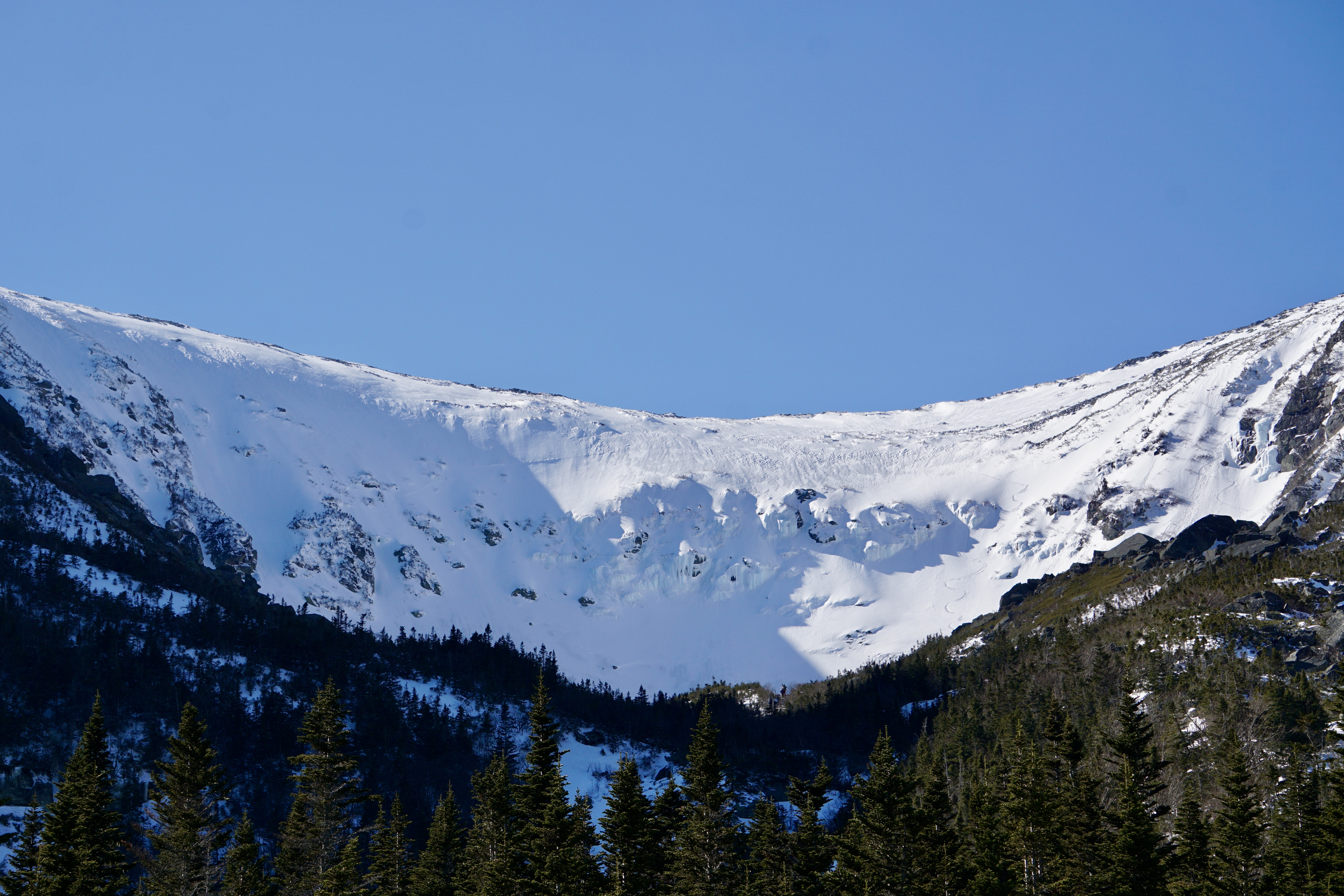
Tuckerman Ravine viewed from Hermit Pond. Note the evidence of a recent avalanche on the headwall's center left.

In 1933 the Civilian Conservation Corps started to cut ski trails in the White Mountains, including the Richard Taft racing trail on Cannon Mountain, and later the John Sherburne Ski Trail on Mount Washington, which runs from what is today the Hermit Lake cabin down to the Pinkham Notch Visitors Center operated by the Appalachian Mountain Club. The headwall was first run by two Dartmouth students, John Carleton and Charles Proctor, on April 11, 1931, and was quickly followed by a group from Harvard who skied the headwall from the summit of Mount Washington for the first time. The ravine soon became an important site for extreme skiing in New England.

=== American Inferno races ===
Races held in the 1930s attracted large groups of spectators and skiers. Harvard-Dartmouth slaloms, Olympic tryouts, and giant slaloms all were held in the ravine in that decade. But the races that caught the imagination more than any other, the races that still are talked about by Tuckerman skiers, were the three American Infernos of the 1930s. Two years after the headwall was first run on April 11, 1931, by Dartmouth men John Carleton and Charles N. Proctor, the Ski Club Hochgebirge proposed a 4.2-mile (6.8 km) summit-to-base race on Mt. Washington, to be called the American Inferno, named for a similar race held in Mürren, Switzerland. The first race was held on April 16, 1933, and was won by Hollis Phillips in 14 minutes, 41.3 seconds. The following year's race was won by Dick Durrance, who beat Phillips' record and completed the course in 12 minutes, 35 seconds.

In the late winter of 1939, several veteran skiers proposed a repeat Inferno top-to-bottom race due to the ravine's deep snowpack. The 1939 American Inferno is remembered for Toni Matt's split-second decision to ski a straight line from the crest of the headwall down through the bowl's full run. A recent Austrian immigrant, Matt had recently won a number of downhill ski races, including the Sun Valley Open Downhill, the Mount Greylock No-Fall Race, the Eastern Downhill Championships at Stowe, the Hochgebirge Downhill at Franconia, and the National Downhill Championships at Mount Hood. At a 50-year anniversary party in 1989, Matt recalled his descent:

"I went right and then left and then right and then said, well, now is the time to straighten them out. So I did and I kept waiting. Finally I dropped over the Lip...So I schussed on top of the Lip, went over it, and by that time, you're doing maybe 80 miles an hour and there's no sense in turning, especially if you can't turn well. So you say, well, you might as well go straight, you know, and hope for the best. So [I] went straight and hoped for the best."

Matt completed his ski run in 6 minutes and 29.4 seconds, reaching a top speed of 85 miles per hour (137 km/h). After a leg injury, he retired from ski racing in 1951, but continued to coach and officiate internationally until his retirement after the 1980 Lake Placid Olympics. In 1967 he was inducted into the Ski Hall of Fame. A shortened course was run in the spring of 1952 (because of a cloud-shrouded summit) that started just above the lip of the headwall, and was won by Dartmouth's Bill Beck.

== See also ==
- Presidential Range
- White Mountain National Forest
- Outline of New Hampshire
- Tuckerman Brewing Company
