= Mount Madison =

Mountain in New Hampshire, United States

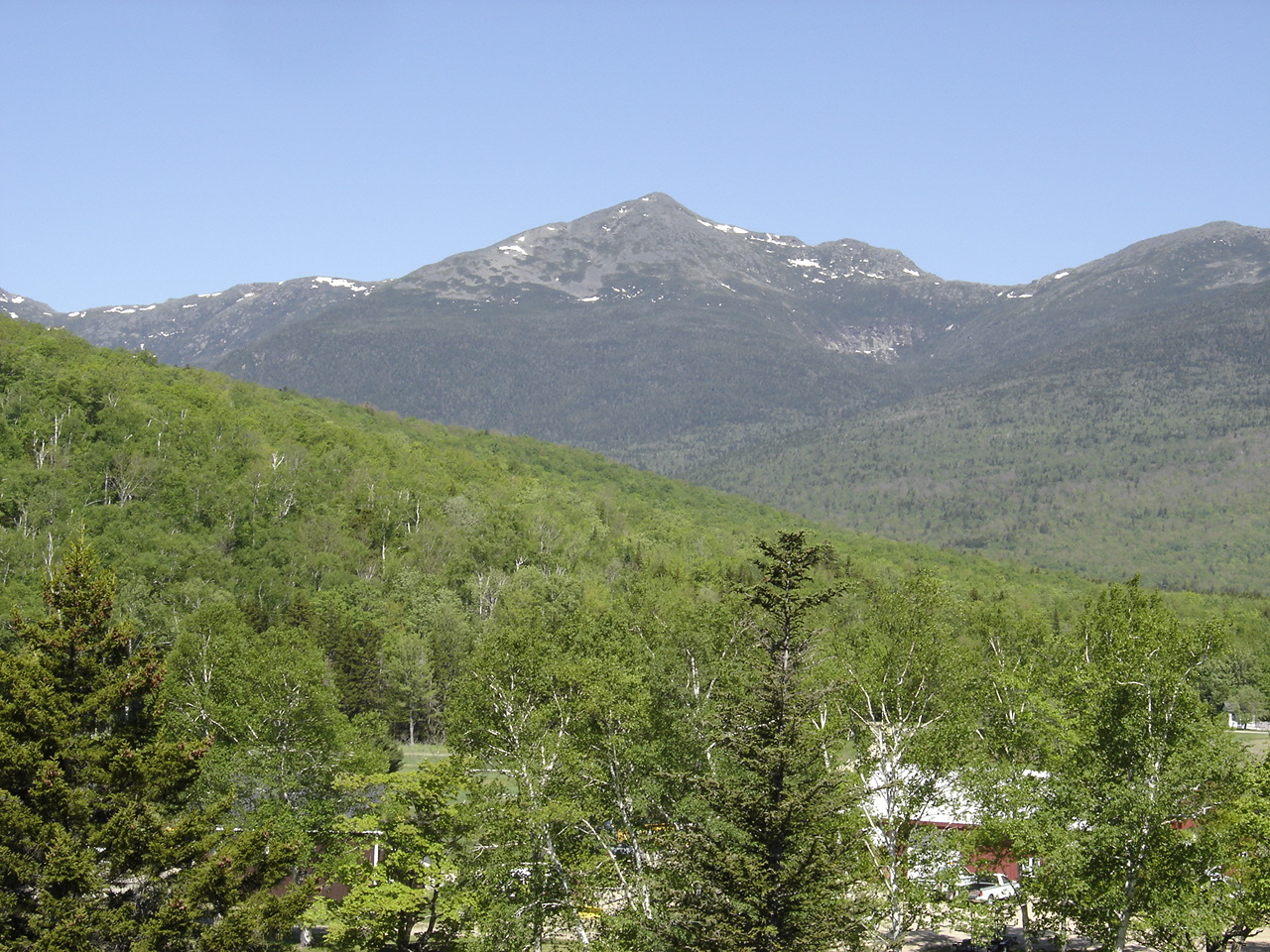
- East elevation of Mount Madison, seen from New Hampshire Route 16

Highest point
- Elevation: 5,367 ft (1,636 m)
- Prominence: 466 ft (142 m)
- Parent peak: Mount John Quincy Adams
- Listing: White Mountain 4000-Footers
- Coordinates: 44°19′44″N 71°16′36″W

Geography
- Location within New Hampshire Location within the United States
- Country: United States
- State: New Hampshire
- District: Coös County
- Subdivision(s): Low and Burbank's Grant, Thompson & Meserve's Purchase
- Parent range: Presidential Range
- Topo map: USGS Mount Washington

Climbing
- Easiest route: Hike

Mount Madison is a 5,367-foot (1,636 m) mountain in the Presidential Range of New Hampshire in the United States. It is named after the fourth U.S. President, James Madison.

Mountains in the Presidential Range are named for U.S. presidents, with the tallest (Mount Washington) named for the first president, the second tallest (Mount Adams) for the second president, and so on. However, due to a surveying error, Mount Monroe, named after the fifth president, James Monroe, is actually 22 feet (6.7 m) taller than Mount Madison.

There are many hiking trails on the mountain. A stretch of the Appalachian Trail traverses just below its summit on the Osgood Trail. The Madison Spring Hut, maintained by the Appalachian Mountain Club, is nestled between Mount Madison and Mount Adams and provides rustic lodging in the summer. Reservations generally need to be made far in advance.

Mount Madison is the northernmost peak in the Presidentials. Like most of the range, its summit is above treeline. Due to high winds and low temperatures, hypothermia is a danger even in the summer.

== Gallery ==
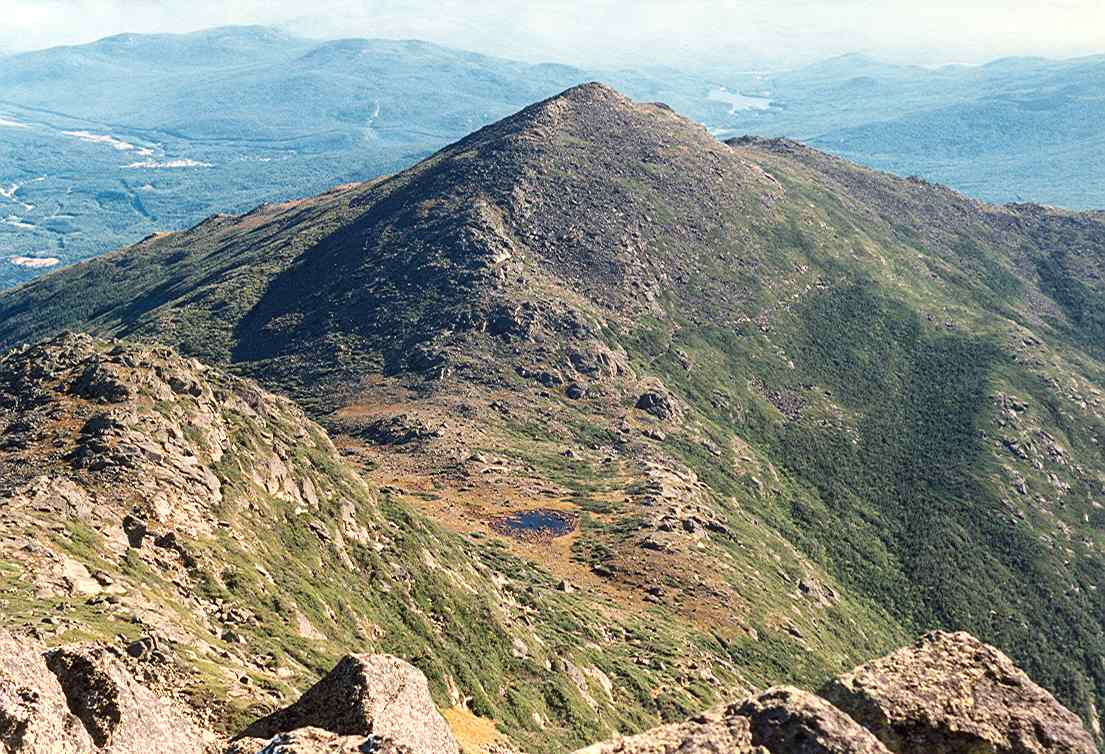
Mount Madison seen from Mount Adams' summit

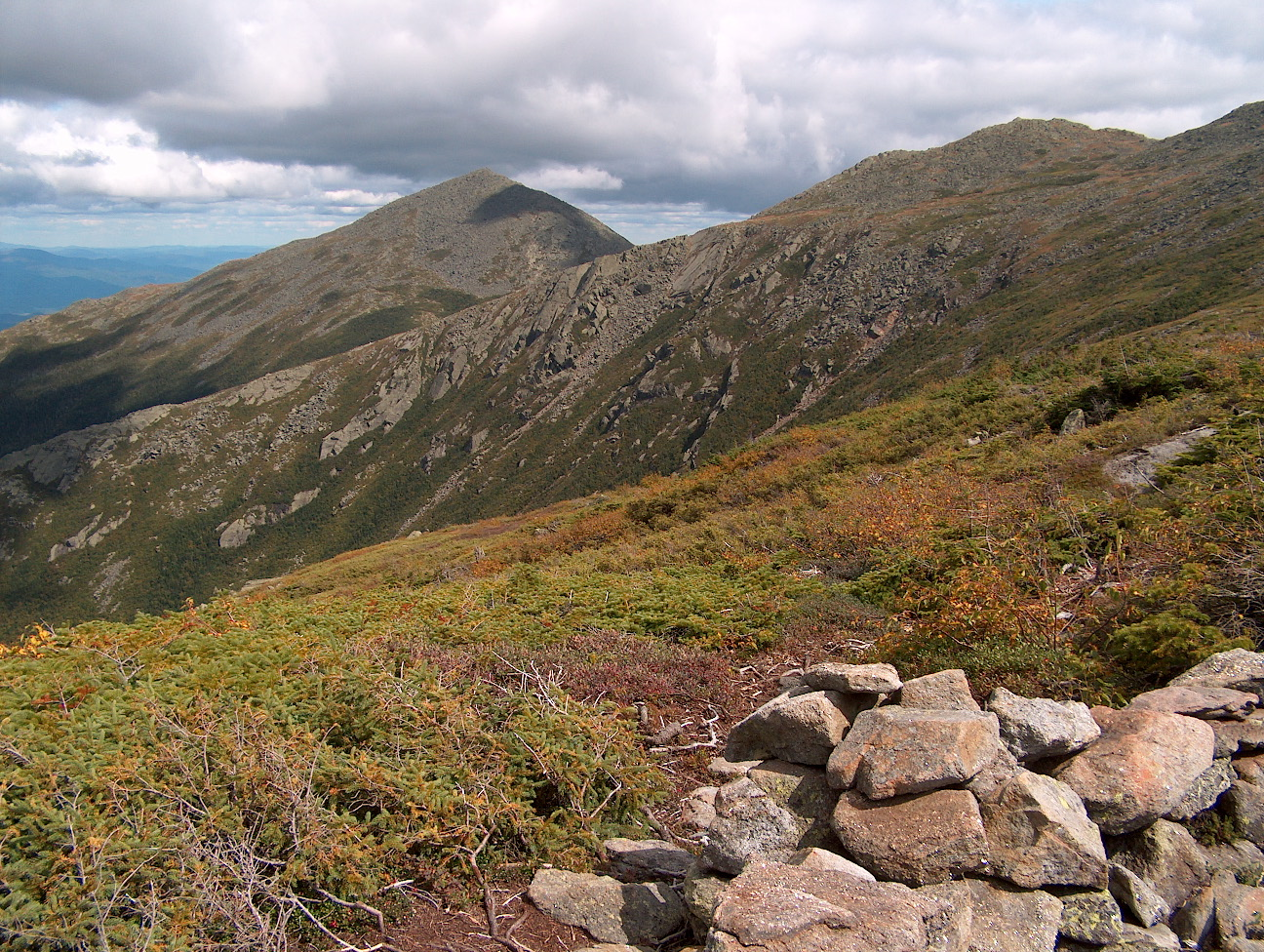
Mount Madison from Mount Adams

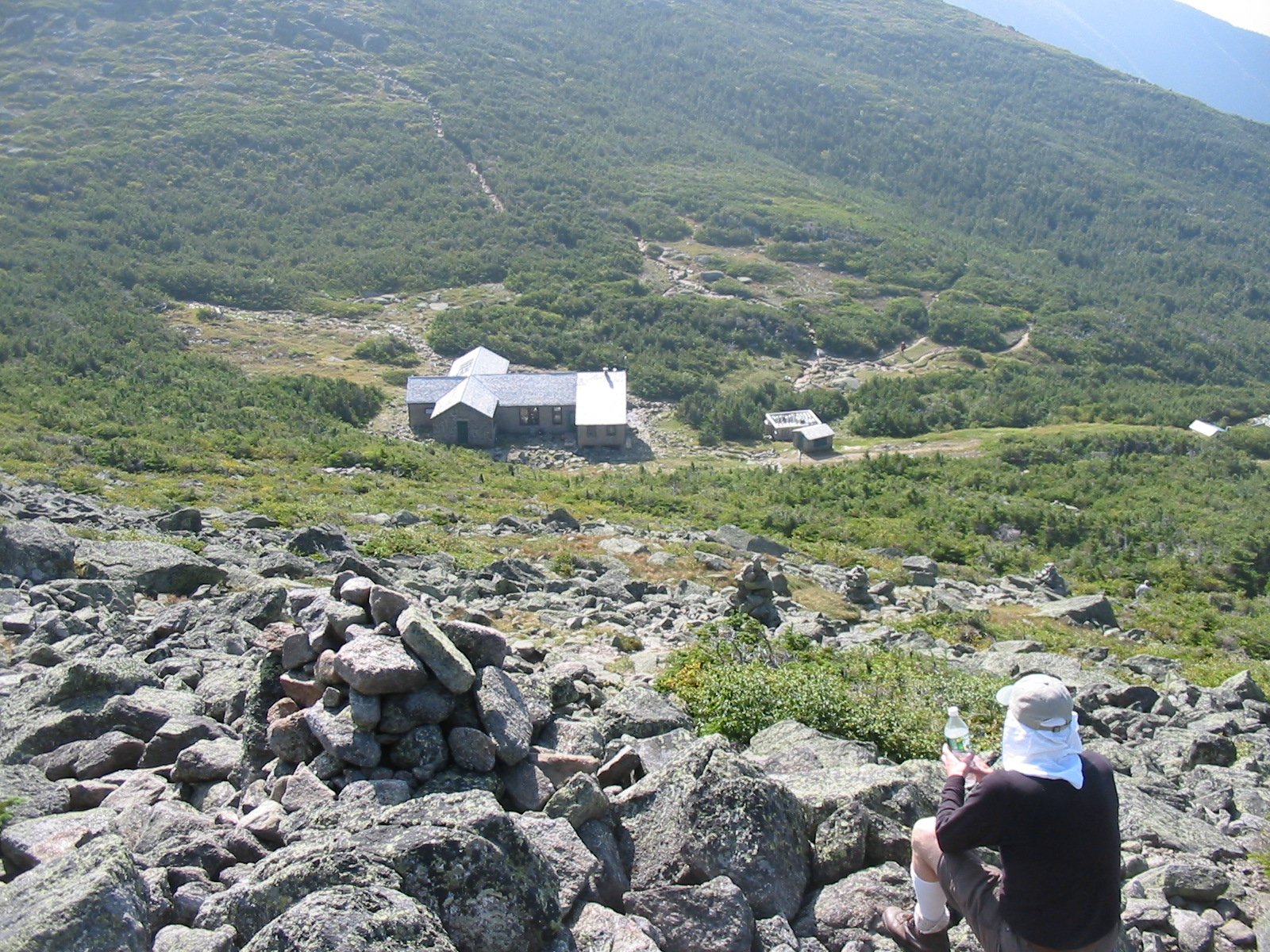
Madison Spring Hut in the col between Mount Madison and Mount Adams

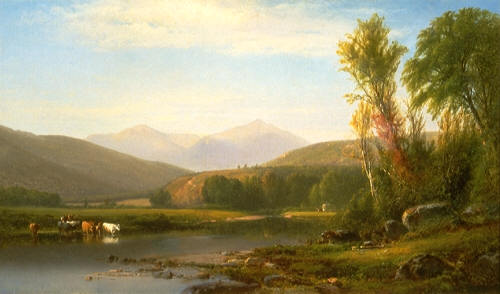
Mount Madison from the Androscoggin River, by William Hart, 1862

== Climate ==
There is no weather station at the summit, but this climate table contains interpolated data for an area around the summit. Mount Madison has a subarctic climate (Köppen Dfc).

Climate data for Mount Madison 44.3260 N, 71.2845 W, Elevation: 4,865 ft (1,483 m) (1991–2020 normals)
Month	Jan	Feb	Mar	Apr	May	Jun	Jul	Aug	Sep	Oct	Nov	Dec	Year
Mean daily maximum °F (°C)	16.5 (−8.6)	17.9 (−7.8)	24.0 (−4.4)	34.3 (1.3)	47.3 (8.5)	55.8 (13.2)	60.2 (15.7)	59.0 (15.0)	53.4 (11.9)	41.1 (5.1)	30.3 (−0.9)	22.2 (−5.4)	38.5 (3.6)
Daily mean °F (°C)	8.8 (−12.9)	9.8 (−12.3)	16.3 (−8.7)	27.6 (−2.4)	41.4 (5.2)	50.7 (10.4)	55.7 (13.2)	54.2 (12.3)	47.9 (8.8)	35.3 (1.8)	23.9 (−4.5)	14.4 (−9.8)	32.2 (0.1)
Mean daily minimum °F (°C)	1.0 (−17.2)	1.6 (−16.9)	8.5 (−13.1)	20.8 (−6.2)	35.5 (1.9)	45.7 (7.6)	51.1 (10.6)	49.5 (9.7)	42.4 (5.8)	29.5 (−1.4)	17.5 (−8.1)	6.7 (−14.1)	25.8 (−3.4)
Average precipitation inches (mm)	5.56 (141)	5.04 (128)	6.20 (157)	7.13 (181)	6.80 (173)	7.91 (201)	7.99 (203)	6.64 (169)	6.70 (170)	9.80 (249)	7.67 (195)	7.09 (180)	84.53 (2,147)
Source: PRISM Climate Group

== See also ==
- Four-thousand footers of New Hampshire
- Randolph Mountain Club
