= Dry River (New Hampshire) =

- The Dry River as it enters Crawford Notch State Park

- Location within New Hampshire Location within the United States

Location
- Country: United States
- State: New Hampshire
- Counties: Coos, Carroll
- Region: White Mountains

Physical characteristics
- Source: Oakes Gulf
  - location: Sargents Purchase
  - coordinates: 44°15′1″N 71°18′43″W
  - elevation: 4,180 ft (1,270 m)
- Mouth: Saco River
  - location: Harts Location
  - coordinates: 44°8′41″N 71°21′40″W
  - elevation: 1,090 ft (330 m)
- Length: 9.0 mi (14.5 km)

The Dry River is a 9.0-mile-long (14.5 km) river in the White Mountains of New Hampshire in the United States. It is a tributary of the Saco River, which flows to the Atlantic Ocean in Maine. For nearly its entire length, it is within the Presidential Range-Dry River Wilderness of the White Mountain National Forest.

The Dry River rises in Oakes Gulf, a glacial cirque on the southern slopes of Mount Washington, the highest peak in the northeastern United States. The river flows southwest through a wooded mountain valley between the southern part of the Presidential Range to its west and the lower Montalban Ridge, including Mount Isolation, to its east. It is paralleled for its entire distance through the wilderness area by the Dry River Trail.

The river ends in Crawford Notch State Park, where it joins the Saco River.

== Wilderness ==
Established in 1975 by the U.S. Congress, the Dry River is the centerpiece to the Presidential Range-Dry River Wilderness and is protected as part of the National Wilderness Preservation System. This 27,605-acre (11,171 ha) wilderness area is managed by the U.S. Forest Service.

== See also ==
- List of rivers of New Hampshire
