= Mount Adams (New Hampshire) =

Mountain in New Hampshire, United States

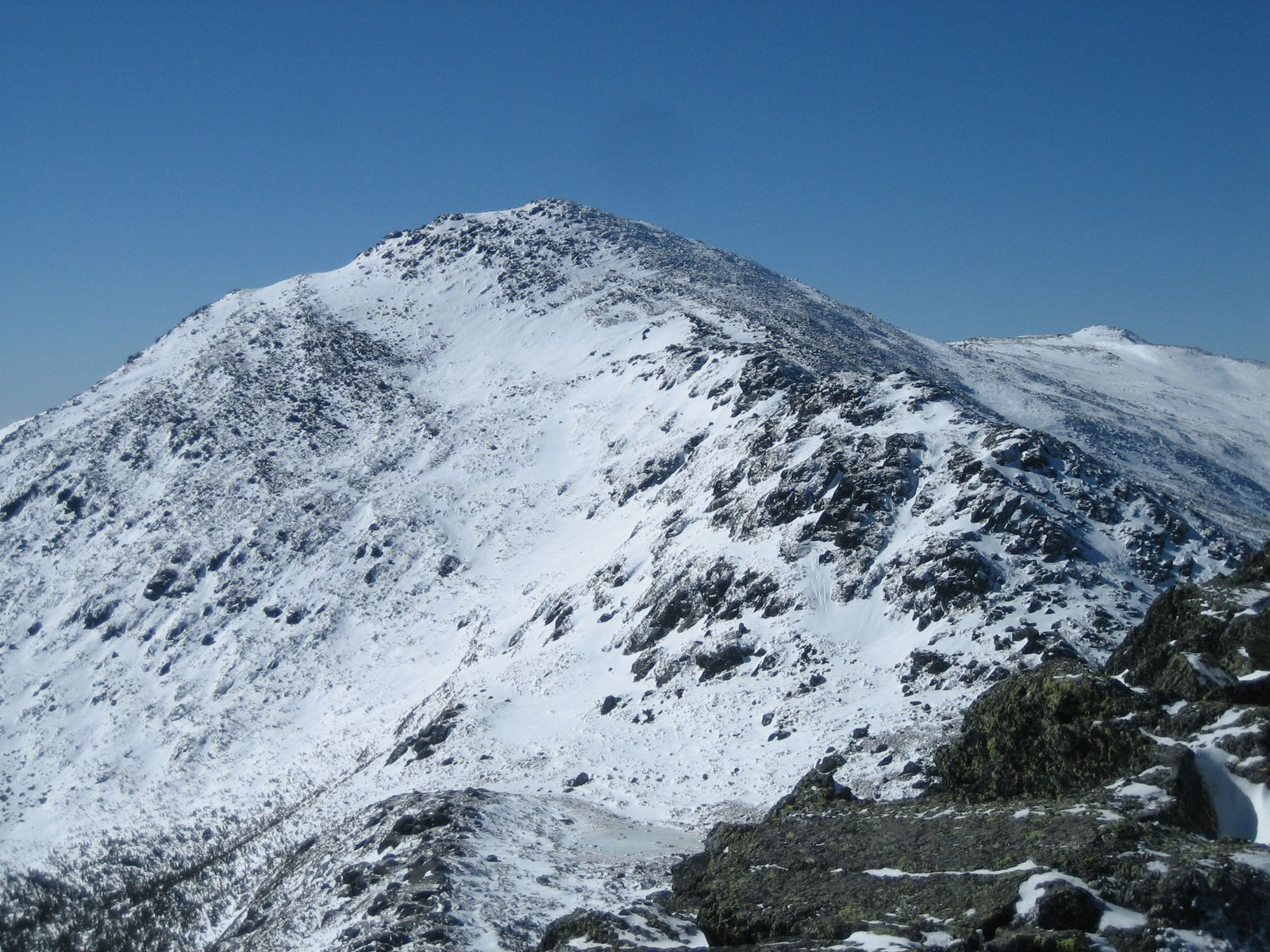
- Mount Adams viewed from the summit of Mount Madison

Highest point
- Elevation: 5,793 ft (1,766 m)
- Prominence: 804 ft (245 m)
- Listing: White Mountain 4000-Footers
- Coordinates: 44°19′14″N 71°17′29″W

Geography
- Location within New Hampshire
- Location: Coos County, New Hampshire, U.S.
- Parent range: Presidential Range
- Topo map: USGS Mount Washington

Climbing
- Easiest route: Hike

Mount Adams, elevation 5,793 feet (1,766 m) above sea level, is a mountain in New Hampshire, the second highest peak in the Northeast United States after its nearby neighbor, Mount Washington. Located in the northern Presidential Range, Mount Adams was named after John Adams, the second President of the United States. It was given this name on July 31, 1820. To the northeast is Mount Madison and to the southwest is Mount Jefferson. From the summit, Mount Washington can be seen directly to the south.

There are two major subsidiary peaks of Mount Adams: Mount Sam Adams and Mount Quincy Adams, named after John Adams' cousin, Revolutionary leader Samuel Adams, and son, President John Quincy Adams, respectively, and two minor sub-peaks, Abigail Adams (named for John Adams' wife Abigail) and Adams 5. The northern side of the mountain ridge is located in Low and Burbank's Grant, and the end of Durand Ridge, and King Ravine, on the north side of Mount Adams are in the town of Randolph (formerly Durand). The entire south side of the mountain ridge is in Thompson and Meserve's Purchase.

The Appalachian Trail traverses the col between Mount Adams and Mount Sam Adams on the Gulfside Trail. The Randolph Mountain Club (RMC) maintains the trails and several huts and shelters high on Mount Adams' north side, including "The Perch", "Crag Camp", "The Log Cabin", and "Gray Knob". A large network of hiking and climbing paths lead south to the huts and ridges from several parking areas located on U.S. Highway 2.

== Climbing and recreation ==
Mount Adams is a popular hiking and climbing destination for experienced and novice mountaineers alike. The mountain is climbed in all four seasons, although it is more often climbed from late spring through early fall. The peak is known to have dangerously erratic weather, especially in winter. There is a prominent sign just prior to the most exposed section of Mount Adams urging hikers to turn around at the first sign of inclement weather. Winter hiking anywhere in the White Mountains requires specialized equipment and skills, as severe storms can develop suddenly. High winds and low temperatures can combine to make winter conditions on Mount Adams approximately equal to the worst reported from Antarctica.

There are numerous direct routes to the summit of Mount Adams. All routes are considered either Class 1 or Class 2, involve about 4 miles (6 km) to 5 miles (8 km) each way, and gain approximately 4,500 feet (1,400 m) in elevation. One popular route on Adams year-round is the Valley Way, which connects with the Gulfside Trail and Lowe's Path. The Air Line is considered the standard winter route on Mount Adams, as it is perhaps the most direct route to the summit. The route gains about 4,500 feet (1,400 m) in elevation over about 4.3 miles (6.9 km) from trailhead to summit. The last 1,000 feet of this route are extremely exposed, leaving mountaineers vulnerable to the storms known to frequent mountains in the Presidential Range.

Due to their relative proximity, Mount Adams and nearby Mount Madison are frequently climbed on the same day by mountaineers. A hike to both summits includes a round trip of about 10.4 miles (16.7 km) and cumulative elevation gain of more than 5,000 feet (1,500 m). The route begins on the Valley Way, which brings hikers to the Madison Hut. From the Madison Hut, hikers can then access the summits of both Mount Madison and Mount Adams.

== Climate ==
Climate data for Mount Adams 44.3188 N, 71.2926 W, Elevation: 5,246 ft (1,599 m) (1991–2020 normals)
Month	Jan	Feb	Mar	Apr	May	Jun	Jul	Aug	Sep	Oct	Nov	Dec	Year
Mean daily maximum °F (°C)	15.4 (−9.2)	16.3 (−8.7)	22.7 (−5.2)	33.0 (0.6)	46.0 (7.8)	54.6 (12.6)	58.9 (14.9)	57.7 (14.3)	51.9 (11.1)	39.6 (4.2)	29.2 (−1.6)	21.2 (−6.0)	37.2 (2.9)
Daily mean °F (°C)	7.4 (−13.7)	8.2 (−13.2)	14.9 (−9.5)	26.4 (−3.1)	40.1 (4.5)	49.5 (9.7)	54.5 (12.5)	53.0 (11.7)	46.7 (8.2)	34.1 (1.2)	22.9 (−5.1)	13.6 (−10.2)	30.9 (−0.6)
Mean daily minimum °F (°C)	−0.6 (−18.1)	0.0 (−17.8)	7.2 (−13.8)	19.8 (−6.8)	34.3 (1.3)	44.5 (6.9)	50.0 (10.0)	48.3 (9.1)	41.5 (5.3)	28.6 (−1.9)	16.5 (−8.6)	5.9 (−14.5)	24.7 (−4.1)
Average precipitation inches (mm)	5.74 (146)	5.11 (130)	6.35 (161)	7.34 (186)	6.95 (177)	8.54 (217)	8.06 (205)	6.87 (174)	6.78 (172)	9.88 (251)	8.00 (203)	7.27 (185)	86.89 (2,207)
Source: PRISM Climate Group

== See also ==
- Thomas Starr King
- Four-thousand footers of New Hampshire
- List of people who died on the Presidential Range
