= Mount Isolation =

Mountain in New Hampshire, United States

Highest point
- Elevation: 4,003 ft (1,220 m) NGVD 29
- Prominence: 203 ft (62 m)
- Listing: White Mountain 4000-Footers
- Coordinates: 44°12′53″N 71°18′33″W

Geography
- Location: Coös County, New Hampshire, U.S.
- Parent range: Presidential Range
- Topo map: USGS Stairs Mountain

Mount Isolation is a mountain located in Coos County, New Hampshire. The mountain is part of the Presidential Range of the White Mountains. Mount Isolation is the highest peak on the Montalban Ridge which extends south from Boott Spur.

Isolation is in the Presidential Range–Dry River Wilderness, and as its name implies, is one of the most remote White Mountain peaks. Isolation just qualifies as one of the Appalachian Mountain Club's "Four-thousand footers", having the requisite 4,000 feet (1,219 m) of elevation and 200 feet (61 m) of prominence.

== Climate ==
Climate data for Mount Isolation 44.2201 N, 71.3068 W, Elevation: 3,727 ft (1,136 m) (1991–2020 normals)
Month	Jan	Feb	Mar	Apr	May	Jun	Jul	Aug	Sep	Oct	Nov	Dec	Year
Mean daily maximum °F (°C)	19.6 (−6.9)	22.6 (−5.2)	29.1 (−1.6)	41.2 (5.1)	54.3 (12.4)	62.4 (16.9)	67.2 (19.6)	65.7 (18.7)	60.2 (15.7)	47.7 (8.7)	35.1 (1.7)	25.2 (−3.8)	44.2 (6.8)
Daily mean °F (°C)	11.9 (−11.2)	14.0 (−10.0)	20.3 (−6.5)	32.3 (0.2)	45.2 (7.3)	53.9 (12.2)	58.9 (14.9)	57.6 (14.2)	51.7 (10.9)	39.8 (4.3)	28.5 (−1.9)	18.5 (−7.5)	36.1 (2.2)
Mean daily minimum °F (°C)	4.2 (−15.4)	5.3 (−14.8)	11.5 (−11.4)	23.5 (−4.7)	36.0 (2.2)	45.5 (7.5)	50.6 (10.3)	49.6 (9.8)	43.1 (6.2)	32.0 (0.0)	21.9 (−5.6)	11.7 (−11.3)	27.9 (−2.3)
Average precipitation inches (mm)	5.11 (130)	4.58 (116)	5.52 (140)	6.43 (163)	6.12 (155)	7.01 (178)	6.99 (178)	5.97 (152)	5.90 (150)	8.73 (222)	6.81 (173)	6.45 (164)	75.62 (1,921)
Source: PRISM Climate Group

Climate data for North Isolation 44.2365 N, 71.3032 W, Elevation: 4,121 ft (1,256 m) (1991–2020 normals)
Month	Jan	Feb	Mar	Apr	May	Jun	Jul	Aug	Sep	Oct	Nov	Dec	Year
Mean daily maximum °F (°C)	19.0 (−7.2)	20.9 (−6.2)	27.4 (−2.6)	39.0 (3.9)	52.2 (11.2)	60.2 (15.7)	65.0 (18.3)	63.5 (17.5)	58.0 (14.4)	45.9 (7.7)	33.8 (1.0)	24.5 (−4.2)	42.4 (5.8)
Daily mean °F (°C)	11.1 (−11.6)	12.6 (−10.8)	19.0 (−7.2)	30.7 (−0.7)	43.7 (6.5)	52.6 (11.4)	57.5 (14.2)	56.1 (13.4)	50.2 (10.1)	38.5 (3.6)	27.3 (−2.6)	17.5 (−8.1)	34.7 (1.5)
Mean daily minimum °F (°C)	3.3 (−15.9)	4.2 (−15.4)	10.5 (−11.9)	22.5 (−5.3)	35.3 (1.8)	44.9 (7.2)	50.0 (10.0)	48.8 (9.3)	42.3 (5.7)	31.1 (−0.5)	20.7 (−6.3)	10.5 (−11.9)	27.0 (−2.8)
Average precipitation inches (mm)	5.38 (137)	4.91 (125)	6.02 (153)	6.88 (175)	6.59 (167)	7.65 (194)	7.84 (199)	6.52 (166)	6.51 (165)	9.36 (238)	7.41 (188)	6.91 (176)	81.98 (2,083)
Source: PRISM Climate Group

== See also ==
- List of mountains in New Hampshire
- White Mountain National Forest
