= Presidential Range =

Mountain range in the White Mountains of New Hampshire, US

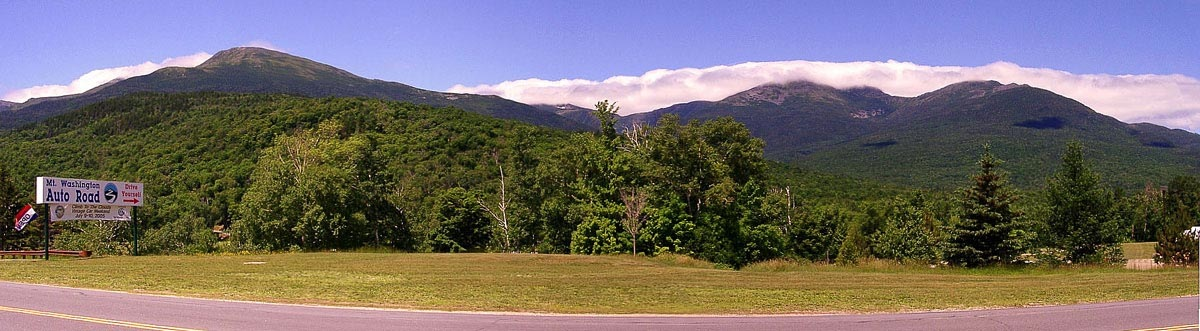
- The Presidential Range viewed from Pinkham Notch

Highest point
- Peak: Mount Washington
- Elevation: 6,288 ft (1,917 m)
- Coordinates: 44°16′14.98″N 71°18′12.54″W

Naming
- Etymology: U.S. presidents

Geography
- Country: United States
- State: New Hampshire
- Region: New England
- Parent range: White Mountains

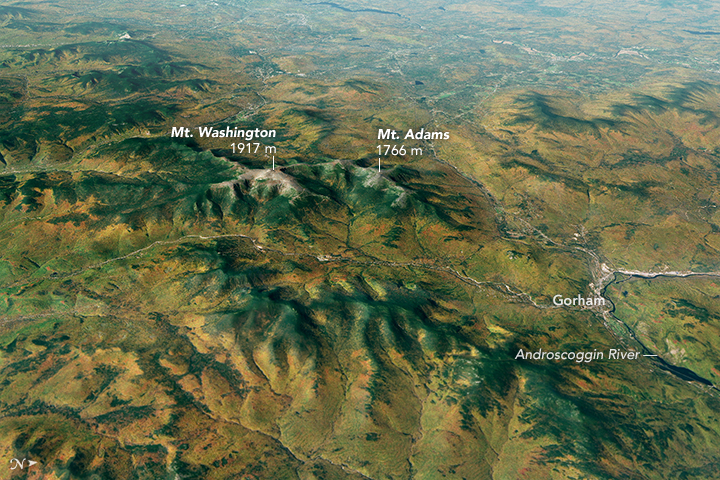
Computer-generated image from satellite data of the Presidential Range, 2014

The Presidential Range is a mountain range located in the White Mountains of the U.S. state of New Hampshire. It contains the highest peaks of the Whites, the most notable of which are named for American presidents, followed by prominent public figures of the 18th and 19th centuries. The Presidential Range is notorious for having some of the worst weather on Earth, mainly because of the unpredictability of high wind speeds and whiteout conditions on the higher summits. Because of the poor weather conditions, the Presidential Range is often used for mountaineering training for those who go on to climb some of the world's highest mountains, including K2 and Everest.

Mount Washington, long home of the highest winds recorded on the surface of the Earth at 231 mph (372 km/h), is the tallest at 6,288 ft (1,917 m), followed by neighboring peaks Mount Adams at 5,793 ft (1,766 m) and Mount Jefferson at 5,712 ft (1,741 m). The range is almost entirely in Coos County.

== Notable summits ==
The highest mountains in the Presidential Range are named principally for U.S. presidents, with the tallest mountain (Mount Washington) named for the first president and the second tallest (Mount Adams) for the second president.

Notable summits from southwest to northeast
Summit	Named after	Notes	Peak Bagging's 4,000 footers
Mount Webster	Daniel Webster		X mark
Mount Jackson	Charles Thomas Jackson	19th-century geologist	check
Mount Pierce	Franklin Pierce	formerly Mt. Clinton — after DeWitt Clinton	check
Mount Eisenhower	Dwight D. Eisenhower		check
Mount Franklin	Benjamin Franklin		X mark
Mount Monroe	James Monroe		check
Mount Washington	George Washington	A general at time of naming in 1784, and only later a president	check
Mount Clay	Henry Clay	State of New Hampshire changed name to Mount Reagan after Ronald Reagan; U.S. government still recognizes Clay name	X mark
Mount Jefferson	Thomas Jefferson		check
Mount Sam Adams	Samuel Adams		X mark
Mount Adams	John Adams		check
Mount Quincy Adams	John Quincy Adams		X mark
Mount Madison	James Madison		check

Mount Adams has four subsidiary peaks besides its summit that are also commonly recognized by name. Two are listed above (Sam Adams and John Quincy Adams). The third and fourth are:

- Mount Abigail Adams (formerly Adams IV)
- Adams V

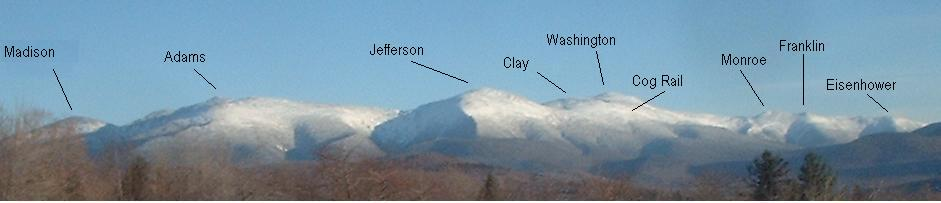
Presidential Range in winter (summits and Cog Railway labeled)

== Other summits ==
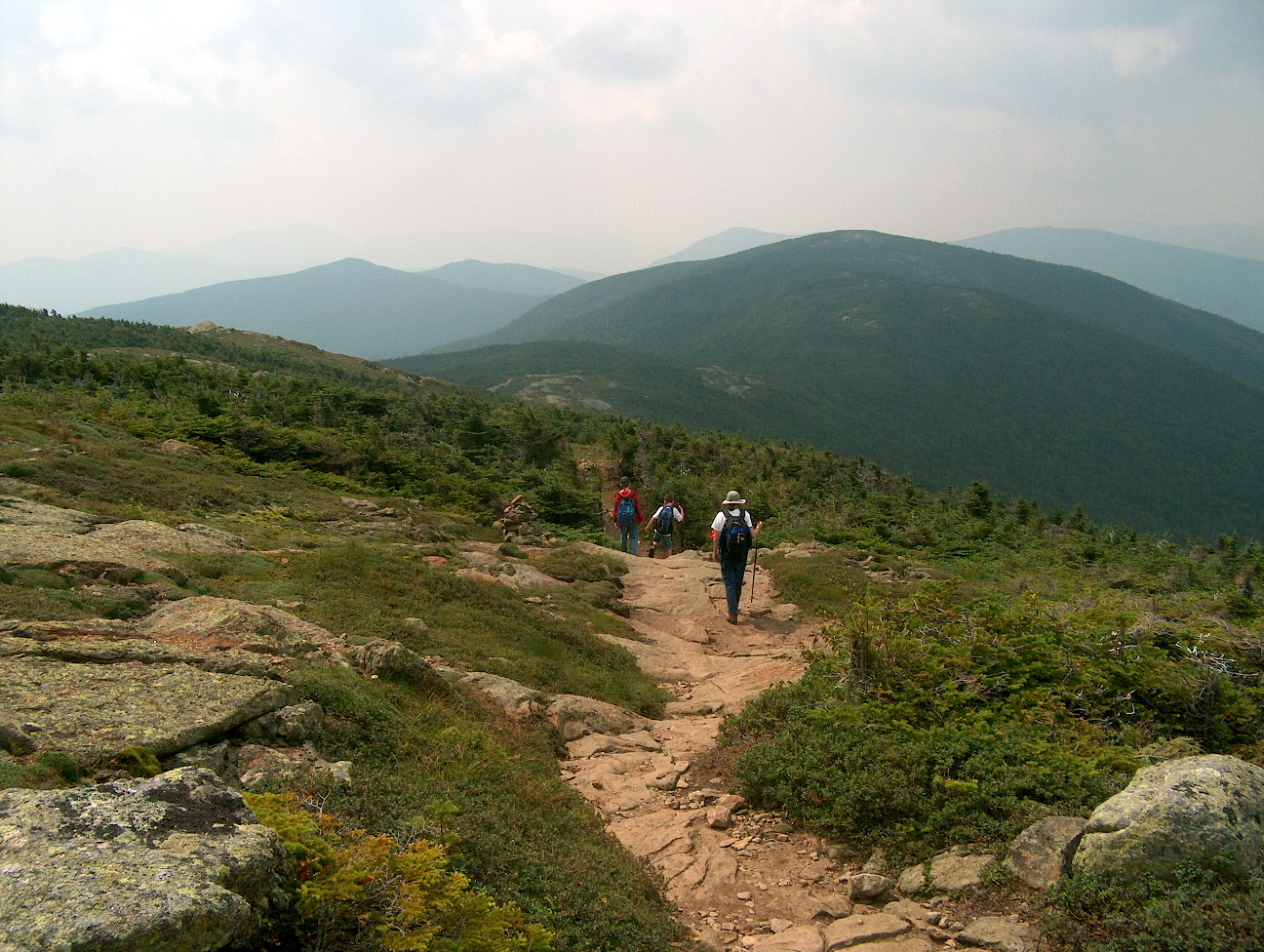
The Appalachian Trail in the southern Presidential Range

Aside from the notable summits, the Presidential Range contains a number of additional named peaks. Several of these peaks, drained on their west faces by the Dry River, are less accessible than the main and most-visited ridge of the range.

Subsidiary peaks of Mount Washington:

- Ball Crag (6,106 ft)
- Nelson Crag (5,620 ft)
- Boott Spur (5,500 ft)

North from Mount Washington:

- Mount Bowman (3,449 ft) (spur of Mount Jefferson)

South from Mount Washington:

- Engine Hill (3,100 ft)
- Maple Mountain (2,601 ft)
- Iron Mountain (2,726 ft)
- Montalban Ridge:
  - Mount Isolation (4,004 ft)*
  - Mount Davis (3,819 ft)
  - Stairs Mountain (3,463 ft)
  - Mount Resolution (3,415 ft)
- Bemis Ridge:
  - Mount Crawford (3,119 ft)
  - Mount Hope (2,505 ft)
- Mount Parker (3,004 ft)
- Mount Langdon (2,390 ft)
- Mount Pickering (1,945 ft) (family name of first president of Appalachian Mountain Club)
- Mount Stanton (1,716 ft)

The summits marked with an asterisk (*) are included on the peak-bagging list of 4,000-foot and higher mountains in New Hampshire; the others are excluded, in some cases because of lesser height and in others because of more technical criteria.

== Watersheds ==
The Presidentials separate drainage via the Saco and Androscoggin rivers into the Atlantic Ocean on the coast of Maine, from drainage into the Israel and Ammonoosuc rivers, thence into the Connecticut River, and thence into Long Island Sound.

== Presidential Traverse ==
The so-called Presidential Traverse is a hike that traverses each major summit along the 19 miles (31 km) of the Presidential ridge. The traverse encompasses over 8,500 feet (2,600 m) in elevation gain. It can be done in a single day in summer, but during winter it is generally a two- to four-day venture. The traverse is considered strenuous.

== Hazards ==
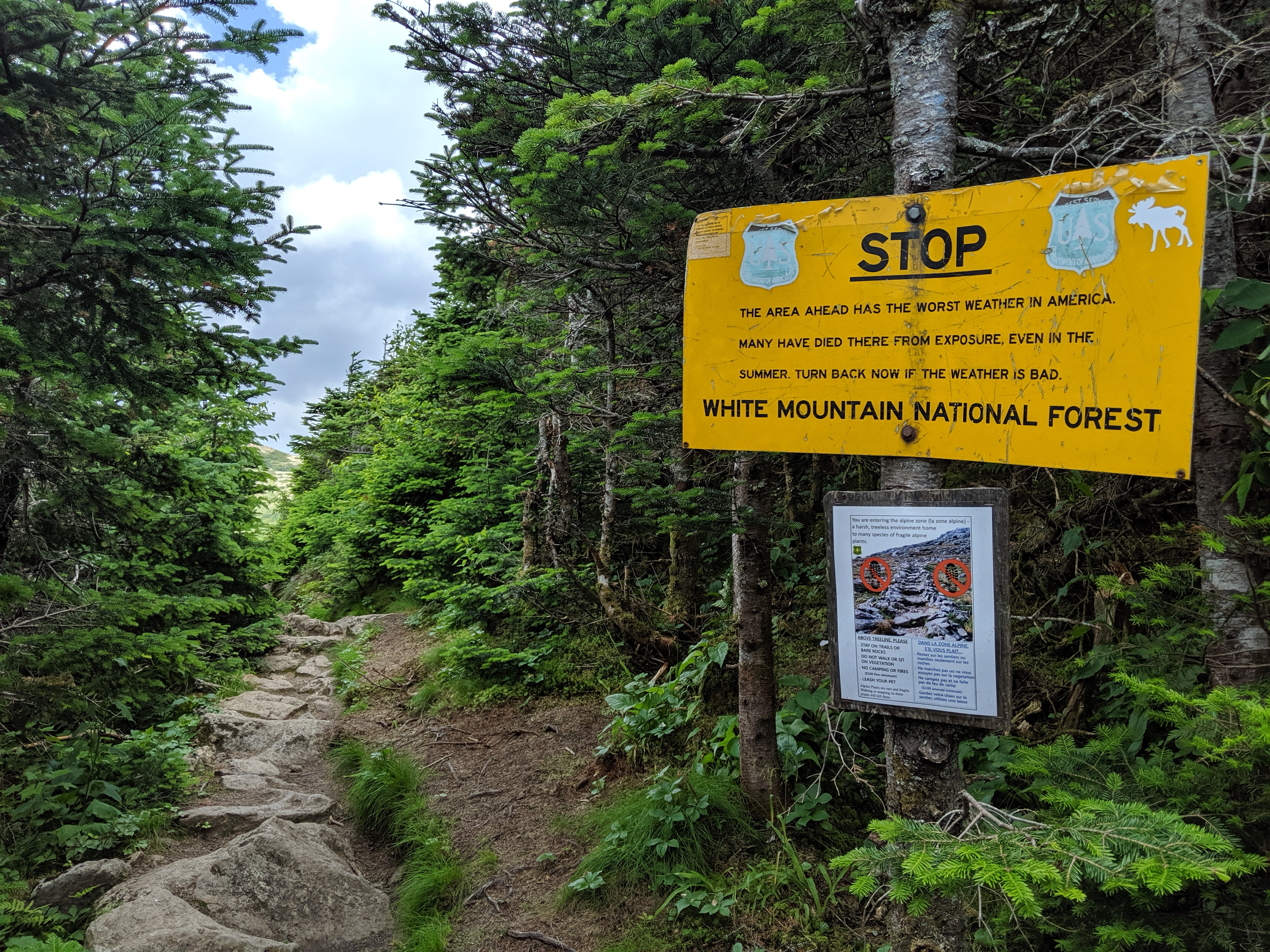
Sign warning of weather.

The range is notorious for its unpredictable and inclement weather, with some of the deadliest mountains in the continental United States. Due to its unique location relative to other geographic features, it holds the world record for highest recorded surface wind speed not within a tropical cyclone. Fatalities in this area are dominated by those that occur on Mount Washington, the highest peak in the range. The New Hampshire Fish and Game Department conducts an average of 200 rescues a year for hikers in need of assistance.

== See also ==
- List of people who died on the Presidential Range
- List of subranges of the Appalachian Mountains
