= Mount Jefferson (New Hampshire) =

Mountain in Coos County, New Hampshire

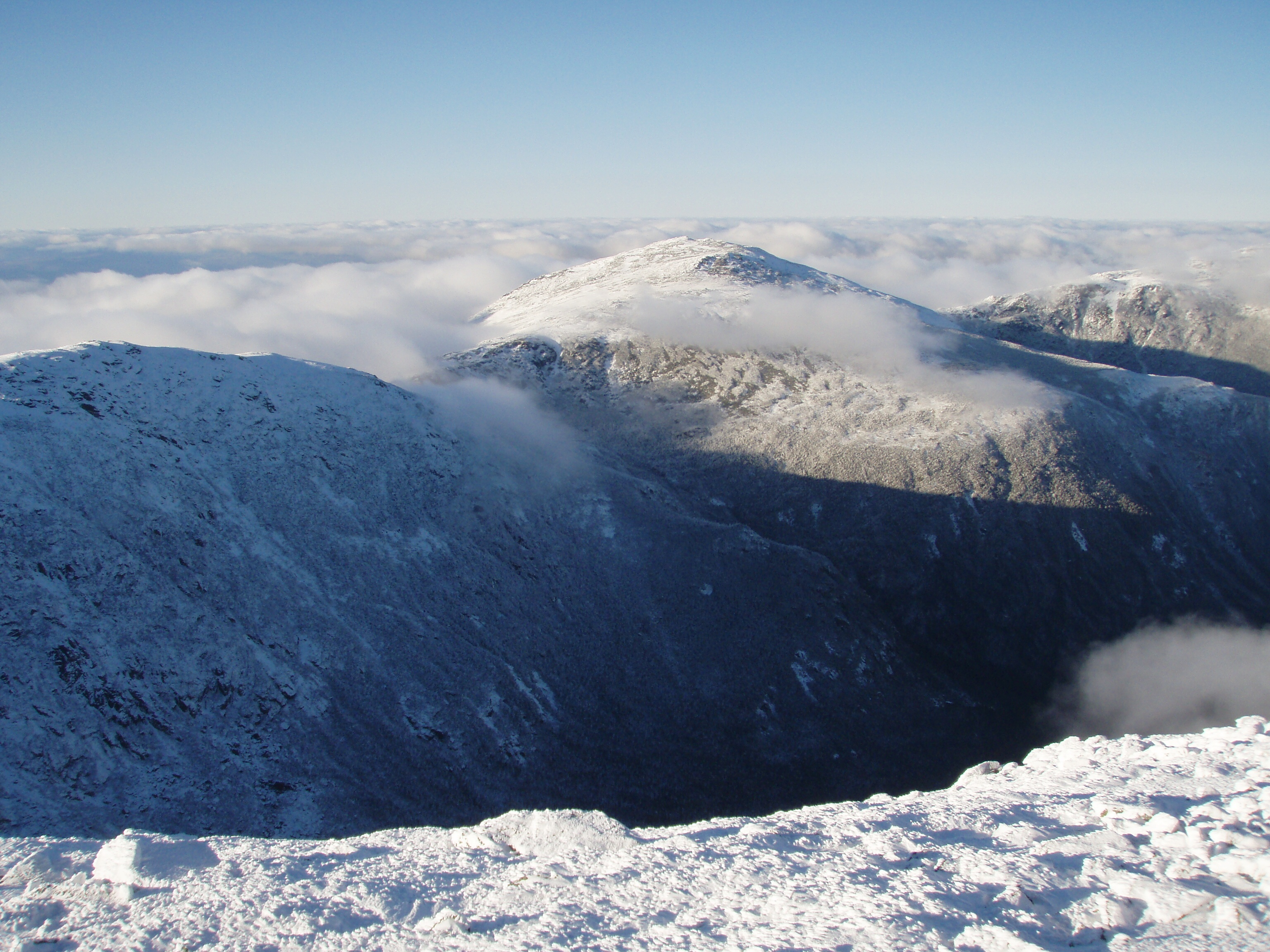
- Mount Jefferson as seen from near the summit of Mount Washington, with the Great Gulf below.

Highest point
- Elevation: 5,712 ft (1,741 m)
- Prominence: 742 ft (226 m)
- Listing: White Mountain 4000-Footers
- Coordinates: 44°18′15″N 71°19′01″W

Geography
- Location: Thompson and Meserve's Purchase, Coös County, New Hampshire, U.S.
- Parent range: Presidential Range
- Topo map: USGS Mount Washington

Climbing
- Easiest route: Caps Ridge Trail

Mount Jefferson is located in Coos County, New Hampshire, and is the third highest mountain in the state. The mountain is named after Thomas Jefferson, the third president of the United States, and is part of the Presidential Range of the White Mountains. Mount Jefferson is flanked by Mount Adams (to the northeast) and Mount Clay (to the south).

The mountain has several interesting features, making it a popular hike. Two distinct ridges lead to its summit: Ridge of the Caps and Castle Ridge. The mountain is surrounded by the three dramatic glacial cirques of Jefferson Ravine, Castle Ravine, and the Great Gulf. Finally, Monticello Lawn is a large expanse of alpine sedge and rush near the otherwise talus-covered summit cone. When viewed from the Mount Washington Auto Road, Jefferson features an arrow-shaped bald patch pointing to its summit. The summit features an almost perennial snow field on its eastern flank, that is often skiable into early summer, commonly known as The Beach.

Mount Jefferson has a direct ascent along the Caps Ridge Trail, whose base, Jefferson Notch, is the highest point of any public road in New Hampshire at 3,009 feet (917 m). This route, gaining only 2,700 feet (823 m) vertically to the summit, results in it having the least distance of ascent of any Presidential mountain (about 2.5 miles). However, climbing over the "caps" involves some exposed scrambling and can be steep and challenging at times.

== Climate ==
There is no weather station, but this climate table contains interpolated data. Mount Jefferson has a subarctic climate (Köppen Dfc).

Climate data for Mount Jefferson (NH) 44.2999 N, 71.3152 W, Elevation: 5,322 ft (1,622 m) (1991–2020 normals)
Month	Jan	Feb	Mar	Apr	May	Jun	Jul	Aug	Sep	Oct	Nov	Dec	Year
Mean daily maximum °F (°C)	15.4 (−9.2)	16.2 (−8.8)	22.7 (−5.2)	33.1 (0.6)	45.8 (7.7)	54.3 (12.4)	58.8 (14.9)	57.7 (14.3)	51.8 (11.0)	39.8 (4.3)	29.2 (−1.6)	21.1 (−6.1)	37.2 (2.9)
Daily mean °F (°C)	7.5 (−13.6)	8.1 (−13.3)	15.0 (−9.4)	26.4 (−3.1)	39.9 (4.4)	49.1 (9.5)	54.1 (12.3)	52.8 (11.6)	46.5 (8.1)	34.1 (1.2)	22.9 (−5.1)	13.6 (−10.2)	30.8 (−0.6)
Mean daily minimum °F (°C)	−0.5 (−18.1)	0.0 (−17.8)	7.3 (−13.7)	19.7 (−6.8)	33.9 (1.1)	44.0 (6.7)	49.4 (9.7)	47.9 (8.8)	41.1 (5.1)	28.4 (−2.0)	16.6 (−8.6)	6.1 (−14.4)	24.5 (−4.2)
Average precipitation inches (mm)	5.76 (146)	5.22 (133)	6.45 (164)	7.34 (186)	6.97 (177)	8.34 (212)	8.19 (208)	6.87 (174)	6.82 (173)	9.98 (253)	7.99 (203)	7.44 (189)	87.37 (2,218)
Source: PRISM Climate Group

== See also ==
- List of mountains in New Hampshire
- four-thousand footers
- White Mountain National Forest
- List of people who died on the Presidential Range
