= Boott Spur =

Mountain in New Hampshire, United States

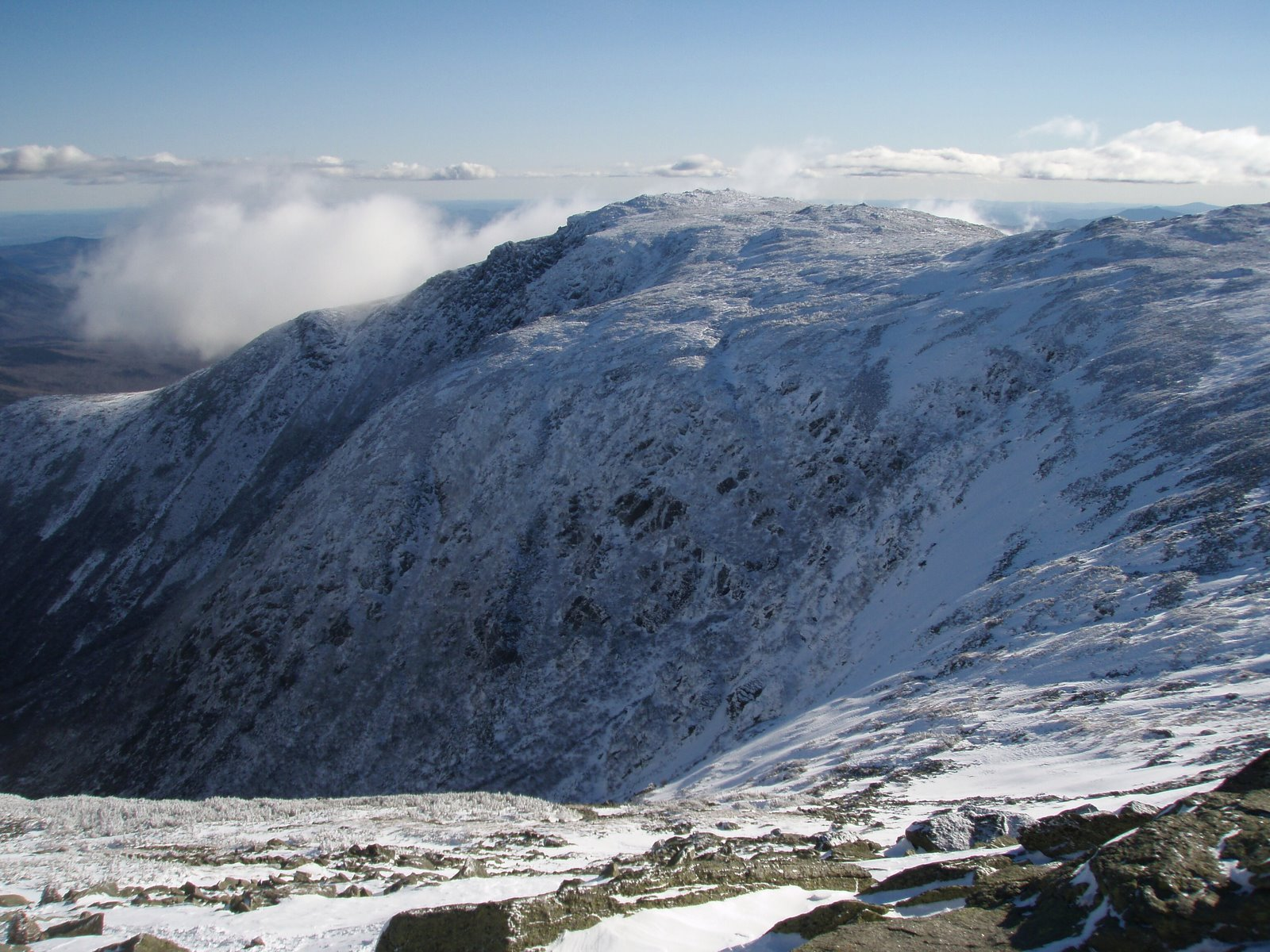
- Boott Spur rising above Tuckerman Ravine in late fall.

Highest point
- Elevation: 5,492 ft (1,674 m)
- Prominence: 92 ft (28 m)
- Parent peak: Mount Washington
- Coordinates: 44°15′8″N 071°17′42″W

Geography
- Location: Sargent's Purchase, New Hampshire, U.S.
- Parent range: Presidential Range
- Topo map: USGS Mount Washington

Climbing
- Easiest route: Hike via Boott Spur Trail

Boott Spur is a minor peak located in Coos County, New Hampshire, United States. The mountain is named after Francis Boott (1792–1863), and is part of the Presidential Range of the White Mountains. Boott Spur stands on the shoulder of Mount Washington, above the south side of the headwall of Tuckerman Ravine.

Although well over 4,000 feet (1,220 m) above sea level in height, the Appalachian Mountain Club does not define Boott Spur as a "four-thousand footer" because it stands less than 200 feet (60 m) above the col on the ridge from Washington, making it a secondary summit of that peak.

== Trails ==
The Boott Spur Trail ascends the summit from the east, leaving the Tuckerman Ravine Trail .4 miles (0.6 km) above the Pinkham Notch visitors' center, and ascends, first through woods and scrub, and then in the open above treeline, providing excellent views. The trail ultimately ends at the Davis Path 3.4 miles (5.5 km) from the Pinkham Notch visitors' center. The Davis Path, originally built in 1844-5 as an alternative to the more northerly Crawford Path, is a 14-mile (23 km) route from U.S. Route 302 in Crawford Notch up Montalban Ridge, over Boott Spur to the summit of Mount Washington.

The Glen Boulder Trail climbs Boott Spur from the southeast, starting at the Glen Ellis Falls parking area on New Hampshire Route 16. The trail ascends past the Glen Boulder and over the 4,806-foot (1,465 m) minor summit of Gulf Peak (also known as Slide Peak), then joins the Davis Path south of the summit of Boott Spur. Gulf Peak forms the south headwall of the Gulf of Slides and is a popular destination for extreme hiking in the area.

== Climate ==
There is no weather station, but this climate table contains interpolated data. Boott Spur has a subarctic climate (Köppen Dfc).

Climate data for Boott Spur 44.2561 N, 71.3024 W, Elevation: 5,233 ft (1,595 m) (1991–2020 normals)
Month	Jan	Feb	Mar	Apr	May	Jun	Jul	Aug	Sep	Oct	Nov	Dec	Year
Mean daily maximum °F (°C)	15.6 (−9.1)	16.4 (−8.7)	22.5 (−5.3)	32.9 (0.5)	46.1 (7.8)	54.1 (12.3)	58.9 (14.9)	57.4 (14.1)	51.9 (11.1)	40.0 (4.4)	29.3 (−1.5)	21.3 (−5.9)	37.2 (2.9)
Daily mean °F (°C)	7.7 (−13.5)	8.3 (−13.2)	15.0 (−9.4)	26.4 (−3.1)	40.2 (4.6)	49.3 (9.6)	54.4 (12.4)	52.9 (11.6)	46.7 (8.2)	34.3 (1.3)	23.0 (−5.0)	13.7 (−10.2)	31.0 (−0.6)
Mean daily minimum °F (°C)	−0.2 (−17.9)	0.2 (−17.7)	7.4 (−13.7)	19.9 (−6.7)	34.3 (1.3)	44.5 (6.9)	50.0 (10.0)	48.3 (9.1)	41.5 (5.3)	28.6 (−1.9)	16.6 (−8.6)	6.1 (−14.4)	24.8 (−4.0)
Average precipitation inches (mm)	5.45 (138)	5.26 (134)	6.59 (167)	7.29 (185)	7.14 (181)	8.43 (214)	8.83 (224)	7.18 (182)	7.25 (184)	10.08 (256)	8.05 (204)	7.37 (187)	88.92 (2,256)
Source: PRISM Climate Group

Gulf Peak (Slide Peak) is a summit on the Glen Boulder trail before the trail joins with the Davis Path. Gulf Peak also has a subarctic climate (Köppen Dfc), but with warmer average temperatures due to its lower elevation.

Climate data for Gulf Peak (Slide Peak) 44.2433 N, 71.2936 W, Elevation: 4,692 ft (1,430 m) (1991–2020 normals)
Month	Jan	Feb	Mar	Apr	May	Jun	Jul	Aug	Sep	Oct	Nov	Dec	Year
Mean daily maximum °F (°C)	17.5 (−8.1)	18.8 (−7.3)	24.9 (−3.9)	35.9 (2.2)	49.0 (9.4)	57.1 (13.9)	61.9 (16.6)	60.4 (15.8)	54.9 (12.7)	42.8 (6.0)	31.3 (−0.4)	23.0 (−5.0)	39.8 (4.3)
Daily mean °F (°C)	9.7 (−12.4)	10.8 (−11.8)	17.2 (−8.2)	28.6 (−1.9)	42.2 (5.7)	51.3 (10.7)	56.3 (13.5)	54.8 (12.7)	48.7 (9.3)	36.5 (2.5)	24.9 (−3.9)	15.5 (−9.2)	33.0 (0.6)
Mean daily minimum °F (°C)	1.9 (−16.7)	2.7 (−16.3)	9.4 (−12.6)	21.3 (−5.9)	35.4 (1.9)	45.4 (7.4)	50.7 (10.4)	49.2 (9.6)	42.4 (5.8)	30.2 (−1.0)	18.6 (−7.4)	8.0 (−13.3)	26.3 (−3.2)
Average precipitation inches (mm)	5.32 (135)	4.97 (126)	6.13 (156)	6.94 (176)	6.71 (170)	7.81 (198)	8.04 (204)	6.65 (169)	6.66 (169)	9.51 (242)	7.52 (191)	6.98 (177)	83.24 (2,113)
Source: PRISM Climate Group

== See also ==
- List of mountains in New Hampshire
- White Mountain National Forest
