= Bierstadt (disambiguation) =

Bierstadt is a borough in Wiesbaden, Hesse, Germany. Bierstadt may also refer to:

- Albert Bierstadt (1830–1902), American painter
- Charles Bierstadt (1819–1903), American photographer, brother of Albert
- Edward Bierstadt, (1824–1906), American photographer and engraver, brother of Albert
- Mount Bierstadt, a mountain in Colorado
- Bierstadt (font), a sans-serif typeface font developed by Steve Matteson in 2019
