= Glen House =

Coordinates: 44°17′20″N 71°13′27″W

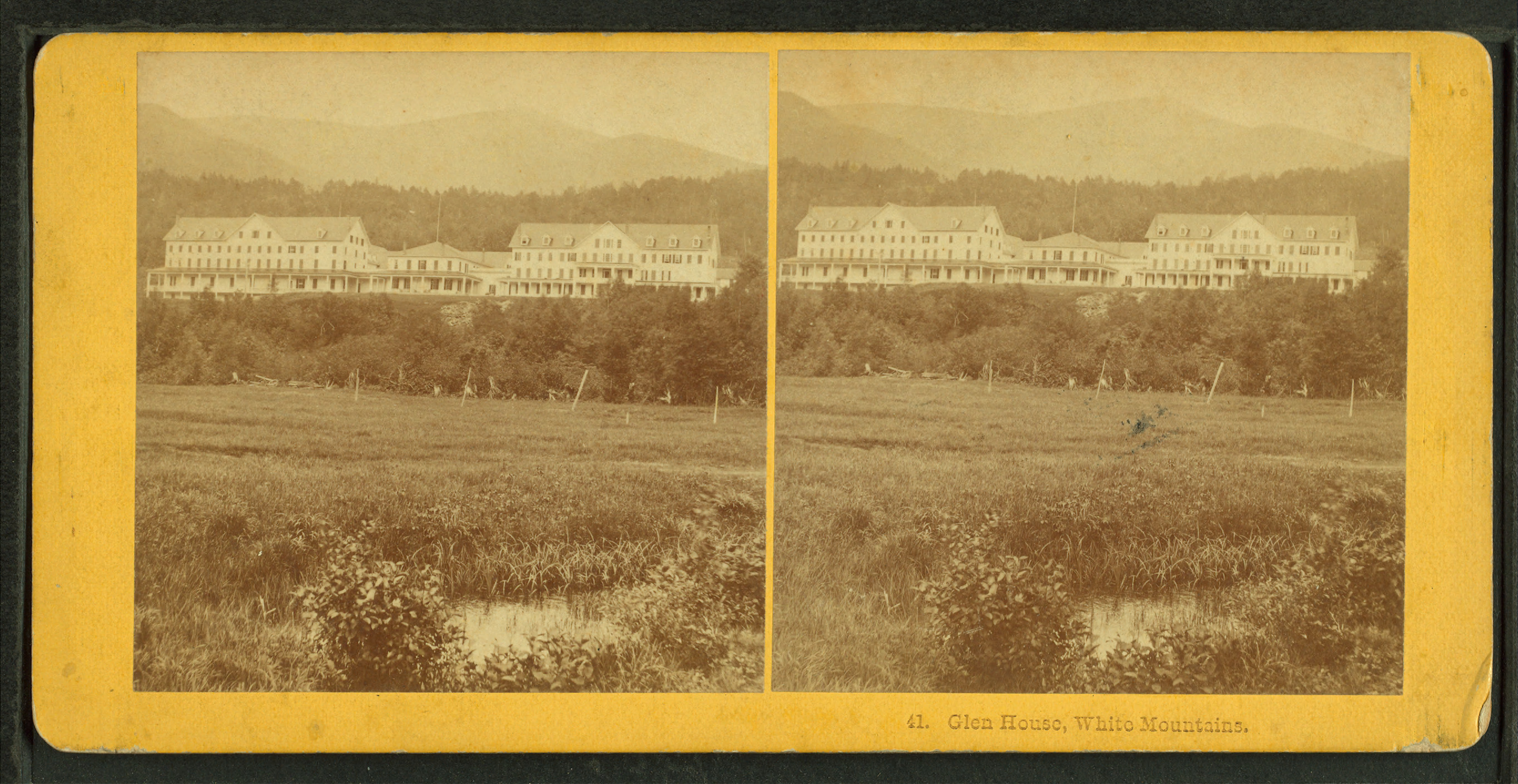
Glen House in a stereoscopic photograph by the Kilburn Brothers

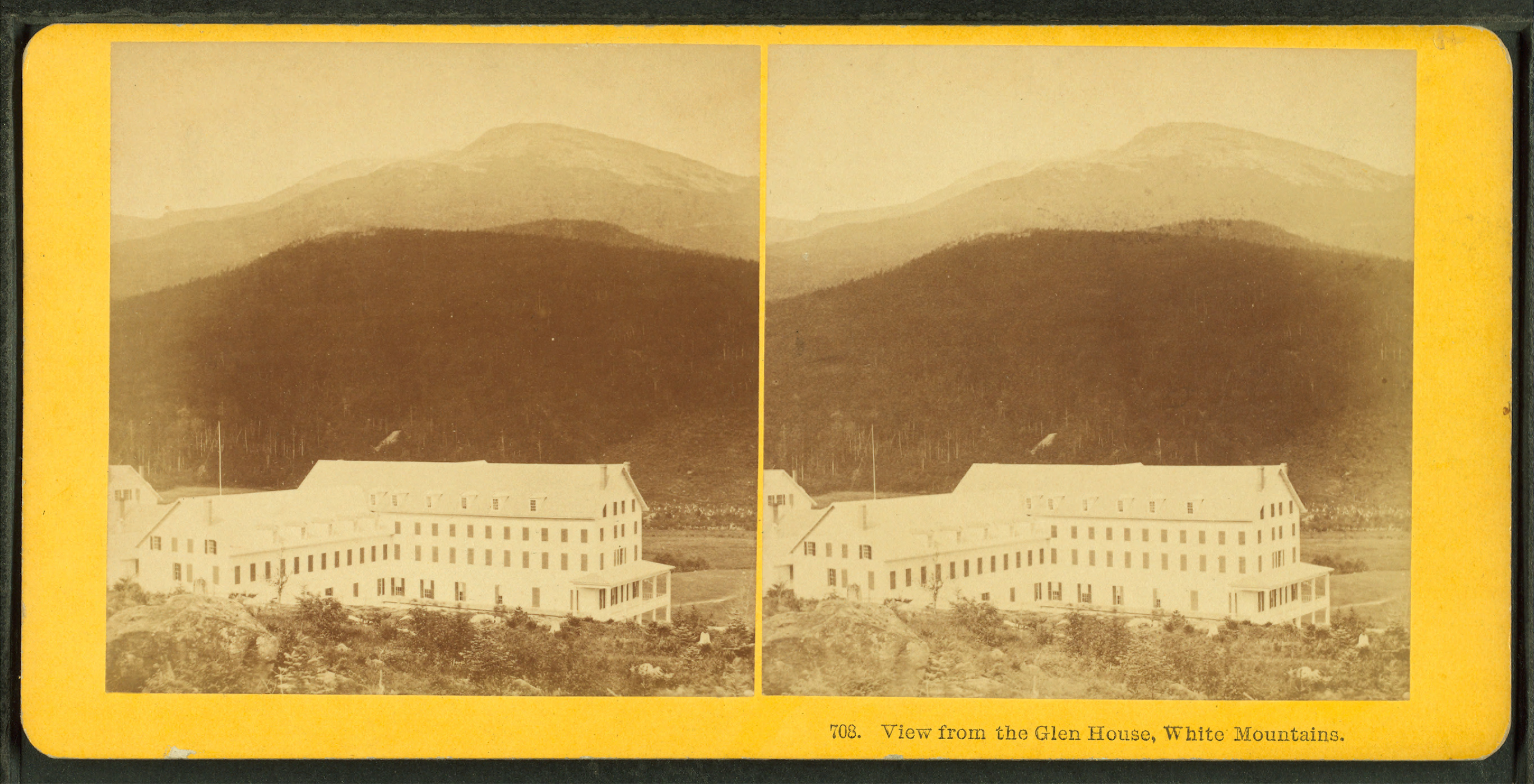

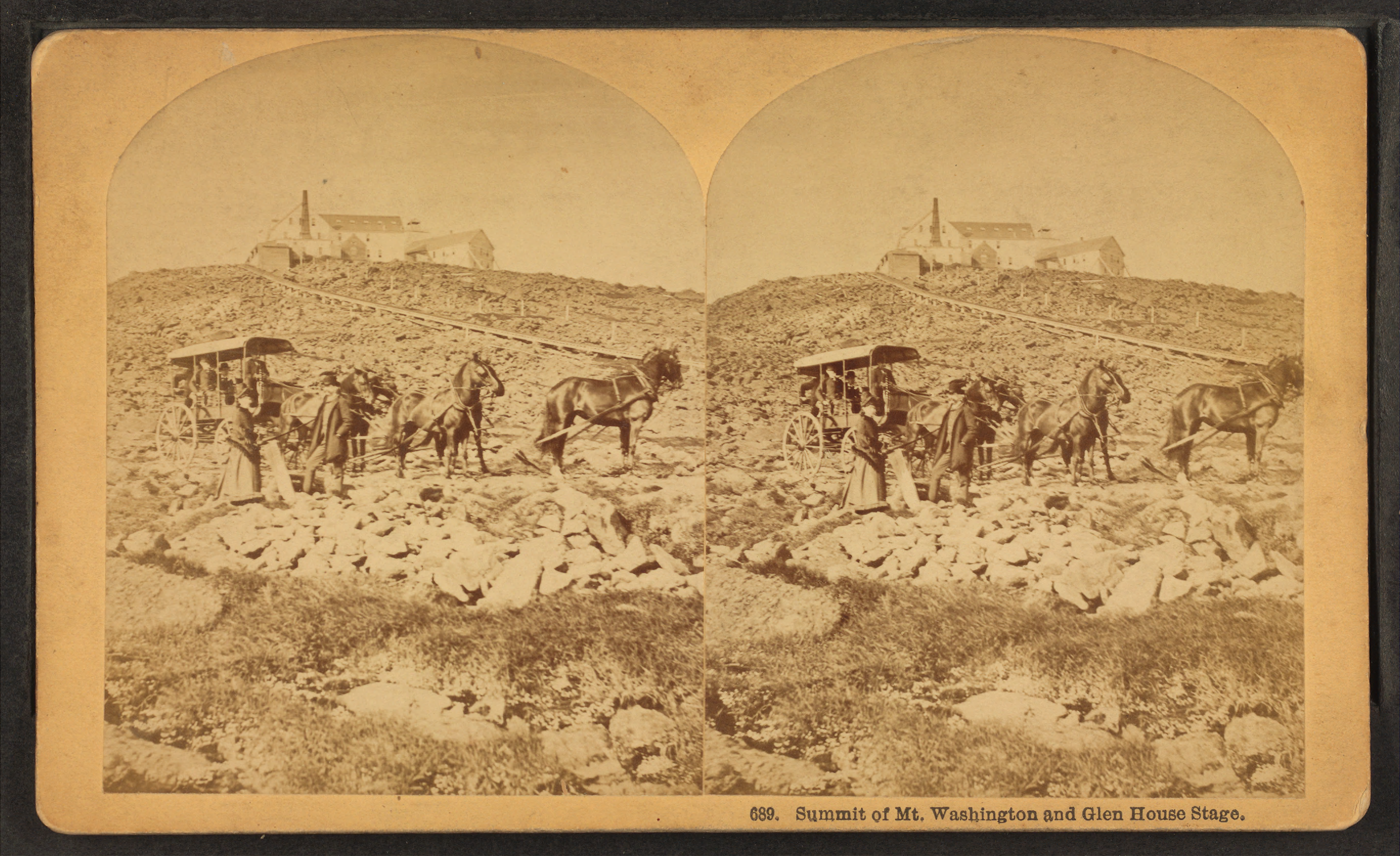
Stereoscopic photograph of the summit of Mount Washington and the Glen House stage coach by Kilburn Brothers circa 1872. The cog railway line is visible in the background, along with the Summit House atop the peak

Glen House is the name of a series of grand resorts and hotels, dating back to 1852, in Pinkham Notch very near Mount Washington in the White Mountains of New Hampshire, USA.

== History ==
The completion of the Grand Trunk Railway in 1851 established a route from Portland, Maine, to Gorham, New Hampshire, and brought increased visitors to the area. John Bellows converted a farmhouse into a hotel the same year and then sold it in April 1852 to J. M. Thompson, who renamed it the Glen House and finished work on its rooms. Expanded by 1866, the grand hotel featured views of Mount Washington, Tuckerman Ravine, and the northern Presidential Range. Guests could visit Mount Washington on the newly opened Carriage Road (now the Mount Washington Auto Road) to its summit, visit other natural attractions in the area, or recreate in the hotel's game rooms, parlors, library, listen to an orchestra, dance, play lawn tennis, fish, play croquet, hike, horseback ride, enjoy a guided carriage ride, or take in a theater show. Guests included Albert Bierstadt, and the Bierstadt Brothers captured stereoscopic photographs of scenery in the area including a bear. John P. Soule, G. W. Woodward, Nathan W. Pease, and the Kilburn Brothers also captured stereoscopic images from the area, including mountain landscapes and other scenery as well as some of the grand hotel and its interior spaces. In 1869, Albert Bierstadt discovered hotel proprietor Col. Joseph Mariner Thompson's body down river from his sawmill following a heavy fall rainstorm. Ownership was then taken over by the Milliken brothers. This first Glen House was completely destroyed by a fire in 1884.

Rebuilt and expanded over the next few years, the second Glen House burned again in 1893 and was not rebuilt.

Property ownership was subsequently acquired by the Libby family of Gorham who converted the existing servant's quarters into the third Glen House, a 40-room hotel, that was also destroyed by fire in 1924.

In 1925, a smaller fourth Glen House was constructed, now serving winter sports enthusiasts as well as summer travelers. In March 1967, this hotel also caught fire and burned to the ground.

The fifth Glen House opened at the base of the Mount Washington Auto Road in September 2018.
