= Benjamin W. Kilburn =

American photographer (1827–1909)

Benjamin West Kilburn
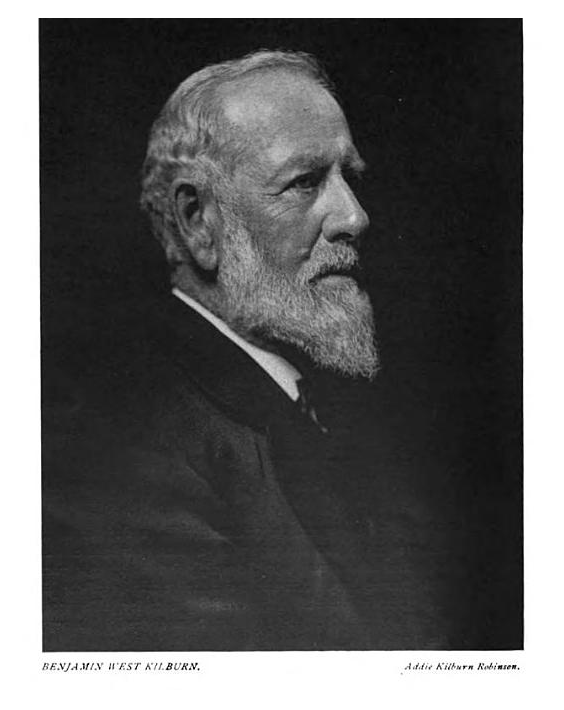
- Kilburn c. 1897
- Born: December 10, 1827; Littleton, New Hampshire
- Died: January 15, 1909 (aged 81); Littleton, New Hampshire
- Resting place: Glenwood Cemetery, Littleton, NH
- Occupation: Photographer
- Known for: "Old Man of the Mountain" (stereo-photograph of Cannon Mountain in Franconia Notch, White Mountains, New Hampshire)

Benjamin West Kilburn (December 10, 1827 – January 15, 1909) was an American photographer and stereoscopic view publisher famous for his landscape images of the nascent American and Canadian state, provincial, and national parks and his visual record of the great migrations at the end of the nineteenth century. Kilburn was a legislator in the New Hampshire General Court. A patent was granted for his gun-style camera.

== Early life ==
The son of Josiah Kilburn, an iron founder who manufactured Franconia stoves, Benjamin received his education as a machinist in Fall River, Massachusetts, at age 16. After four years, Benjamin returned to Littleton, New Hampshire, to become a partner with his father in the Josiah Kilburn & Son foundry.

During the Civil War, Kilburn was a sergeant in Company D, 13th New Hampshire Volunteer Infantry, and participated with his unit in the Battle of Fredericksburg, Virginia.

A mountaineer, Kilburn was active on Mount Washington in New Hampshire; in Ouray, Colorado; and in the Sierra Nevada of California, including Yosemite in 1872.

== Photography ==
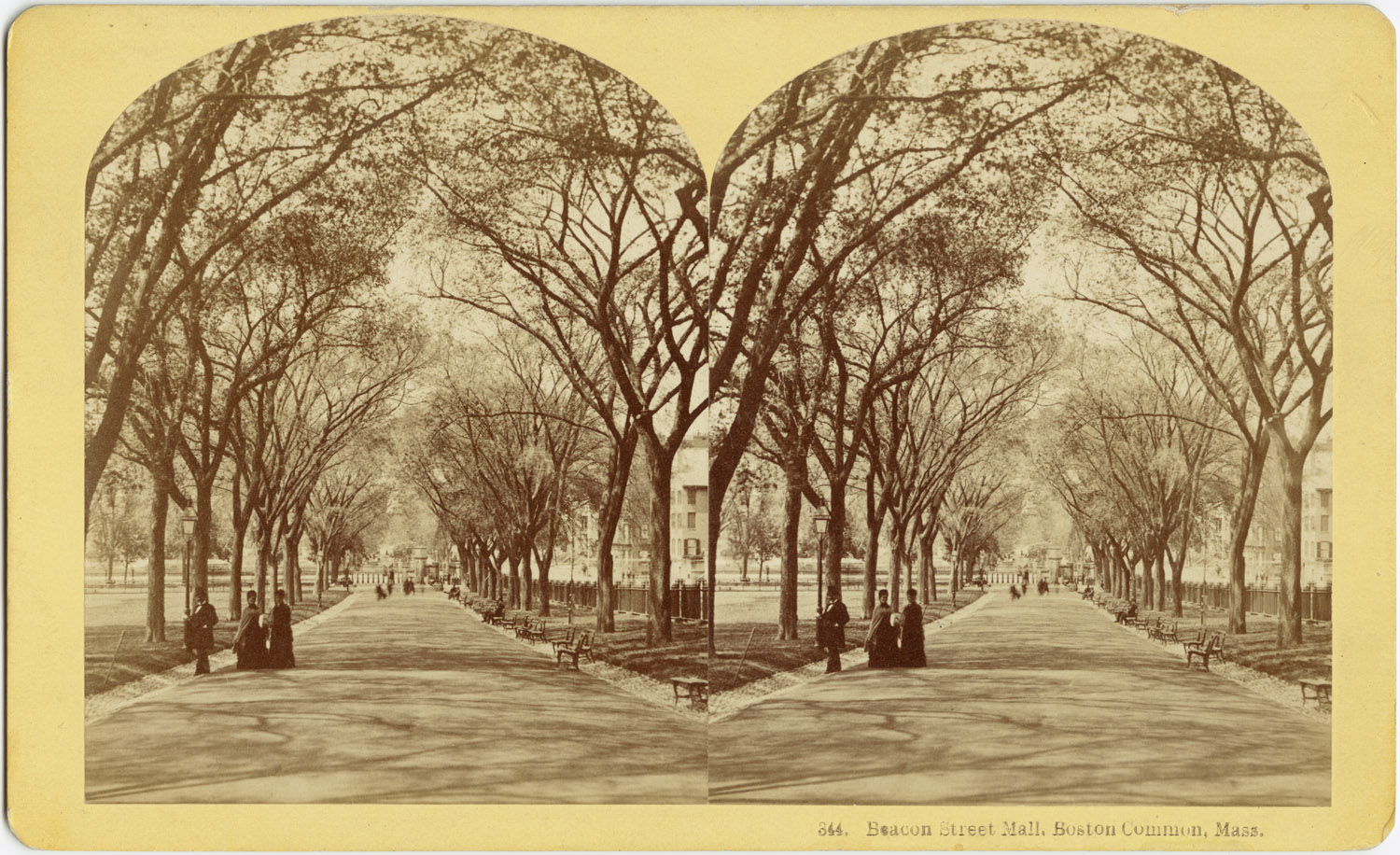
Stereograph of Boston Common by B.W. Kilburn

Kilburn Brothers stereoviews date from about 1865. Published sources attribute their stereographs (stereo-photographs) before 1876 solely to Benjamin. His brother, Edward Kilburn (February 27, 1830 – 1884), however, learned the art of photography from a local daguerreotypist, Ora C. Bolton, from neighboring Waterford, Vermont, at an earlier date.

Photographer O. C. Bolton also taught Franklin G. Weller of Littleton, New Hampshire. Weller became a notable stereo-photographer who would introduce comic views of a special local color and pioneer a popular line which appeared in later Kilburn subject categories. Bolton was connected with another early stereo-photographer, Franklin L. White of Lancaster, New Hampshire, who published a view list of glass stereographs in 1859.

Early period Kilburn stereoviews were sold by Joseph L. Bates, a retail outlet which specialized in Oliver Wendell Holmes stereo-viewers at his location on Washington Street, Boston. A Kilburn-Bates stereoview catalog was published about 1867. The Kilburn list reflected choices similar to those of Franklin L. White. Bates commercial support gave Kilburn Brothers their first significant push in the marketplace.

== Kilburn Brothers and B. W. Kilburn & Co. ==
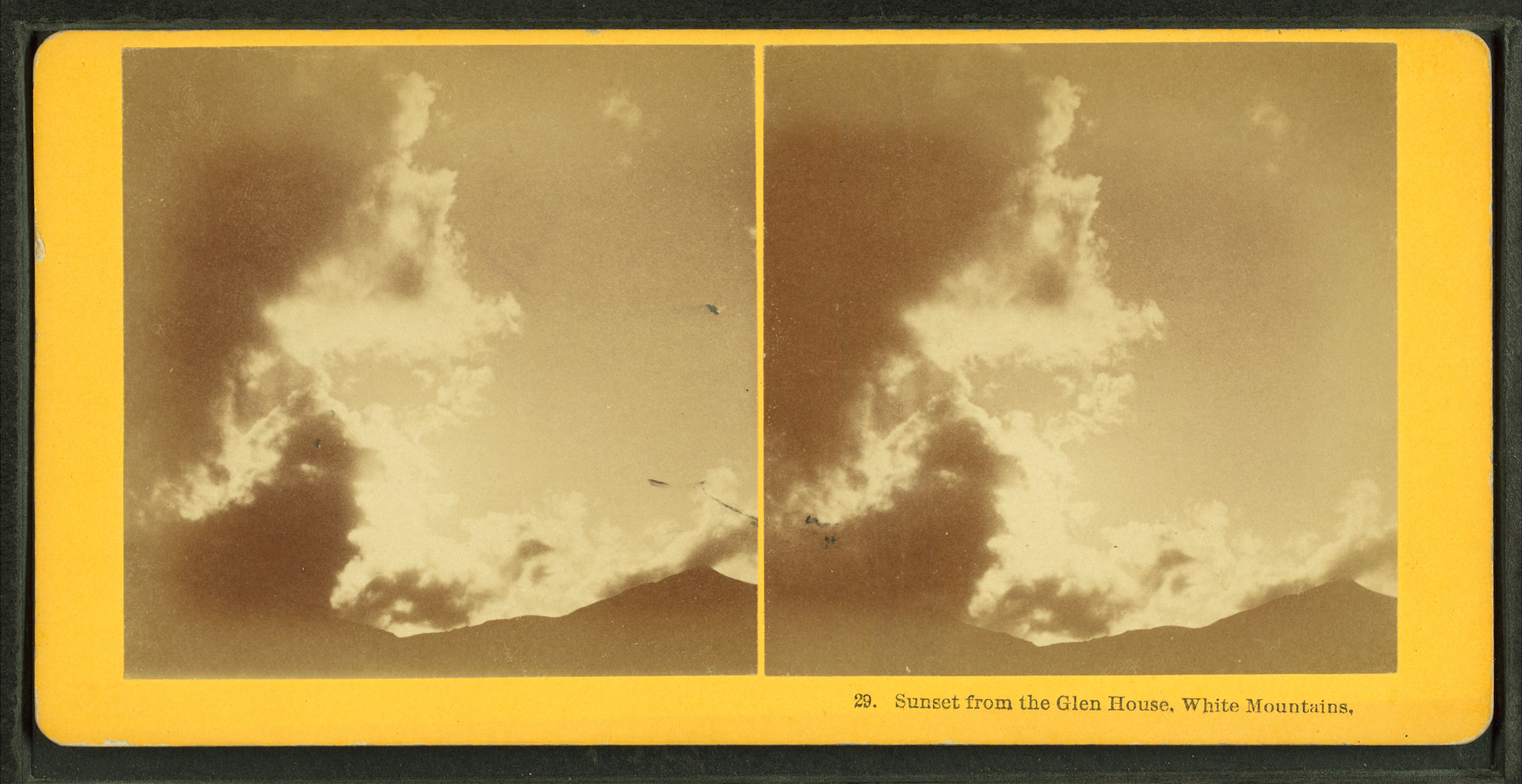
Sunset from the Glen House in the White Mountains of New Hampshire, one of several stereoscopic images Kilburn Brothers produced from the area near Mount Washington (New Hampshire)

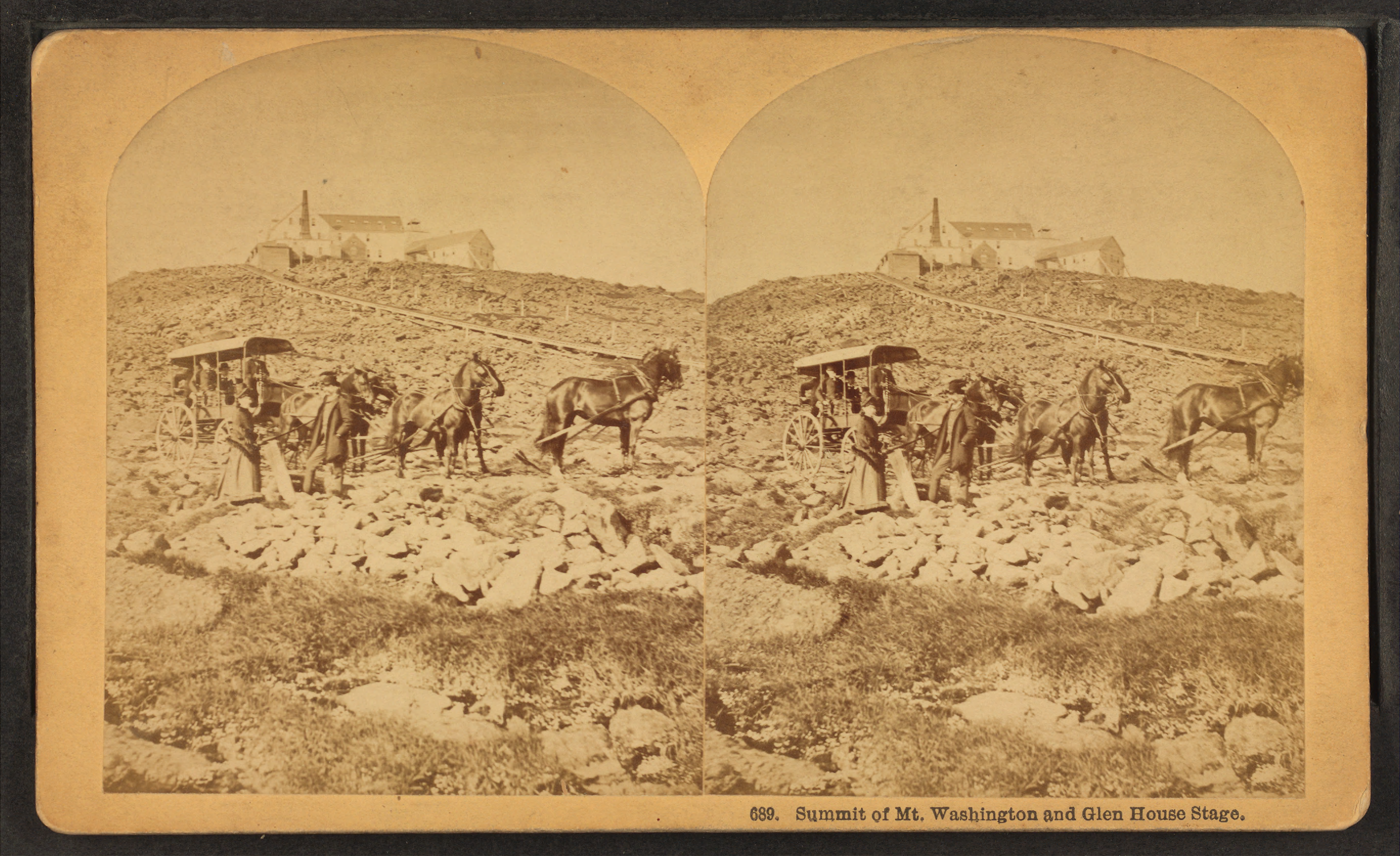
Stereoscopic photograph of the summit of Mount Washington (New Hampshire) and the Glen House stage coach by Kilburn Brothers circa 1872. The cog railway line also appears to be visible in the background along with the Summit House atop the peak

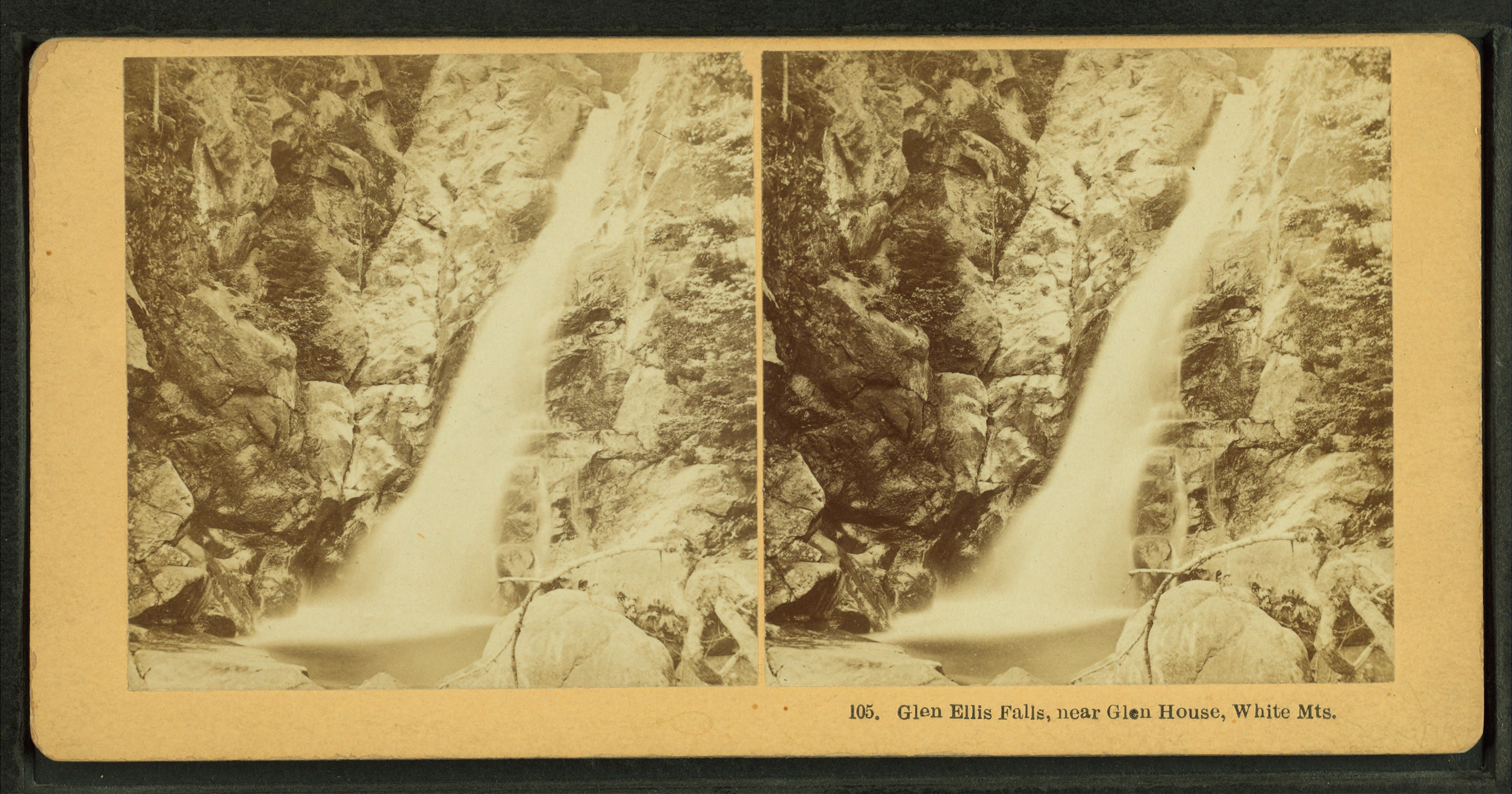
Glen Ellis Falls on the Ellis River near Glen House

Their first stereoscopic views were produced in Edward Kilburn's studio in the McCoy Block in Littleton. The location proved to be too small for their popularity. The business remained family-centered and was largely focused on local subjects and talent. Benjamin's daughter Elizabeth and her husband William Jackson were employees who helped to develop the quality product associated with Kilburn views.

By 1868, a second larger viewshop was built at the Chutter Block location on Main Street. Afterwards, a new factory was built on Cottage Street with more room to expand. Both of these larger viewshops were but one block from the Littleton railroad station. Young salesmen carried Kilburn views onto the trains and south to an ever-expanding audience. Today the site of the third viewshop is a state historic landmark. They quickly became the world's most extensive manufacturer of stereoscopic views.

Edward Kilburn retired from the partnership about 1877, although the product continued to be identified as Kilburn Brothers until the late 1880s. John P. Soule, a famous stereo-photographer from Washington Street in Boston, was closely associated with the Kilburn Brothers. A significant number of his negatives were shipped to the Kilburn business of Littleton in 1881. Benjamin was active in the National Photographic Association.

The new B. W. Kilburn & Company brought many changes in stereoscopic technology and audience. By 1890, Benjamin's second son-in-law, the attorney Daniel Clark Remich, had joined the board of the firm, as well as James M. Davis, agent for a growing army of door-to-door salesmen. Davis would in later years direct the day-to-day decisions of the firm. As general manager, located first in Philadelphia and later in New York and St. Louis, he used his cable address "Artistic" to direct production, send photographers to distant lands, and hire a sales force to distribute the views.

The Columbian Exposition at Chicago in 1893 became the high-water mark for their business as they acquired exclusive rights to sell stereoscopic views of the World's Fair.

The business was succeeded by several of its former salesmen and competitors including: W. F. Burns & Co. of St. Louis in 1910; Underwood & Underwood brothers of New York; B. L. Singley of the Keystone View Company; and others.

== Legacy ==
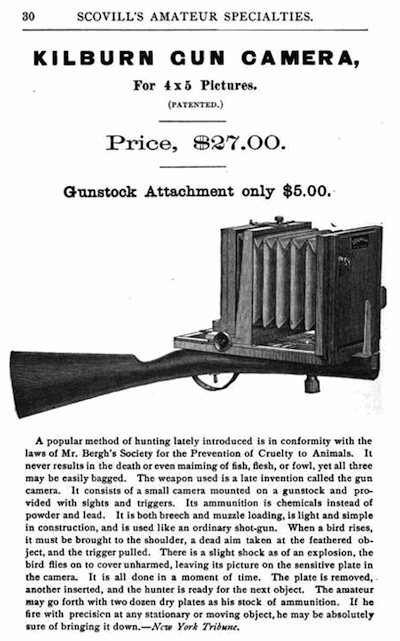
Kilburn Gun Camera

Benjamin W. Kilburn is remembered both as a visual historian of immigration and international tourism and as the world's most extensive manufacturer of stereoscopic views from 1865 to 1910. He became a pioneer of photojournalism documenting the presidential inauguration of Grover Cleveland, the Johnstown Flood in Pennsylvania, the Boer War, the Boxer Rebellion, and the Spanish–American War, among other events. He also is credited with invention of a photo gun camera, which was manufactured by Scovill Mfg. Co. from 1882 to 1886, to circumvent the tripod usage while taking pictures among the White Mountains, New Hampshire.

Civic-minded citizen, American Civil War veteran and supporter of the Grand Army of the Republic, he developed an early fire-fighting apparatus, and was involved in search and rescue on Mount Washington.

== See also ==
- New Hampshire historical marker no. 71: Kilburn Brothers Stereoscopic View Factory
