= Underwood & Underwood =

Stereoscopic image producer and distributor

Underwood & Underwood was a producer and distributor of stereoscopic and other photographic images, and later was a pioneer in the field of news bureau photography.

== History ==
The company was founded in 1881 in Ottawa, Kansas, by two brothers, Elmer Underwood (born Fulton County, Illinois 1859 - died St. Petersburg, Florida 1947) and Bert Elias Underwood (born in Oxford, Illinois 1862 - died Tucson, Arizona 1943). They moved to Baltimore and then to New York City in 1891.

=== Stereographic photographs ===
At one time, Underwood & Underwood was the largest publisher of stereoviews (also known as stereographs or stereoscopic cards), in the world, producing 10 million views a year. The Underwood brothers developed a selling system of thorough canvassing using college students. They distributed stereographs for Charles Bierstadt, J.F. Jarvis and the Littleton View Company. By 1887, they had outgrown their original office in Ottawa and had moved to New York City. Offices were also opened in Canada and Europe, establishing an outlet in London at 104 High Holborn.

In 1891, Bert learned how to operate a camera and thus the firm of Underwood & Underwood Publishing entered a new merchandising sphere. By 1897, the company had a number of full-time staff and freelance photographers. In the same year, the Underwoods purchased the businesses of Jarvis; Bierstadt; and, William H. Rau. Underwood & Underwood was publishing 25,000 stereographs a day by 1901. The firm still canvassed and sold its own stereographs. Around 1900, Underwood & Underwood introduced boxed sets, with specific themes, such as education and religion, and travel sets depicting popular tourist areas of the world.

Altogether Underwood & Underwood produced between 30,000 and 40,000 stereographic titles. In 1920 stereograph production was discontinued. Underwood & Underwood sold its stereographic stock and rights to the Keystone View Company in 1921. Images republished by Keystone included a V prefix for Underwood source. An example would indicate K24056 as Keystone numbered and the same images V24056 as Underwood and Keystone dual copyrighted.

=== Photojournalism ===
In second half of 1890s, the firm began licensing stereoscopic images of newsworthy events to newspapers and magazines. Bert Underwood's images of the 1897 Greco-Turkish War marked its first foray into press photography. The studio also published photo sets of the Second Boer War in 1900, which were republished in Leslie's Weekly.

By 1910, Underwood & Underwood had fully entered the field of news photography. Its coverage spanned sports, theatre, and lifestyle content. Individual photographers covered these areas for the firm: Thomas Sand photographed sports; George Kadel covered photojournalism and advertising. The company's news photography business continued into the 1940s.

Due to this expansion, stereograph production was reduced until the early years of World War I.

=== Portrait photography ===
Under the portraitist Jack Freulich, the New York office of Underwood & Underwood opened a portrait studio for celebrities and entertainment publicity. Universal Pictures contracted with Underwood and Underwood for studio stills and publicity in 1918. When Universal moved to California in 1920, it hired Freulich away.

=== Aerial photography ===
In 1924-25, Underwood & Underwood took the first vertically controlled aerial photographs of the new cities of Miami and Miami Beach. Approximately 400 images were taken showing the final phase of the first building boom, which collapsed shortly after when the Great Hurricane of 1926 destroyed both locations. The quality of the images was superb for the day and rivals modern aerials in detail due to the low altitude of the aircraft taking them. Little else is known about this aspect of the company's work.

The Underwood brothers retired in 1925, leaving the firm to C. Thomas Underwood, the son of Bert. The company ceased trading in the 1940s.

== Modern appreciation of early stereoviews ==
Stereoviews were meant to be viewed using a stereoscope, of which there were many types. However, advances in 3D technology have allowed old stereoviews to be reproduced on digital media or the print page to be viewed using paper glasses. Anaglyph 3D is the name given to the stereoscopic 3D effect achieved by means of encoding each eye's image using filters of different (usually chromatically opposite) colours, typically red and cyan. Anaglyph 3D images contain two differently filtered coloured images, one for each eye. When viewed through the "color-coded" "anaglyph glasses", each of the two images reaches the eye it's intended for, revealing an integrated stereoscopic image. The visual cortex of the brain fuses this into perception of a three-dimensional scene or composition.

== Collections ==
The Smithsonian Institution holds the Underwood & Underwood Glass Stereophonic Collection that includes some 28,000 glass plates, including stereoscopic negatives, negative and positive non-stereoscopic plates used to produce lantern slides and paper prints, paper stereographs, sales catalogues and 4 stereoscopes.

Work attributed to Underwood & Underwood is held in other permanent collections, a selection of which is listed below:

- The American University in Cairo
- Art Institute of Chicago
- Brigham Young University
- The British Museum
- Conway Library, The Courtauld Institute of Art, London
- Hudson River Museum, Yonkers, NY
- J. Paul Getty Museum, Los Angeles
- The Metropolitan Museum of Art, New York
- MoMA, New York
- National Portrait Gallery, London
- Department of Image Collections, National Gallery of Art Library, Washington D.C.
- Science Museum, London
- Victoria and Albert Museum, London

== Gallery ==
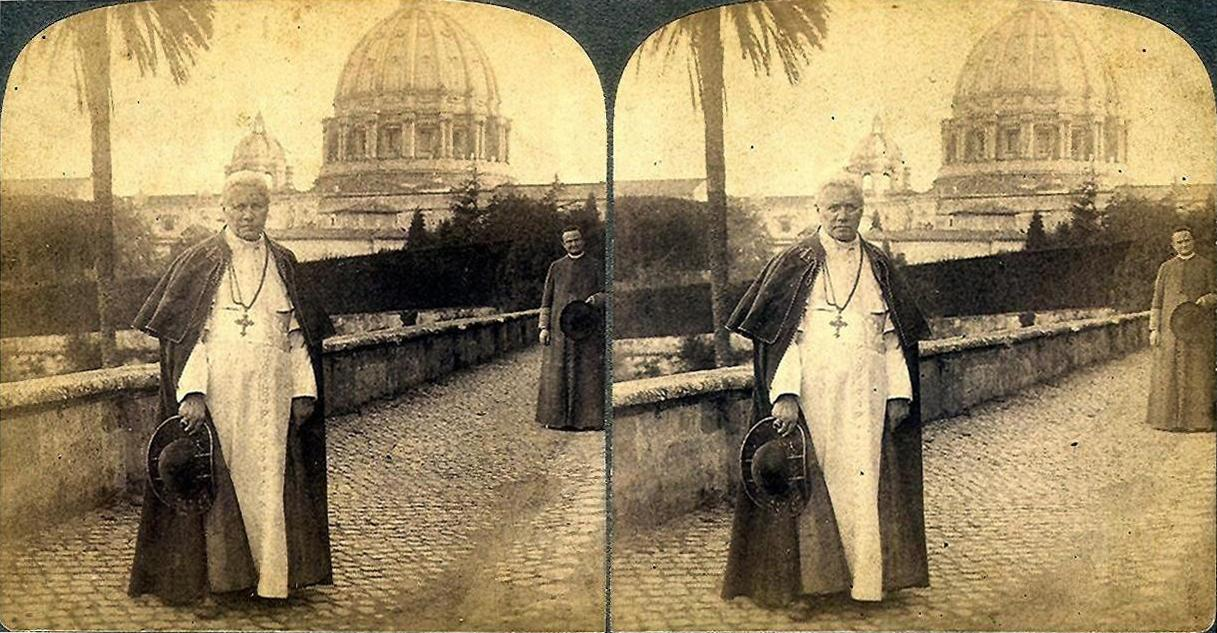
"His Holiness Pope Pius X, walking in the Vatican gardens - St. Peter's in the distance - Rome, Italy." 1905

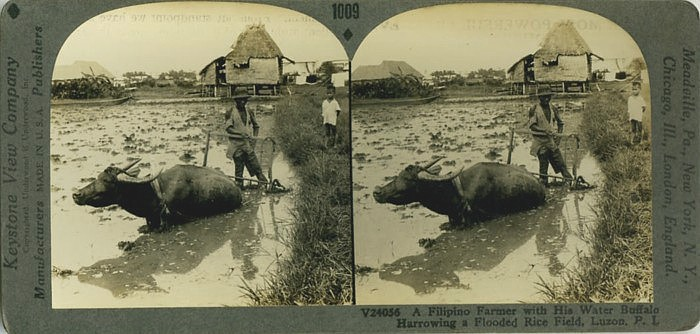
Underwood and Underwood Stereoscopic source image for the following anaglyph

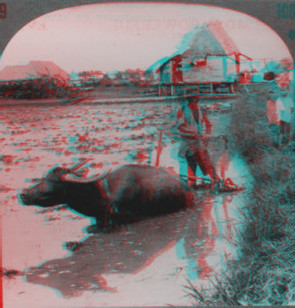
Stereo monochrome image anaglyphed for red (left eye) and cyan (right eye) filters. 3D red cyan glasses are recommended to view this image correctly.

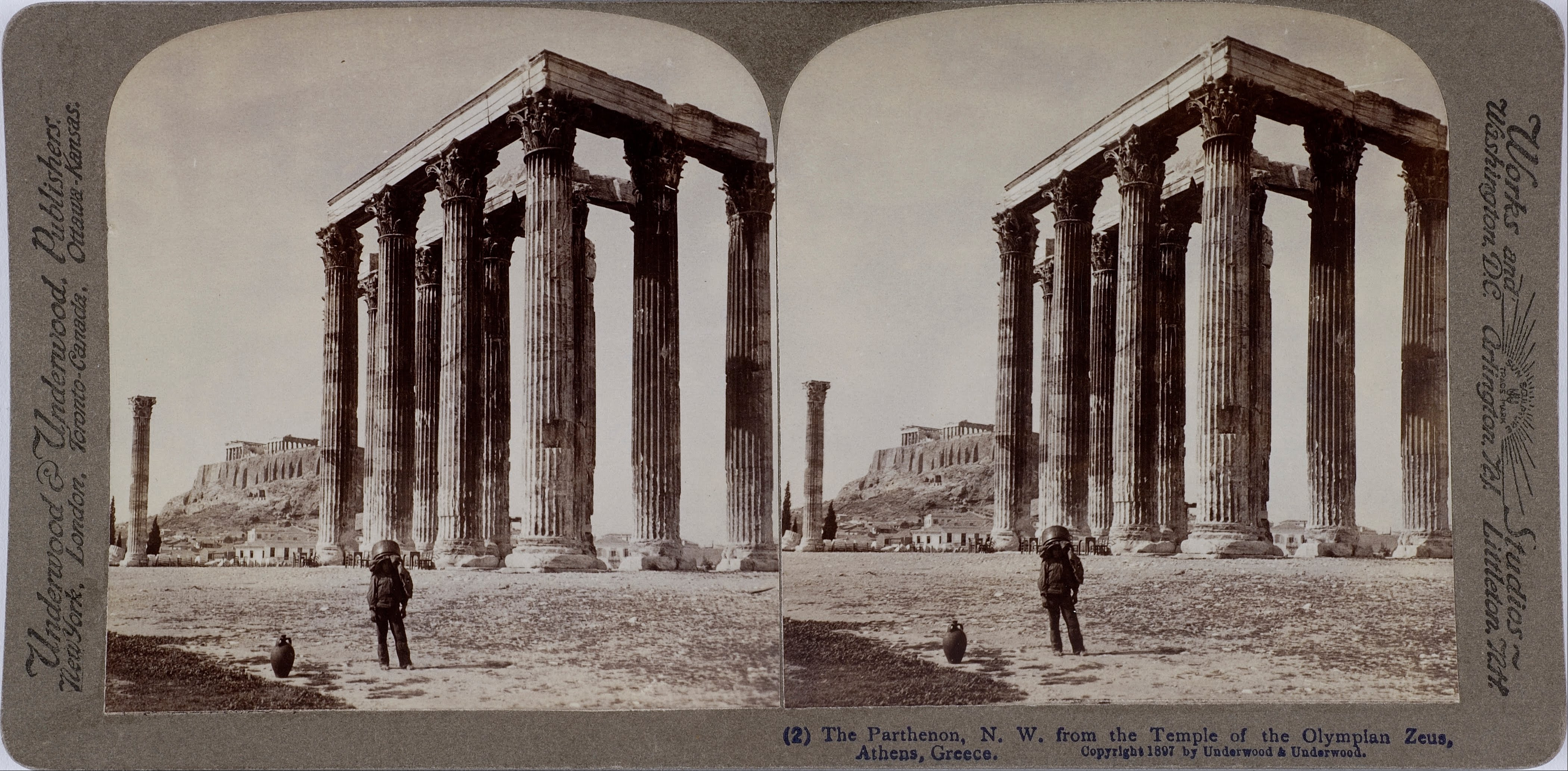
1897 View # 2 The Temple of Olympian Zeus and the Acropolis in the background

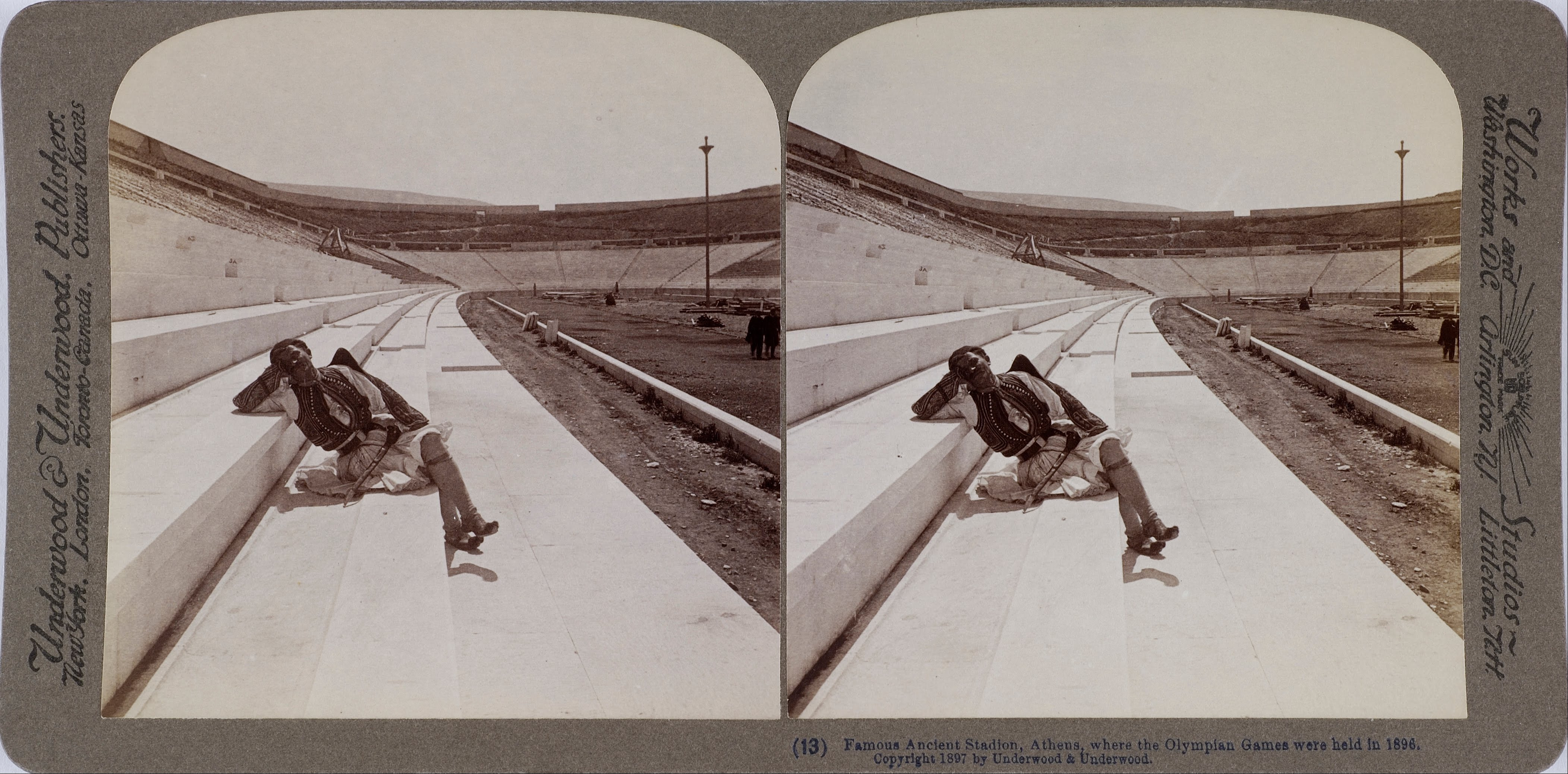
1897 View # 13 The Panathenaic Stadium

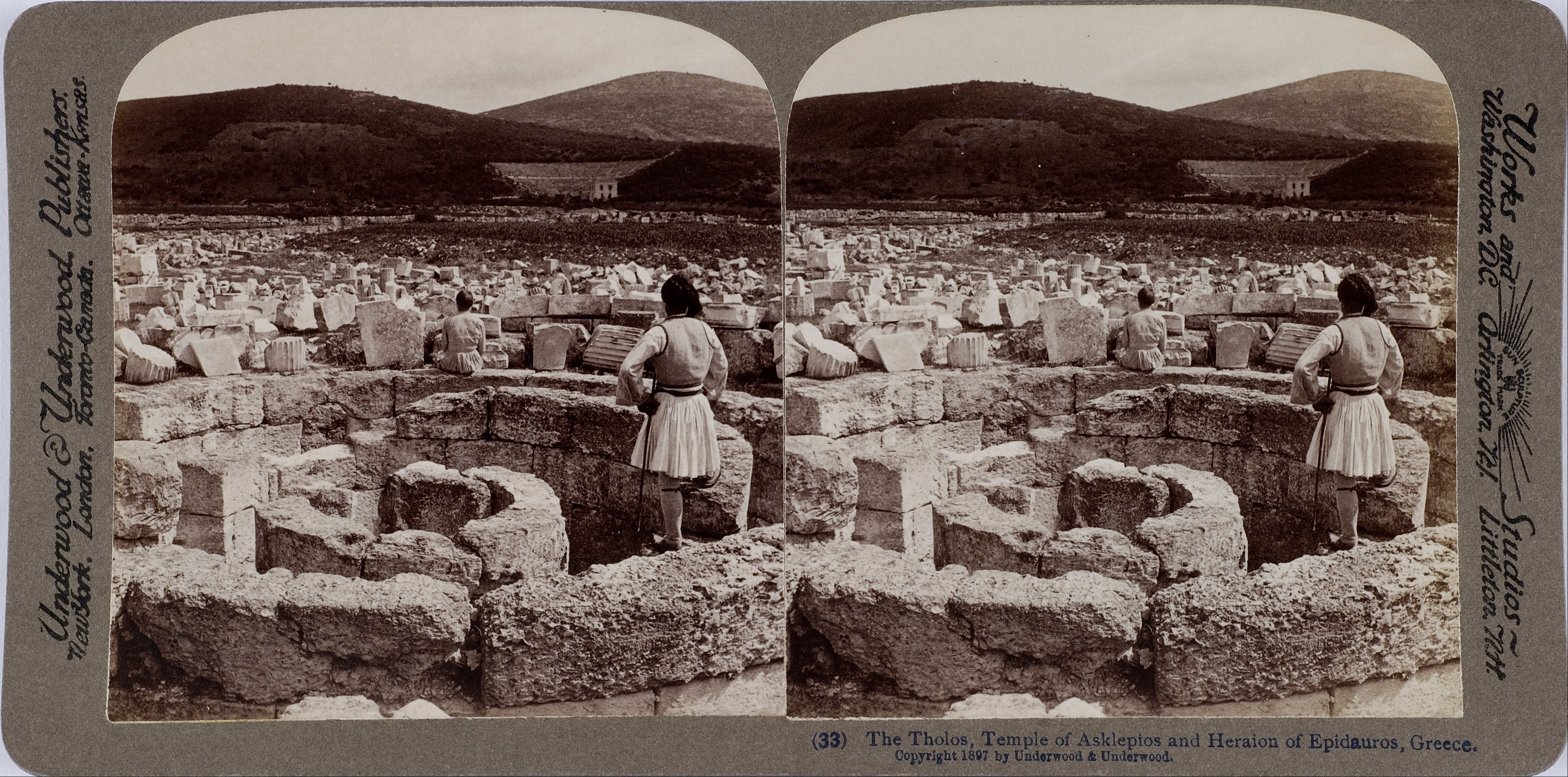
1897 View # 33 The archaeological site at Epidaurus

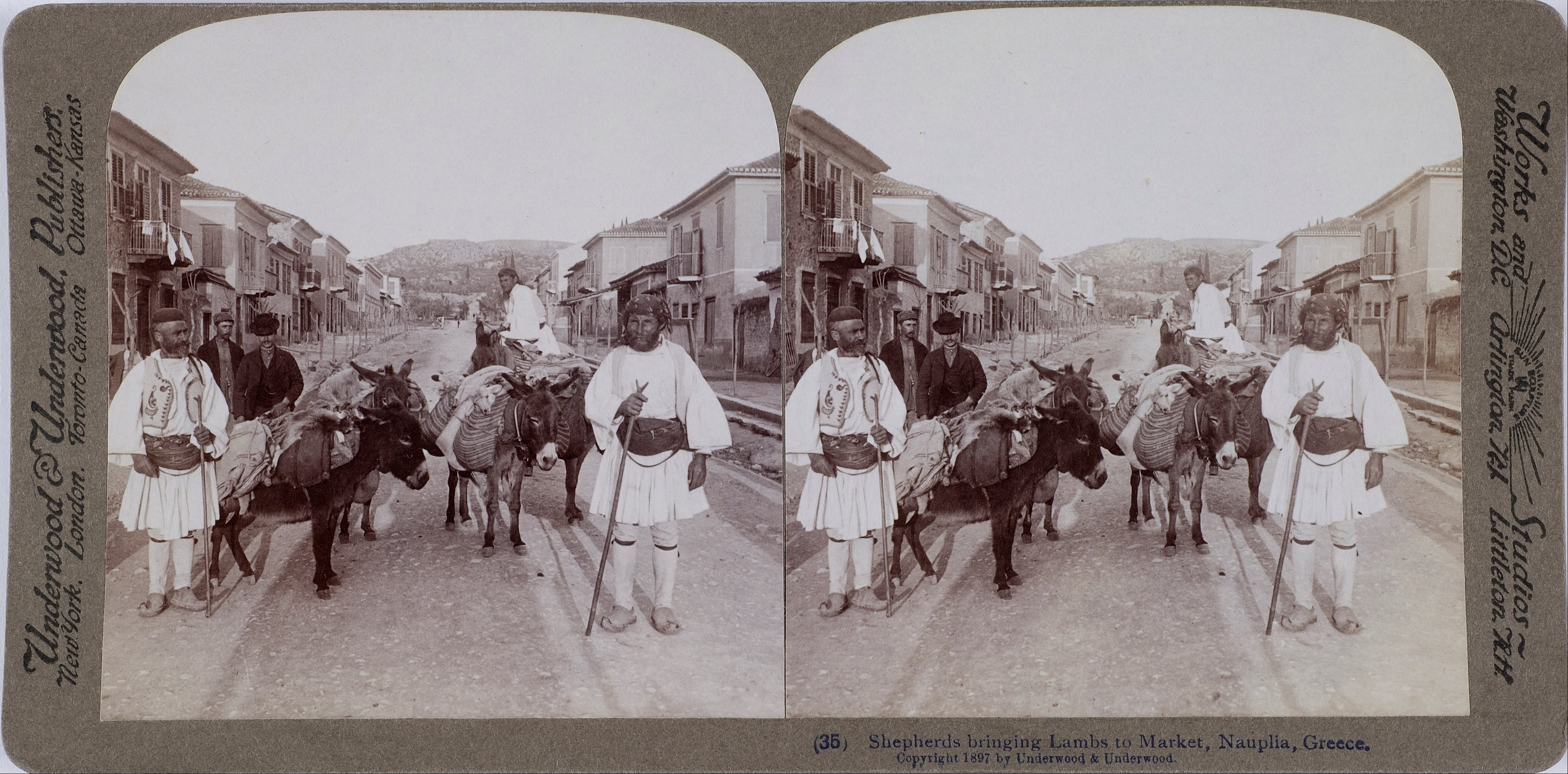
1897 View # 35 Shepherds leading sheep to the Nafplion Market

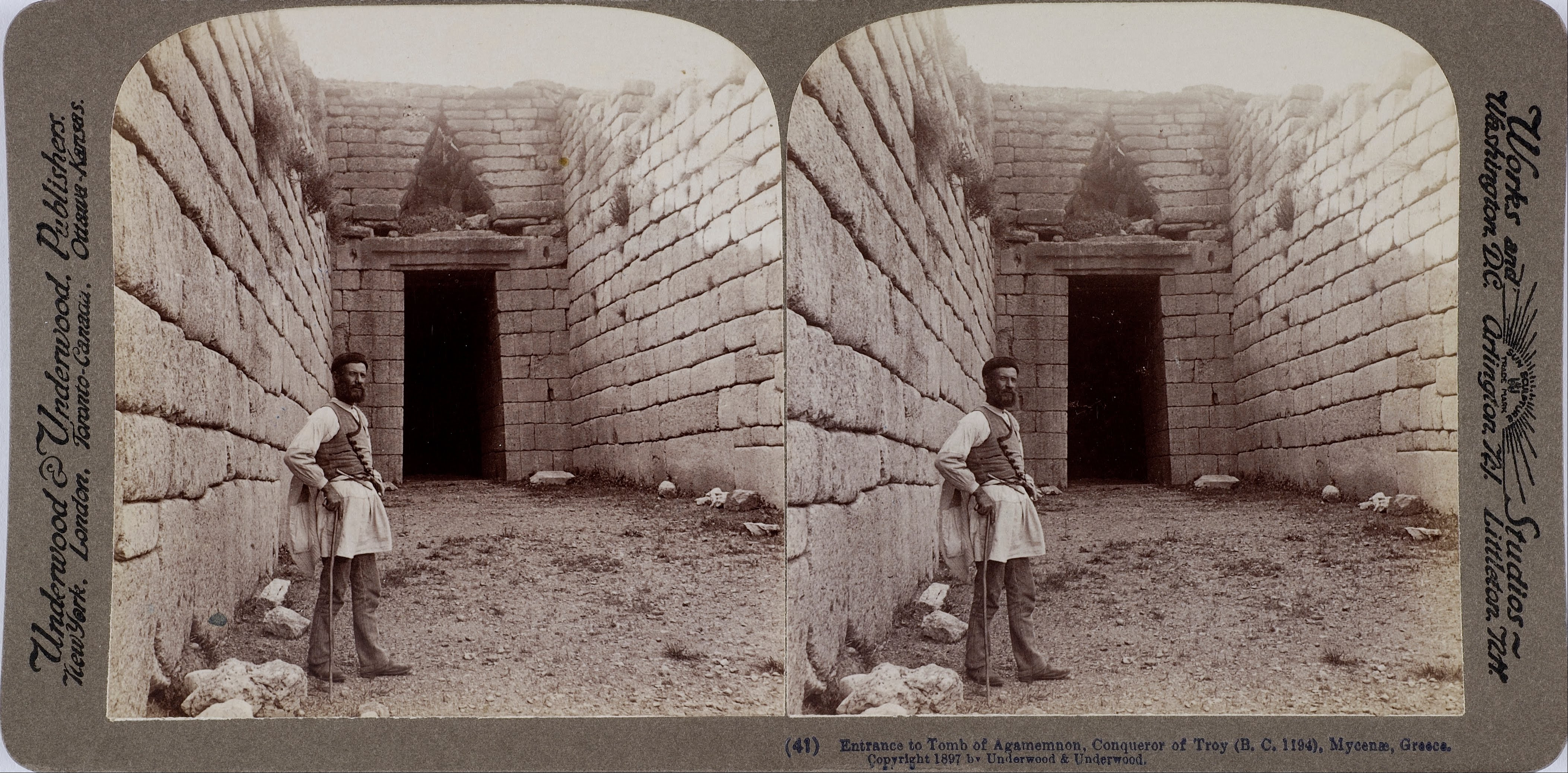
1897 View # 41 The Treasury of Atreus at Mycenae

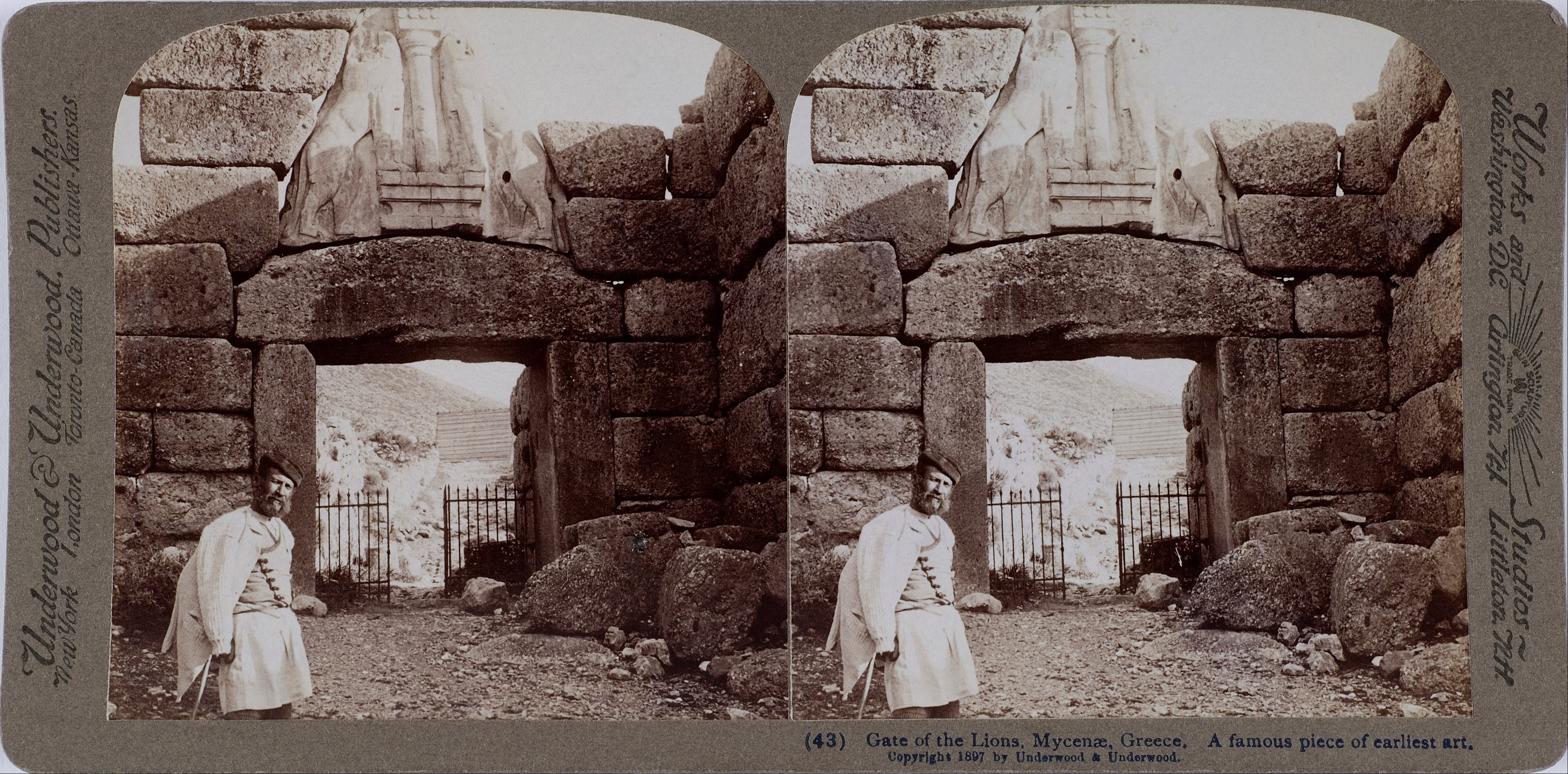
1897 View # 43 The Lion Gate at Mycenae

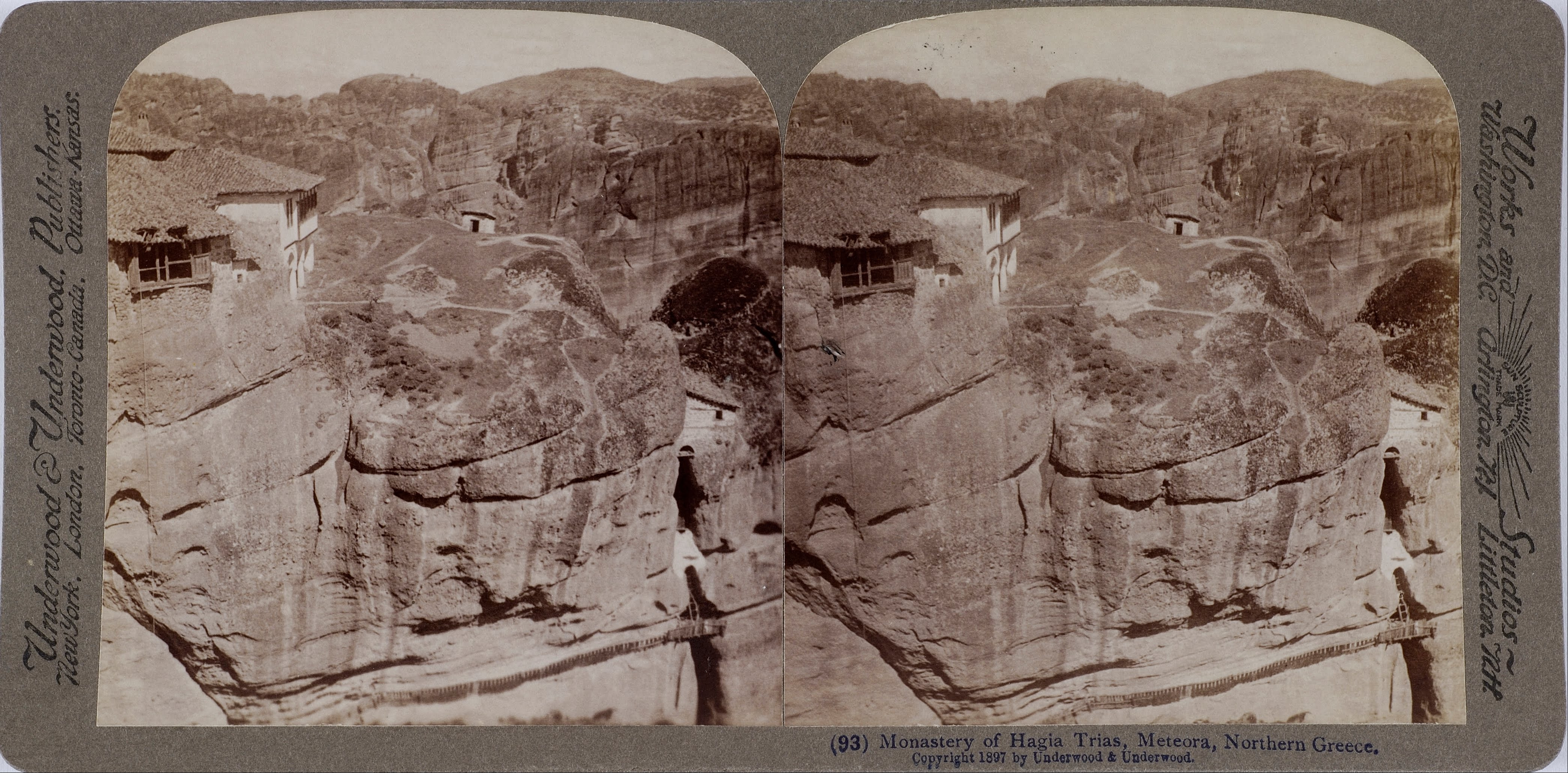
1897 View # 93 The Monastery of the Holy Trinity, Meteora

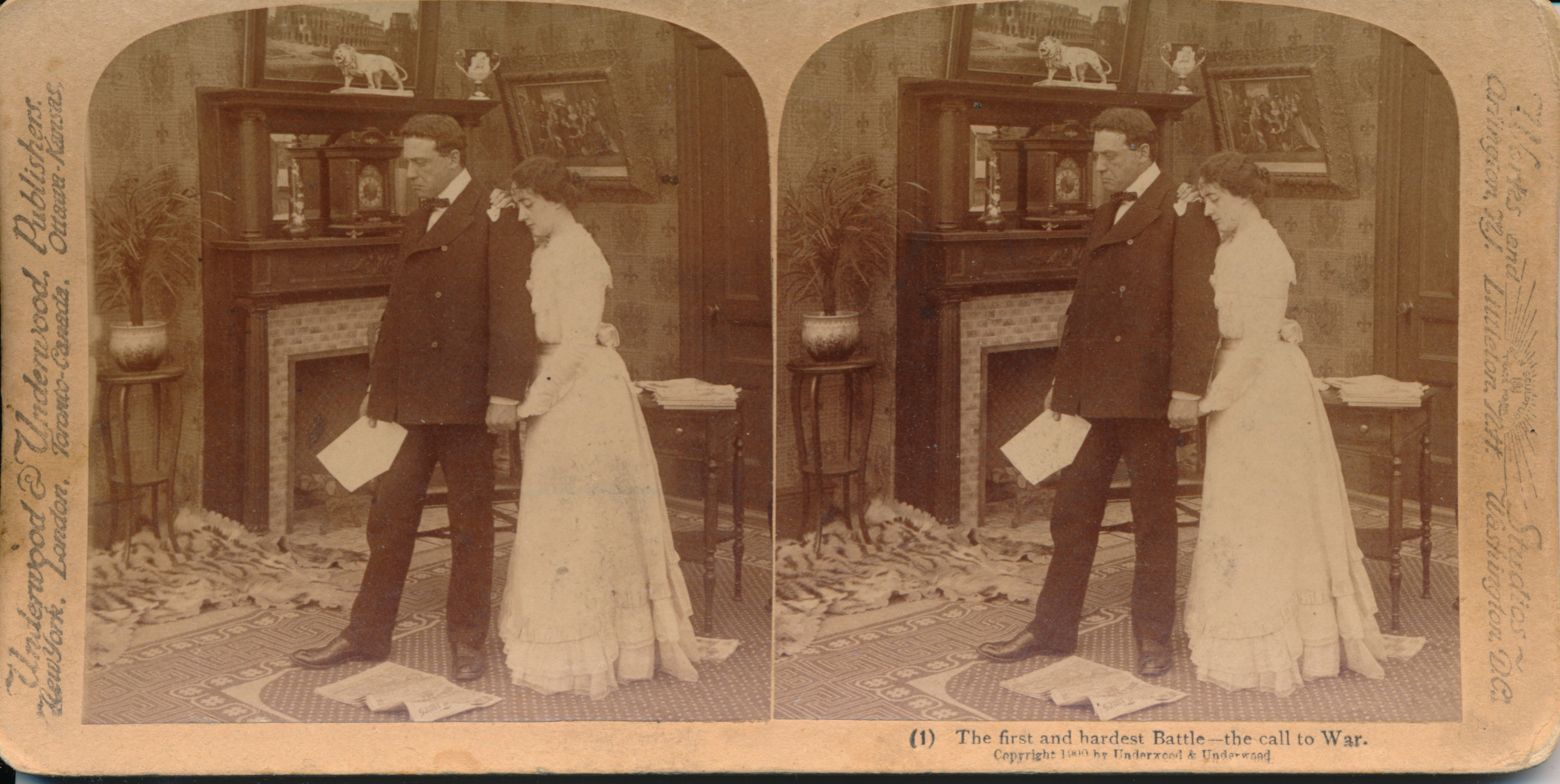
"The First and Hardest Battle-the call to War".{Called upon to Enlist} 1900.

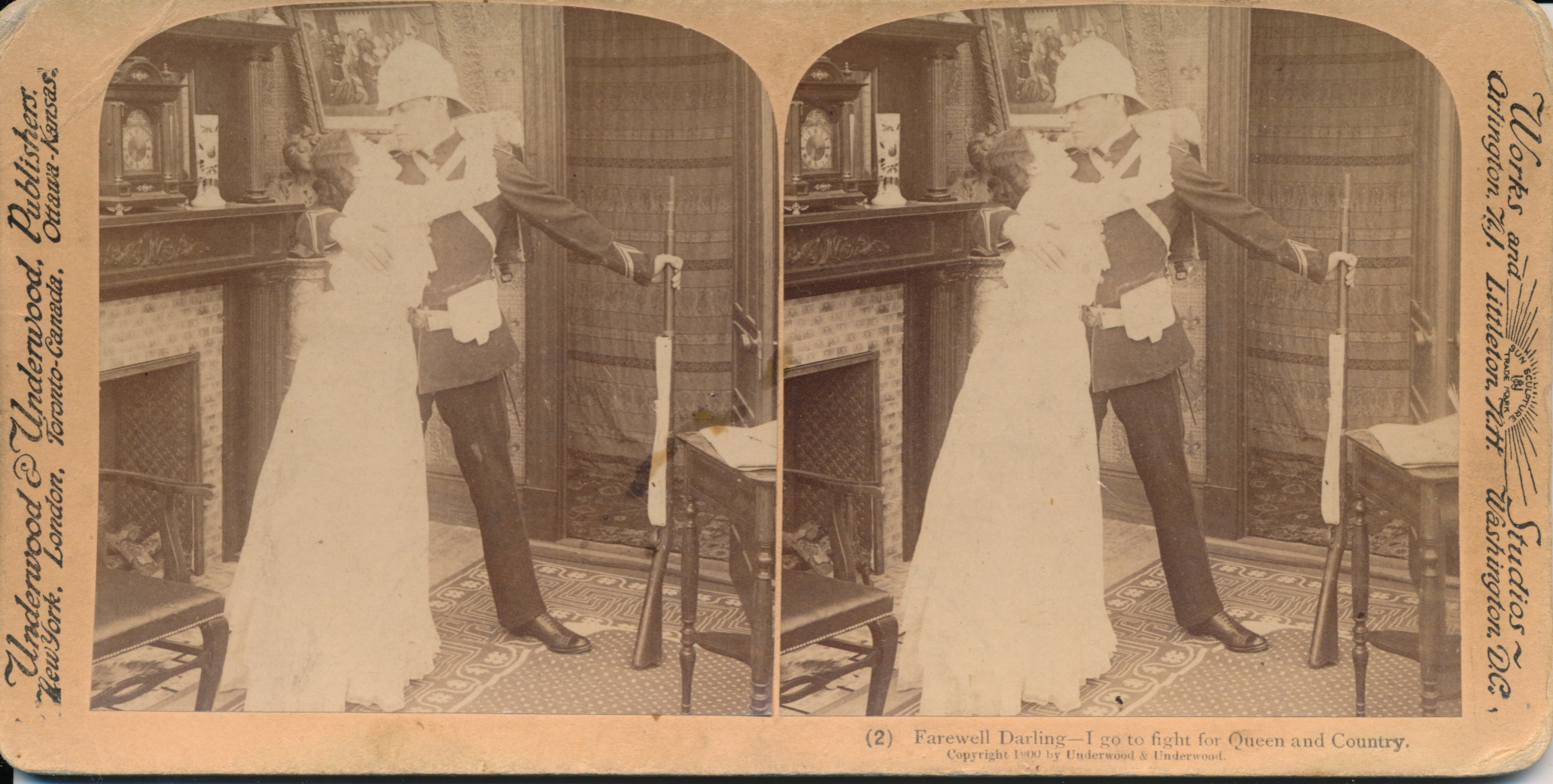
"Farewell Darling I go to fight for Queen and Country" 1900

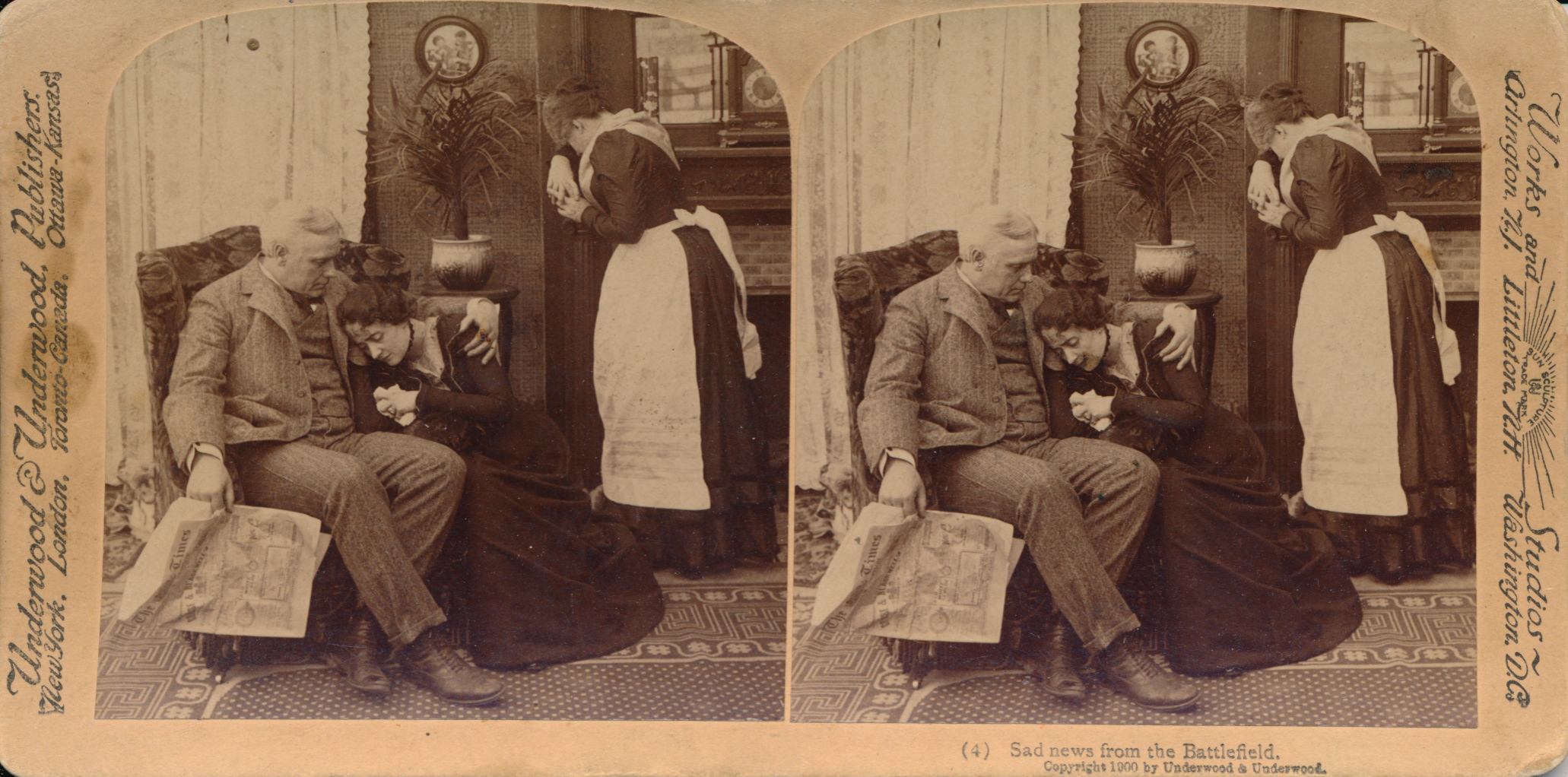
"Sad News from the Battlefield" 1900.

Indian Soldier in Hong Kong, 1900. Stereograph by Underwood and Underwood. Department of Image Collections, National Gallery of Art Library.

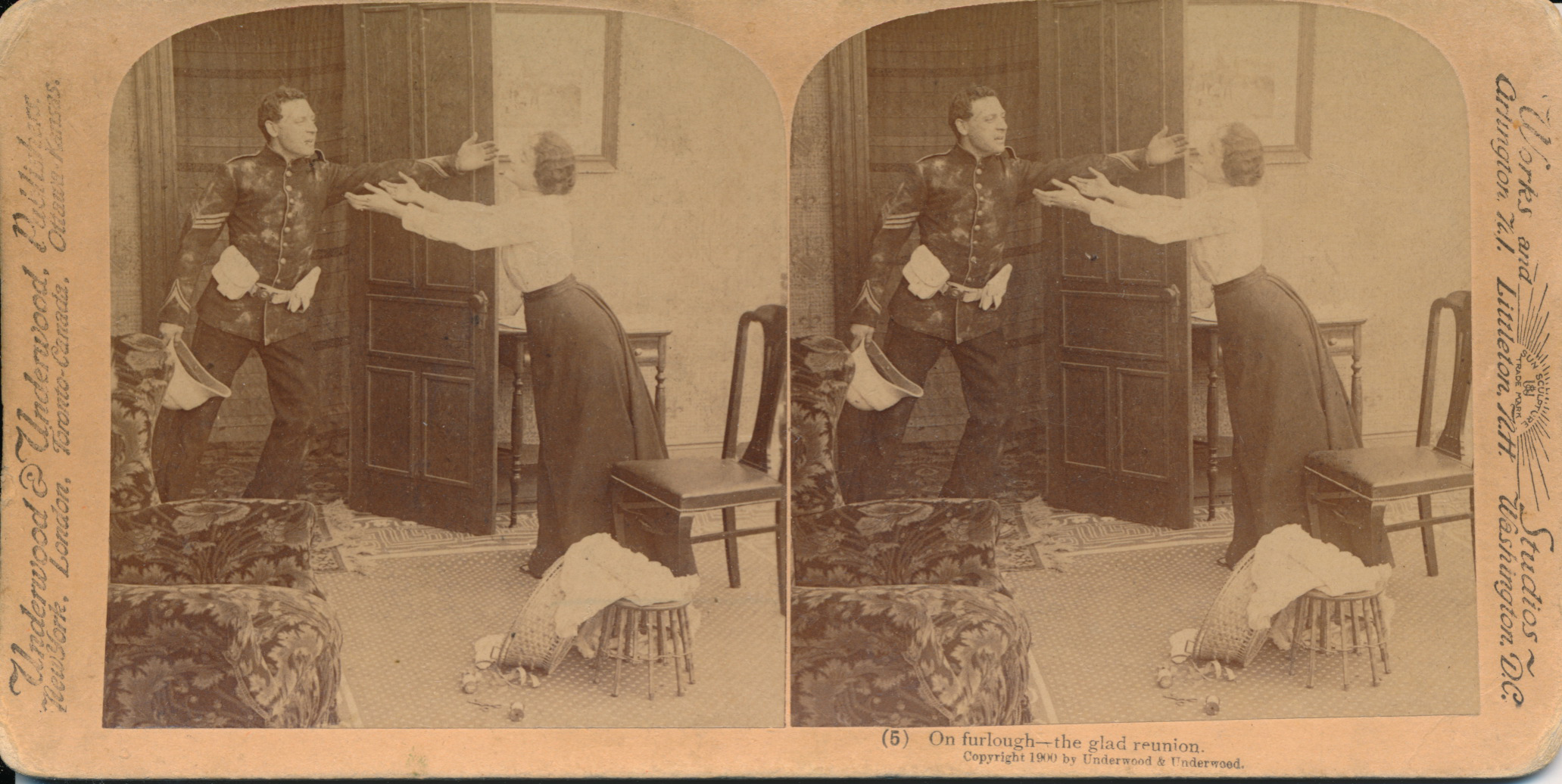
"On Furlough-the glad reunion" 1900.

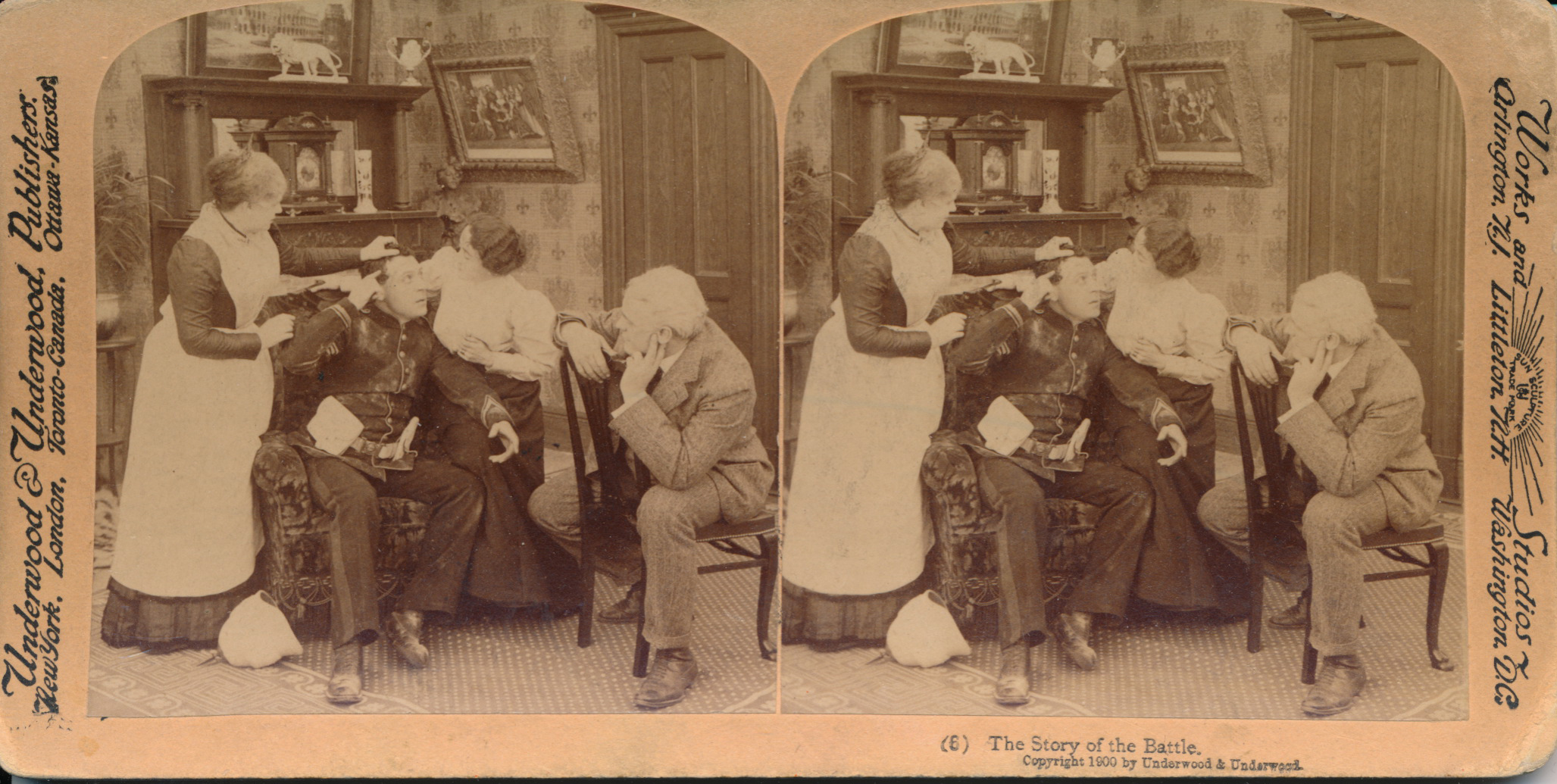
"The Story of the Battle" 1900.

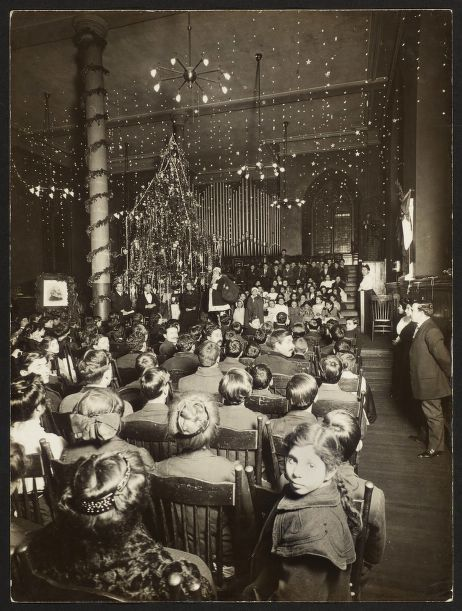
Children's Aid Society from Harvard's Underwood & Underwood 1909 Collection

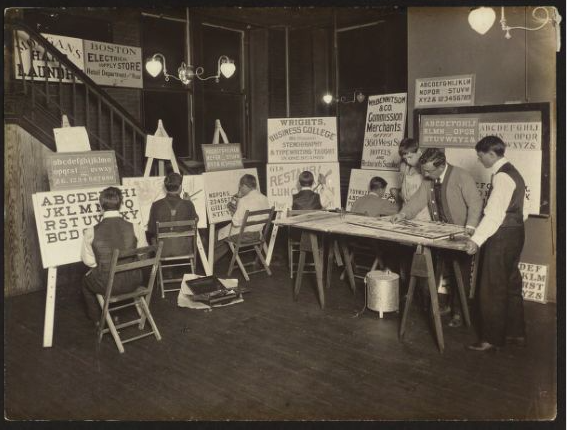
CAS from Harvard's Underwood & Underwood 1909 Collection

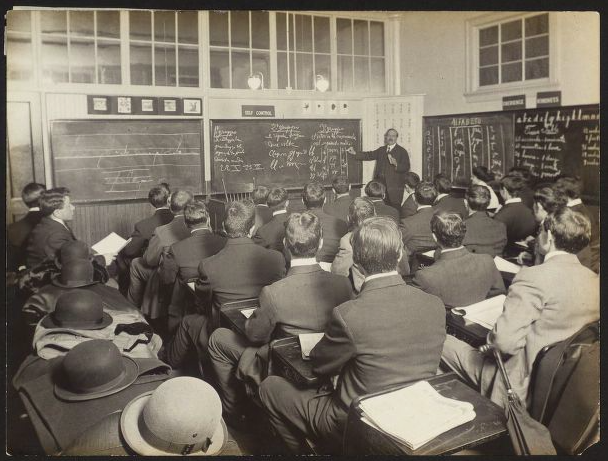
CAS from Harvard's Underwood & Underwood 1909 Collection

Agricultural Building at the World's Fair St. Louis, 1904. Stereograph by Underwood and Underwood. Department of Image Collections, National Gallery of Art Library.

CAS from Harvard's Underwood & Underwood 1909 Collection

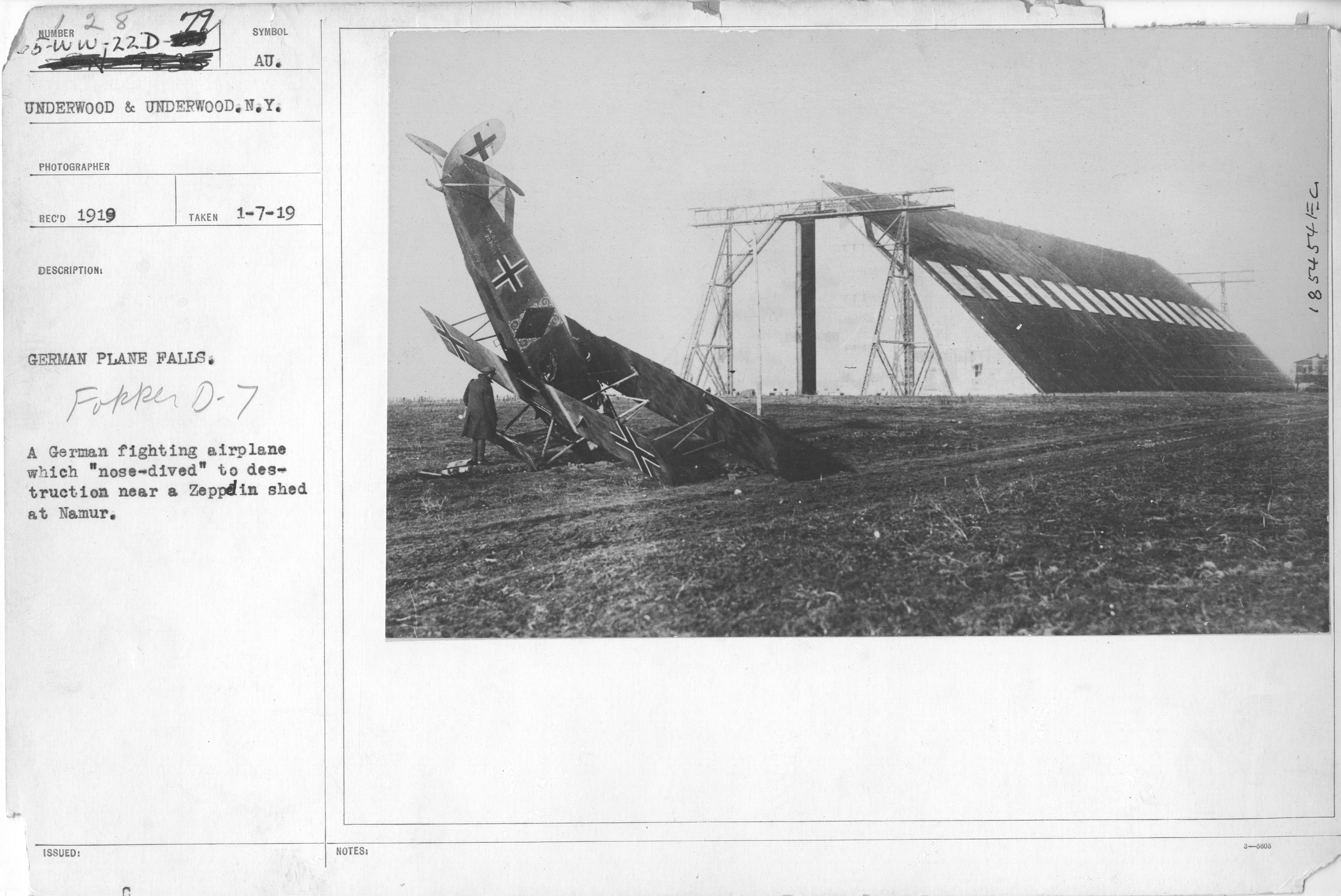
Fokker D VII (OAW) # 2024/18 which crashed at Zeppelin sheds at Namur, Belgium about 1918. {Underwood & Underwood Picture received by US War Department January 7,1919}

Temple of Hercules Victor, Rome by Underwood & Underwood, 1903. Department of Image Collections, National Gallery of Art Library.

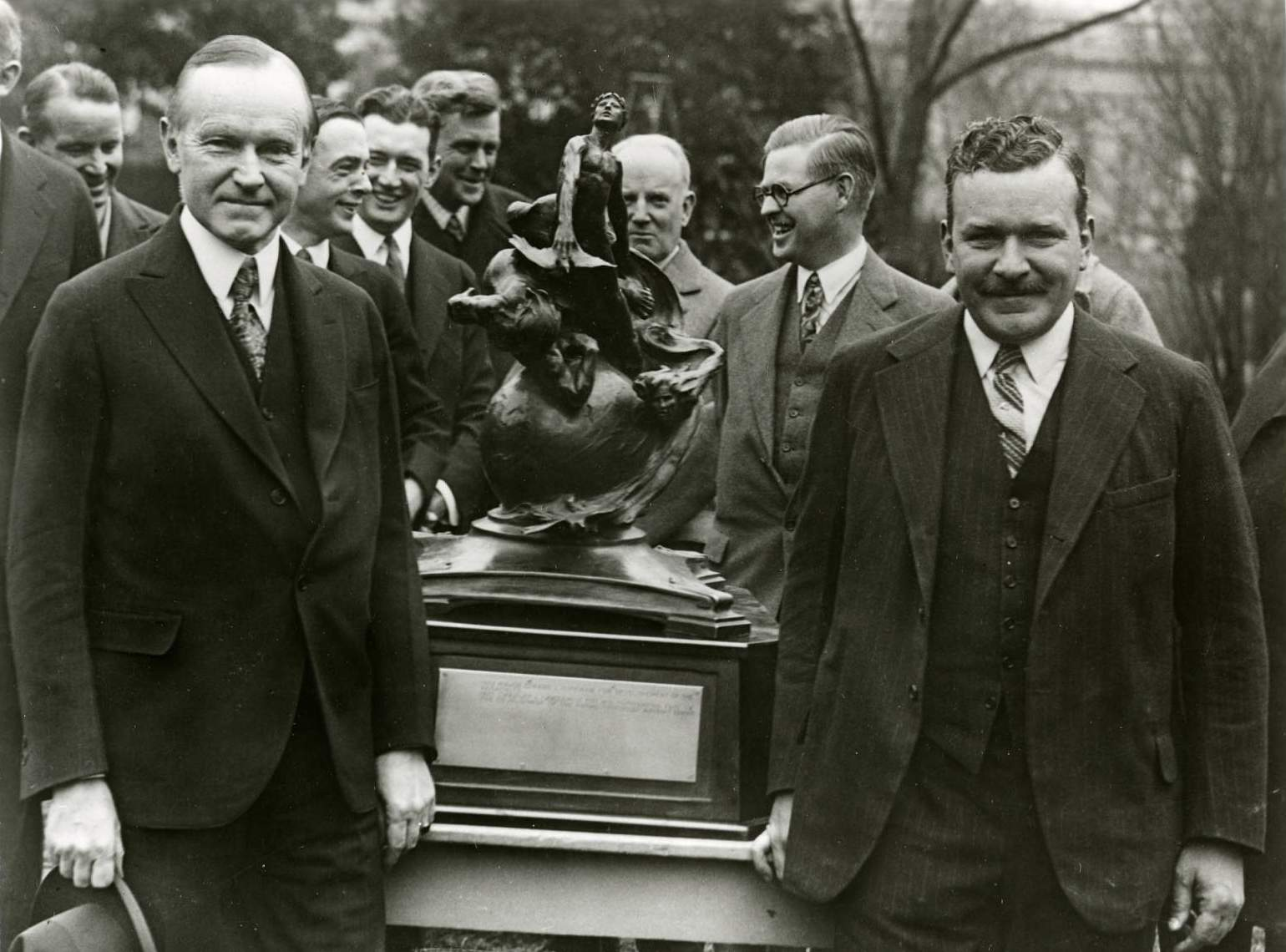
President Calvin Coolidge congratulated Charles Lawrance for his development of air-cooled aircraft radial engine that won the 1927 Collier Trophy for the year's greatest achievement in American aviation.

View of Niagara Falls, 1903. Stereograph by Underwood & Underwood. Department of Image Collections, National Gallery of Art Library.
