= Keystone View Company =

Stereoscopic image producer and distributor

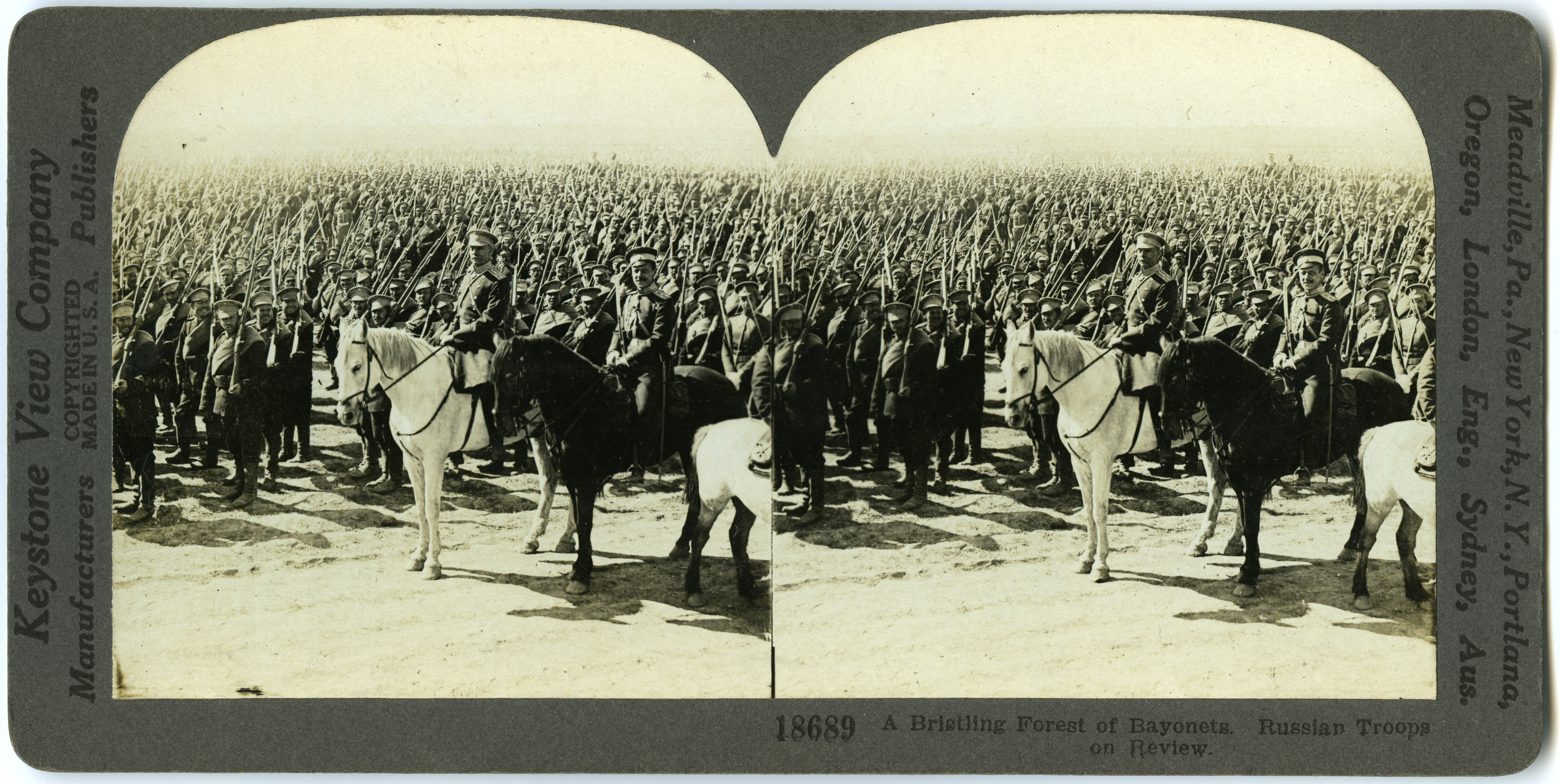
A product from the Keystone View Company, "A Bristling Forest of Bayonets. Russian Troops on Review." ca. 1914-1918

The Keystone View Company was a major distributor of stereographic images, and was located in Meadville, Pennsylvania. From 1892 through 1963 Keystone produced and distributed both educational and comic/sentimental stereoviews, and stereoscopes. By 1905 it was the world's largest stereographic company. In 1963 Department A (stereoviews sold to individual families) and the Education Departments were closed down, but Keystone continued to manufacture eye-training stereographic products as a subsidiary of Mast Development Company. In 1972 Mast closed the Meadville manufacturing site.

== Founder ==
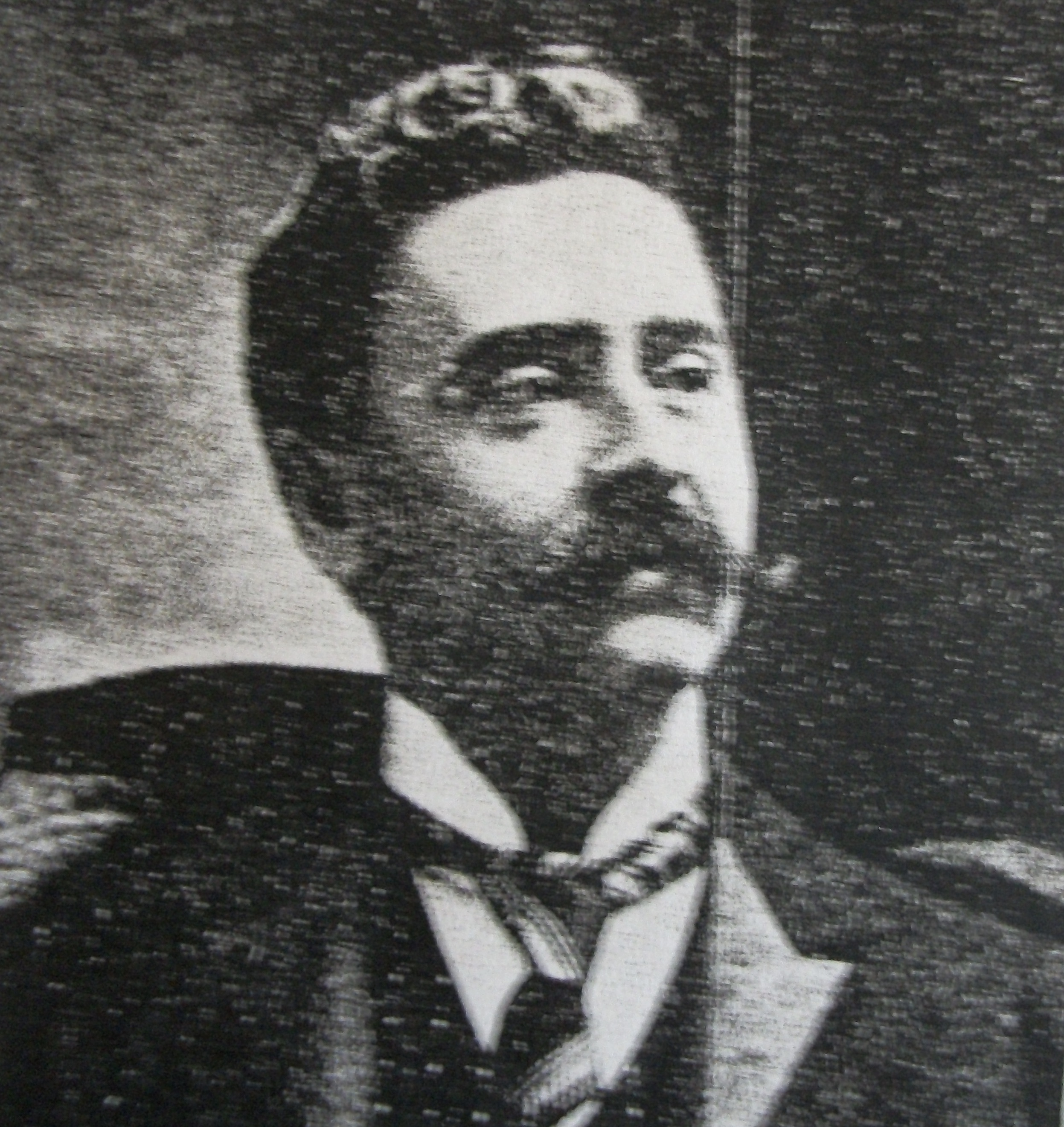
Founder of the Keystone View Company

The company was started in Meadville, Pennsylvania, by B.L. Singley, who previously was a salesman for Underwood & Underwood. Benneville Lloyd Singley was born December 8, 1864, in Union Township, Schuylkill County, Pennsylvania, in southeastern Pennsylvania.

In 1886 Singley came to Meadville, in northwestern Pennsylvania, to enroll at Allegheny College's preparatory department. College records list him as a first year prep student for three years in a row; after 1889 his name disappears from college listings. 1889 was the year that Singley married Anna Caraway, whose family lived in Meadville.

The Hall of Fame Annual states that while Singley was a college student James M. Davis showed him a stereograph of two silver gray foxes in the woods. Gazing at the three-dimensional image caused Singley to understand the educational potential of stereoscopic photography, and enkindled in him a desire to teach others through the use of stereoviews. James M. Davis distributed the stereoviews of the Kilburn Brothers and Benjamin W. Kilburn.

== Company formation ==
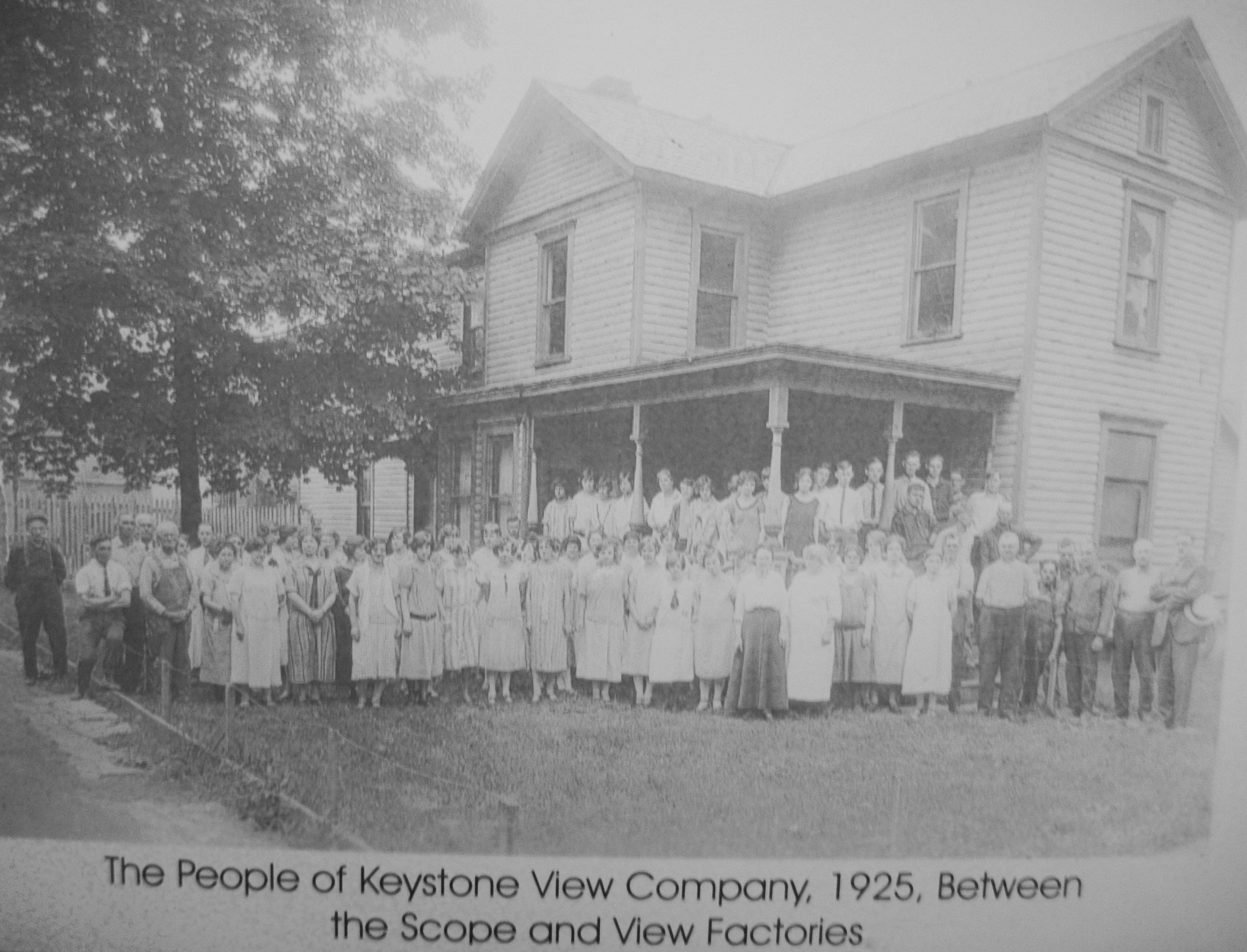
Keystone View Company employees

In 1892 French Creek overflowed its banks and flooded Meadville. Singley photographed the damage, developed multiple prints of 30 negatives and pasted them on cardboard mounts bearing the name of Keystone View Company. By 1895 the company had issued approximately 700 different views. In 1898 Keystone began making and selling stereoscopes.

The company expanded rapidly and by 1905, the year the Keystone View Company was incorporated, it was the largest business of its kind in the world. All of the manufacturing was done in Meadville, but branch offices were in New York, St. Louis, San Francisco, Portland, Oregon, Chicago, Toronto, Canada, and London, England. Salesmen and photographers were scattered around the world, and the company was offering 20,000 different views.

== Educational Department ==
In 1905 Keystone View Company began its Educational Department, selling views and glass lantern slides (the 4 x 3.25 inch ancestors of the better-known 2 x 2 inch slides containing transparencies on film, which eventually replaced them) to schools throughout the country. They also produced lantern slide projection equipment.

Selling stereoviews and lantern slides to schools was a field pioneered by Underwood & Underwood, and for several years Underwood and Keystone were competitors for the growing educational market. According to the 1953 Keystone Sales Manual the more aggressive sales methods and the more progressive editorial policies of the Keystone View Company soon made it the acknowledged leader in the work, and Underwood & Underwood decided to give up the contest.

Over the years hundreds of educational sets were marketed to teach geography, social studies, science, history and reading. They even produced and sold a special line of stereoview sets for medical students. Lantern slides and stereoviews were often combined in sets, with one side of a stereoview printed on glass so that a two-dimensional image could be projected on a screen for the entire class to see. Students could then take turns viewing the three-dimensional version of the photos with the stereoviews and one of the many stereoscopes that came with the set.

The large classroom sets came housed in furniture quality wooden cabinets, which were made by the company.

Between 1915 and 1921 Keystone View Company purchased the negatives of nearly all of its competitors; they also continued to have staff photographers travel the world, so that by 1935 Keystone had approximately two million stereoscopic negatives.

Keystone View Company produced stereographic sets up through the mid-twentieth century, and had a stereoscopic photographer on staff until at least 1955.

== Stereoscophthalmic Department ==
In 1932 Keystone's Stereoscophthalmic Department was formed to meet the needs of eye specialists, safety and efficiency engineers and psychologists who needed stereoscopic tests. Keystone stereoscopic vision tests were used to test automobile and truck drivers, as well as airplane pilots. For those diagnosed with certain vision problems special Keystone stereoscopes and stereoviews were used in the home for daily eye-training exercises.

As long as the Keystone View Company was owned by those who lived and worked in Meadville the Educational Department and Department A stereoviews continued to be produced. But as time went on the Stereoscophthalmic Department gained in importance.

== Changes in company leadership ==
In 1936 B.L. Singley retired as the president of the Keystone View Company. He died on November 15, 1938, at the age of 73. After Singley's retirement two long-time Keystone employees, Charles E. Crandall and George E. Hamilton, purchased all of the Keystone View Company stock. For the next 20 years Crandall and Hamilton would run Keystone, and all three departments would continue operation.

On November 19, 1956, Keystone President Charles E. Crandall died in his office. George E. Hamilton became the sole shareholder, as well as the president, of the Keystone View Company. Hamilton died on May 15, 1962. In 1963 Keystone was purchased by Mast Development Company of Davenport, Iowa. The company was owned by Gifford Mast and John Niemeyer.

== End of the company ==
As a subsidiary of Mast Development Company, Keystone produced telebinoculars, eye training products and overhead projectors. In 1972 Gifford Mast closed down the Meadville manufacturing site, although the name of Keystone View Company continues to be used on eye training equipment.

In 1978, the company's records and inventory of negatives, weighing more than 30 tons, were donated to the UCR/California Museum of Photography at the University of California Riverside, where they are now known as the Keystone-Mast collection.

In 2002, the Johnson-Shaw Stereoscopic Museum opened in Keystone View's hometown of Meadville to celebrate the company. It has a large archive of Keystone images and equipment that was purchased following the closure of the company's Meadville facilities.

== Numbering of the stereoviews ==
If the number on the Keystone stereoview:

- begins with the letter V, an Underwood & Underwood negative was used;
- begins with the letter W, an H. C. White negative was used;
- ends with the letter T, it is part of a Keystone “Tour of the World” set.

On some views a number will appear in the upper center of the stereograph. This is a "set" number. It is the position of that view in its particular boxed set.

== Keystone Press Agencies ==
During World War I, the Keystone View Company merged with Press Illustrated Service.

Keystone-SDA/Keystone-ATS and others are related to the American Keystone Press Agency, that emerged from the Keystone View Company and Press Illustrated Services. It was built up in 1924, in London, by the Hungarian emigrant Bernhard [or Bert, or Bertram] Garai (1890–1973), also known later as Alexandre Garai.

At Keystone Press Agency Munich, Lotte Sigg initially took care of the sale of images. Max Schneider (1924–1998), the journalist, took over sales in 1953 at Keystone Press Agency Munich and later founded the independent sole proprietorship "Keystone-Press, Max Schneider" in Zurich.

Keystone Press Agency had branches or independent sole proprietorships in New York, Montreal (Bob Moynier, 1960), Paris, Brazil (Agnes Garai), and London (Bertram Garai).

Keystone Press Agency London was founded in 1918 by Bertram "Bert" Garai.

== Modern Computer Vision ==
Over 37,000 images from the original negatives were analyzed in a computer vision project in 2020. The project attempted to reconstruct attributes of the original shooting characteristics, and recover depth information for reconstructing scenes in 3D on modern displays.
