= Charles Bierstadt =

American photographer

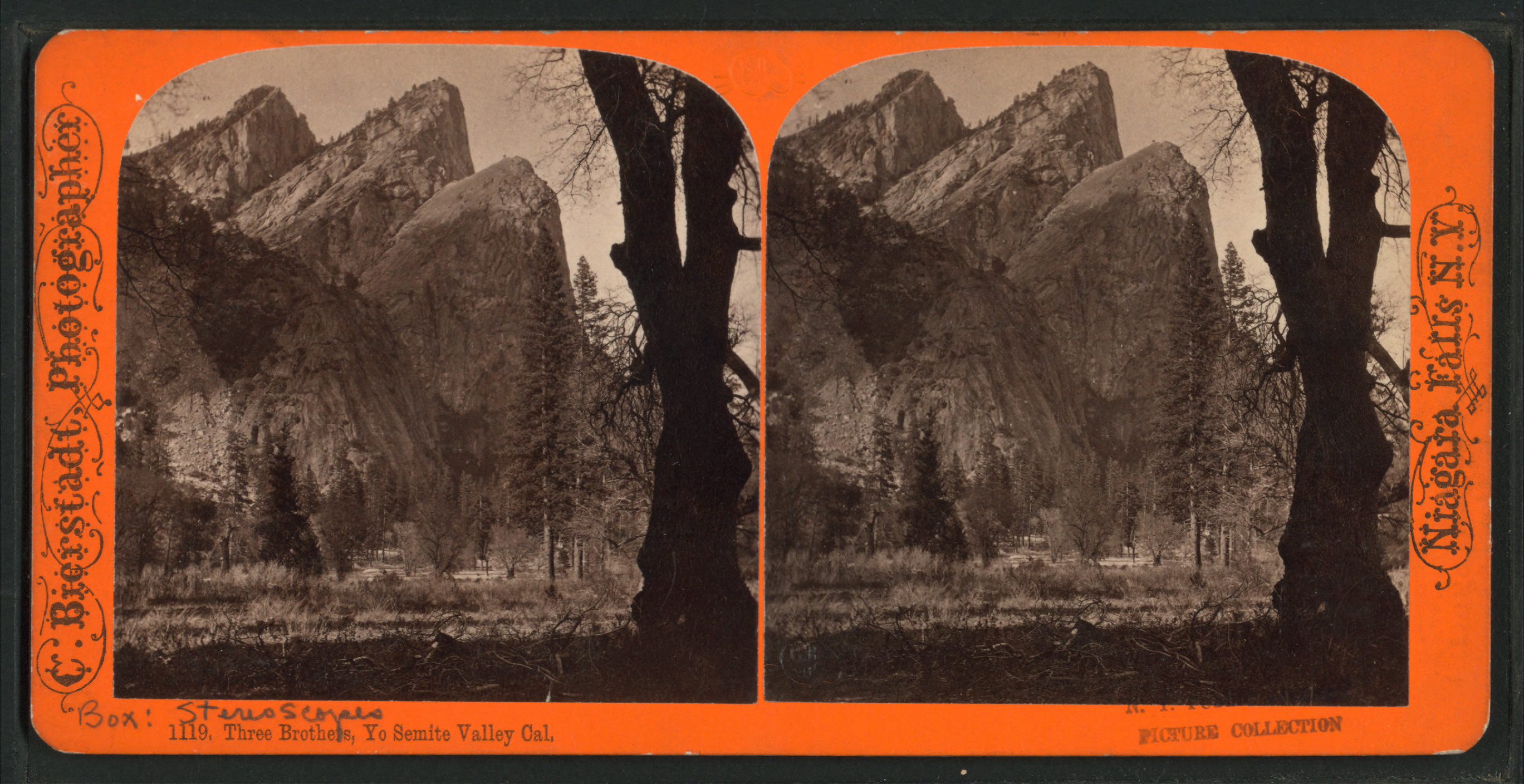
Yosemite, CA, 1870 - 1885

Charles Bierstadt (1819–1903) was an American photographer who specialized in stereoscopic views.

== Biography ==
Bierstadt was born at Solingen, Prussia, November 28, 1819, a son of Henry Bierstadt. He was the older brother of the landscape painter Albert Bierstadt. He was educated in the national schools of his native town and New Bedford, Massachusetts, whence his parents moved in 1831. At fifteen years of age he began his apprenticeship at cabinetmaking and during his six years of service he spent some time in the study of photography, in which, in 1856, he and his other younger brother Edward Bierstadt made numerous trials and experiments which proved successful, and then they established themselves in business as photographers. In 1863 Bierstadt moved his business to Niagara Falls, New York where he carried it on with great success. He was an expert in stereoscopic views and had in connection with his manufactory a large bazaar where his views and many relics and curios were displayed to advantage. In 1870 he visited California and photographed Yosemite. In 1873, he traveled for five months to Europe, Palestine, Egypt, and Tripoli to take photographs published the next year. While in Europe, he won the highest award at the 1873 Vienna World's Fair for his stereoviews of Niagara Falls.

Bierstadt died in Niagara Falls in 1903.
