= Edward Bierstadt =

American photographer

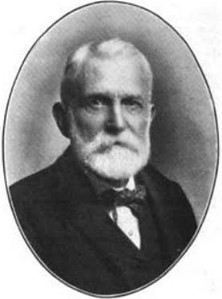
- Born: September 11, 1824; Solingen, Rhine Province, Prussia
- Died: June 15, 1906 (aged 81); New York City, U.S.
- Occupations: Photographer, engraver

Edward Bierstadt (September 11, 1824 – June 15, 1906) was a photographer of portraits and landscapes as well as an engraver and a pioneer of color photography in the United States.

== Early life ==
Bierstadt was born in Solingen, Rhine Province, Prussia, on September 11, 1824. He was the son of Henry Bierstadt (1785–1866), a cooper, and Christiana (née Tilmans) Bierstadt (1792–1864). His younger brother was noted painter Albert Bierstadt.

As a boy, his family moved to the United States, and they settled in New Bedford, Massachusetts.

== Career ==
In 1860, he opened his own studio in New York City along with his brother, Albert Bierstadt, whose artwork he made into engravings. He produced stereoscopic images for Bierstadt Brothers, together with his other older brother Charles Bierstadt.

Bierstadt was hired by William West Durant to take a series of photos for an advertising brochure entitled The Adirondacks, Artotype Views Among the Mountains and Lakes of the North Woods to publicize Blue Mountain Lake and Raquette Lake in the Adirondacks.

He founded the Photo-Plate Printing Company in 1870, which produced collotype prints for several significant book illustrations. The company was considered one of the best printers in the United States.

Bierstadt held an 1876 patent for an improvement to the stereoscope. Along with his brother, he produced some stereoscopic photographs from across the country, sometimes credited as the "Bierstadt Brothers".

Bierstadt was a pioneer of color photography. He mainly used the subtractive method to take color photographs and subsequently printed his results. Bierstadt learned about color photography from Joseph Albert. In November 1877, Bierstadt exhibited three color Albertype prints at the American Institute in New York City.

In 1894, his work in color photography gained attention when he exhibited prints of oil and watercolor paintings, portraits, floral studies, and other subjects. Bierstadt's color reproductions of rugs were so accurate that they were used by salesmen on the street instead of carrying the actual rugs themselves.

Bierstadt said that he made color portraits as early as July 1890, which is the earliest claim for a color photographic portrait. He first exhibited color portraits in 1892 and continued to do so throughout the 1890s. These portraits, which required several minutes of exposure time, were highly regarded despite their imperfections. Bierstadt's only surviving color portrait is that of his younger brother, Albert Bierstadt.

Bierstadt's work in color photography also extended to microscopic photography. In collaboration with Dr. Edward Leaming at Columbia College, he produced color photographs of microscopic specimens in 1895 and 1896. In 1904, when Bierstadt turned 80, he was still engaged in researching color photography.

Bierstadt died in New York City on June 15, 1906.

== Gallery ==
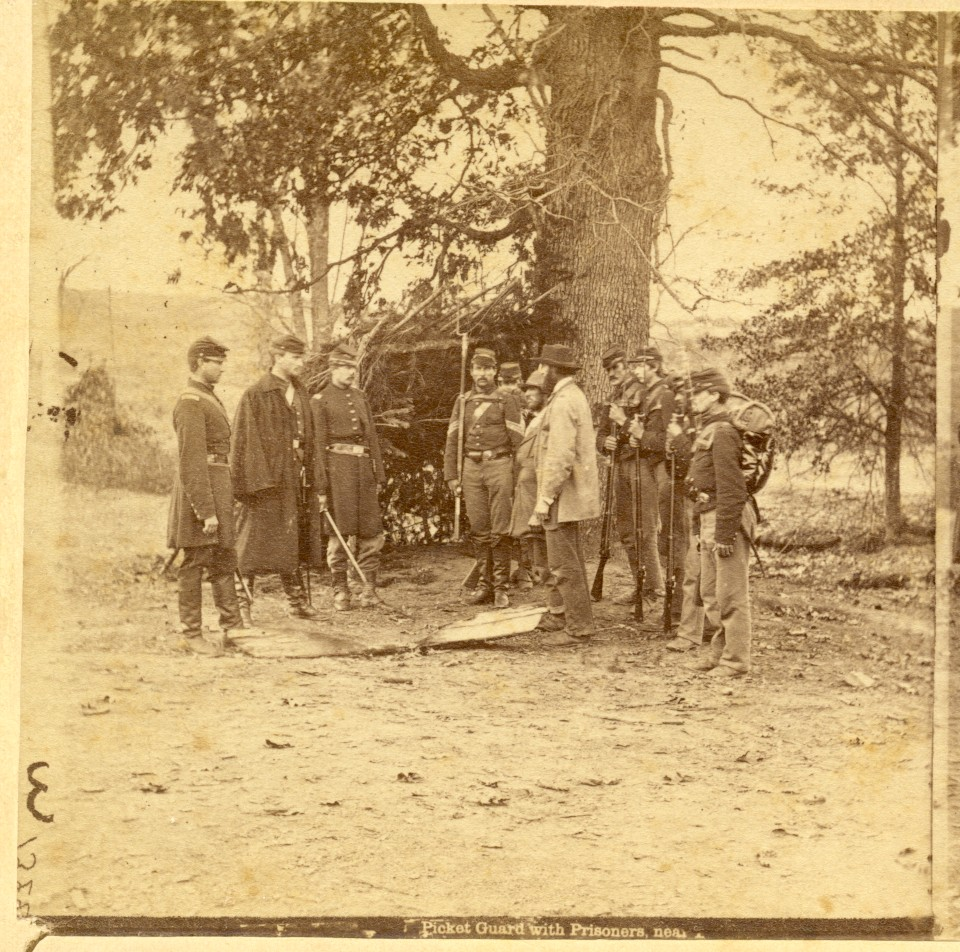
The "Cameron Highlanders" of the 79th New York Infantry Regiment, 1861

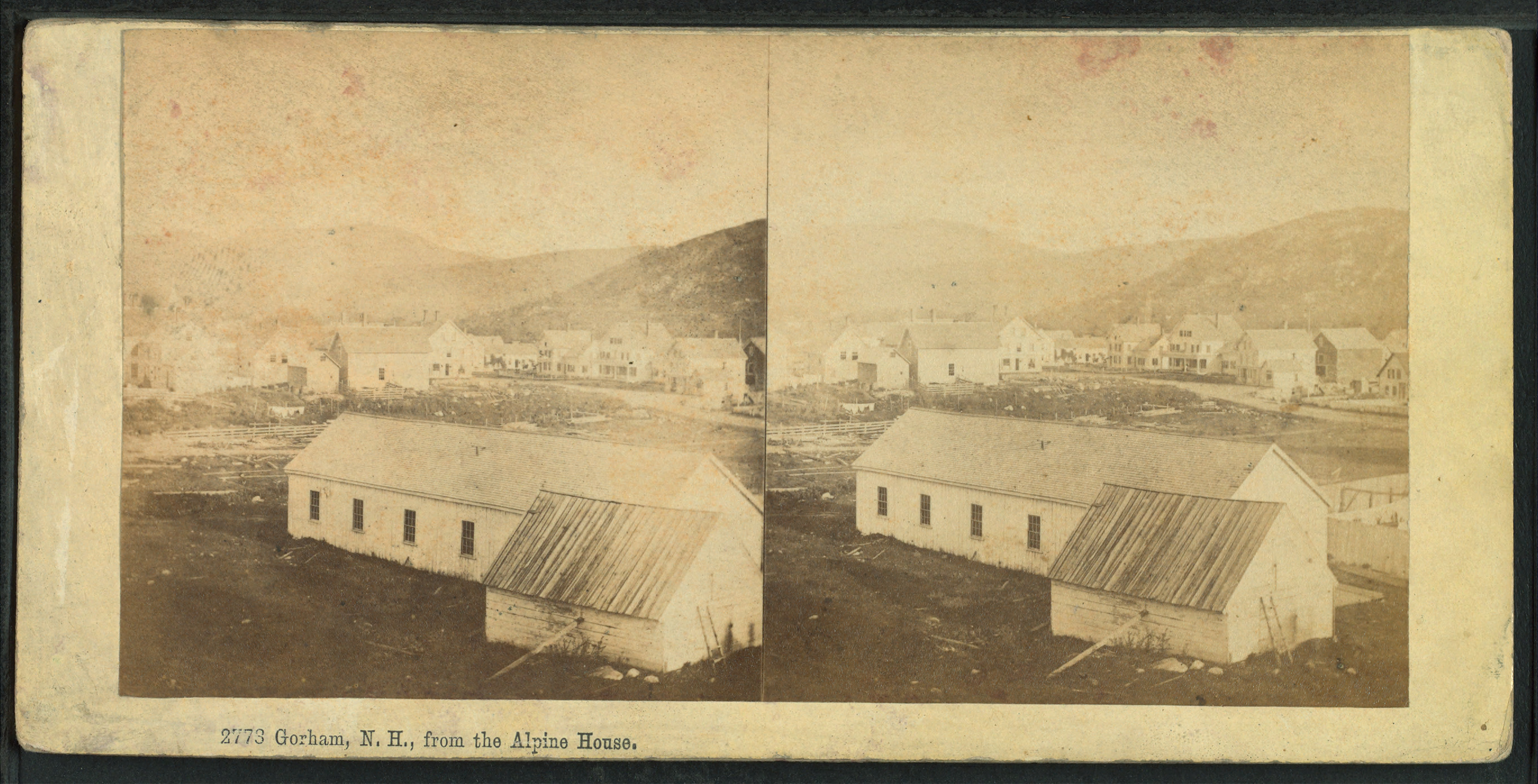
Stereo photograph of Gorham, New Hampshire, made by the Bierstadt brothers

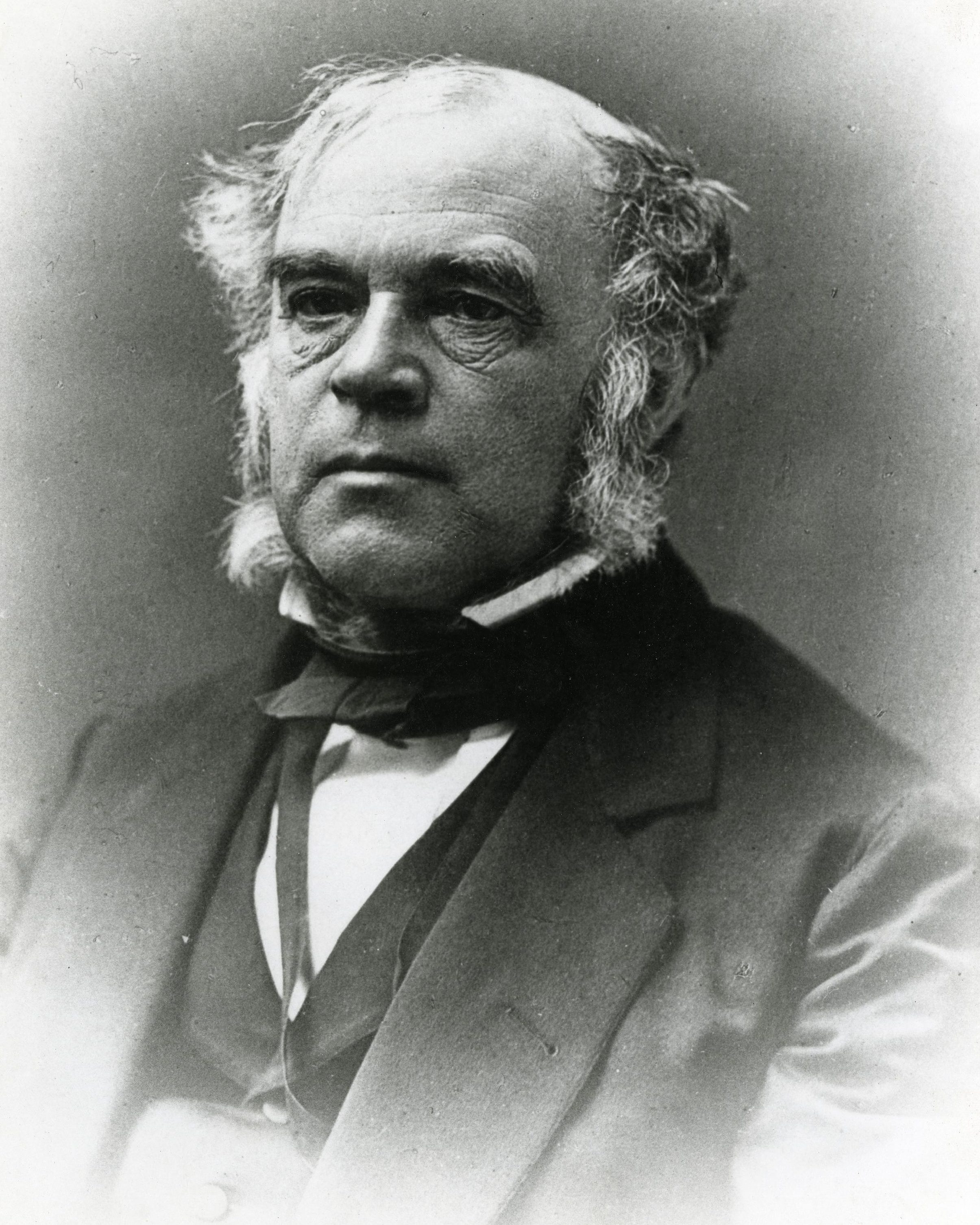
John William Draper, American scientist and pioneer of photography, c. 1879

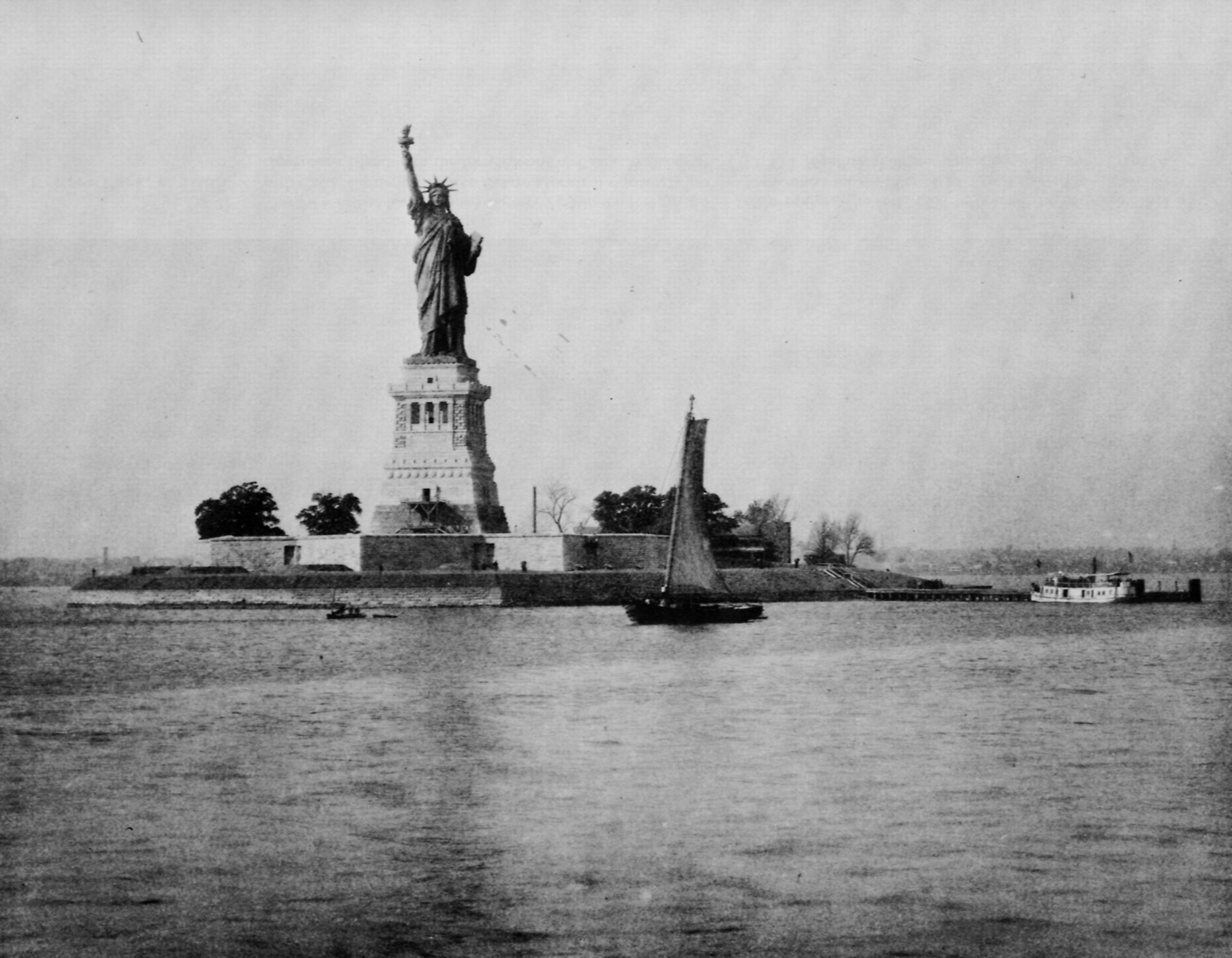
The Statue of Liberty, c. 1886

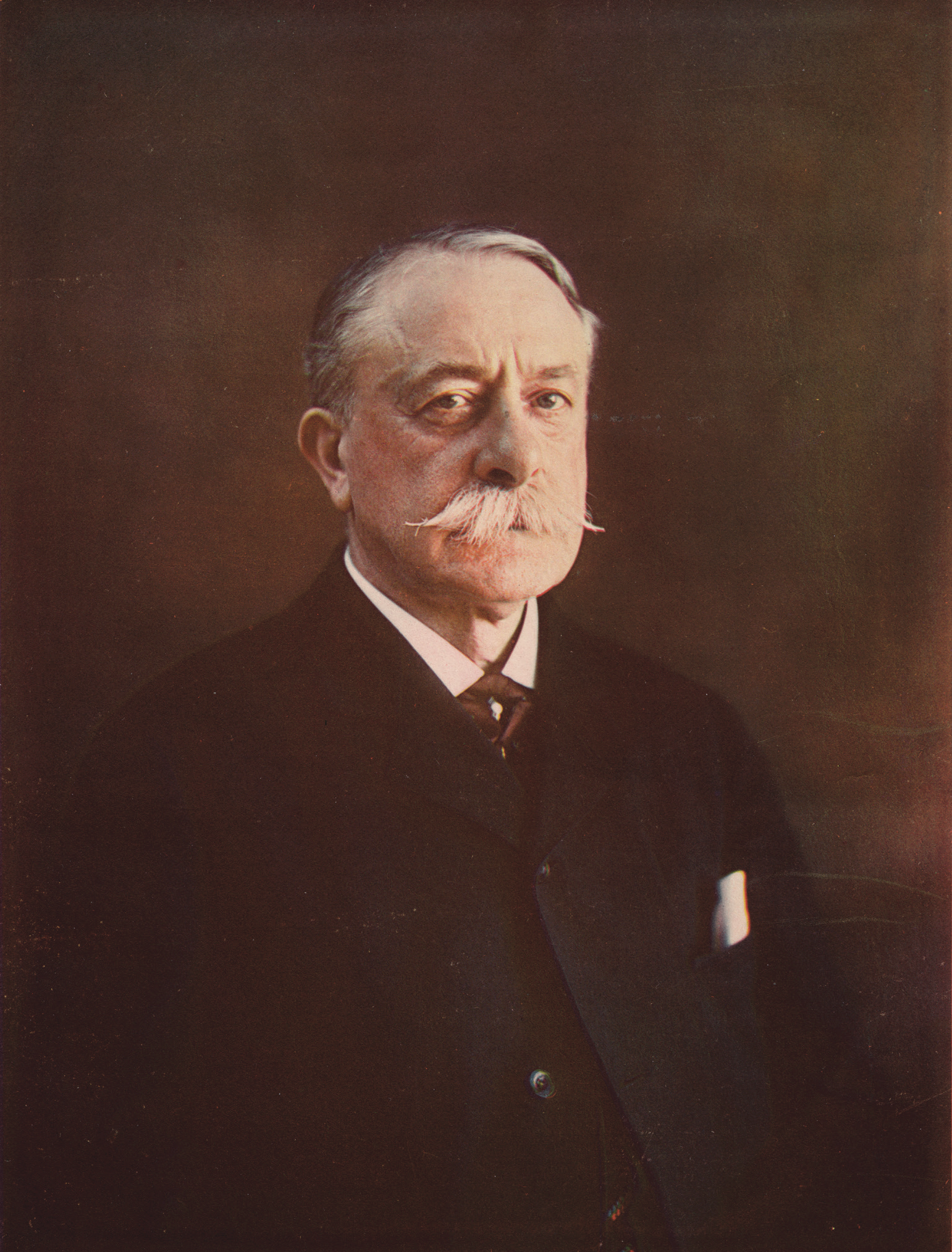
Portrait of Albert Bierstadt, possibly the oldest surviving color portrait photograph. This collotype print was sent in 1895 to Elbridge T. Gerry.

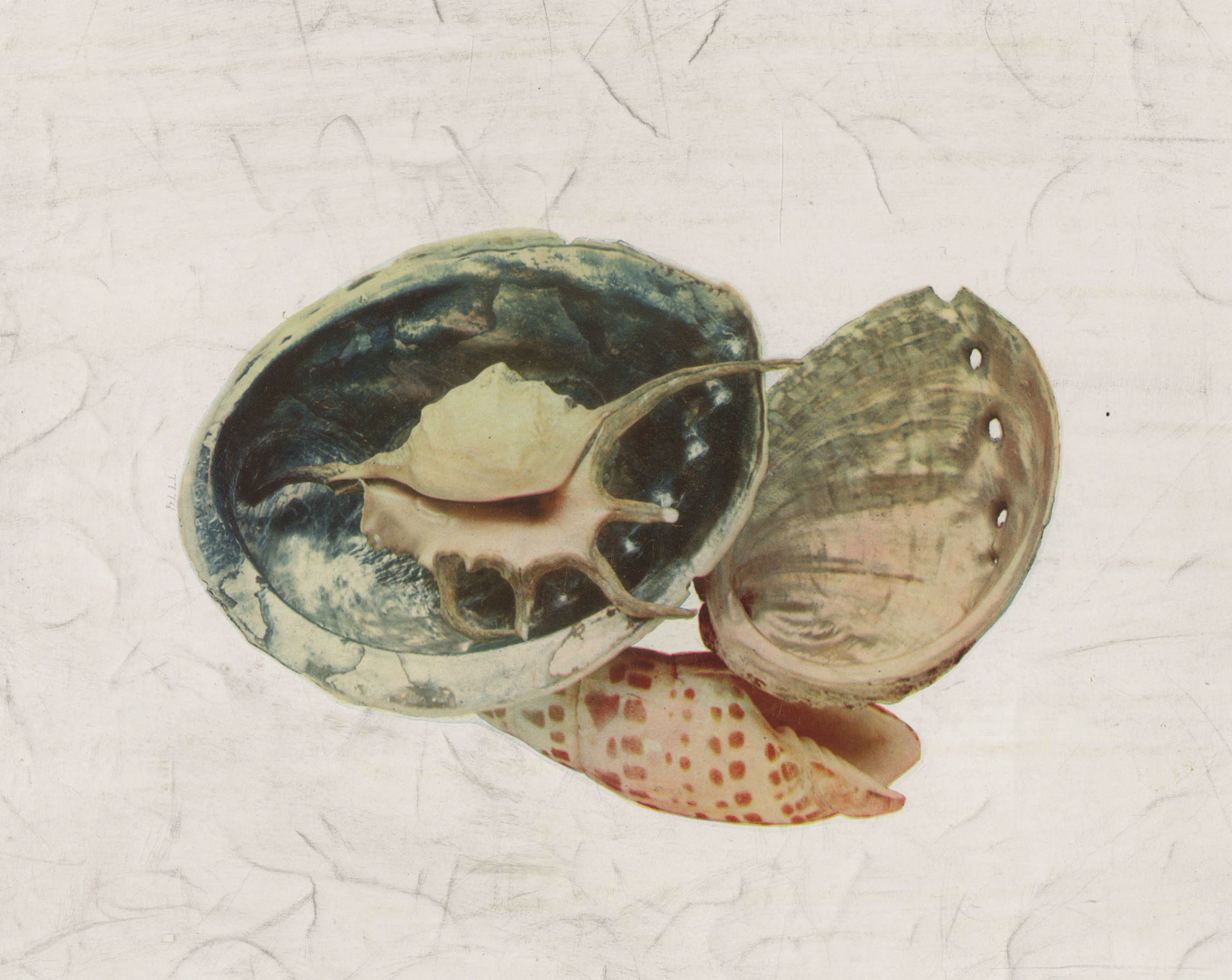
Color collotype print of seashells, c. 1894

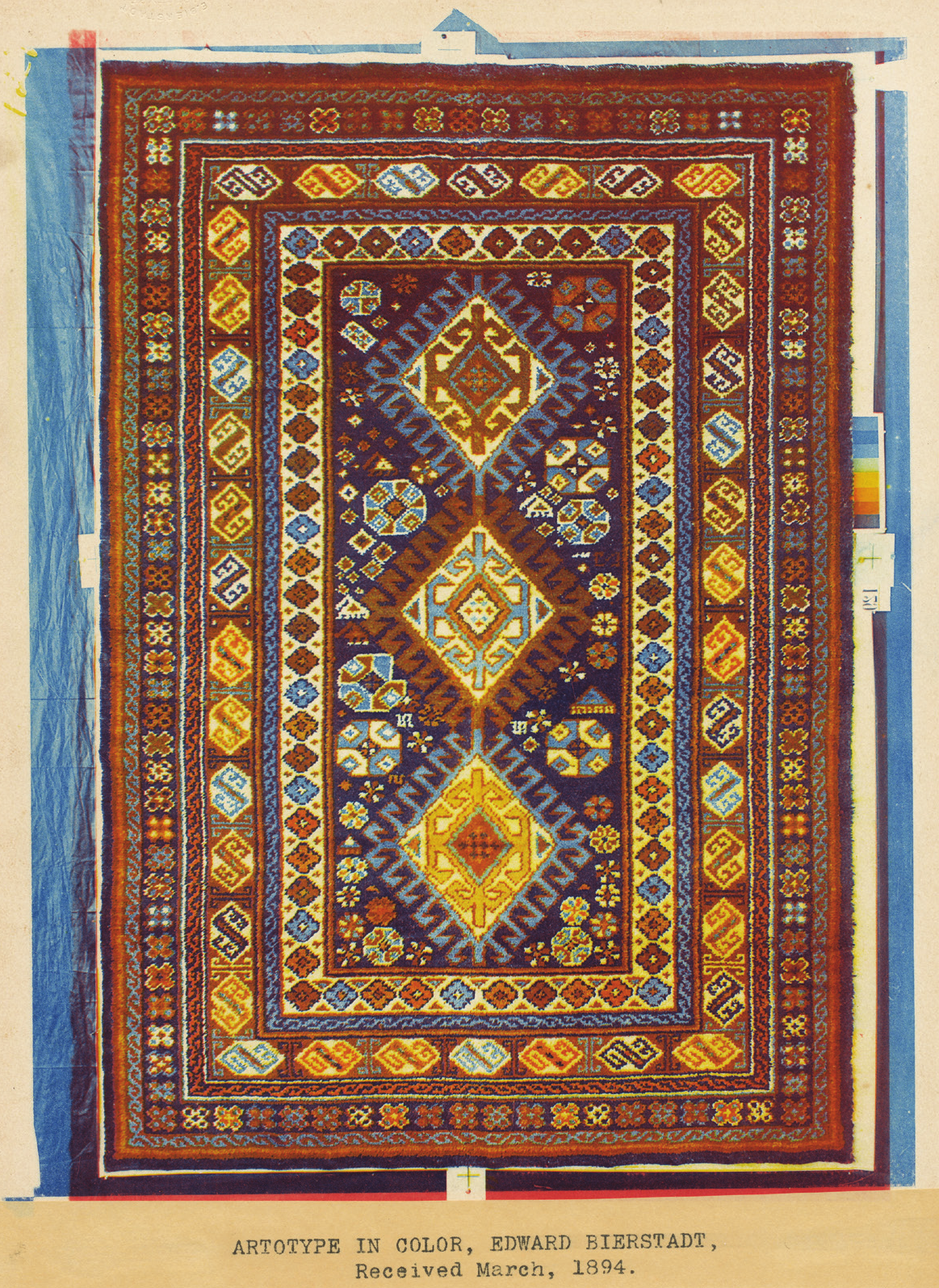
Artotype color print of a rug by Bierstadt, c. 1894.
