= Sargent's Purchase, New Hampshire =

Township in Coos County, New Hampshire, United States

- Township
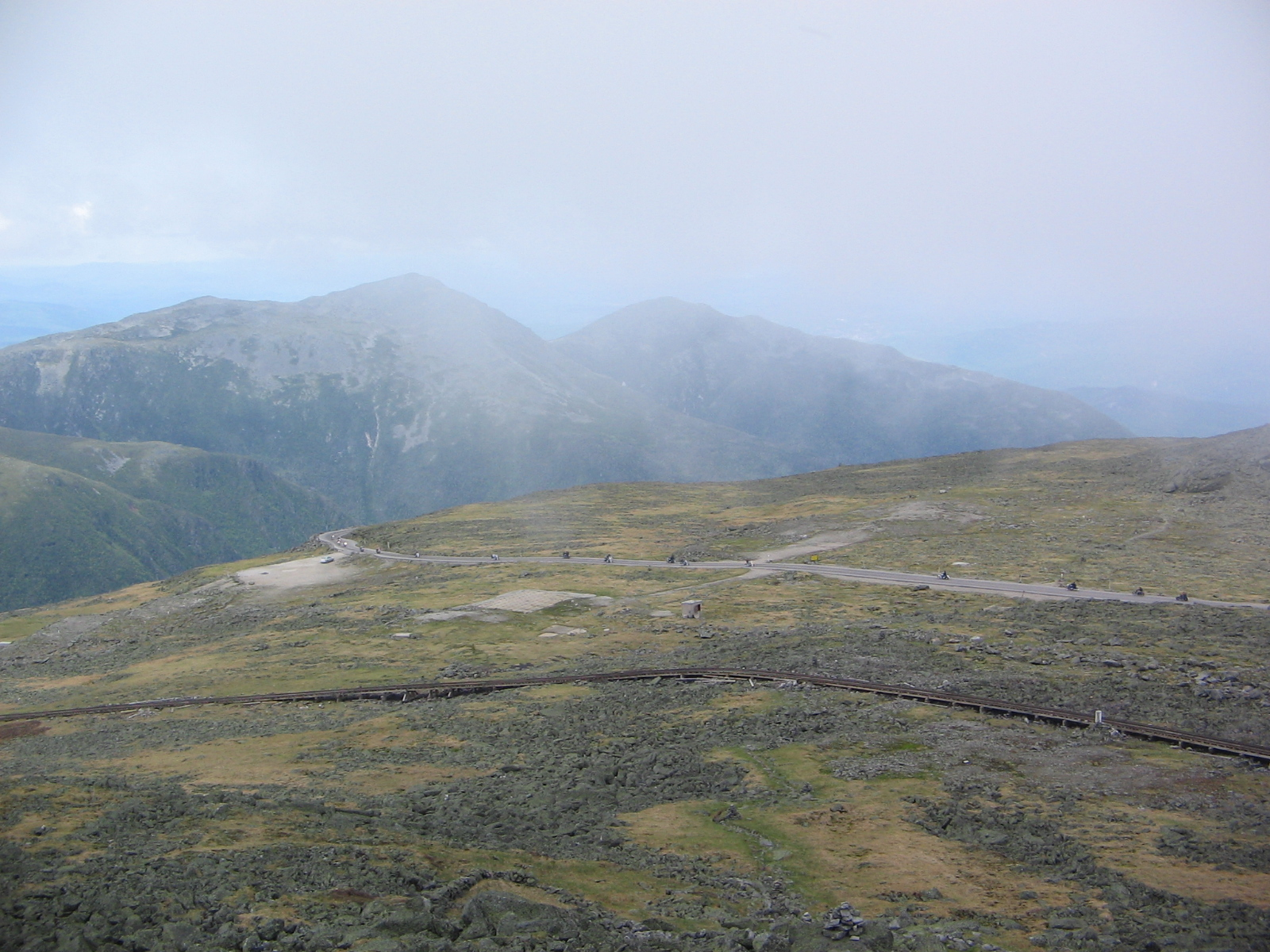
- Mount Washington Auto Road, approaching the summit

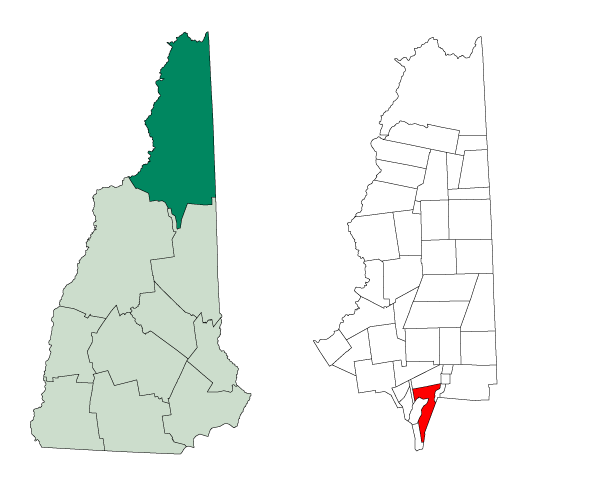
- Coordinates: 44°13′51″N 71°16′32″W
- Country: United States
- State: New Hampshire
- County: Coös

Area
  - Total: 25.88 sq mi (67.02 km^{2})
  - Land: 25.87 sq mi (67.00 km^{2})
  - Water: 0.0077 sq mi (0.02 km^{2}) 0.02%
- Elevation: 3,530 ft (1,080 m)

Population (2020)
  - Total: 0
- Time zone: UTC-5 (EST)
  - Summer (DST): UTC-4 (EDT)
- ZIP code: 03589 (Note: Used by a small post office in the Sherman Adams summit building at the Mount Washington Observatory, for outgoing mail)
- Area code: 603
- FIPS code: 33-007-67860
- GNIS feature ID: 872626

Sargent's Purchase is a township in Coös County, New Hampshire, United States. It lies within the White Mountain National Forest, and the summit of Mount Washington is located within the township. As of the 2020 census, the population was zero.

In New Hampshire, locations, grants, townships (which are different from towns), and purchases are unincorporated portions of a county which are not part of any town or city and have limited self-government (if any, as many are uninhabited).

== History ==
The first known explorer to have set foot in what is now known as Sargent's Purchase was Darby Field, who claimed to have made the first ascent of Mount Washington in 1642. Sargent's Purchase was granted to Jacob Sargent and others on May 31, 1832. In May 1866, Sylvester Marsh of Campton, New Hampshire, began construction of the Mount Washington Cog Railway, primarily in Thompson and Meserve's Purchase, but the uppermost half mile being within Sargent's Purchase. The Cog Railway was completed in 1869.

== Geography ==
The township is in the White Mountains of New Hampshire and includes the summit of Mount Washington, the highest mountain in New England, with an elevation of 6,288 feet (1,917 m) above sea level. Other notable summits within the purchase include Mount Monroe, at 5,380 feet (1,640 m); Mount Isolation, at 4,004 feet (1,220 m); and Stairs Mountain, at 3,468 feet (1,057 m). The Appalachian Trail crosses the northwestern part of the township, including the summit of Mount Washington, as well as the northeastern corner of the township.

According to the United States Census Bureau, the township has a total area of 25.9 square miles (67.0 km^{2}), of which 0.01 square miles (0.02 km^{2}), or 0.02%, are water. The Ammonoosuc River has its source on the west side of Mount Washington and drains the northwestern corner of the township, part of the Connecticut River watershed. The northeastern corner of the township, drained by the Peabody River, is part of the Androscoggin River watershed. The remainder of the township is part of the Saco River watershed: the Dry River begins in Oakes Gulf on the south side of Mount Washington, while the Ellis River begins in Tuckerman Ravine on the east side of the mountain. The Rocky Branch, a third tributary of the Saco, drains the southern part of Sargent's Purchase.

=== Adjacent municipalities ===
- Thompson and Meserve's Purchase (north)
- Pinkham's Grant (northeast)
- Jackson (east)
- Bartlett (southeast)
- Hadley's Purchase (southwest)
- Cutt's Grant (west)
- Chandler's Purchase (northwest)

== Demographics ==
Historical population
| Census | Pop. | Note | %± |
|---|---|---|---|
| 1860 | 6 | | — |
| 1930 | 0 | | — |
| 1940 | 0 | | — |
| 1950 | 16 | | — |
| 1960 | 17 | | 6.3% |
| 1970 | 0 | | −100.0% |
| 1980 | 1 | | — |
| 1990 | 0 | | −100.0% |
| 2000 | 0 | | — |
| 2010 | 3 | | — |
| 2020 | 0 | | −100.0% |
U.S. Decennial Census

As of the 2020 census, there were no permanent residents in the township.
