= Green's Grant, New Hampshire =

Township in Coos County, New Hampshire, United States

- Township
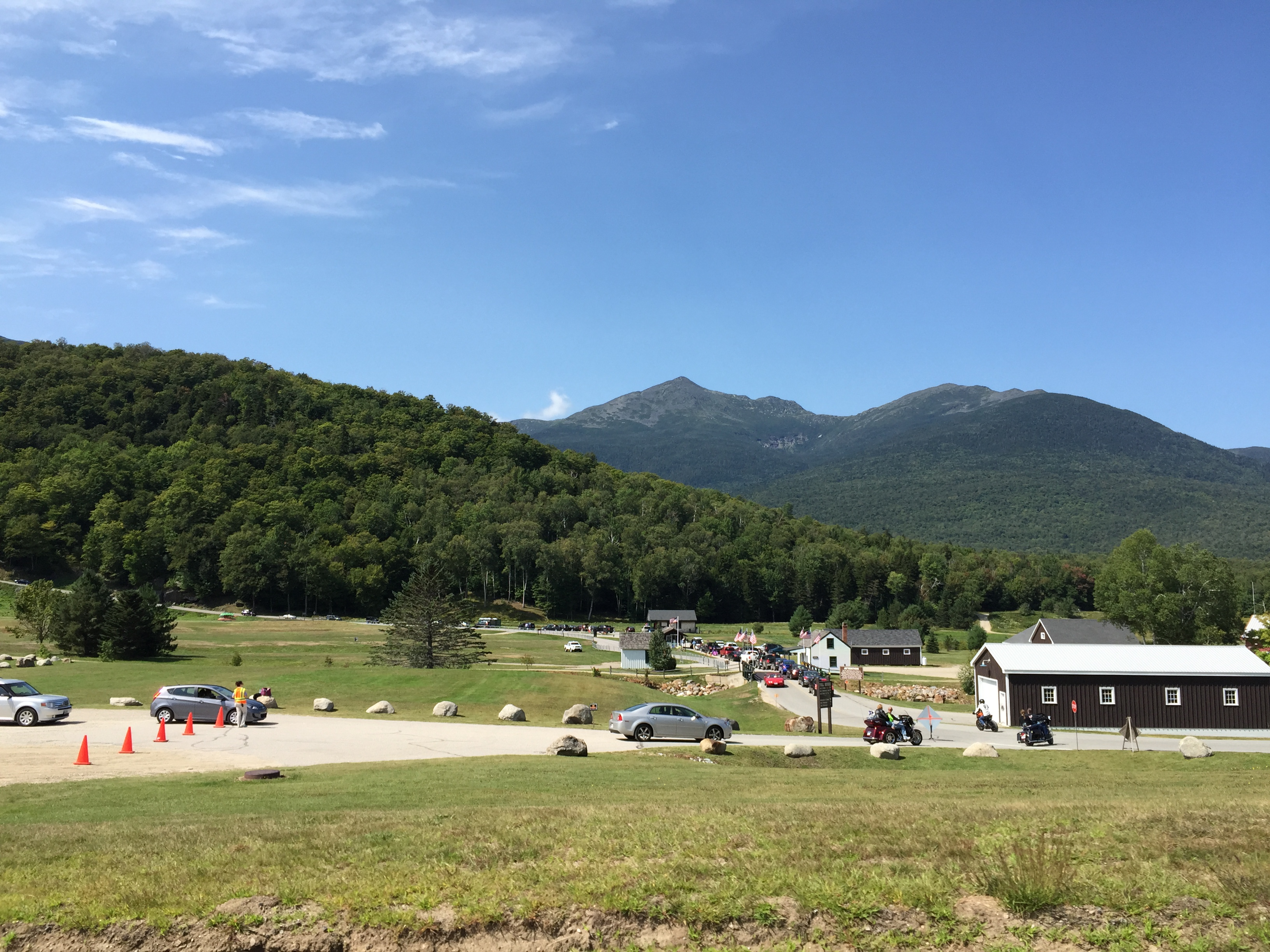
- The bottom (east end) of the Mount Washington Auto Road is in Green's Grant.

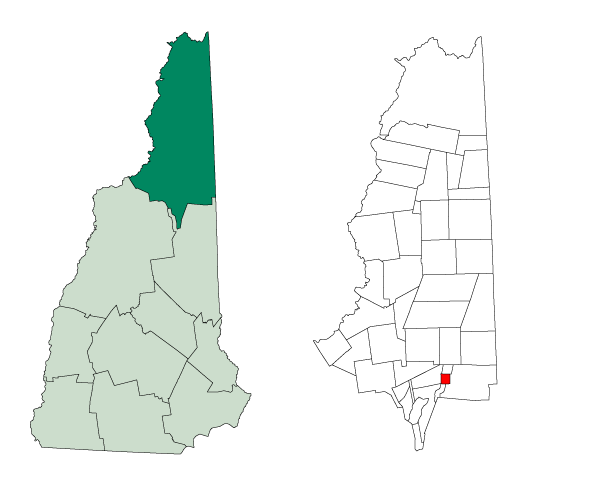
- Location in Coös County, New Hampshire
- Coordinates: 44°18′02″N 71°13′19″W
- Country: United States
- State: New Hampshire
- County: Coös

Area
  - Total: 3.67 sq mi (9.50 km^{2})
  - Land: 3.67 sq mi (9.50 km^{2})
  - Water: 0.0039 sq mi (0.01 km^{2}) 0.08%
- Elevation: 1,515 ft (462 m)

Population (2020)
  - Total: 0
- Time zone: UTC-5 (Eastern)
  - Summer (DST): UTC-4 (Eastern)
- ZIP code
- Area code: 603
- FIPS code: 33-007-31780
- GNIS feature ID: 871974

Green's Grant is a township in Coös County, New Hampshire, United States. The population of the grant was zero at the 2020 census, and an estimated 4 in 2025. The grant lies within the White Mountain National Forest. The base of the Mount Washington Auto Road is located in Green's Grant.

In New Hampshire, locations, grants, townships (which are different from towns), and purchases are unincorporated portions of a county which are not part of any town and have limited self-government (if any, as many are uninhabited).

== History ==
John Wentworth, British colonial governor of New Hampshire, made the grant to Lieutenant Francis Green of Boston, one of the last land grants that Wentworth made to soldiers of the French and Indian Wars.

== Geography ==
According to the United States Census Bureau, the grant has a total area of 3.7 square miles (9.5 km^{2}), of which 1.8 acres (7,256 m^{2}), or 0.08%, are covered by water. The Peabody River, a northward-flowing tributary of the Androscoggin River, runs through the center of the grant, joined by its tributaries, Nineteenmile Brook and Cowboy Brook from the east and the West Branch from the west. New Hampshire Route 16 follows the Peabody River through the grant, leading southward (upstream) to the height of land at Pinkham Notch in neighboring Pinkham's Grant and north to U.S. Route 2 in Gorham. The highest point in the grant is along its eastern boundary, on the lower slopes of Middle Carter Mountain, where the elevation reaches 2,540 feet (770 m) above sea level.

=== Adjacent municipalities ===
- Martin's Location (north)
- Bean's Purchase (east)
- Pinkham's Grant (south)
- Thompson and Meserve's Purchase (west)

== Demographics ==
Historical population
Census	Pop.	Note	%±
1860	14		—
1870	71		407.1%
1880	8		−88.7%
1890	30		275.0%
1900	13		−56.7%
1910	4		−69.2%
1920	5		25.0%
1930	4		−20.0%
1940	3		−25.0%
1950	0		−100.0%
1960	2		—
1970	0		−100.0%
1980	0		—
1990	0		—
2000	0		—
2010	1		—
2020	0		−100.0%
U.S. Decennial Census

As of the 2020 census, no people lived in the grant.
