= Pinkham's Grant, New Hampshire =

Township in Coos County, New Hampshire, United States

- Township
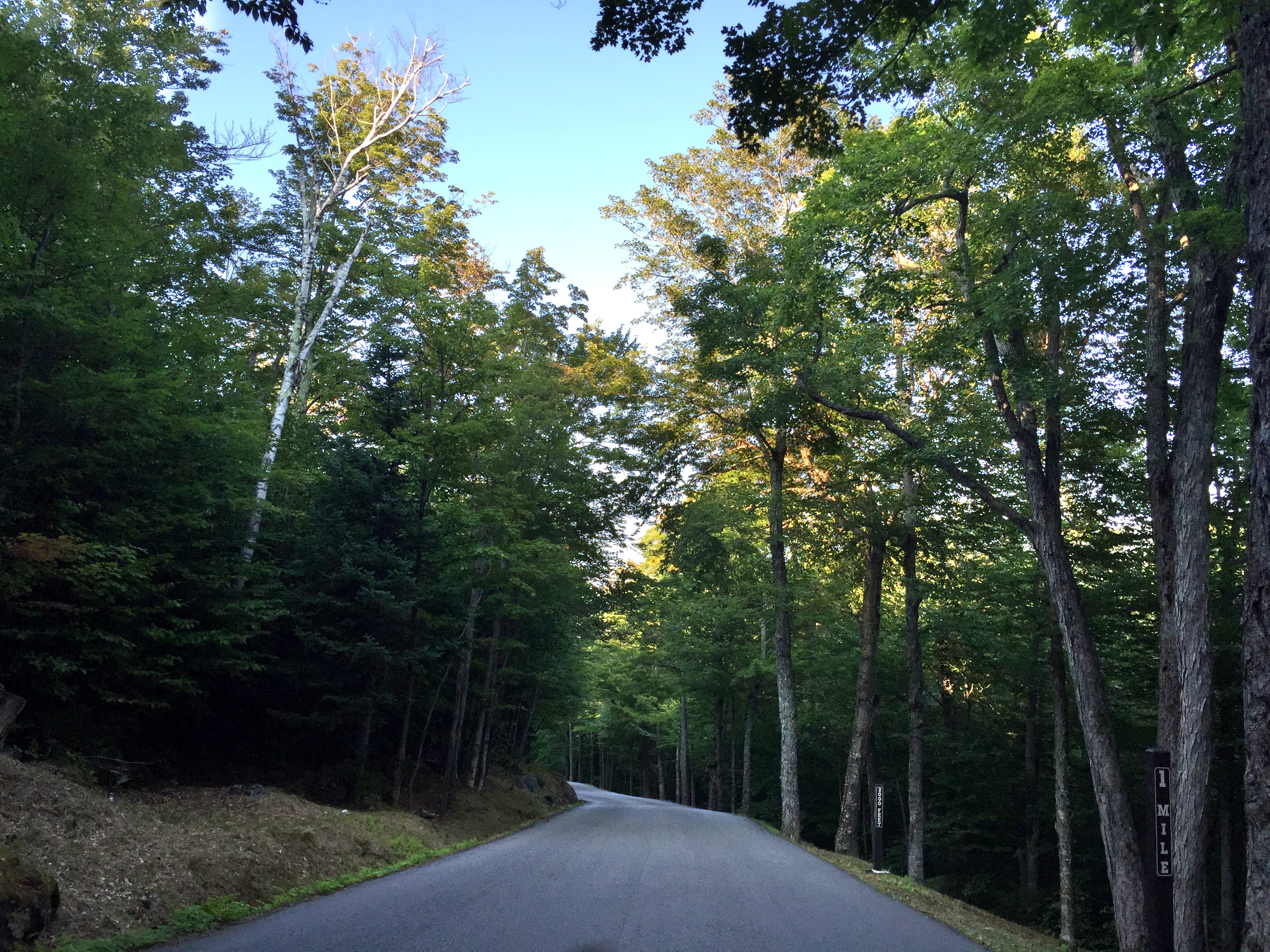
- A small portion of the Mount Washington Auto Road passes through Pinkham's Grant.

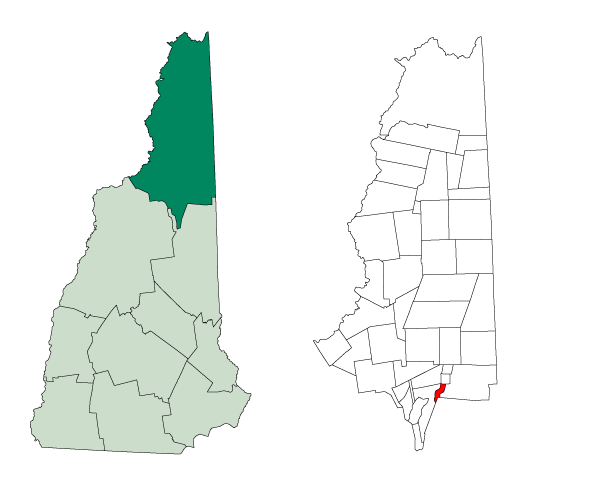
- Location in Coös County, New Hampshire
- Coordinates: 44°15′35″N 71°15′1″W
- Country: United States
- State: New Hampshire
- County: Coös

Area
  - Total: 3.80 sq mi (9.84 km^{2})
  - Land: 3.79 sq mi (9.82 km^{2})
  - Water: 0.0077 sq mi (0.02 km^{2}) 0.16%
- Elevation: 2,021 ft (616 m)

Population (2020)
  - Total: 0
- Time zone: UTC-5 (Eastern)
  - Summer (DST): UTC-4 (Eastern)
- Area code: 603
- FIPS code: 33-007-61620
- GNIS feature ID: 872509

Pinkham's Grant is a township in Coös County, New Hampshire, United States. The grant lies entirely within the White Mountain National Forest. As of the 2020 United States census, the population of the grant was zero.

In New Hampshire, locations, grants, townships (which are different from towns), and purchases are unincorporated portions of a county which are not part of any town and have limited self-government (if any, as many are uninhabited).

== Geography ==
The grant occupies the center of Pinkham Notch, a major pass in the White Mountains. The elevation at the height of land in the notch is 2,032 feet (619 m) above sea level, while the highest point in the grant is 3,050 feet (930 m), along Wildcat Ridge on the grant's eastern boundary. New Hampshire Route 16 passes through the grant as it traverses the notch; the highway leads north to Gorham and south to North Conway. The Appalachian Trail crosses the grant through Pinkham Notch.

According to the United States Census Bureau, the grant has a total area of 3.8 square miles (9.8 km^{2}), of which 0.01 square miles (0.02 km^{2}), or 0.16%, are water. The north side of the grant drains via the Peabody River to the Androscoggin River in Gorham, while the south side is drained by the Ellis River, which runs to the Saco River in Glen.

=== Adjacent municipalities ===
- Green's Grant (north)
- Bean's Purchase (east)
- Jackson (southeast)
- Sargent's Purchase (west)
- Thompson and Meserve's Purchase (northwest)

== Demographics ==
Historical population
| Census | Pop. | Note | %± |
|---|---|---|---|
| 1890 | 8 | | — |
| 1900 | 4 | | −50.0% |
| 1930 | 9 | | — |
| 1940 | 10 | | 11.1% |
| 1950 | 17 | | 70.0% |
| 1960 | 15 | | −11.8% |
| 1970 | 16 | | 6.7% |
| 1980 | 30 | | 87.5% |
| 1990 | 11 | | −63.3% |
| 2000 | 0 | | −100.0% |
| 2010 | 9 | | — |
| 2020 | 0 | | −100.0% |
U.S. Decennial Census

As of the 2020 census, there were no people living in the grant.

== Recreation ==
The Appalachian Mountain Club's Pinkham Notch Visitor Center in the center of the grant is a popular starting point for hikes up Mount Washington to the west and up Wildcat Mountain to the east. The base of Wildcat Mountain Ski Area is in the eastern part of the grant. A short stretch of the Mount Washington Auto Road, which begins at Glen House in neighboring Green's Grant, passes through the northwestern corner of Pinkham's Grant.
