= West Branch Peabody River =

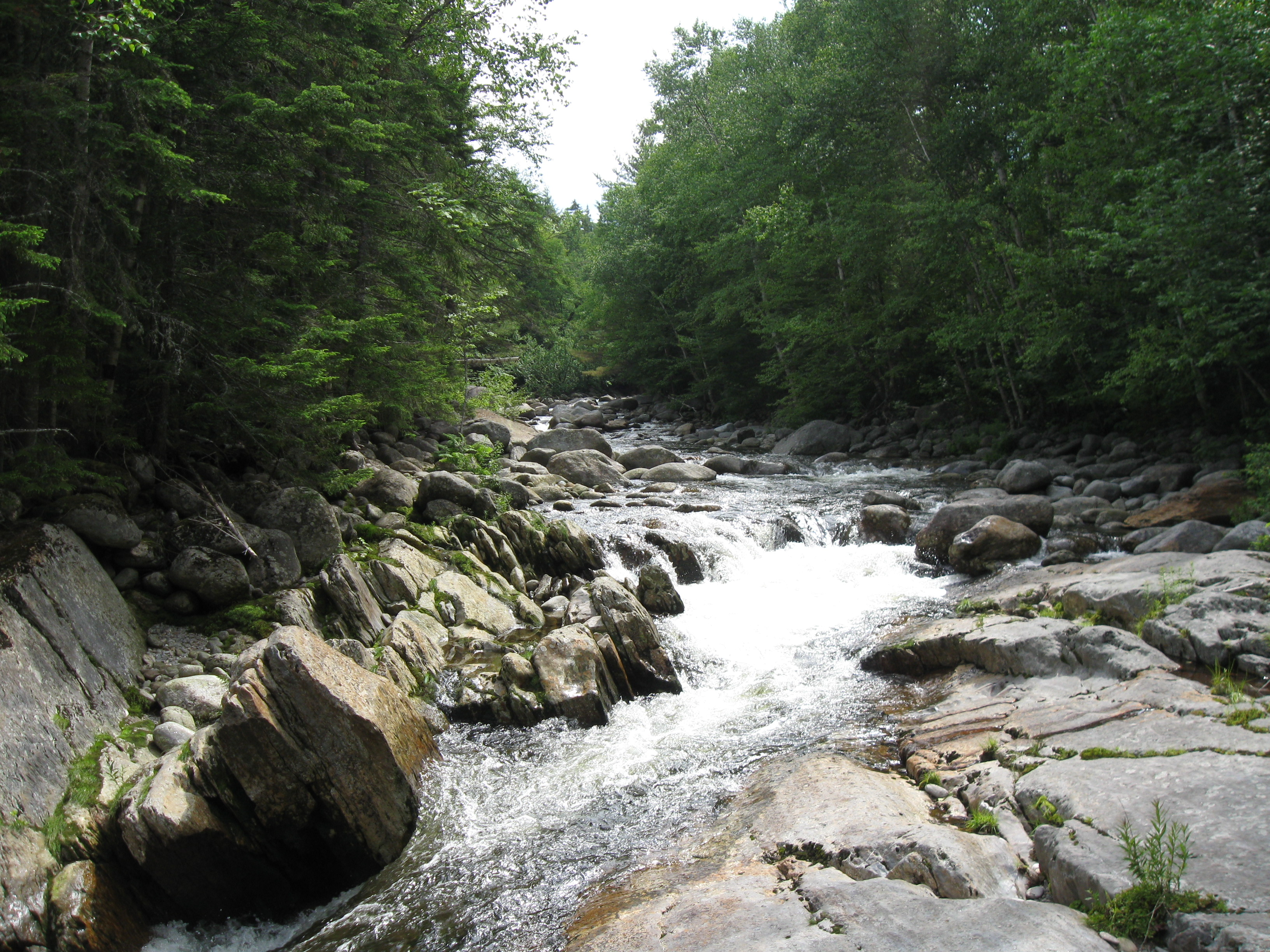
- The West Branch near its confluence with the Peabody River

- Location within New Hampshire Location within the United States

Location
- Country: United States
- State: New Hampshire
- County: Coos
- Townships: Thompson & Meserves Purchase, Greens Grant

Physical characteristics
- Source: Spaulding Lake (Great Gulf)
  - location: Thompson & Meserves Purchase
  - coordinates: 44°17′4″N 71°18′29″W
  - elevation: 4,232 ft (1,290 m)
- Mouth: Peabody River
  - location: Greens Grant
  - coordinates: 44°18′39″N 71°13′17″W
  - elevation: 1,340 ft (410 m)
- Length: 5.8 mi (9.3 km)

Basin features
- Tributaries
  - left: Parapet Brook
  - right: Chandler Brook

The West Branch of the Peabody River is a 5.8-mile-long (9.3 km) river in the White Mountains of New Hampshire in the United States. It is a tributary of the Peabody River, which flows into the Androscoggin River, which in turn flows east and south into Maine, joining the Kennebec River near the Atlantic Ocean. The West Branch of the Peabody is within the Great Gulf Wilderness of the White Mountain National Forest for most of its length. It is paralleled by the Great Gulf Trail, a popular route for backpackers.

The stream rises in Great Gulf, a large glacial cirque on the northern side of Mount Washington. The West Branch flows from the outlet of Spaulding Lake, a tarn seated at the foot of the east face of Mount Clay, and proceeds northeast deeper into the gulf, with Mount Jefferson of the Presidential Range to the west and Chandlers Ridge, a northern spur of Mount Washington, to the east. Upon reaching the outlet of Jefferson Ravine, the river turns east, with Mount Adams and Mount Madison rising above its northern bank.

The river ends at the Peabody River, 1.5 miles (2.4 km) north (downstream) of Glen House, the entrance to the Mount Washington Auto Road.

== See also ==
- List of rivers of New Hampshire
