= Darby Field =

First European to climb Mount Washington, New Hampshire (1610–1649)

- Born: 1610; Boston, Lincolnshire, England
- Died: 1649 (aged 38–39); Dover, New Hampshire, British America
- Occupation: Ferry master
- Known for: First European to climb Mount Washington, New Hampshire
- Spouse: Agnes
- Children: 5

Darby Field (1610–1649) was the first European to climb Mount Washington in New Hampshire.

== Biography ==
Of English ancestry, Field was born in Boston, Lincolnshire, England. His father was John Field of London. By 1636, he immigrated to Boston, Massachusetts, and settled in Durham, New Hampshire, by 1638, where he ran a ferry from what is now called Durham Point to the town of Newington, across Little Bay. He was known as an Indian translator.

In 1639, Field signed the Exeter Combination, an agreement establishing civil government among settlers in the Exeter area. At the time, he was living at Oyster River Point, which was them claimed as part of Exeter.

Field's ascent of Mount Washington, in 1642, when he was about 32 years of age, was recorded by Governor John Winthrop of the Massachusetts Bay Colony in his journal:

"One Darby Field, an Irishman, living about Piscataquack, being accompanied with two Indians, went to the top of the white hill. He made his journey in 18 days. His relation at his return was, that it was about one hundred miles from Saco, that after 40 miles travel, he did, for the most part, ascend; and within 12 miles of the top was neither tree nor grass, but low savins [shrubs], which they went upon the top of sometimes, but a continual ascent upon rocks, on a ridge between two valleys filled with snow, out of which came two branches of Saco river, which met at the foot of the hill where was an Indian town of some 200 people. Some of them accompanied him within 8 miles of the top, but durst go no further, telling him that no Indian ever dared to go higher, and that he would die if he went. So they staid there till his return, and his two Indians took courage by his example and went with him. They went divers times through the thick clouds for a good space, and within 4 miles of the top, they had no clouds but very cold. By the way among the rocks, there were two ponds, one a blackish water, and the other reddish [the Lakes of the Clouds]. The top of all was plain about 60 feet square. On the north side was such a precipice [the Great Gulf], as they could scarcely discern to the bottom. They had neither cloud nor wind on the top, and moderate heat. All the country about him seemed a level, except here and there a hill rising above the rest, and far beneath them. He saw to the north, a great water which he judged to be 100 miles broad, but could see no land beyond it."

Darby Field was remarkably accurate in the estimated distances, though the distant bodies of water were likely cloud-banks, and his description of the top of Mount Washington was likewise accurate. Field's feat was repeated only a handful of times over the next 150 years.

The account of a party of hikers in 1816 shows that they followed Darby Field's notes as a guide and simply saw him as overenthusiastic at the summit; "The relation of Darby field, may be considered as in the main correct, after making reasonable deductions for the distance, the length of the Muscovy glass, and the quantity of water in view, which it may be suspected has not been seen by any visitor since his time." At that time, mica (Muscovy glass) was used in the manufacturing of stoves and was quite an expensive commodity.

Darby Field and his wife Agnes had five children before his death in 1649 at Dover, New Hampshire.

Mount Field in the Willey Range of the White Mountains is named in his honor. Field is featured on a New Hampshire historical marker (number 11) along New Hampshire Route 16 in Pinkham's Grant.

== Sources ==
- Passaconaway's Realm by Russell M. Lawson, University Press of New England, Hanover NH 2002.
