= Thompson and Meserve's Purchase, New Hampshire =

Township in Coos County, New Hampshire, United States

- Township
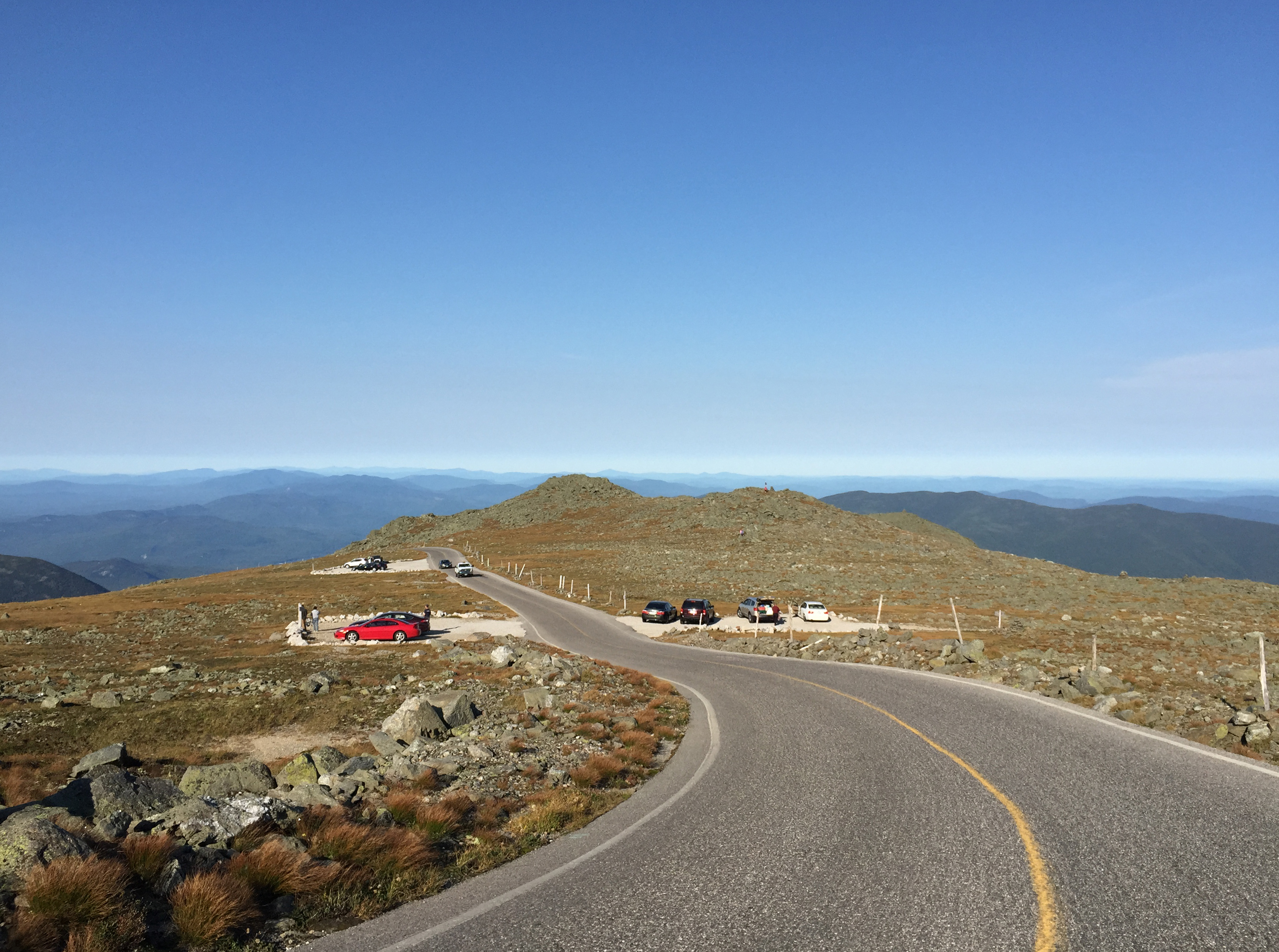
- A large portion of the Mount Washington Auto Road passes through the township.

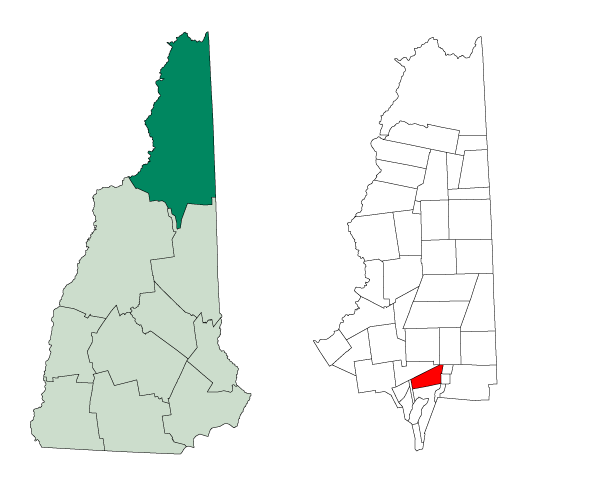
- Location in Coös County, New Hampshire
- Coordinates: 44°18′1″N 71°17′23″W
- Country: United States
- State: New Hampshire
- County: Coös

Area
  - Total: 18.5 sq mi (48.0 km^{2})
  - Land: 18.5 sq mi (48.0 km^{2})
  - Water: 0 sq mi (0.0 km^{2}) 0%
- Elevation: 3,179 ft (969 m)

Population (2020)
  - Total: 1
- Time zone: UTC-5 (Eastern)
  - Summer (DST): UTC-4 (Eastern)
- Area code: 603
- FIPS code: 33-007-76580
- GNIS feature ID: 872800

Thompson and Meserve's Purchase is a township in Coös County, New Hampshire, United States. The purchase lies entirely within the White Mountain National Forest. As of the 2020 census, the population of the purchase was one.

In New Hampshire, locations, grants, townships (which are different from towns), and purchases are unincorporated portions of a county which are not part of any town and have limited self-government (if any, as many are uninhabited).

Thompson and Meserve's Purchase is notable for encompassing the northern slope of Mount Washington, including a large portion of the Mount Washington Auto Road and Cog Railway.

== History ==
Thompson and Meserve's Purchase was sold by Commissioner Willey to Samuel W. Thompson of Conway and George P. Meserve of Jackson, New Hampshire, in 1835 for $500.

== Geography ==
The purchase is situated just north of the summit of Mount Washington and includes some of the Presidential Range, including Mount Adams, the second highest mountain in New Hampshire at 5,774 feet (1,760 m), and Mount Jefferson, the third highest peak at 5,712 feet (1,741 m). The highest point in the purchase is 6,000 feet (1,800 m) above sea level on the slope of Chandler Ridge, just north of the summit of Mount Washington. To the east of the Presidential peaks lies the Great Gulf, a deep glacial cirque. The Appalachian Trail crosses the purchase, close to the crest of the Presidential Range.

According to the United States Census Bureau, the purchase has a total area of 18.5 square miles (48.0 km^{2}), of which 0.3 acres (1,239 m^{2}), or 0.003%, are water. The west side of the purchase is drained by the headwaters of the Ammonoosuc River, including its tributaries Clay Brook and Jefferson Brook, while the northwest corner of the purchase is drained by streams that flow north to the Israel River. Both the Ammonoosuc and the Israel River are part of the Connecticut River watershed. The east side of the purchase is drained by the West Branch of the Peabody River, coming out of the Great Gulf and part of the Androscoggin River watershed.

== Demographics ==
Historical population
Census	Pop.	Note	%±
1860	32		—
1900	18		—
1910	4		−77.8%
1930	2		—
1940	0		−100.0%
1950	2		—
1960	1		−50.0%
1970	0		−100.0%
1980	2		—
1990	0		−100.0%
2000	0		—
2010	0		—
2020	1		—
U.S. Decennial Census

As of the 2020 census, there was one person recorded to be living in the purchase.
