= Mount Washington Auto Road =

Toll road in New Hampshire, U.S.

Coordinates: 44°17′17.07″N 71°16′45.37″W

Route information
- Length: 7.6 mi (12.2 km)
- Existed: 1861–present

Major junctions
- East end: NH 16 in Green's Grant
- West end: Mount Washington summit

Location
- Country: United States
- State: New Hampshire
- Counties: Coos

Highway system
- New Hampshire Highway System; Interstate; US; State; Turnpikes

The Mount Washington Auto Road—originally the Mount Washington Carriage Road—is a 7.6 mi (12.2 km) private toll road in southern Coos County, New Hampshire that extends from New Hampshire Route 16 in Green's Grant, just north of Pinkham Notch, westward across Pinkham's Grant and Thompson and Meserve's Purchase to the summit of Mount Washington in the White Mountains of the US state of New Hampshire. The road climbs 4,618 ft (1,408 m) from an altitude of 1,527 ft (465 m) at the bottom to 6,145 ft (1,873 m) at the top, an average gradient of 11.6%. The road was completed and opened to the public in 1861.

== Operations ==
Official logo of the Mount Washington Auto Road

The Auto Road may be traversed by private vehicles, and there are also guided tours in vans, called stages. Toll payment for a private car receives a "This car climbed Mt. Washington" bumper sticker. No bicycles are allowed on the road, except for participants during specific bicycle events.

== Weather sensors ==
The road has a series of sensors located at various altitudes along it. The sensors transmit weather data via a solar-powered radio link.

== Events ==
The oldest auto race in the United States, the Mount Washington Hillclimb Auto Race, was hosted on the auto road in 1904.

Every year in June, the mountain road is host to the Mount Washington Road Race, an event which attracts hundreds of runners.

In July, the mountain road hosts Newton's Revenge, and in August the Mount Washington Auto Road Bicycle Hillclimb, both of which are bicycle races that run the same route as the road race. The hillclimb's most notable victor to date has been former Tour de France contender Tyler Hamilton. The climb is regarded as one of the world's toughest for cyclists—it features a greater altitude gain, and is steeper, than the Mortirolo Pass, the Monte Zoncolan, and the Alto de El Angliru, and is far steeper than any of the famous climbs featured in the Tour de France.

Another event, although not a race, is the annual MINIs On Top event. Now in its twelfth year, the drive to the summit began with 73 BMW MINI Cooper and Cooper S vehicles and now exceeds 200 cars. The only reason more MINIs do not drive to the summit is the fact there is not enough space to hold all the cars, despite their diminutive size. MINIs On Top (or MOT) is held the Saturday of Father's Day weekend every June.

== Climate ==
This climate table contains interpolated data for the 1991–2020 data normals for the summit of Mount Washington Auto Road. The road summit has a subarctic climate (Köppen Dfc), closely bordering on a tundra climate (Köppen ET).

Climate data for Mount Washington Road Summit 44.2713 N, 71.3003 W, Elevation: 5,866 ft (1,788 m) (1991–2020 normals)
Month	Jan	Feb	Mar	Apr	May	Jun	Jul	Aug	Sep	Oct	Nov	Dec	Year
Mean daily maximum °F (°C)	14.7 (−9.6)	14.4 (−9.8)	20.4 (−6.4)	30.3 (−0.9)	42.6 (5.9)	51.4 (10.8)	55.9 (13.3)	54.5 (12.5)	49.5 (9.7)	38.0 (3.3)	28.3 (−2.1)	20.3 (−6.5)	35.0 (1.7)
Daily mean °F (°C)	6.6 (−14.1)	6.6 (−14.1)	13.3 (−10.4)	24.2 (−4.3)	37.3 (2.9)	46.6 (8.1)	51.5 (10.8)	50.1 (10.1)	44.5 (6.9)	32.5 (0.3)	22.0 (−5.6)	12.9 (−10.6)	29.0 (−1.7)
Mean daily minimum °F (°C)	−1.5 (−18.6)	−1.3 (−18.5)	6.2 (−14.3)	18.2 (−7.7)	32.0 (0.0)	41.9 (5.5)	47.2 (8.4)	45.8 (7.7)	39.5 (4.2)	27.1 (−2.7)	15.7 (−9.1)	5.5 (−14.7)	23.0 (−5.0)
Average precipitation inches (mm)	5.60 (142)	5.34 (136)	6.71 (170)	7.38 (187)	7.25 (184)	8.59 (218)	9.03 (229)	7.31 (186)	7.40 (188)	10.23 (260)	8.19 (208)	7.47 (190)	90.5 (2,298)
Source: PRISM Climate Group

== Gallery ==
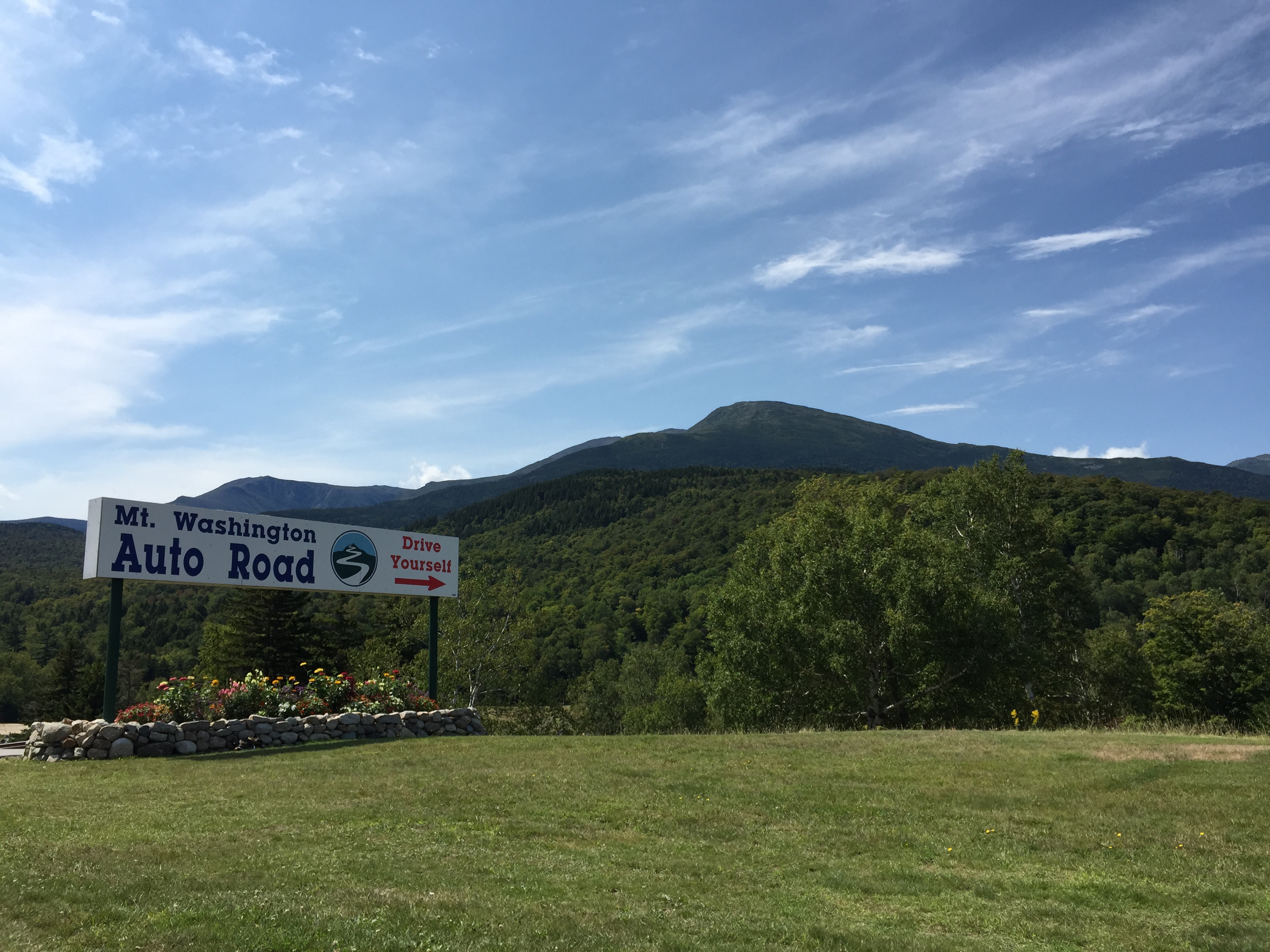
Sign at the bottom of the road, with Mount Washington visible ahead

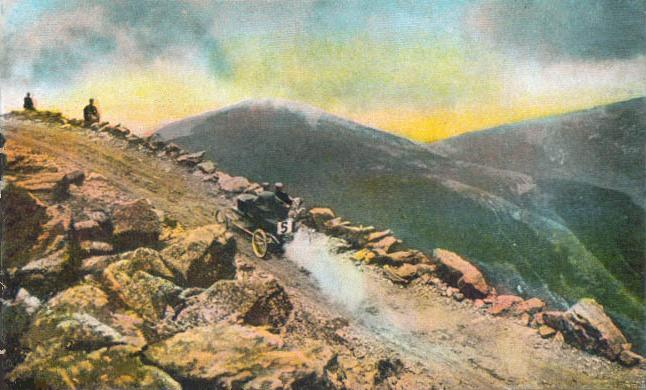
Fred Marriott in a Stanley Steamer during the 1905 Climb to the Clouds

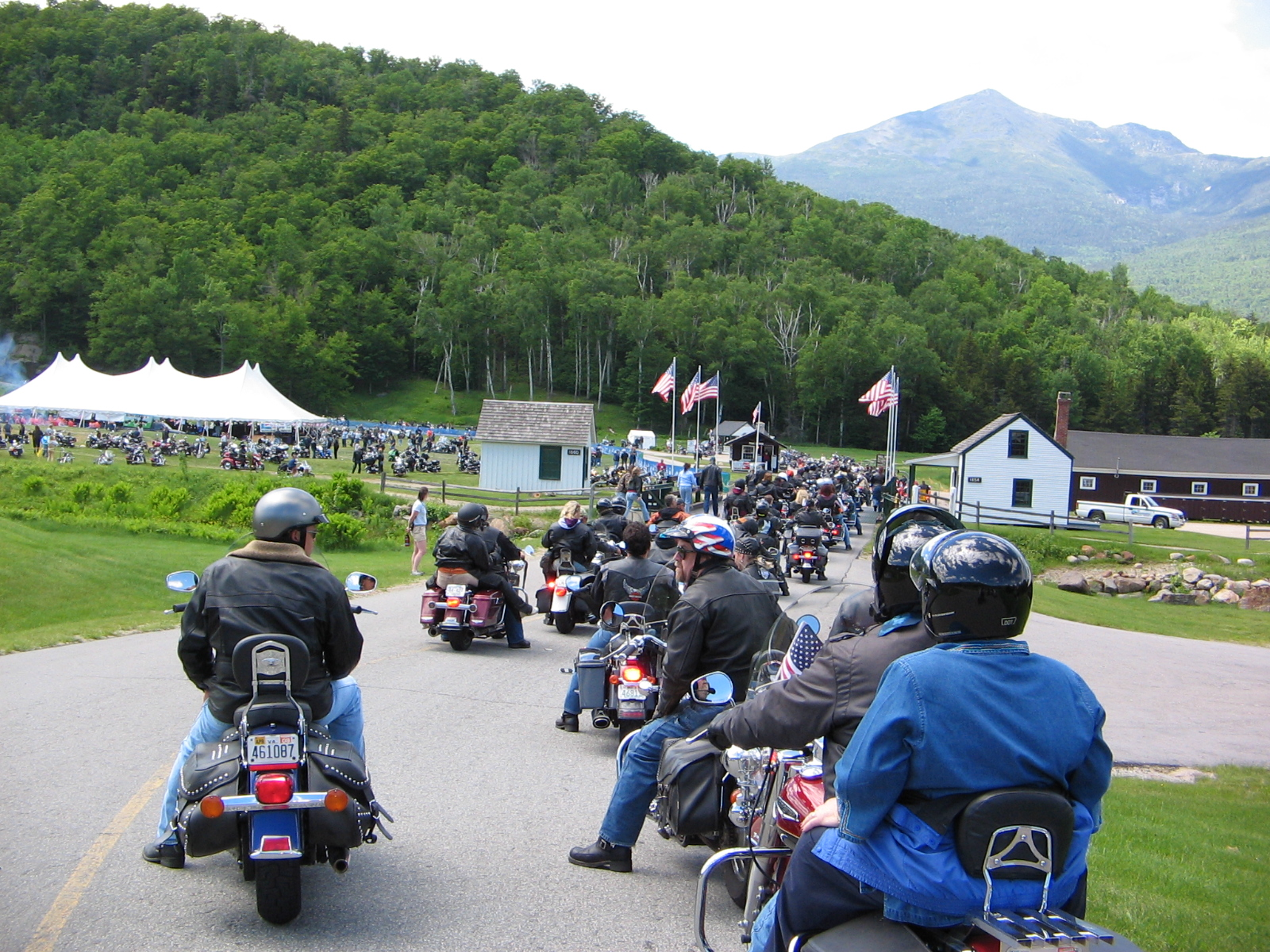
Entrance to the Mount Washington Auto road

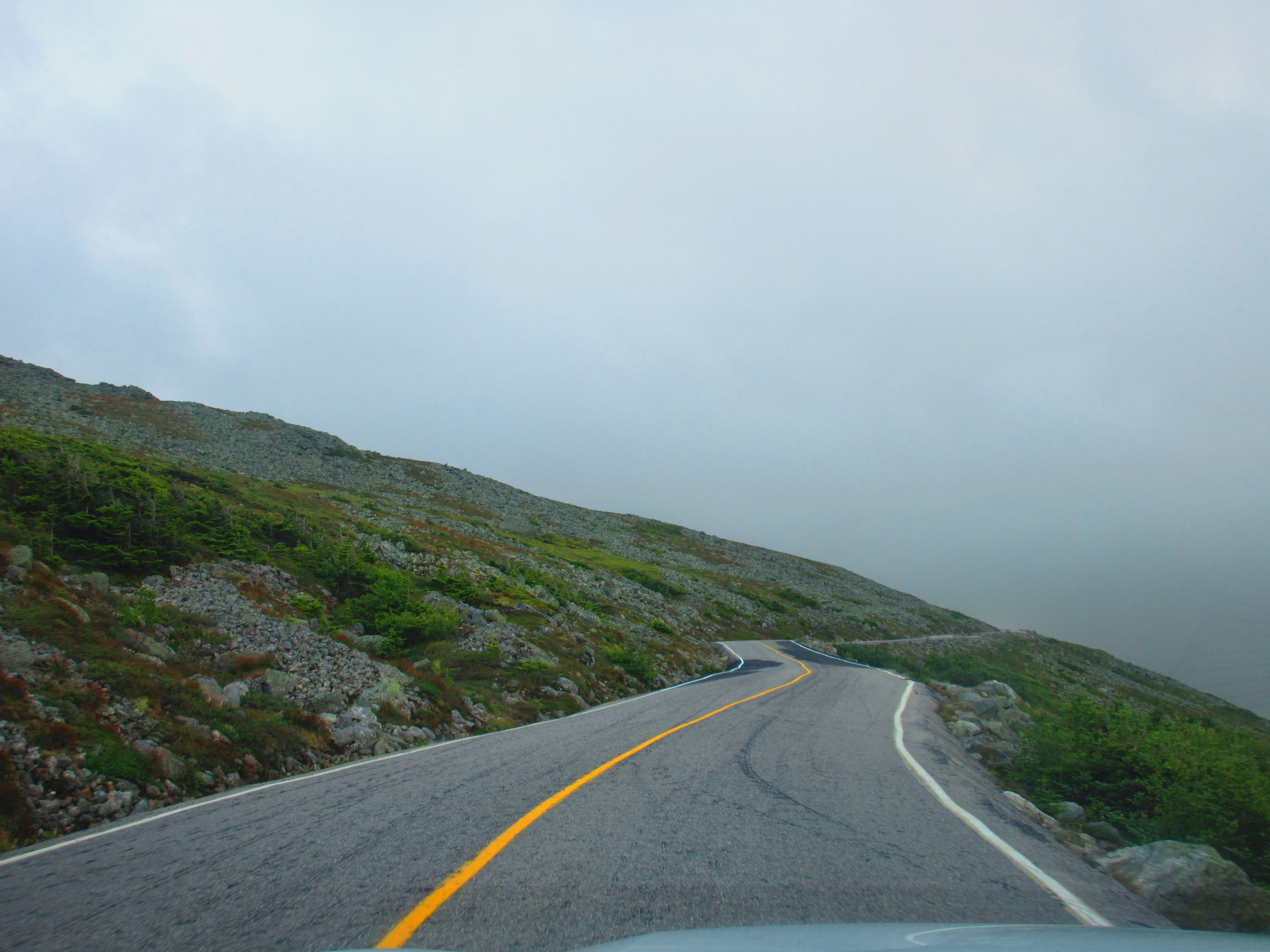
View along the roadway.

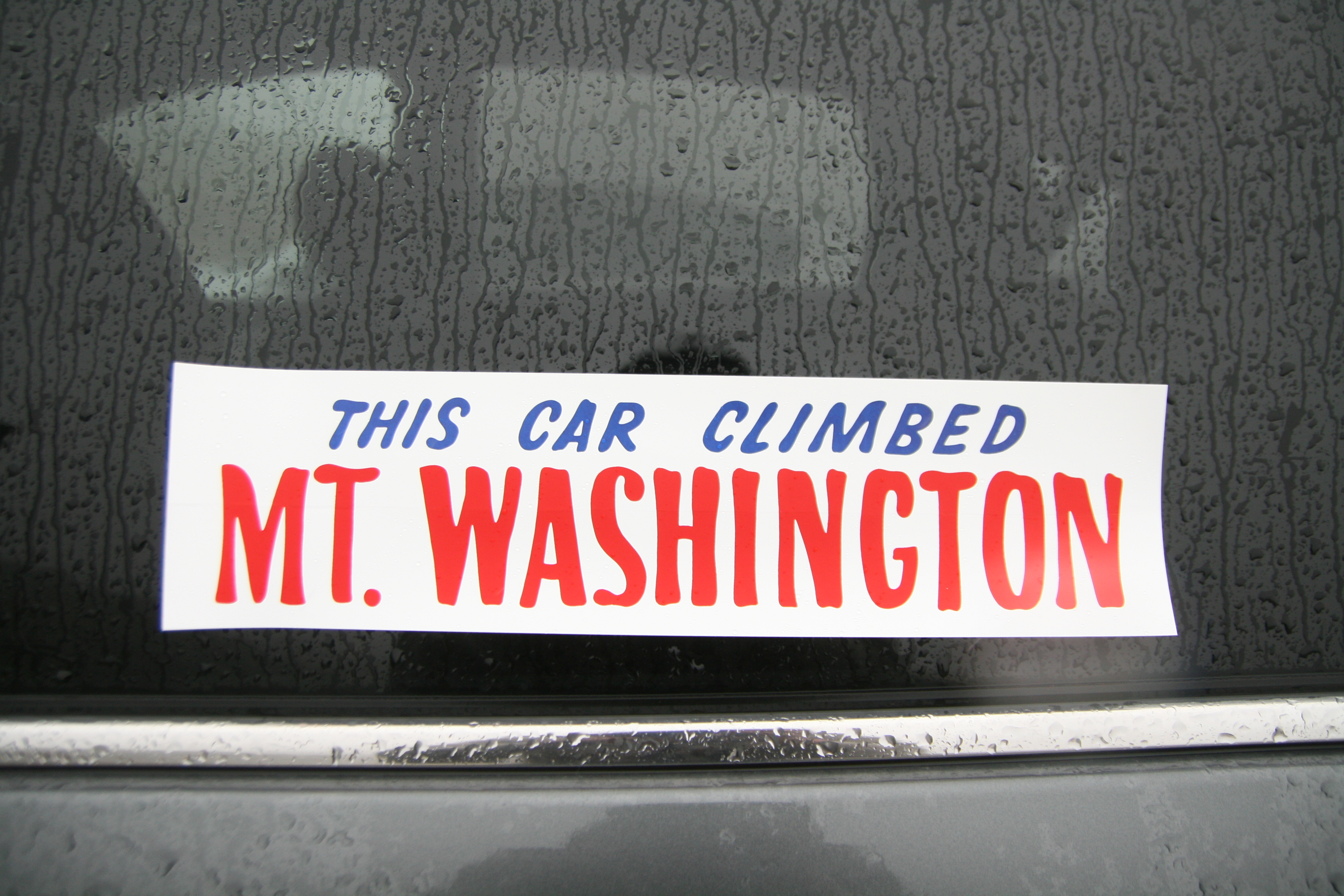
Mount Washington bumper sticker
