= Great Gulf =

Glacial cirque in New Hampshire, United States

Coordinates: 44°17′24″N 71°18′12″W

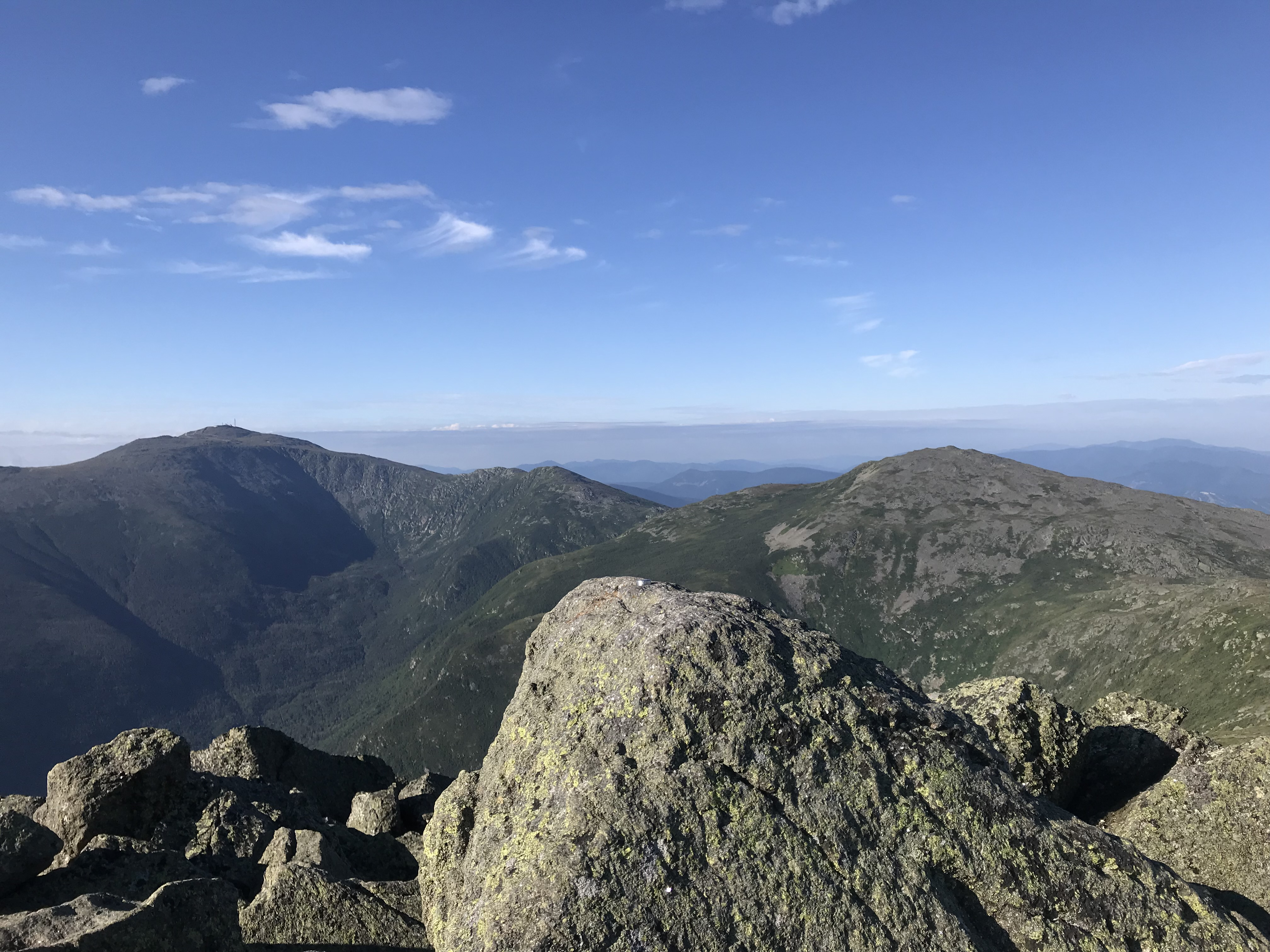
Photo taken from Mount Adams showing the Great Gulf separating it from Mount Washington (on the left).

The Great Gulf is a glacial cirque, or amphitheater-like valley head formed from a glacier by erosion, located in the White Mountains of New Hampshire. The cirque's walls are formed, from south to north, by the mountainsides of Mount Washington (6,288 ft; 1,917 m), Mount Clay (5,533 ft; 1,686 m), Mount Jefferson (5,716 ft; 1,742 m), Mount Adams (5,799 ft; 1,768 m), and Mount Madison (5,366 ft; 1,636 m). It is drained by the West Branch of the Peabody River.

The Great Gulf Wilderness is a protected wilderness area encompassing the cirque of the Great Gulf, and is part of the National Wilderness Preservation System. Established in 1964, Great Gulf is New Hampshire's oldest and smallest wilderness area, comprising just 5,552 acres (22.47 km^{2}).

== See also ==
- List of U.S. Wilderness Areas
- Wilderness Act
