= Peabody River =

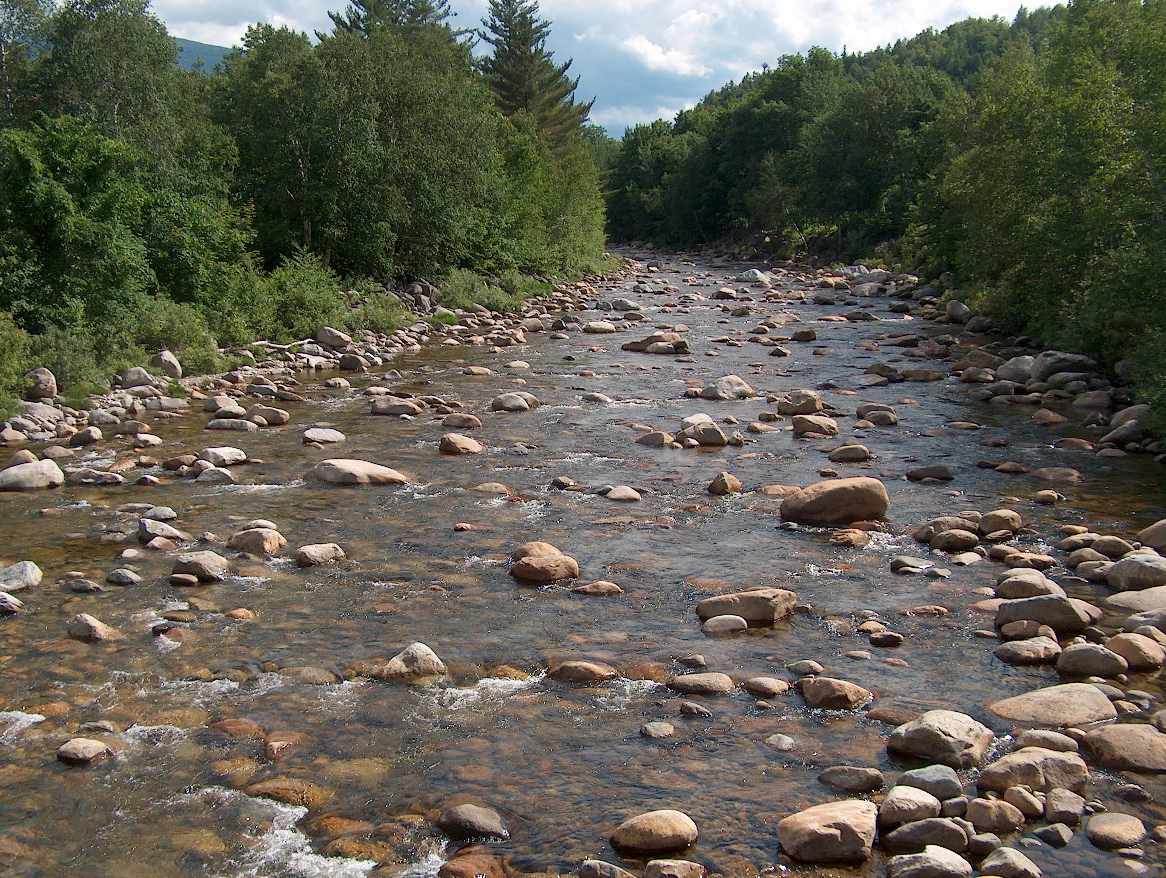
- The Peabody River flowing through Gorham, New Hampshire

- Location within New Hampshire Location within the United States

Location
- Country: United States
- State: New Hampshire
- County: Coos
- Town: Gorham

Physical characteristics
- Source: Mount Washington
  - location: Sargent's Purchase
  - coordinates: 44°16′35″N 71°16′0″W
  - elevation: 3,720 ft (1,134 m)
- Mouth: Androscoggin River
  - location: Gorham
  - coordinates: 44°23′24″N 71°9′38″W
  - elevation: 750 ft (230 m)
- Length: 12.9 mi (20.8 km)

Basin features
- Tributaries
  - left: West Branch, Culhane Brook, Barnes Brook, Bear Spring Brook
  - right: Thompson Brook, Nineteenmile Brook, Cowboy Brook, Imp Brook, Townline Brook, Clay Brook, Stony Brook

The Peabody River is a 12.9-mile-long (20.8 km) river in the White Mountains of New Hampshire in the United States. It is a tributary of the Androscoggin River, which flows south and east into Maine, joining the Kennebec River near the Atlantic Ocean.

The Peabody River rises in Pinkham Notch, on the eastern slopes of Mount Washington. The river flows northeast to the Androscoggin River in Gorham, New Hampshire, collecting tributaries from the Presidential Range to the west and the Carter-Moriah Range to the east. Its most significant tributary is the West Branch of the Peabody River, emerging from Great Gulf, a deep and long glacial cirque surrounded by the peaks of the Presidential Range.

New Hampshire Route 16 follows the Peabody River for most of the river's length.

== See also ==
- List of rivers of New Hampshire
