= Mount Washington =

Highest mountain in the Northeastern US

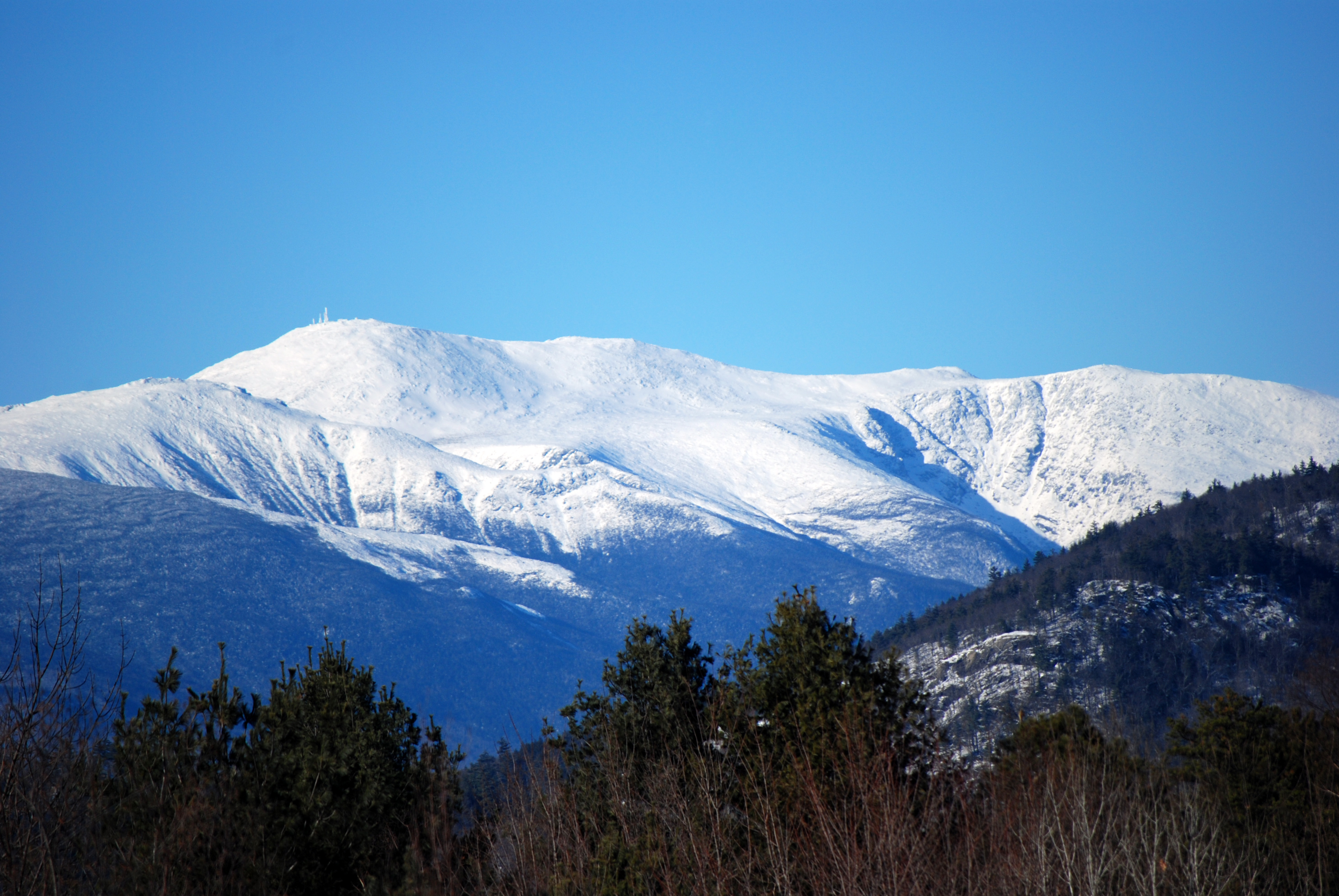
- Mount Washington from Intervale

Highest point
- Elevation: 6,288.3 ft (1,916.7 m) NAVD 88
- Prominence: 6,148 ft (1,874 m)
- Listing: U.S. most isolated peaks 6th; U.S. most prominent peaks 59th; U.S. state high point 18th; New England Fifty Finest 1st; White Mountain 4000-footers 1st; Ultra prominent peak
- Coordinates: 44°16′13.8″N 71°18′11.7″W

Geography
- Location within New Hampshire Location within the United States
- Location: Sargent's Purchase; Coös County; New Hampshire, U.S.
- Parent range: Presidential Range
- Topo map: USGS Mount Washington

Climbing
- First ascent: 1642 (first recorded)
- Easiest route: Hike, ride cog railway, or drive via Mount Washington Auto Road.

Mount Washington (Abenaki: Agiocochook) is an ultra-prominent mountain in the state of New Hampshire. It is the highest peak in the Northeastern United States at 6,288.2 ft (1,916.6 m) and the most topographically prominent mountain east of the Mississippi River.

The mountain is notorious for its erratic weather. On the afternoon of April 12, 1934, the Mount Washington Observatory recorded a windspeed of 231 mph (372 km/h) at the summit, the world record from 1934 until 1996. Mount Washington still holds the record for the highest measured wind speed not associated with a tornado or tropical cyclone. (Note: The current official record gust of 254 miles per hour (409 km/h) was measured at Barrow Island, Australia, on October 4, 1996, although uncertified records as high as 318 mph (512 km/h) exist.)

The mountain is located in the Presidential Range of the White Mountains, in Coös County, New Hampshire. The mountain is in several unincorporated townships, with the summit in the township of Sargent's Purchase. While nearly the whole mountain is in the White Mountain National Forest, an area of 60.3 acres (24.4 ha) surrounding and including the summit is designated as Mount Washington State Park.

The Mount Washington Cog Railway ascends the western slope of the mountain, and the Mount Washington Auto Road climbs to the summit from the east. The mountain is visited by hikers from various approaches, including the Appalachian Trail, which traverses the summit. Other common activities include glider flying, backcountry skiing, and annual cycle and running races such as the Auto Road Bicycle Hillclimb and Road Race.

== History ==
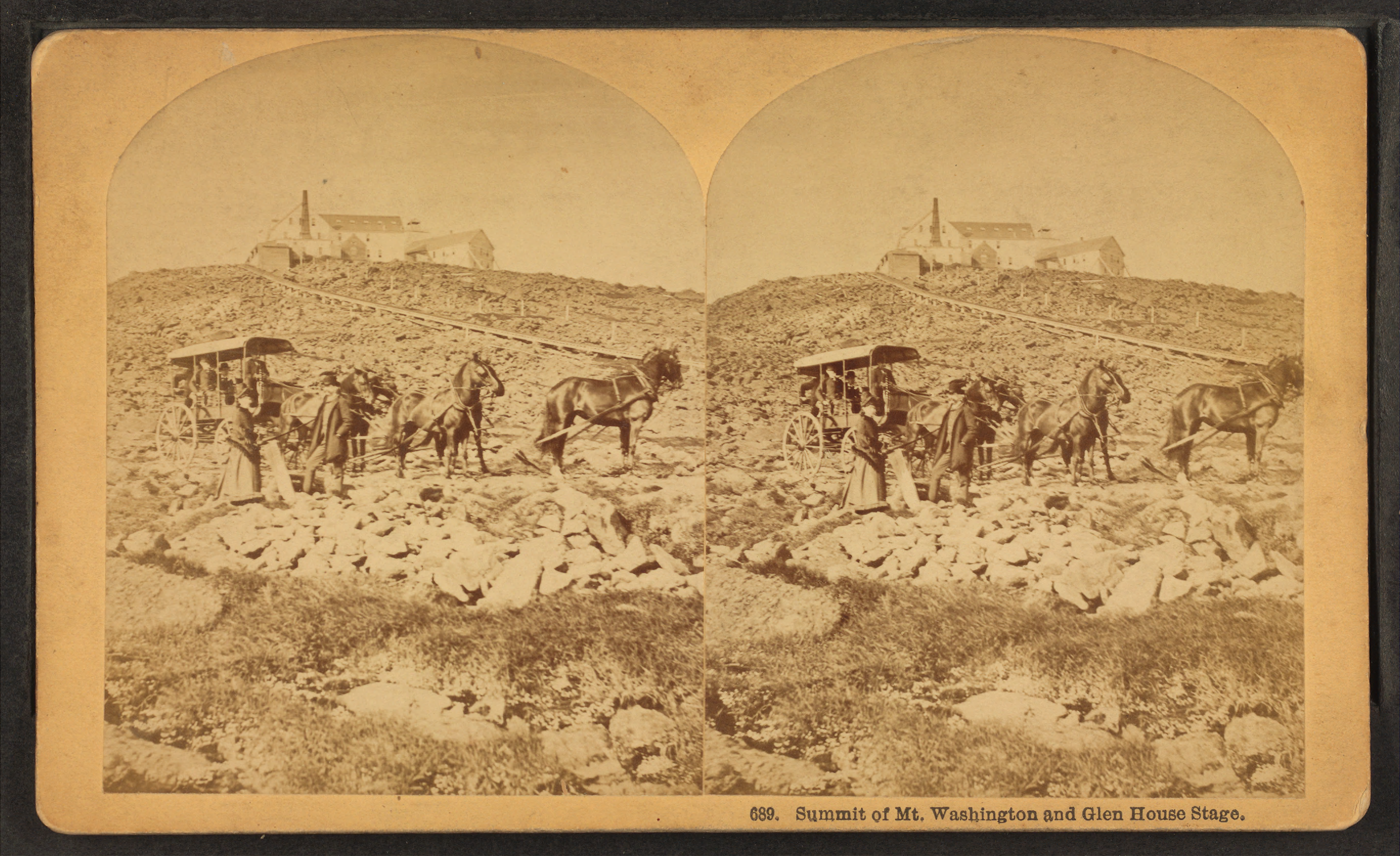
Stereoscopic photograph of the summit of Mount Washington and the Glen House stage coach by Kilburn Brothers (circa 1872). The cog railway line is visible in the background along with the Summit House atop the peak.

Before European settlers arrived in the region, the mountain was known by various indigenous peoples as Kodaak Wadjo (Western Abnaki: Kôttak-Wajo, lit. 'so-hidden mountain', IPA: [kɔ̃t.tɑk wɑd͡zʊ]) or Agiochook or Agiocochook ("the place of the Great Spirit" or "the place of the Concealed One"). The Algonquians called the summit Waumbik, "white rocks". The Abenaki people inhabiting the region at the time of European contact believed that the tops of mountains were the dwelling place of the gods and did not climb them out of religious deference to their sanctity.

In 1524, Giovanni da Verrazzano became the first European to mention the mountain. Viewing it from the Atlantic Ocean, he described what he saw as "high interior mountains".

In 1642, Darby Field claimed to have made the first ascent of the mountain. Field climbed the mountain in June of that year to demonstrate to the Abenaki chief Passaconaway that the Europeans bargaining for tribal land were not subject to the gods believed to inhabit the summit, a primarily political move that facilitated colonists' northern expansion. Field again summited Agiocochook in October 1642 on an early surveying expedition that created maps of land as far as Maine, which allowed people from the Massachusetts colony to identify arable coastal areas.

Manasseh Cutler, the leader of a 1784 geological survey expedition, may have first named the mountain after George Washington. The earliest known map to display the name "Mount Washington" was published in 1796.

In 1819, the Crawford Path was established from Crawford Notch to the summit. It is the oldest continuously maintained hiking path in the United States. Abel Crawford led a group that included several Harvard students on the first recorded ascent of the path on September 10, 1819. Among them were Samuel Joseph May, George B. Emerson, Samuel E. Sewall, Caleb Cushing, Joseph Coolidge, William Ware and Joseph G. Moody.

On August 31, 1821, Eliza, Harriet, and Abigail Austin, three sisters from Jefferson, New Hampshire, became the first women recorded to set foot atop Mount Washington.

In 1821, Ethan Allen Crawford built a house on the summit. The house lasted until a storm in 1826.

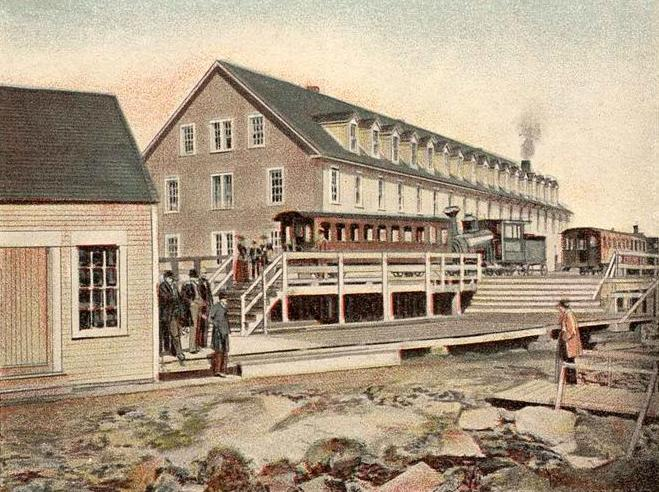
The second Summit House (1904)

Little occurred on the summit itself until the mid-19th century, when it was developed into one of the first tourist destinations in the nation, with construction of more bridle paths and two hotels. The Summit House opened in 1852, a 64-foot-long (20 m) stone hotel anchored by four heavy chains over its roof. In 1853, the Tip-Top House was erected to compete. Rebuilt of wood with 91 rooms in 1872–1873, the Summit House burned in 1908, then was replaced in granite in 1915. The Tip-Top House alone survived the fire; today it is a state historic site, recently renovated for exhibits. Other Victorian era tourist attractions include a coach road (1861)—now the Mount Washington Auto Road—and the Mount Washington Cog Railway (1869), both of which are still in operation.

For forty years, until 1917, an intermittent daily newspaper, called Among the Clouds, was published by Henry M. Burt at the summit each summer.

In 2011 and 2012, Orlando, Florida–based CNL Financial Group, which at the time operated the Mount Washington Hotel at the foot of the mountain, trademarked the "Mount Washington" name when used with a resort or hotel. CNL officials said they were directing their efforts only against hotels and not the numerous businesses in the area that use the name. CNL's application at the U.S. Patent and Trademark Office seeks registration of the trademark "Mount Washington" for any retail service, any restaurant service, and any entertainment service.

== Climate ==
Mount Washington

Climate chart (precipitation, max. and min. temperature)
| J | F | M | A | M | J | J | A | S | O | N | D |
| 6.4 14 −4 | 6.8 15 −2 | 7.7 21 5 | 7.4 30 17 | 8.2 41 30 | 8.4 50 40 | 8.8 54 44 | 8.3 53 43 | 8 47 36 | 9.3 36 24 | 9.9 28 13 | 7.7 18 2 |
- █ Average max. and min. temperatures in °F
- █ Precipitation totals in inches
- Source: NOAA
Metric conversion
| J | F | M | A | M | J | J | A | S | O | N | D |
| 164 −10 −20 | 172 −10 −19 | 195 −6 −15 | 189 −1 −8 | 208 5 −1 | 213 10 4 | 223 12 7 | 211 12 6 | 204 8 2 | 235 2 −4 | 250 −2 −10 | 196 −8 −17 |
- █ Average max. and min. temperatures in °C
- █ Precipitation totals in mm

The summit station of Mount Washington has an alpine climate or tundra climate (Köppen ETH), although it receives an extremely high amount of precipitation, atypical for most regions with such cold weather. However, elevations just beneath treeline have a subalpine climate (Köppen Dfc) which eventually transitions to a humid continental climate (Köppen Dfb) near the mountain's base and the surrounding lower elevations.

The weather of Mount Washington is notoriously erratic. This is partly due to the convergence of several storm tracks, mainly from the Atlantic to the south, the Gulf region and the Pacific Northwest. The vertical rise of the Presidential Range, combined with its north–south orientation, makes it a significant barrier to westerly winds. Low-pressure areas are more favorable to develop along the coastline in the winter due to the relative temperature differences between the northeastern United States and the Atlantic Ocean. With these factors combined, hurricane-force wind gusts are observed from the summit of the mountain on average of 110 days per year. These extreme winds also contribute to the mountain's very short treeline, with elevations as low as 4,400 feet (1,300 m) being too hostile to support any plant life more than a few inches (centimeters) in height.

The wind speed of 231 mph (372 km/h) recorded on Mount Washington during the afternoon of April 12, 1934, was the highest ever recorded until 1996 and remains the highest non-cyclonic (straight-line) wind speed as well as the highest in the Northern Hemisphere and Western Hemisphere.

The first regular meteorological observations on Mount Washington were conducted by the U.S. Signal Service, a precursor of the National Weather Service, from 1870 to 1892. The Mount Washington station was the first of its kind in the world, setting an example followed in many other countries. For many years, the record low temperature was thought to be −47 °F (−43.9 °C) occurring on January 29, 1934, but upon the first in-depth examination of the data from the 19th century at NOAA's National Climatic Data Center in Asheville, North Carolina, a new record low was discovered. Mount Washington's official record low of −50 °F (−45.6 °C) was recorded on January 22, 1885. The official record low daily maximum is −28 °F (−33.3 °C) on February 6, 1995. Highs of 0 °F (−18 °C; 255 K) or below occur on 13 days annually, while lows at or below 0 °F (−18 °C; 255 K) can be expected from November 17 through April 1; from December to March, temperatures rise above freezing (0 °C or 32 °F or 273 K) on only 15 days.

On January 16, 2004, the summit weather observation registered a temperature of −43.6 °F (−42.0 °C) and sustained winds of 87.5 mph (140.8 km/h), resulting in a wind chill value of −102.59 °F (−74.8 °C) at the mountain. During a 71-hour period from approximately 3 p.m. on January 13 to 2 p.m. on January 16, 2004, the wind chill on the summit never went above −50 °F (−45.6 °C). The official record high temperature at the summit is 72 °F (22.2 °C) on June 26, 2003, and August 2, 1975, while the official record high daily minimum is 60 °F (15.6 °C), recorded on the latter date. Readings of 60 °F (15.6 °C) or higher at the summit are seen an average of 13.5 days annually.

On February 3–4, 2023, overnight wind gusts of over 100 miles per hour (160 km/h) and a temperature of −47 °F (−43.9 °C) combined to produce a new US record low windchill temperature of −108 °F (−77.8 °C), breaking the previous figure of −103 °F (−75.0 °C). Temperatures remained at or below −45 °F or −42.8 °C for 13 straight hours on February 3–4, 2023, and a −47 °F (−43.9 °C) reading from the morning of February 4, 2023, was the coldest reading in 89 years, tying a previous record low observed in January 1934.

The primary summit building was designed to withstand 300 mph (480 km/h) winds; other structures are chained to the mountain. In addition to a number of broadcast towers, the mountain is the site of a non-profit scientific observatory reporting the weather as well as other aspects of the subarctic climate of the mountain. The extreme environment creates strong winds and ice at the top of Mount Washington making the use of unmanned equipment problematic. The observatory also conducts research, primarily the testing of new weather measurement devices. The Sherman Adams summit building, which houses the observatory, is closed to the public during the winter and hikers are not allowed inside the building except for pre-arranged guided tours.

In 1932, the Mount Washington Observatory was built on the summit through a group interested in and noting the worth of a research facility at that demanding location. The observatory's weather data have accumulated a climate record since. Temperature and humidity readings have been collected using a sling psychrometer, a simple device containing two mercury thermometers. Where most unstaffed weather stations have undergone technology upgrades, consistent use of the sling psychrometer has helped provide scientific precision to the Mount Washington climate record.

The observatory makes prominent use of the slogan "Home of the World's Worst Weather", a claim that originated with a 1940 article in Appalachia magazine by Charles Brooks, the man generally given the majority of credit for creating the Mount Washington Observatory. The article was titled "The Worst Weather in the World" even though it concluded that Mount Washington most likely did not have the world's worst weather.

=== Image gallery ===
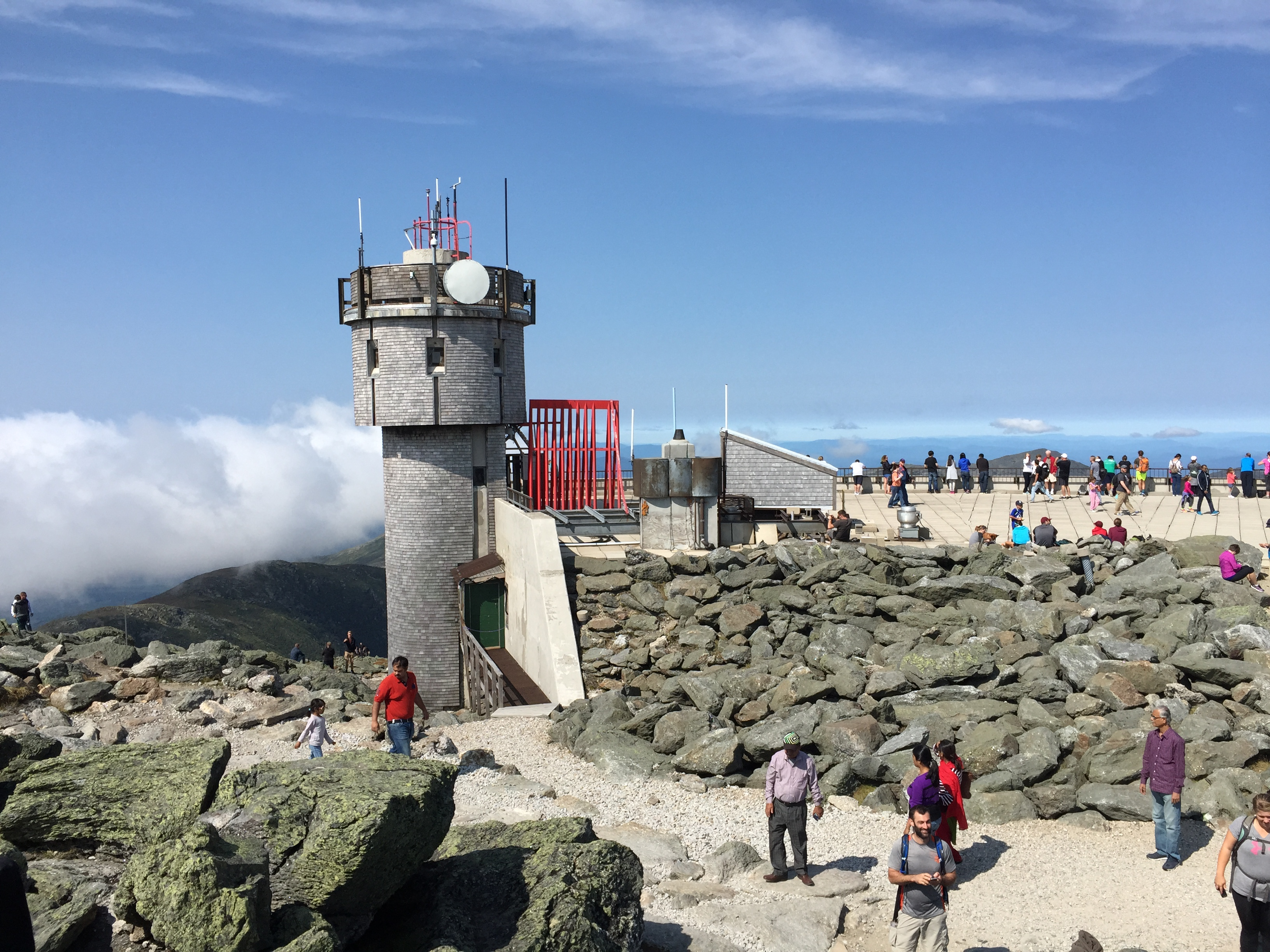
Mount Washington Observatory

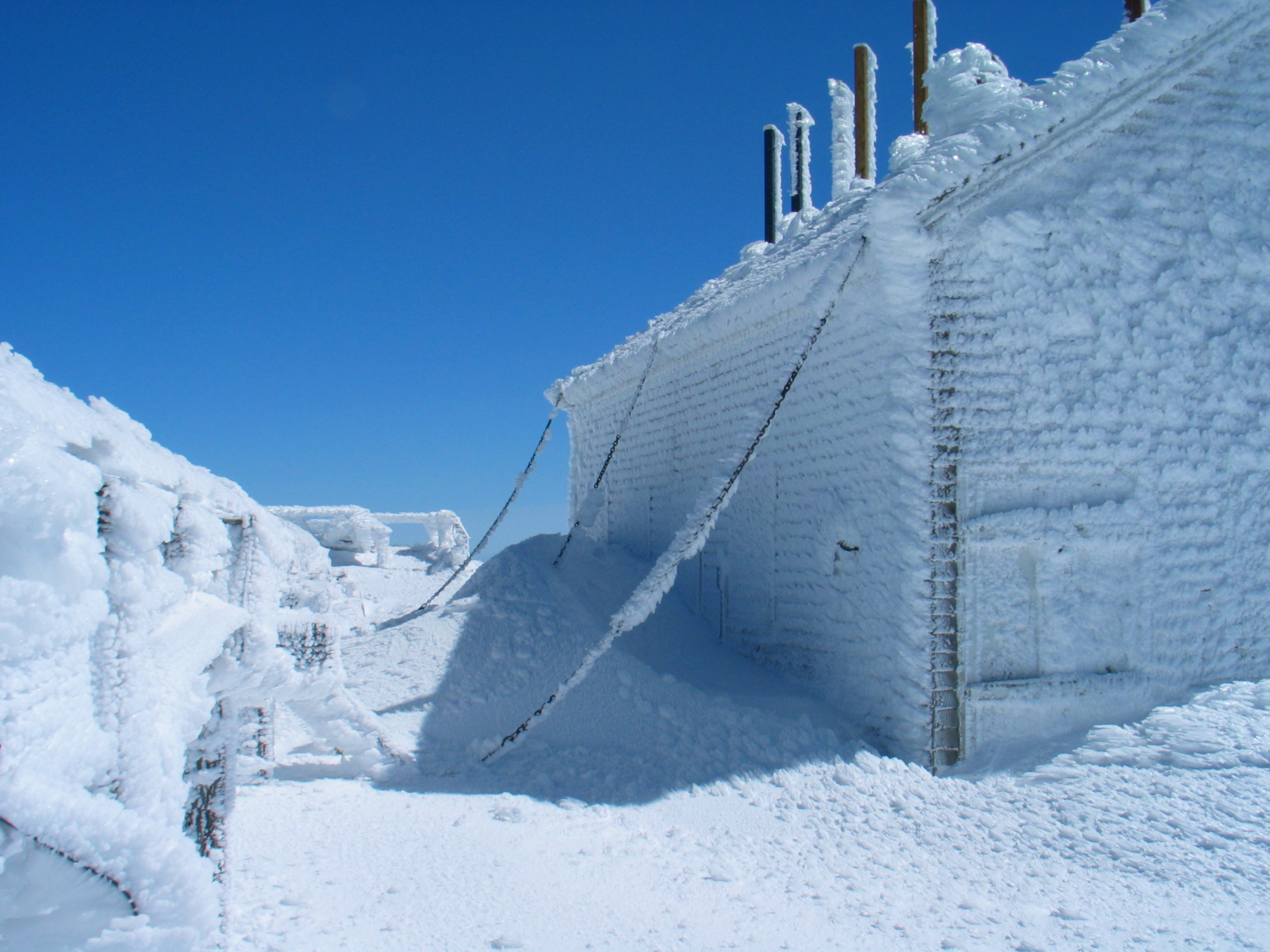
The original weathered shingle-clad building is chained to the ground, here covered in rime ice in early April.

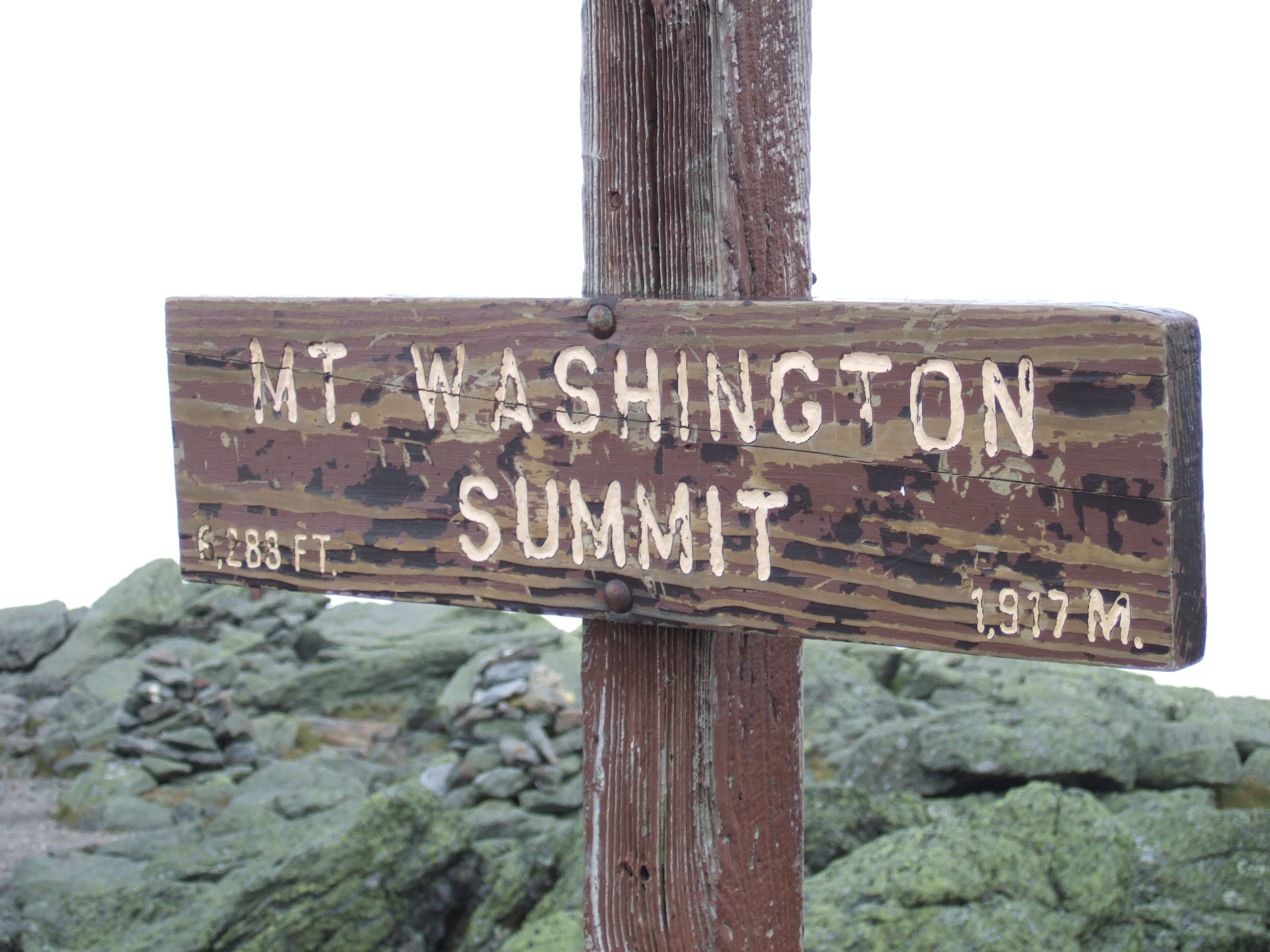
The summit of Mount Washington is frequently obscured by clouds.

=== Precipitation ===
Climate chart for Mount Washington

Due in part to its high prominence, to its situation at the confluence of two major storm tracks, and to the north–south orientation of the Presidential Range ridgeline, which it crowns, Mount Washington receives high levels of precipitation, averaging an equivalent of 91.2 in (2,320 mm) of rain per year, (Note: Measurable (0.1 in (2.5 mm)) precipitation occurs on an average 210 days annually, with 26 of those days seeing 1 in (25 mm) or more.) with a record high for a calendar year of 130.14 in (3,305.6 mm) in 1969 and a low of 71.34 in (1,812.0 mm) in 1979. Monthly precipitation has ranged from 0.75 in (19.1 mm) in October 1947 to 28.70 in (729.0 mm) in October 2005. Large amounts of precipitation often fall in a short period of time: in October 1996, a record 11.07 in (281.2 mm) of precipitation fell during a single 24-hour period. A substantial amount of this falls as snow, with a seasonal (Note: The snow season is defined as July 1 through June 30 of the following calendar year) average of around 280 inches (7 m) of snow; seasonal accumulation has ranged from 75.8 inches (1.9 m) in 1947–48 to 566.4 inches (14 m) in 1968–69. The record amount of snowfall in a 24-hour period, 49.3 inches or 1.3 meters, occurred in February 1969, which is also the snowiest month on record with 172.8 inches or 4.4 meters.

Climate data for Mount Washington, elev. 6,267 ft (1,910.2 m) near the summit (1991–2020 normals, extremes 1933–present)
| Month | Jan | Feb | Mar | Apr | May | Jun | Jul | Aug | Sep | Oct | Nov | Dec | Year |
|---|---|---|---|---|---|---|---|---|---|---|---|---|---|
| Record high °F (°C) | 48 (9) | 48 (9) | 54 (12) | 60 (16) | 66 (19) | 72 (22) | 71 (22) | 72 (22) | 69 (21) | 62 (17) | 52 (11) | 47 (8) | 72 (22) |
| Mean maximum °F (°C) | 38.7 (3.7) | 35.6 (2.0) | 40.8 (4.9) | 49.0 (9.4) | 58.8 (14.9) | 64.5 (18.1) | 65.4 (18.6) | 64.2 (17.9) | 61.4 (16.3) | 53.8 (12.1) | 45.8 (7.7) | 39.8 (4.3) | 67.2 (19.6) |
| Mean daily maximum °F (°C) | 14.9 (−9.5) | 14.8 (−9.6) | 20.8 (−6.2) | 30.7 (−0.7) | 42.5 (5.8) | 51.4 (10.8) | 55.3 (12.9) | 54.2 (12.3) | 49.1 (9.5) | 37.7 (3.2) | 28.4 (−2.0) | 20.1 (−6.6) | 35.0 (1.7) |
| Daily mean °F (°C) | 5.8 (−14.6) | 5.9 (−14.5) | 12.9 (−10.6) | 23.7 (−4.6) | 36.3 (2.4) | 45.5 (7.5) | 49.9 (9.9) | 48.7 (9.3) | 43.1 (6.2) | 31.3 (−0.4) | 20.8 (−6.2) | 11.8 (−11.2) | 28.0 (−2.2) |
| Mean daily minimum °F (°C) | −3.2 (−19.6) | −3.0 (−19.4) | 4.9 (−15.1) | 16.7 (−8.5) | 30.2 (−1.0) | 39.6 (4.2) | 44.5 (6.9) | 43.2 (6.2) | 37.1 (2.8) | 24.9 (−3.9) | 13.1 (−10.5) | 3.5 (−15.8) | 21.0 (−6.1) |
| Mean minimum °F (°C) | −28.6 (−33.7) | −25.2 (−31.8) | −19.4 (−28.6) | −1.1 (−18.4) | 14.0 (−10.0) | 25.7 (−3.5) | 34.4 (1.3) | 31.4 (−0.3) | 21.3 (−5.9) | 8.3 (−13.2) | −5.8 (−21.0) | −20.8 (−29.3) | −32.3 (−35.7) |
| Record low °F (°C) | −47 (−44) | −47 (−44) | −38 (−39) | −20 (−29) | −2 (−19) | 8 (−13) | 24 (−4) | 20 (−7) | 9 (−13) | −5 (−21) | −26 (−32) | −46 (−43) | −47 (−44) |
| Average precipitation inches (mm) | 5.74 (146) | 5.45 (138) | 6.72 (171) | 7.31 (186) | 7.68 (195) | 8.59 (218) | 8.93 (227) | 7.72 (196) | 7.66 (195) | 9.99 (254) | 8.09 (205) | 7.35 (187) | 91.23 (2,317) |
| Average snowfall inches (cm) | 41.4 (105) | 43.3 (110) | 46.2 (117) | 33.1 (84) | 12.9 (33) | 1.3 (3.3) | 0.0 (0.0) | 0.1 (0.25) | 1.2 (3.0) | 19.0 (48) | 35.6 (90) | 47.7 (121) | 281.8 (716) |
| Average extreme snow depth inches (cm) | 14.1 (36) | 16.3 (41) | 17.6 (45) | 14.5 (37) | 6.1 (15) | 0.5 (1.3) | 0.0 (0.0) | 0.0 (0.0) | 0.3 (0.76) | 5.7 (14) | 8.3 (21) | 12.7 (32) | 21.0 (53) |
| Average precipitation days (≥ 0.01 in) | 20.0 | 18.3 | 19.7 | 18.3 | 17.4 | 17.6 | 17.5 | 15.5 | 13.7 | 18.1 | 19.2 | 21.0 | 216.3 |
| Average snowy days (≥ 0.1 in) | 19.6 | 18.1 | 18.0 | 14.1 | 6.5 | 1.2 | 0.2 | 0.2 | 1.3 | 9.9 | 15.1 | 19.7 | 123.9 |
| Mean monthly sunshine hours | 92.0 | 106.9 | 127.6 | 143.2 | 171.3 | 151.3 | 145.0 | 130.5 | 127.2 | 127.1 | 82.4 | 83.1 | 1,487.6 |
| Percentage possible sunshine | 32 | 36 | 34 | 35 | 37 | 33 | 31 | 30 | 34 | 37 | 29 | 30 | 33 |
Source 1: NOAA (sun 1961–1990)
Source 2: Mount Washington Observatory (extremes 1933–present)

See or edit raw graph data.

== Geographical features ==
Mount Washington is underlain by Devonian-era banded schist and quartzite.

Although the western slope that the Cog Railway ascends is straightforward from base to summit, the mountain's other sides are more complex. On the north side, Great Gulf—the mountain's largest glacial cirque—forms an amphitheater surrounded by the Northern Presidentials: Mounts Clay, Jefferson, Adams and Madison. These connected peaks reach well into the treeless alpine zone. Massive Chandler Ridge extends northeast from the summit of Washington to form the amphitheater's southern wall and the incline is ascended by the Mount Washington Auto Road.

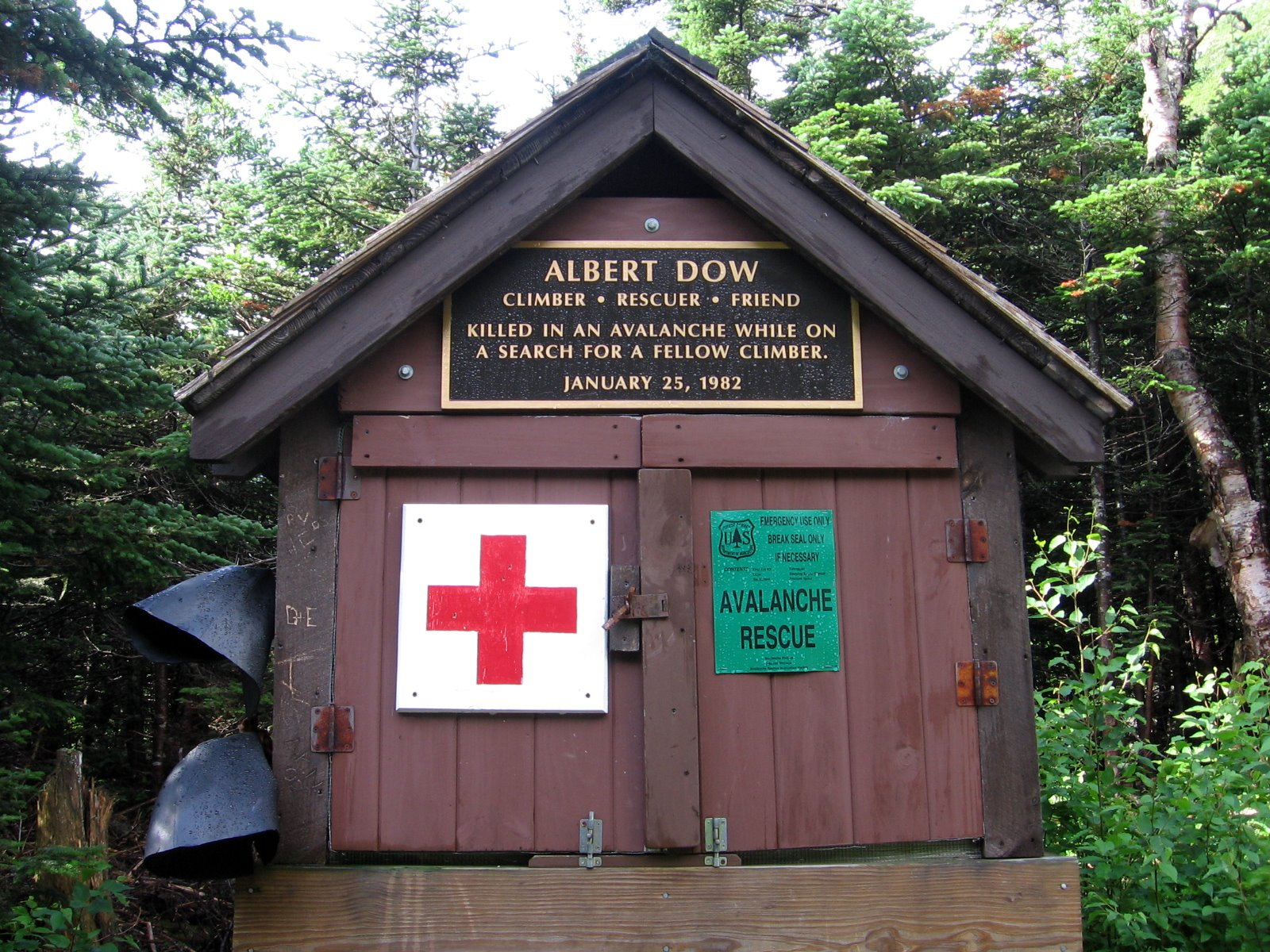
First aid cache

East of the summit, a plateau known as the Alpine Gardens extends south from Chandler Ridge at about 5,200 feet (1,600 m) elevation. It is notable for plant species either endemic to alpine meadows in the White Mountains or outliers of larger populations in arctic regions far to the north. Alpine Gardens drops off precipitously into two prominent glacial cirques. Craggy Huntington Ravine offers rock and ice climbing in an alpine setting. More rounded Tuckerman Ravine is New England's best-known site for spring back-country skiing as late as June and then a scenic hiking route.

South of the summit lies a second and larger alpine plateau, Bigelow Lawn, at 5,000 feet (1,500 m) to 5,500 feet (1,700 m) elevation. Satellite summit Boott Spur and then the Montalban Ridge including Mount Isolation and Mount Davis extend south from it, while the higher Southern Presidentials—Mounts Monroe, Franklin, Eisenhower, Pierce, Jackson and Webster—extend southwest to Crawford Notch. Oakes Gulf separates the two high ridges.

== Uses ==
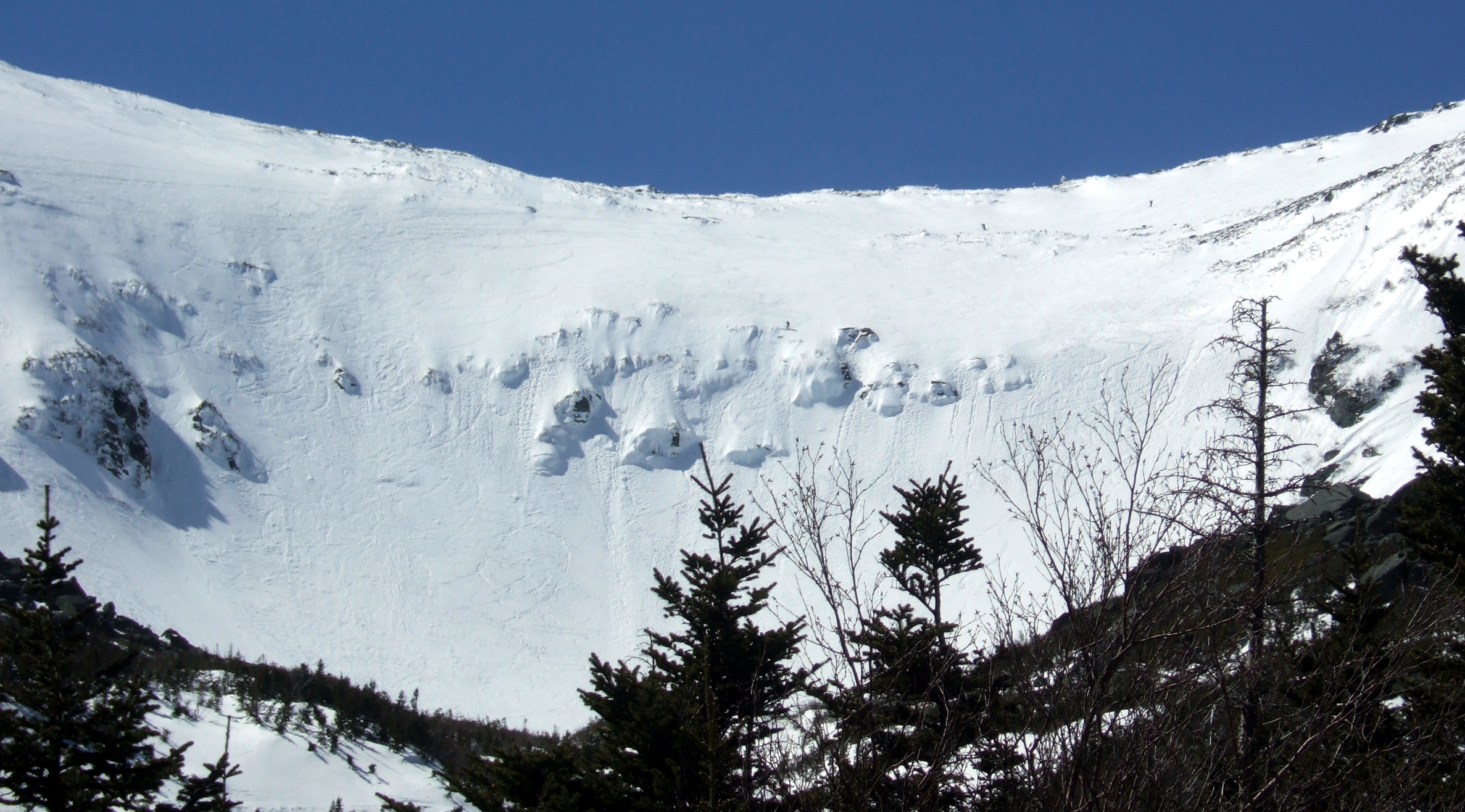
Bowl of Tuckerman Ravine, showing skiers above the lip

The mountain is part of a popular hiking area, with the Appalachian Trail traversing below the summit past one of the Appalachian Mountain Club's eight mountain huts, the Lakes of the Clouds Hut, located on one of the mountain's shoulders. Winter recreation includes Tuckerman Ravine, famous for its Memorial Day skiing and its 50-degree slopes. The ravine is notorious for its avalanches, of which about 100 are recorded every year, and which have killed six people since 1849. Scores of hikers have died on the mountain in all seasons, due to harsh and rapidly changing conditions, inadequate equipment, and failure to plan for the wide variety of conditions that can occur above tree line.

The weather at Mount Washington has made it a site for glider flying. In 2005, it was recognized as the 14th National Landmark of Soaring.

=== Hiking ===
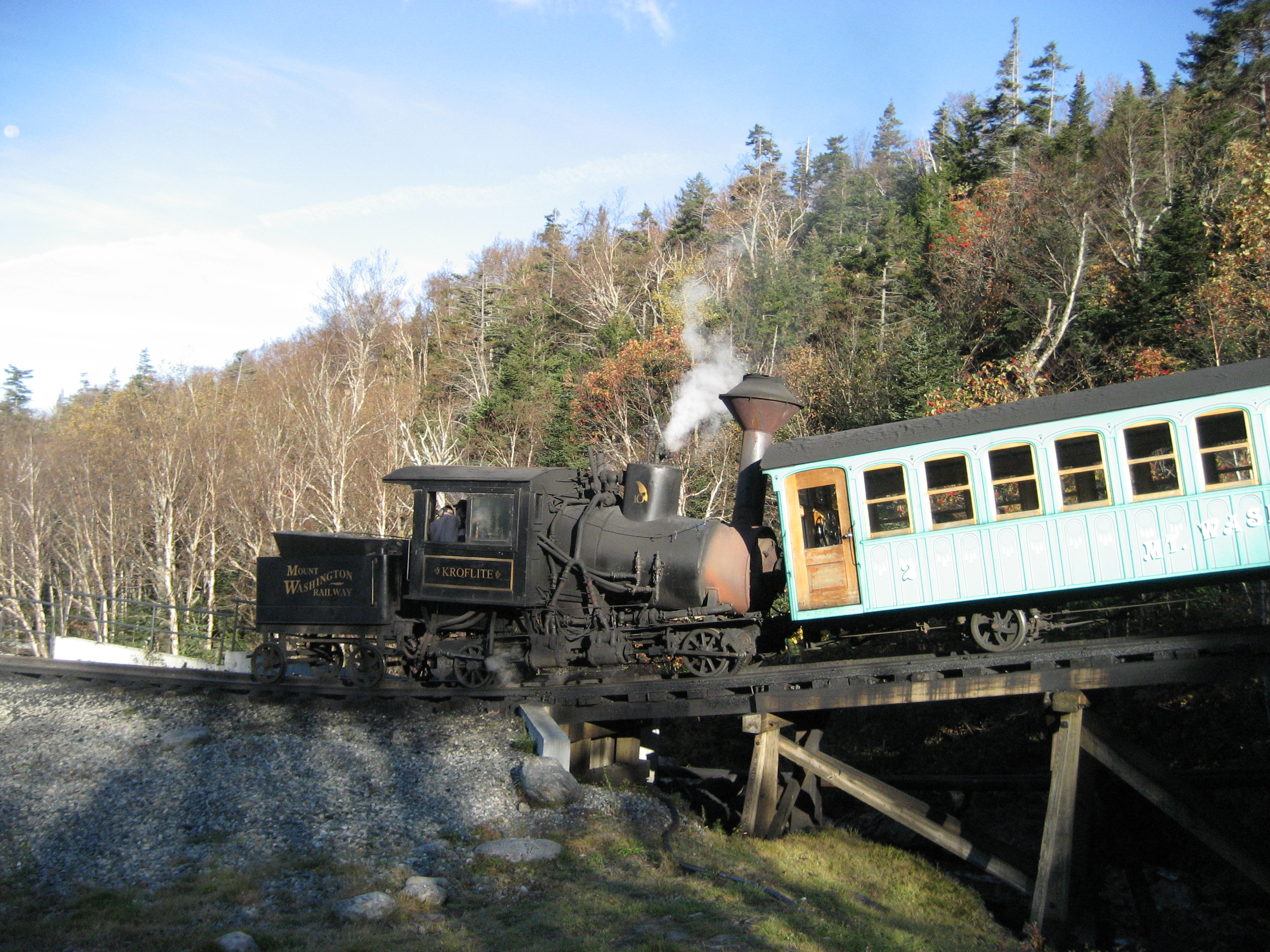
The Mount Washington Cog Railway in 2006

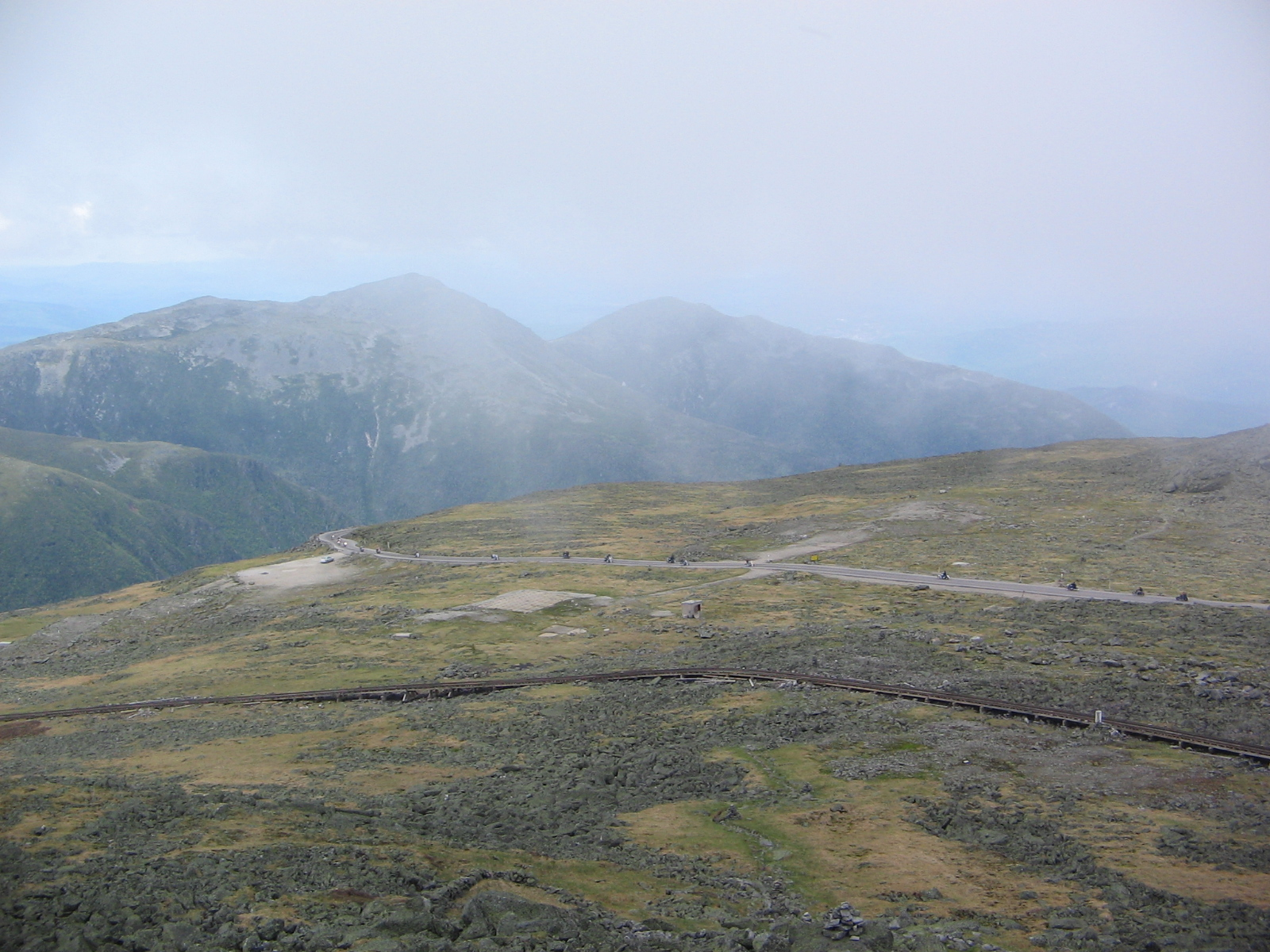
Motorcycles cruise the auto road.

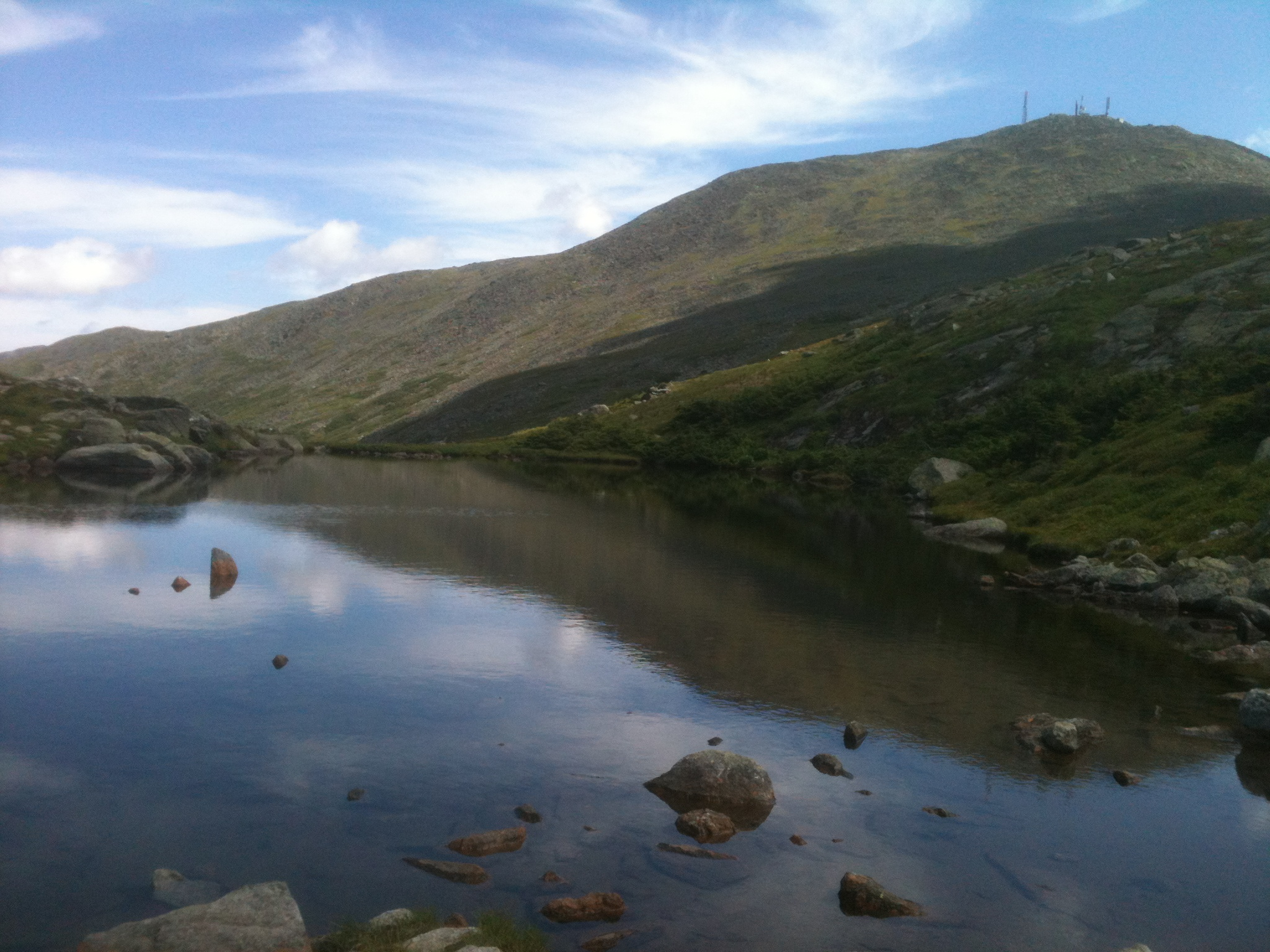
Mount Washington from the Lakes of the Clouds

The most common hiking trail approach to the summit is via the 4.1-mile (6.6 km) Tuckerman Ravine Trail. It starts at the Pinkham Notch camp area and gains 4,280 feet (1,300 m), leading straight up the bowl of Tuckerman Ravine via a series of steep rock steps that afford views of the ravine and across the notch to Wildcat Mountain. Fatalities have occurred on the trail, both from ski accidents and hypothermia. Water bottles may be refilled at the base of the bowl 2.1 miles (3.4 km) up the trail at a well pump near the Hermit Lake Shelters, which offers snacks, toilets and shelter. At the summit is a center with a museum, gift shop, observation area, cafeteria, and the Mount Washington Observatory. Other routes up the eastern slopes of the mountain include the Lion Head, Boott Spur, Huntington Ravine and Nelson Crag trails, as well as the Great Gulf Trail ascending from the northeast. Routes from the western slopes include the Ammonoosuc Ravine and Jewell trails and the Crawford Path and Gulfside Trail (coincident with the Appalachian Trail from the southwest and from the north, respectively).

There are many differences between climbing Mount Washington in summer and climbing it in winter. There are no public facilities on the summit in winter. In the winter months, the most common route is the Lion Head Winter Route, which begins on the Tuckerman Ravine Trail but then turns north to ascend up to Lion Head at elevation 5,033 feet (1,534 m). The winter route variation is recommended to help climbers avoid avalanche danger. Exactly where the route turns from the Tuckerman Ravine Trail depends on the snow conditions. If the amount of snowfall has not been significant, the Lion Head Summer Route may be open. After hiking 2.3 miles (3.7 km) from the visitor center in Pinkham Notch, the trail will take a right turn onto the Lion Head Summer Route. If there has been enough snow accumulation on the summer Lion Head Trail, the Forest Service will open the Lion Head Winter Route, which turns off after approximately 1.7 miles (2.7 km).

=== Cog railway ===
Since 1869, the Mount Washington Cog Railway has provided tourists with a train journey to the summit of Mount Washington. It uses a Marsh rack system and was the first successful rack railway in the US. The railway travels up the west side of the mountain.

=== Auto Road ===
The Mount Washington Auto Road—originally the Mount Washington Carriage Road—is a 7.6-mile (12.2 km) private toll road on the east side of the mountain, rising 4,618 feet (1,408 m) from an altitude of 1,527 feet (465 m) at the bottom to 6,145 feet (1,873 m) at the top, an average gradient of 11.6%. The road was completed and opened to the public in 1861, eight years before the Cog Railway. There are several annual races on the Auto Road.

=== Races ===
Every June, the mountain is the site of the Mount Washington Road Race, an event that attracts hundreds of runners. In August the Mount Washington Auto Road Bicycle Hillclimb, a bicycle race, takes place along the same route as the road race. The hillclimb's notable contestants include former Tour de France contender Tyler Hamilton.

On August 7, 1932, Raymond E. Welch became the first one-legged man to climb Mount Washington. An official race was held and open only to one-legged people. Mr. Welch climbed the "Jacob's Ladder" route and descended via the carriage road. At the time of his climb, he was the station agent for the Boston & Maine Railroad in Northumberland, New Hampshire.

The mountain is also the host to one of the oldest car races in the country, the Mount Washington Hillclimb Auto Race, which has been held on and off since 1904. Travis Pastrana set record ascents in 2010, 2014, 2017, and 2021, driving a Subaru WRX STi to a record of five minutes and 28.67 seconds. In 2014 EVSR created by Entropy Racing was the first electric car to compete at Mt. Washington with an official time for driver Tim O'Neil of seven minutes and 28.92 seconds.

=== Backcountry skiing ===
Tuckerman Ravine, a glacial cirque on the mountain's southeast side, is a popular backcountry skiing destination, attracting tens of thousands of skiers to the mountain each year. Skiers have skied down the headwall since 1931, first by two Dartmouth students, John Carleton and Charles Proctor, who were quickly followed by a group from Harvard who skied the headwall from the summit of Mount Washington for the first time. The ravine soon became an important site for extreme skiing in New England.

The mountain hosted the first giant slalom race in the United States in 1937, the Franklin Edson Memorial Race.

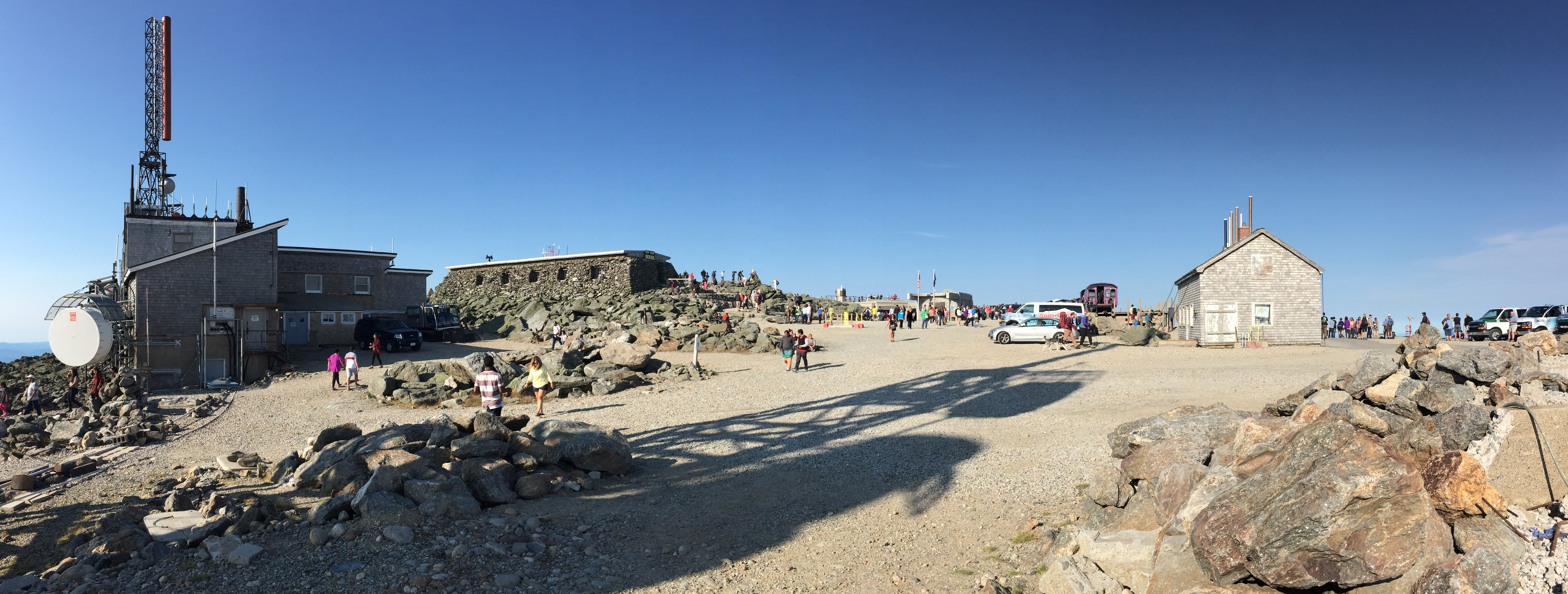
Panorama of the buildings on the summit

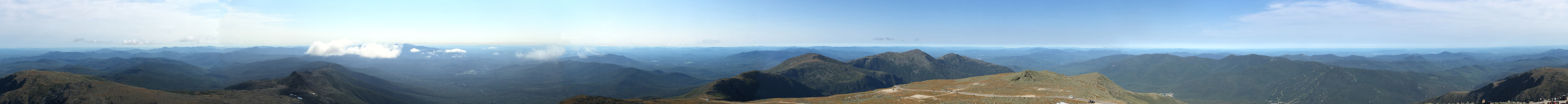
Stitched 360-degree panorama from around the summit

== Transmission facilities ==
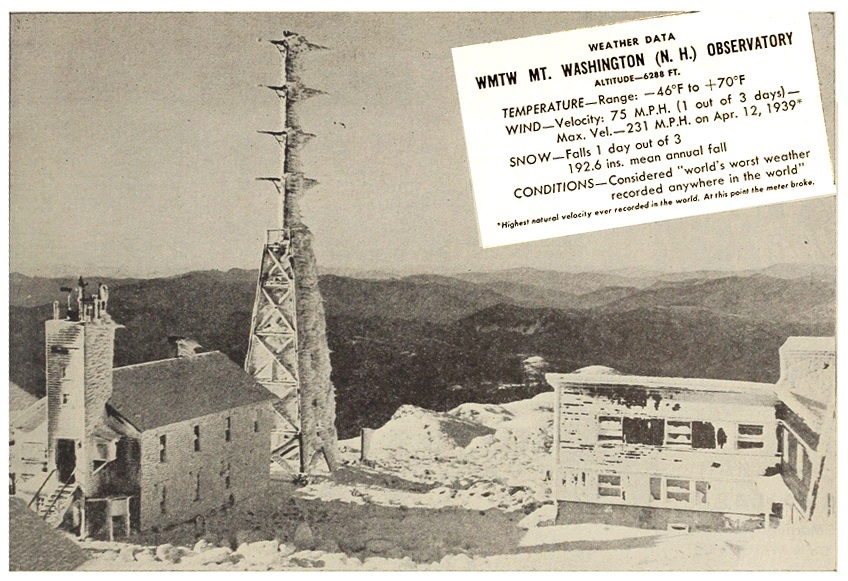
FM broadcasting station WMTW's ice-covered Mount Washington transmitter site in 1944.

Due to its status as the highest elevation in the northeast United States, the top of the mountain is a popular site for stations that require transmission ranges over a broad territory, but which operate on frequencies that are generally limited to line-of-sight coverage. In 2003, it was reported that the summit was the site used "for three commercial radio stations and dozens of state, federal and private agencies, including the state police".

Use of the mountain summit as a transmitter site dates to the 1930s. At this time investigations were begun into establishing radio stations broadcasting on "Very High Frequency" (VHF) assignments above 30 MHz. Reception of stations operating on these frequencies tended to be limited to line-of-sight distances, so operating from the top of Mount Washington was ideal for providing maximum coverage. As of 1938 it was reported that at least five experimental stations were located on the mountain.

The most prominent of the early experimental stations was W1XER, originally an "Apex" radio station licensed to the Yankee Network, that was moved from Boston to the mountain in 1937, and initially used to relay meteorological information from the weather observatory. With the aid of Edwin H. Armstrong, the station was converted from an AM transmitter into an FM broadcasting station, although the conversion process turned out to be an arduous undertaking, and W1XER did not start broadcast programming on a regular schedule until December 19, 1940. This station's facilities included construction of the original broadcast tower, the Yankee Building housing the crew and transmitter equipment, and the first power house building. Commercial broadcasting commenced on April 5, 1941, initially with the call sign W39B. (Note: The initial policy for commercial FM station call signs included an initial "W" for stations located east of the Mississippi River, followed by the last two digits of a station's frequency assignment, "39" corresponding with 43.9 MHz in this case, and closing with a one or two character city identifier, which for stations serving the Boston, Massachusetts region was "B".) Effective November 1, 1943, the station call sign was changed to WMTW, and in late 1946 the call letters were changed again, to WMNE. WMNE ceased operations in late 1948, due to excessive maintenance costs, and concern that a mandatory frequency change to the new FM "high band" would cause an unacceptable decrease in transmission range.

In 1954 WMTW, channel 8, licensed to Poland Spring, Maine, constructed a TV tower and transmitter and began operations from the mountain, including local forecasts by then WMTW transmitter engineer Marty Engstrom. In its first decades, WMTW served as the ABC Network affiliate for the Portland, Burlington, Montreal and Sherbrooke television markets, thanks to its wide coverage area. This station relocated its transmitter away from the mountain in 2002, due to concerns that a mandated switch from analog to digital transmissions would result in insufficient coverage if the transmitter remained at the mountaintop.

There are currently two FM stations located at the mountain. 1958 saw the construction of WMTW-FM 94.9 MHz (now WHOM). A second station, WMOU (now WPKQ), moved to the summit in 1987, installing transmitters in the Yankee building and constructing a new broadcast tower behind the building, which is the tallest structure on the summit.

WHOM and WMTW-TV shared a transmitter building, which also housed the generators used to supply electrical power to the various facilities atop the mountain. However, on February 9, 2003, a major fire broke out in the generator room of the transmitter building, which had become the property of the state only a year earlier when WMTW left the summit. The fire destroyed the building, including WHOM's transmitters as well as the summit's main generators, and also spread to the adjacent Old Yankee Power House building, which housed the emergency generator, destroying that building also and disrupting all power to the summit. Temporary generators had to be transported up the mountain to restore power to the observatory and to the Yankee building, which houses important public safety communications equipment. A makeshift generator room was constructed underneath the canopy of the Sherman Adams building across from the public entrance to replace the destroyed buildings. The makeshift generator room was later made permanent when power cables were installed in 2009, delivering grid power to the summit for the first time.

The original Armstrong tower still stands today. The Yankee Building also remains and continues to serve as a communications facility, housing equipment for numerous tenants including cellular telephone providers and public safety agencies. The old sign from the destroyed Old Yankee Power House building was placed above the doorway to the new generator room. WHOM subsequently built a new transmitter building on the site of the old power building, and also installed a new standby antenna on the Armstrong tower. (For the first time since 1948, the Armstrong tower was used for broadcasts.)

The National Weather Service (NWS) forecast office in Gray, Maine, operates NOAA Weather Radio station KZZ41 on 162.5 MHz from the summit of Mount Washington. The NWS coverage map indicates that it can be heard throughout most of New Hampshire, western Maine, northeast Vermont, and portions of southern Canada. During very clear conditions, KZZ41 has the potential to reach the majority of northern Massachusetts (including some northern areas of Greater Boston and much of the North Shore) as well as the majority of Vermont and Maine.

In June 2008, the possibility of television returning to Mount Washington arose, with the filing by New Hampshire Public Television to move WLED-TV from its current location near Littleton to the old WMTW mast on top.

== Deaths ==
As of 2019, more than 161 people had died in the Presidential range, since record-keeping began in 1849. Author Nicholas Howe has detailed many of the fatalities on this mountain in his book Not Without Peril published in 2000 and updated in 2009. The foreword to the 2009 edition states that many of the deaths over the past 150 years can be attributed to poor planning and lack of understanding of "the difference in weather between Boston and the mountains. The latter are farther north, farther inland and much higher than the city."

The actual terrain on most of Washington is not particularly challenging or technical in comparison to other mountains in the Appalachians other than sheer height, and even a novice hiker with the correct preparation and conditions can reach the summit with perseverance. The greatest danger with climbing comes from the fact that most of the uppermost reaches of the mountain are in the treeless, fully-exposed alpine zone, where there is minimal cover from the (often severe) weather conditions that are amplified by elevation. Mount Washington itself contains around 65 acres of tundra on its peak, the most of any mountain east of Colorado.

William Buckingham Curtis, often posthumously called "the father of American amateur athletics", died from exhaustion on June 30, 1900, near Lakes of the Clouds Hut during a summer snowstorm.

== Artistic tributes ==
Mount Washington has been the subject of several famous paintings, part of a New England school of art known as White Mountain art. Inspired by the Hudson River School of landscape painting, a number of artists during the Victorian era ventured into the White Mountains in search of natural subjects. Train service in the area spurred increased tourism and the construction of the Glen House where Albert Bierstadt and his photographer brother (Bierstadt Brothers) stayed. John P. Soule, John B. Heywood and the Kilburn Brothers also produced stereoscopic images of scenery in the area.

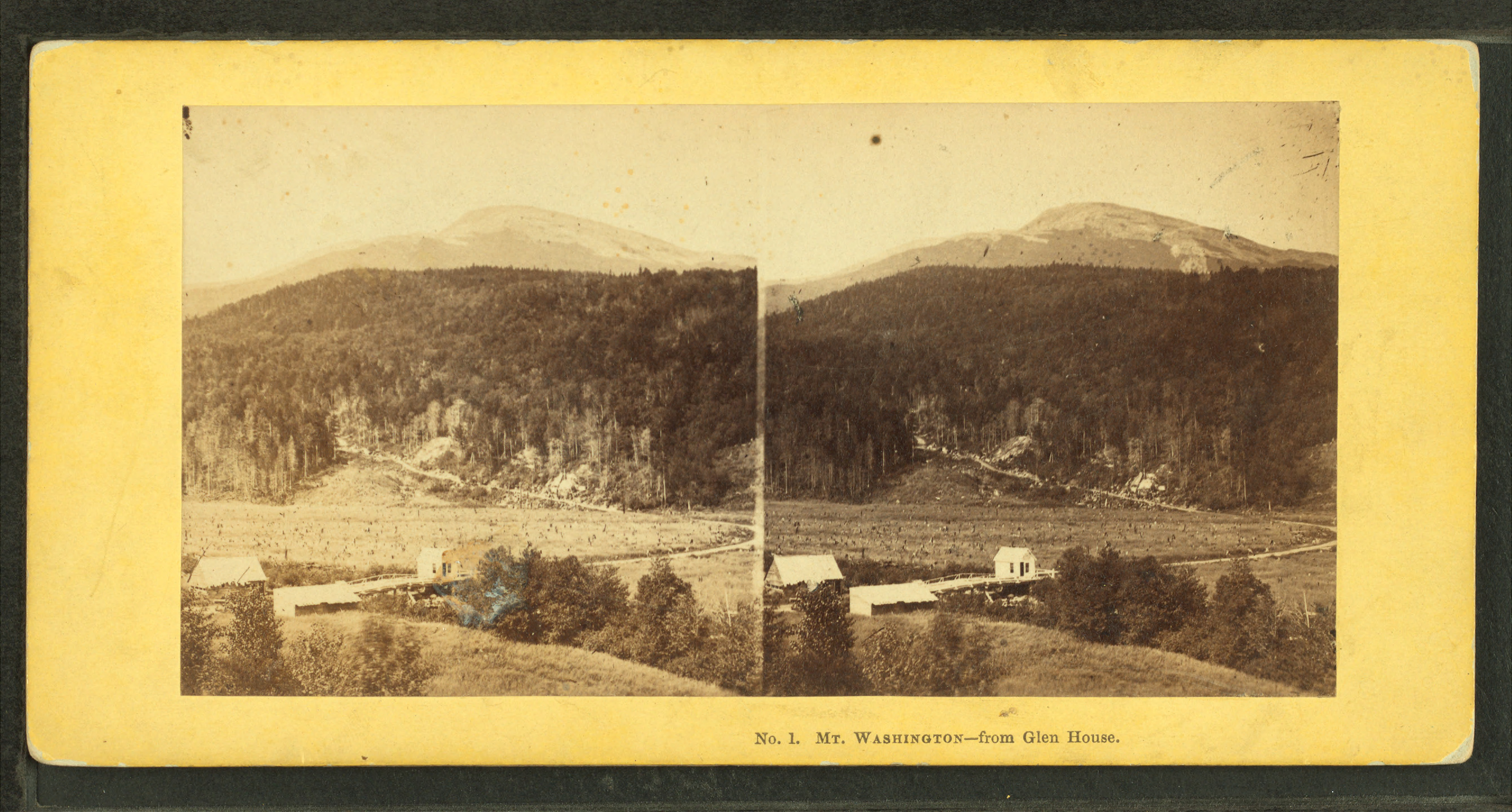
Mount Washington from Glen House in a stereoscopic image by John P. Soule

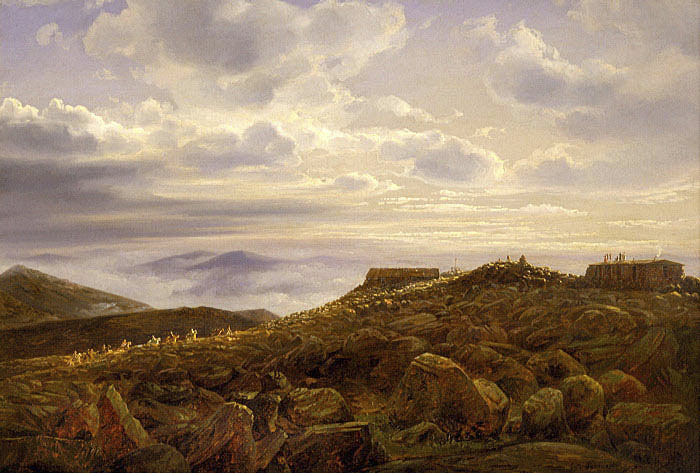
Ferdinand Richardt (1857)

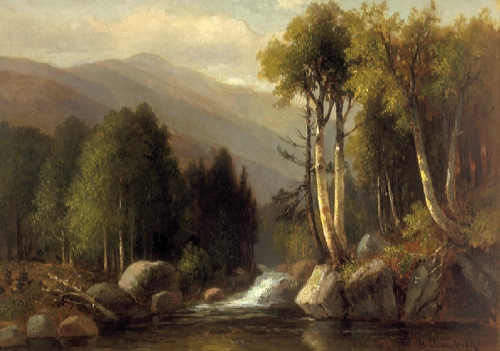
Benjamin Champney

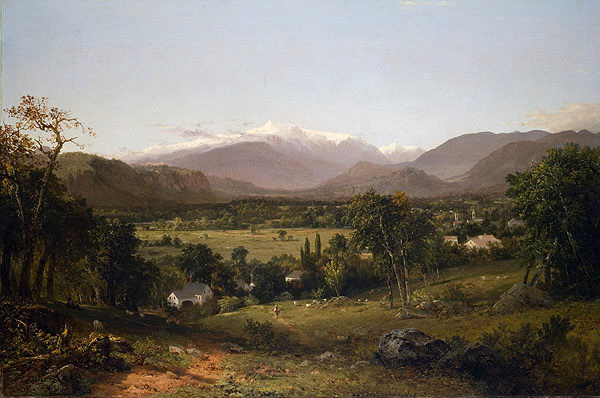
John F. Kensett (1869)

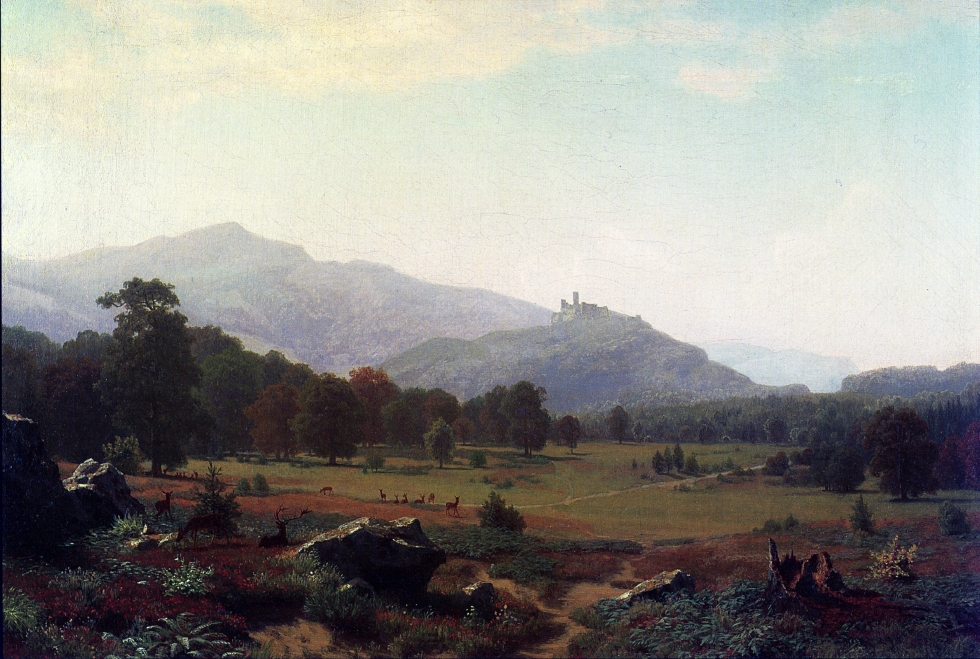
Albert Bierstadt (1858)

== See also ==
- Freelan Oscar Stanley
- List of mountain peaks of North America
  - List of mountain peaks of the United States
    - List of U.S. states by elevation
    - List of Ultras of the United States
