= Hadley's Purchase, New Hampshire =

Township in Coos County, New Hampshire, United States

- Township
- Northern half of Hadley's Purchase as seen from Mount Crawford. Crawford Notch in left distance, Mount Washington far right.

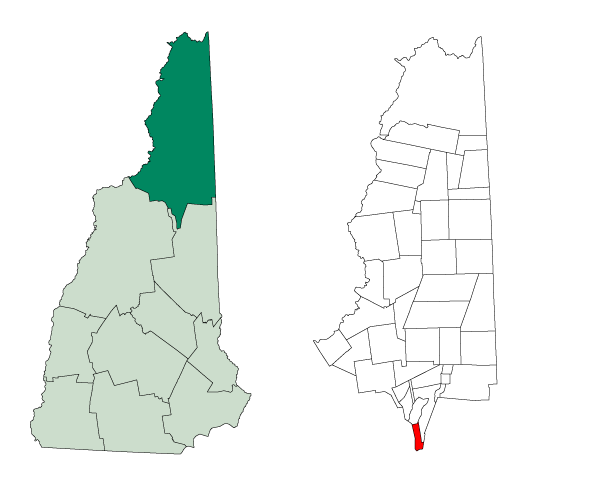
- Location in Coös County, New Hampshire
- Coordinates: 44°07′42″N 71°19′56″W
- Country: United States
- State: New Hampshire
- County: Coös

Area
  - Total: 7.4 sq mi (19.2 km^{2})
  - Land: 7.4 sq mi (19.2 km^{2})
  - Water: 0 sq mi (0 km^{2}) 0%
- Elevation: 2,550 ft (780 m)

Population (2020)
  - Total: 0
- Time zone: UTC-5 (Eastern)
  - Summer (DST): UTC-4 (Eastern)
- Area code: 603
- FIPS code: 33-007-32420
- GNIS feature ID: 872009

Hadley's Purchase is a township located in the southernmost portion of Coös County, New Hampshire, United States. The purchase had a population of zero at the 2020 census, and was also estimated to be zero in 2025. The purchase lies entirely within the White Mountain National Forest.

In New Hampshire, locations, grants, townships (which are different from towns), and purchases are unincorporated portions of a county which are not part of any town and have limited self-government (if any, as many are uninhabited).

== History ==
The purchase takes its name from Henry G. Hadley, who bought approximately 8,000 acres (32 km^{2}) from the state in 1834 for $500.

== Geography ==
According to the United States Census Bureau, the purchase has a total area of 7.4 square miles (19.2 km^{2}), all land other than streams. The highest point in the purchase is 3,180 feet (970 m) above sea level, along its eastern border. The highest summit in Hadley's Purchase is 3,119-foot (951 m) Mount Crawford, in the center of the purchase.

U.S. Route 302 in neighboring Hart's Location roughly parallels the southern and western limits of the purchase, passing within approximately 0.4 miles (0.64 km) to 1 mile (1.6 km) of the border.

=== Adjacent municipalities ===
- Cutt's Grant (north)
- Sargent's Purchase (east)
- Bartlett (southeast)
- Hart's Location (west)

== Demographics ==
Historical population
Census	Pop.	Note	%±
1960	0		—
1970	0		—
1980	0		—
1990	0		—
2000	0		—
2010	0		—
2020	0		—
U.S. Decennial Census

As of the 2020 census, there were no people living in the township.
