= Crawford family of the White Mountains =

New Hampshire family

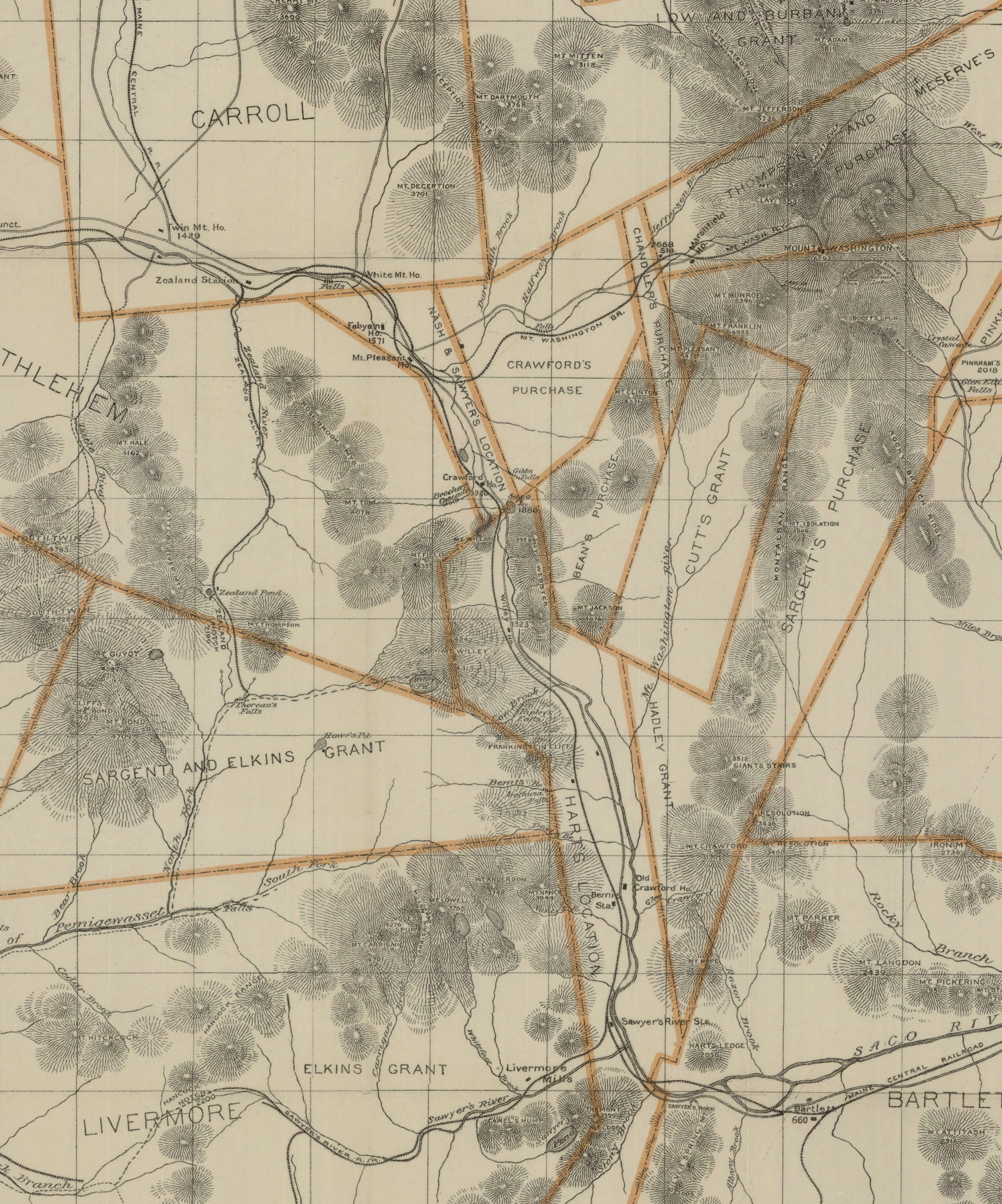
Section of Geo. T. Crawford's map of the White Mountains of New Hampshire, ca. 1896, showing Hart's Location and Nash and Sawyer's Location

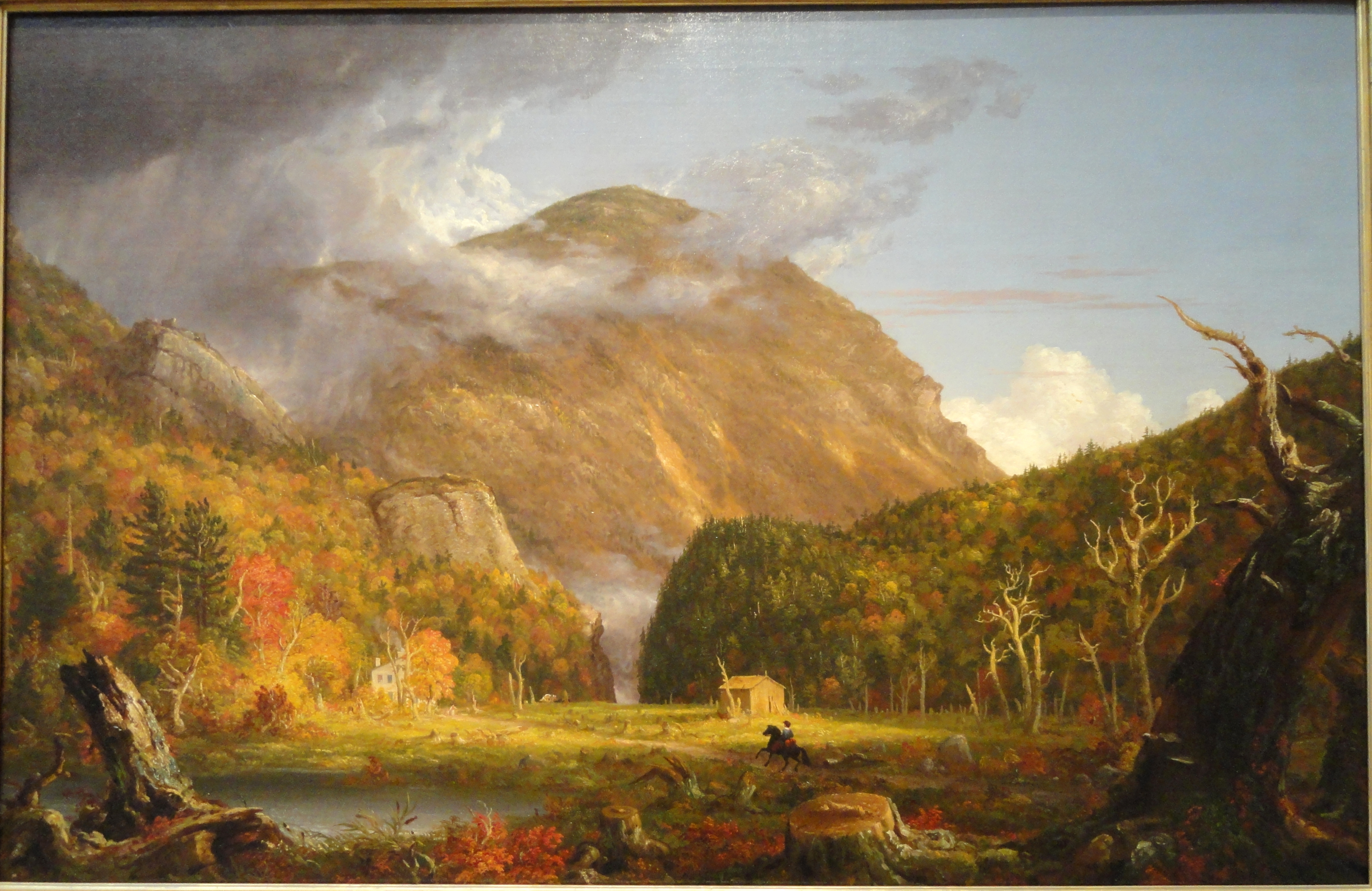
The Notch of the White Mountains (Crawford Notch) by Thomas Cole (1839, oil on canvas). The building is "the Crawford house"

The Crawford family of the White Mountains were a family who moved to New Hampshire's White Mountains in the 1790s from Guildhall, Vermont, and were pioneers in establishing a tourist industry in that area. Abel Crawford and his father-in-law, Eleazar Rosebrook, began the effort, and one of Abel's sons, Ethan Allen Crawford, made significant contributions. Another son, Thomas Jefferson Crawford, continued the work; and Ethan's wife, Lucy, also contributed. Their work was in the area then known as White Mountain Notch, subsequently called Crawford Notch.

Numerous geographical features in the White Mountains are now named after the family.

== Origins ==
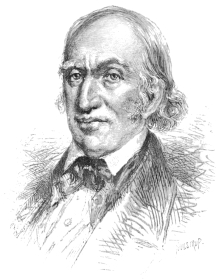
Abel Crawford (1760s–1851), pioneer of tourist industry in the White Mountains of New Hampshire, drawn by Thomas Johnson

The origins of the Crawford family of the White Mountains, lie in the late-18th-century marriage of first cousins Abel Crawford and Hannah Rosebrook.

The date of birth of Abel, who was born in Guildhall, Vermont, is uncertain. (Note: Sources vary regarding Abel Crawford's year of birth. Some say he was aged 75 in 1840, others that he was aged 79 and some specifically say he was born in 1766.) His father was John, the third son of James Crawford, an Irish or Scotch-Irish man who had emigrated to Boston in 1726 and then settled in Union, Connecticut. John married Mary Rosebrook, with whom he had eleven children, including Abel.

Eleazar Rosebrook, who came from Grafton, Massachusetts, was Mary's brother. He had married Hannah Hanes of Brimfield, Massachusetts, in 1772, eventually having four sons and two daughters, including Abel's future wife, Hannah. The Rosebrooks had moved to the remote upper Connecticut River, where Colebrook now stands, but during the American Revolutionary War Eleazar was away, serving in the Continental Army, and his family relocated to Guildhall for safety. On his return from service, Eleazar established a successful farm there.

== Life in the White Mountains ==
=== Beginnings ===
White Mountain Notch, as it was originally called, is a mountain pass that lies between the Presidential and Franconia Ranges of the White Mountains, an area which Kevin Avery described as an "inhospitable, indeed potentially lethal, wilderness" in the years immediately following the American Revolutionary War. Abel moved from Guildhall to settle at the northern end of the notch in 1790 with his wife, Hannah. He bought a cabin, which later became known as "Fabyan" or "Fabyans", from settlers there but soon sold it to his father-in-law, Eleazar Rosebrook, and moved 12 miles (19 km) south through the notch to Hart's Location. It was there that he built the inn, called Crawford House, where his son, Ethan Allen Crawford, was born in 1792.

An alternative chronology to this has Abel Crawford initially moving alone to the notch in 1791, leaving his wife in Guildhall while he constructed a cabin at a spectacular site on Nash and Sawyer's Location at Bretton Woods. Eleazar Rosebrook, who was restless despite the success of his farm in Guildhall, visited and agreed to buy the cabin when Abel decided it was insufficiently remote for his liking. Thus, Abel then moved to the even more spectacular Hart's Location and was joined there by his wife and two young sons, Erastus and Ethan Allen, who had been born in Guildhall in 1792. (Note: In Dickerman's chronology, Erastus had been born prior to Abel leaving Guildhall for Nash and Sawyer's Location, with Ethan Allen born in January 1792 prior to his family joining him in the notch that year; Johnson says both boys were born in 1792. Ethan himself, according to his wife, Lucy, says Erastus was born in 1791.) Eventually comprising Abel, Hannah, eight sons and a daughter, the Crawford family developed the new site, where the present-day Notchland Inn is situated, as a farm.

Eleazar Rosebrook established the first inn at the Notch in 1803 when the state of New Hampshire decided to build a turnpike that connected its northern and southern areas via the mountain pass. (Note: The turnpike through the notch was the Tenth New Hampshire Turnpike, which is now a part of U.S. Route 302.) Such a device had been considered by settlers since the 1760s because people living in Lancaster and the surrounding area of the upper Connecticut River were forced to make a long, difficult detour via Haverhill in order to trade with places such as Portland and Portsmouth. The vast increase in traffic caused by this development gave Eleazar an opportunity to improve his fortunes. He constructed a two-story inn on a mound called Giant's Grave and supplemented it with a sawmill, a gristmill, stables and other buildings. Timothy Dwight IV was an early visitor to Eleazar's property and wrote approvingly of what he had achieved. The location and his reputation for hospitality made it a success, and Abel followed it by building his own inn, Crawford House, at Hart's Location.

=== Further development ===
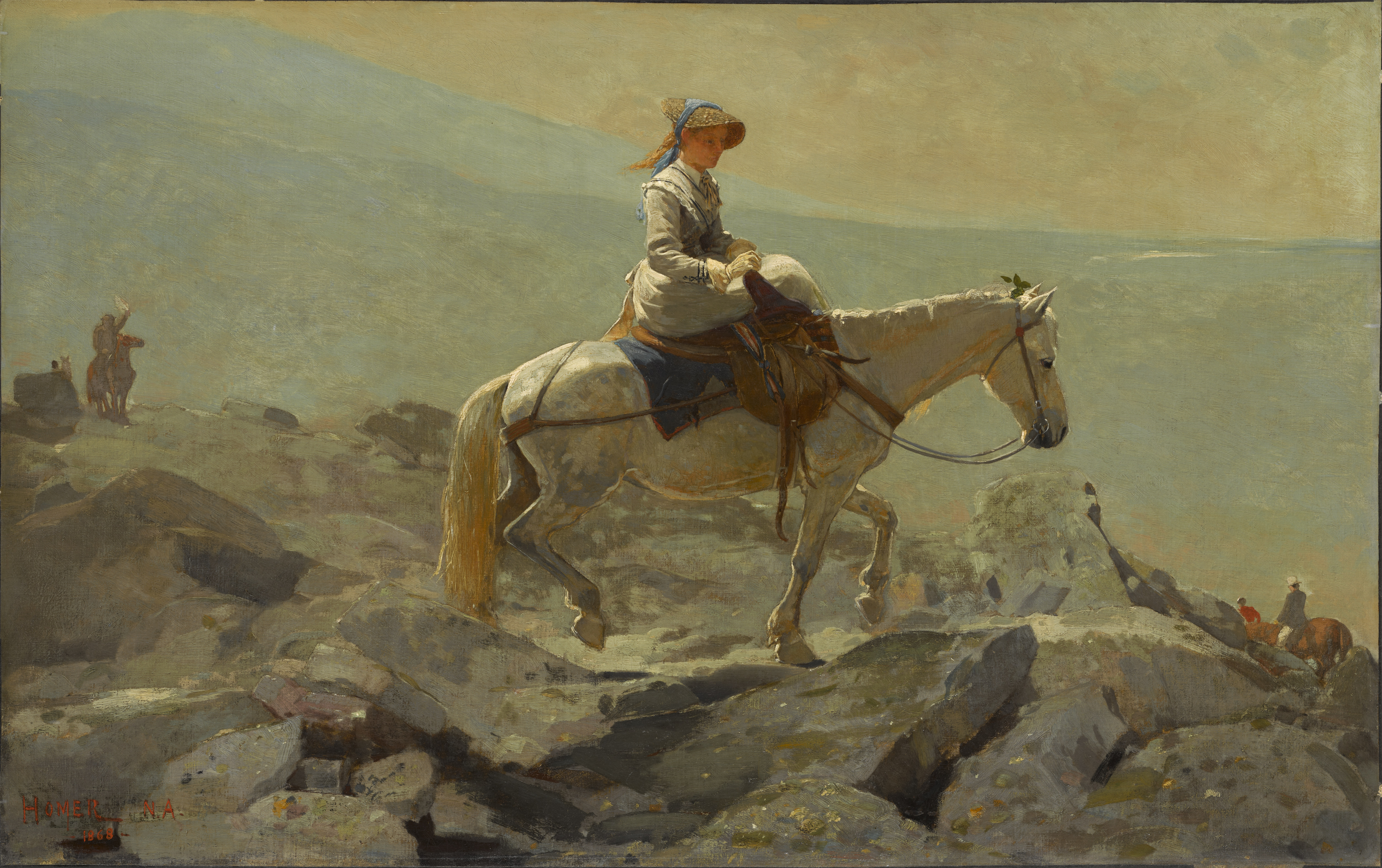
The Bridle Path, White Mountains by Winslow Homer (1868). Not a true-to-life depiction but thought to be a representation of the Crawford Path based on memory, sketches and artistic license.

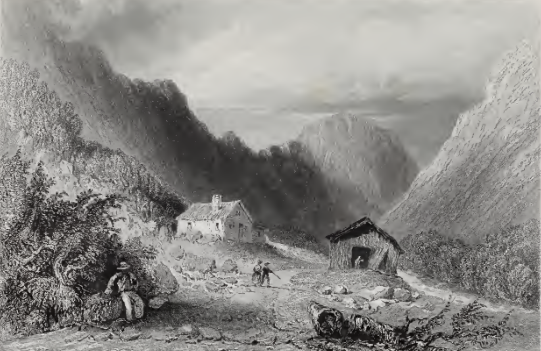
Drawing by W. H. Bartlett of the Willey House, Crawford Notch. Once the home of Ethan Crawford, it later became a tourist attraction following a storm in 1826 which resulted in the deaths of the Willey family and others

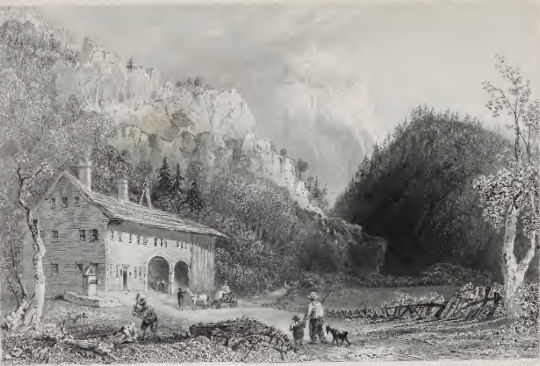
Drawing by W. H. Bartlett of the Notch House, Crawford Notch. Built by Ethan Crawford around 1828 and managed by his brother, Thomas. This is, according to Dona Brown, "One of the best-known images of the White Mountains, combining the looming grandeur of the mountains with old-fashioned comfort and cheer."

Until 1811, when Ethan left to join the army, father and son worked, hunted and fished together in the environs of the Notch. After leaving the army, Ethan was engaged in various jobs in New York state, including road-building and river transportation. He intended to settle in Louisville before deciding to return to the Notch at the request of the ailing Eleazar in 1816. Eleazar had developed cancer of the lip and was too feeble to run his farm and inn without assistance; in return for Ethan's help, Eleazar offered ownership of the property to Ethan. Thus, when Eleazar died in September 1817, Ethan inherited the property and also the mortgage on it, which he increased to develop the business further. He married his cousin, Lucy Howe, in November of the same year, having become close to her when she arrived at Giant's Grave to look after Eleazar, their mutual grandfather. On the night of July 18, 1818, being the same day that Lucy gave birth to their first child, the Old Moosehorn Tavern was destroyed by a fire caused by an unattended candle. There were uninsured losses of US$3000, made worse because payments were still due on the mortgage, but Ethan nonetheless managed to build a smaller replacement building. This cramped replacement may not have been entirely new but in fact one already standing some 1.5 miles (2.4 km) from Giant's Grave, from whence it was moved with the aid of family and friends.

It was as a consequence of the fire that Ethan sought new opportunities to repair his ravaged finances. The area was beginning to attract tourists desirous of reaching the mountain peaks, and in 1819 Abel had already guided a couple of groups up the hills. Ethan was also approached and noted the difficulties that they experienced in negotiating the thickly-wooded terrain. Later that year, he and Abel together eased those problems by clearing woodland and grading a route for the first path to the summit of Mount Washington. Covering a distance of over 8 miles (13 km), beginning at the top of what was then called White Mountain Notch, the path cut through forest past the tree line to reach a ridge near the peak of Bald Mountain, then traversed a bleak ridge and negotiated various other peaks before reaching its goal. It is today known as the Crawford Path, still mostly follows the original route and is considered to be the oldest White Mountains trail in continuous use. It may not, however, have been the first path to the summit: the mineralogist George Gibbs probably commissioned the creation of a crude path, now lost, on the eastern slopes in 1809.

Ethan, who has been described as "prodigiously strong", appears to have been the major worker on the original Crawford Path. The first travelers, guided by Abel, included Samuel Joseph May, who wrote an account of it. (Note: Other people who traveled in Samuel May's group included Caleb Cushing, George Barrell Emerson, Samuel Edmund Sewall, and William Ware.) Ethan developed other trails in the area, including one initiated in 1821 whose route was closely followed later by the Mount Washington Cog Railway and which soon became more popular than the original path. His brother, Thomas Jefferson Crawford, together with guide Joseph Hall, who worked for him, improved the original path by converting it into a bridleway around 1840, allowing Abel, then in his 70s, to become the first person to ride a horse to the summit of the mountain. (Note: While most sources just name Abel as the first person to ride a horse to the summit of Mount Washington, Woodrow Thompson says that he was accompanied by the state geologist Charles Thomas Jackson.) This change to the path was in response to increased competition from facilities by now being developed at Pinkham Notch.

Ethan constructed a shelter for travelers at the summit in 1821 and in 1823 built three stone huts there. At least one of the huts was fitted out with a stove, vegetation for bedding and a sheet of lead on which visitors could write their names with a nail, but they proved too uncomfortable and so he erected a tent capable of holding 18 people. The tent did not survive for long because of the high winds that are a feature of the mountain. (Note: Mount Washington is notorious for its erratic weather. On the afternoon of April 12, 1934, the Mount Washington Observatory recorded a windspeed of 231 miles per hour (372 km/h) at the summit, which was a world record for most of the 20th century.) Also in 1823, despite his precarious financial position, Ethan expanded his provision of accommodation by renting the Old Notch House, which had been built in 1793 and lay close to Abel's home, and by extending the Giant's Grave building.

Ethan was a capable guide for travelers using the trail, assisting surveyors such as a party that included John W. Weeks, botanists such as William Oakes, and, in 1821, the first women to ascend the summit, as well as the author Theodore Dwight. Lucy also had some involvement, making her own first ascent to the summit in 1825. Word of Ethan's abilities and deeds spread, gaining him a heroic status, with incidents such as one where he carried a bear on his shoulders, a feat immortalized in drawings and woodcut prints. Over time, the 6 feet 3 inches (1.91 m)-tall Ethan gained the name "Giant of the Hills"; his father, who probably acted as a guide for the geologist Charles Lyell in the 1840s, was known as the "Patriarch of the Mountains". Abel also acted as the collector of tolls from people traveling over the Jefferson turnpike and, in the early 1830s, his strategic position there caused him to be suggested as someone who might assist authorities in monitoring smugglers who were then particularly active in the area.

Ethan knew how to exploit the attractions of the scenery to his best advantage, one example being that he took to greeting visitors by firing a cannon or blowing a horn at his door so that they could appreciate the natural echo. The number of visitors increased greatly following a natural disaster on August 28, 1826, that was publicized by Dwight in his Northern Traveller guidebook. A summer storm converted the Saco River into a raging torrent through the Notch valley and triggered landslides. The Willey family, who had taken occupation of the Old Notch House, died trying to outrun the water and the terrain was stripped bare, remaining that way for many years after with the house still standing in stark contrast to the desolation. Natural beauty and tragedy combined to entice visitors with an interest in morbid Romanticism and to inspire artists such as Thomas Cole. Dona Brown believes that Cole and such other visitors as Nathaniel Hawthorne used the interest in the tragedy to further their careers, deliberately painting and writing about an area that had suddenly gained national attention. Ethan, too, exploited it by, for example, ensuring that the Willey House was well signposted. (Note: Visitor interest in the effects of the disastrous storm waned over time, despite the efforts of people such as Willey's brother to maintain and profit from it by offering guided tours of the house for a fee. It had become old news.)

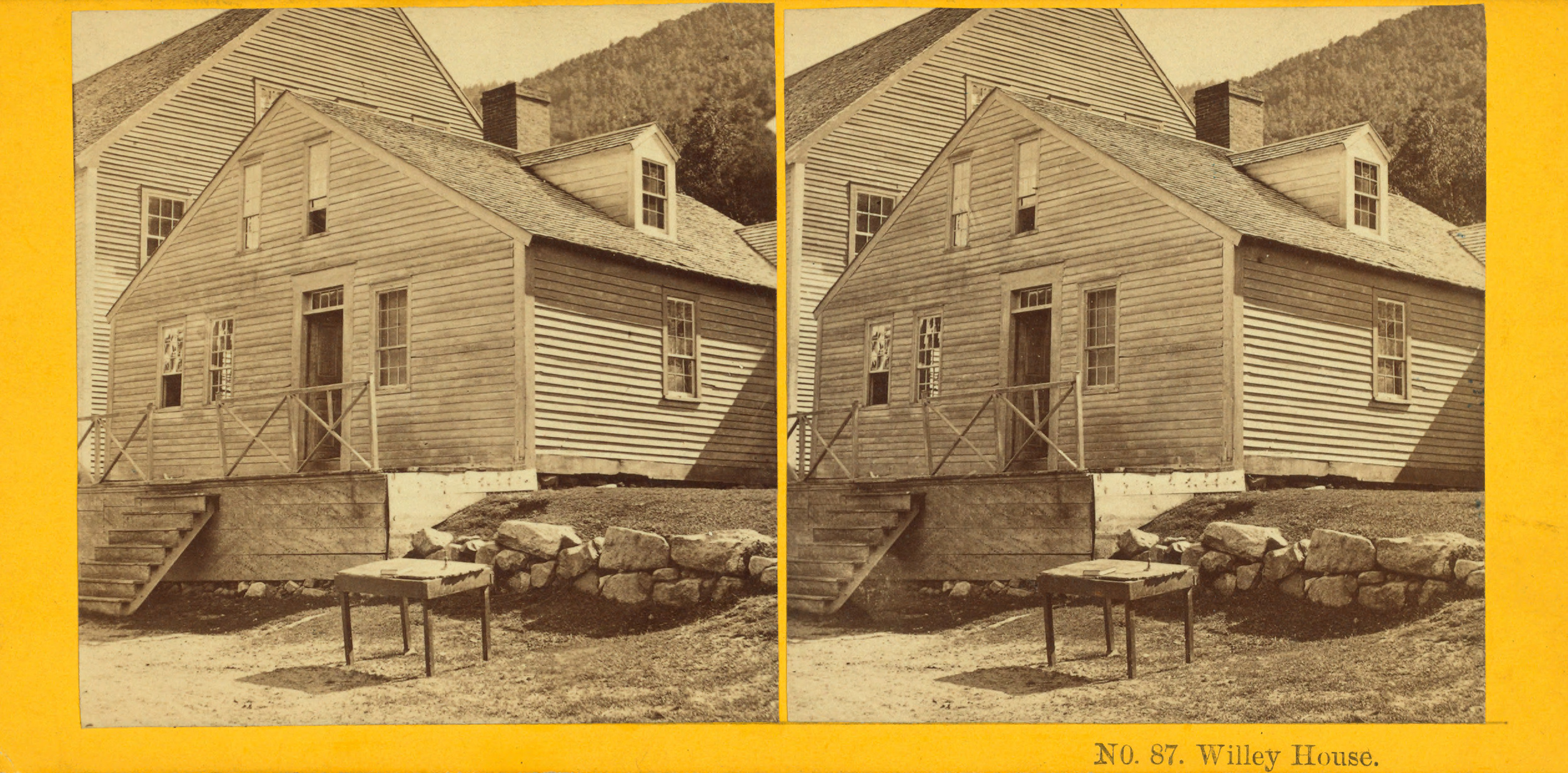
A stereoscopic slide of the Willey House by Kilburn Brothers, ca. 1872. The original building had been significantly extended by that date.

The Crawfords were directly affected by the storm: Ethan's property suffered US$1000 of damage and Abel's farm was wrecked almost beyond repair. However, they were also affected in a positive manner with the subsequent influx of tourists. In 1828, Ethan began construction of a new inn, called the Notch House, at the northern end of the valley, appointing his brother Thomas to run it. The business opened in 1829 and attracted many notable people, including Ralph Waldo Emerson, Henry David Thoreau and Daniel Webster. Ethan guided and hosted Nathaniel Hawthorne for several days in 1832, and Hawthorne later described the hotel in his Sketches from Memory. It was particularly popular with artists because of its stunning setting and, despite being destroyed by fire in 1854, is still well known because of its frequent depiction in their works.

Pavel Cenkl says that the Crawfords were "subsistence farmers, traders, and entrepreneurs". While Abel had apparently planted around 700 apple trees on his land, mostly for the purpose of making cider, by the 1830s Thomas was proposing that his own hotel would be a teetotal establishment.

=== Endings ===
Competition for the tourist trade, which from the outset had been the monopoly of the Crawfords, increased with the greater interest in the area that followed the Willey disaster of 1826. The type of visitor changed, too, and the people who now flocked to the mountains disdained the relatively crude accommodation that the Crawfords could offer. Ethan took out a further mortgage in 1832 to finance a new two-story wing for the Old Moosehorn Tavern, hoping that it would counter the competition now coming from the new White Mountain House hotel. He continued to develop new trails and also tamed some animals to amuse visitors, as well as adding a bowling alley and dance floor, but he became less interested in acting as a guide and often employed people to do that for him. He developed rheumatism and a tumor that caused him constant pain, leading him to attempt unsuccessfully to sell his business in 1835. No-one was prepared to offer a price that would pay his debts but during this time he also befriended Samuel Bemis, a dentist and early photographer from Boston through whom he found a doctor who was able to relieve some of the tumor-related pain.

Ethan and Lucy had struggled financially since the fire of 1818, having taken on more debt for their various projects. They became vulnerable to the activities of land speculators and Ethan was eventually imprisoned for non-payment of debt. Unable to pay the mortgage that he had taken out in 1832, the couple left the area in 1837 after years of financial struggle. Their property was sold to repay their debts. Horace Fabyan leased the original farm and then bought it outright in 1841; he renamed the inn as Mount Washington House. (Note: Horace Fabyan upgraded and extended the Old Moosehorn Tavern, which he renamed Mount Washington House, after his purchase in 1841. It burned down in a fire in 1853 and the derelict site was bought by Sylvester Marsh in 1864. As a partner in the Mount Washington Hotel Company, he eventually managed to open a hotel there in 1873, called Fabyan House. A merchant and speculator rather than a mountain man, he also took control of the Willey House in 1845 and converted that into a 50-bed hotel.)

Unhappy with being distant from the mountains, Ethan and Lucy returned from their new abode in Guildhall in 1843, renting and re-opening the abandoned White Mountain House hotel, (Note: According to Johnson, White Mountain House was a hotel built by another descendant of Eleazar Rosebrook. However, the source for this is George Drew Merrill's 1888 History of Coos County, New Hampshire, which refers to Phineas Rosebrook Jr. as completing the construction. According to Bryant Tolles, the accuracy of Merrill's work "may be legitimately questioned".) which stood about 1 mile (1.6 km) distant from their old home. Meanwhile, Ethan's sister, Hannah, had married Nathaniel T. P. Davis and the couple lived with Abel while continuing the family's connection with tourism. In 1844–1845, Davis constructed a new horse route from Crawford House inn at Hart's Location to the Mount Washington summit, via Mount Crawford, and managed the inn for some time. Although that 14-mile (23 km) route was never popular, a path created by Thomas for the ascent of Mount Willard led to the creation of one that is used today.

Ethan, who had at least two daughters and a son, died on June 22, 1846, at White Mountain House. Either in the same year or the one prior to it, Lucy published The History of the White Mountains from the First Settlement of Upper Coos and Pequaket, (Note: The History of the White Mountains from the First Settlement of Upper Coos and Pequaket was revised and expanded in 1860. According to Christopher Johnson, "it was and remains a beloved White Mountain classic.") which was written in Ethan's voice. Pavel Cenkl says that Lucy intended the book to be in large part a paean to Ethan, building up his image so that more people might ask him to be their guide, although just as with the trails and inns, it was subsequent investors in the area's tourism industry who benefited from interest in it. The Crawfords had long had a reputation for eloquent story-telling about the mountains, although some people questioned the veracity of what they said. Following the death of Ethan, people began referring to White Mountain Notch as Crawford Notch.

Towards the end of his life, aged in his 80s, Abel Crawford was twice elected from Coos County to the New Hampshire House of Representatives, a part of the state legislature. He died in 1851 and is buried with his wife, Hannah at Notchland, a house built by Bemis at Hart's Location which still stands today as the Notchland Inn. Bemis had bought the property, on which Abel's Crawford House stood, in 1856 but the actual Crawford House building was probably torn down in 1900. Ethan and Lucy, who died in 1869, are buried in the same graveyard as Eleazar and his wife, not far from the Cog railway. Continued financial difficulties meant that Thomas Crawford and Nathaniel Davis both lost their properties, Notch House and Mount Crawford House, respectively, in the 1850s.

== Legacy ==
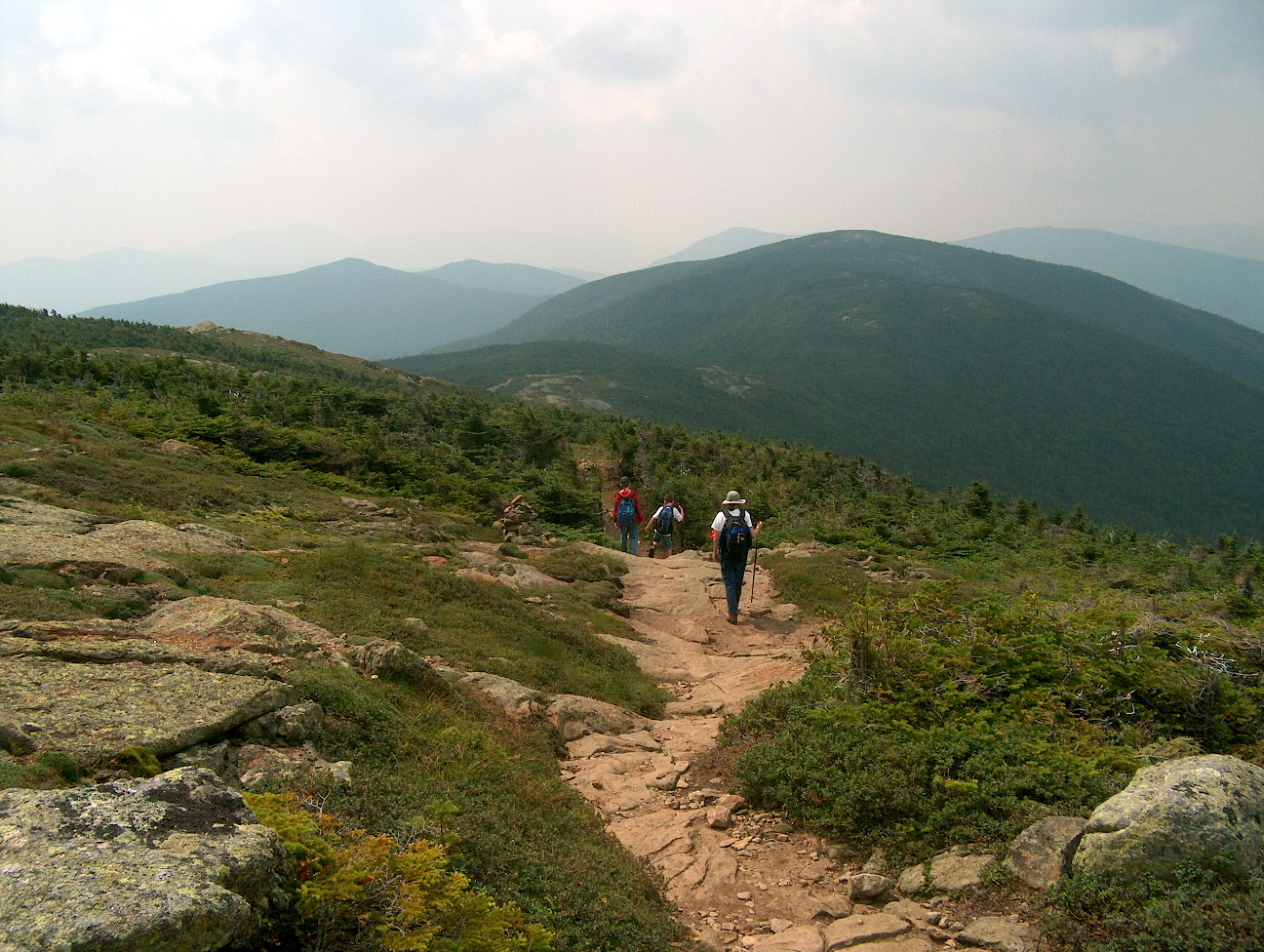
The Crawford Path between Mount Pierce and Mount Eisenhower in 2004

The significance of the Crawford Path is considerable. Christopher Johnson notes:

The Crawford Path was a major milestone, for it marked the birth of wilderness experience as a recreational activity in the White Mountains. Increasing numbers of visitors used the trail, a sign that Americans were beginning to view the mountain wilderness as worthy of exploration for personal, aesthetic, and scientific reasons. As the Crawfords cleared more trails through the White Mountains, they enhanced the intrinsic value of the mountain wilderness by opening up access to it.

By the mid-1850s there were numerous hotels in the White Mountains, including four that travel guide writer John H. Spaulding described at the time as "mammoth". (Note: The "mammoth" hotels were the Alpine House at Gorham, Glen House, Notch House and White Mountain House.) There were also numerous transport routes to enable access from the cities, notably the Atlantic and St. Lawrence Railroad that had been extended to Gorham.

Aside from Crawford Notch and the Crawford Path, the Crawfords are commemorated in the names of Mount Crawford, due to a suggestion made by Bemis, and also in the unincorporated area known as Crawford's Purchase, which is land east of Fabyan and Bretton Woods that was bought by Ethan Allen Crawford and brothers Thomas and Nathaniel Abbott in 1834. Other namings include Ethan Pond and Crawford Brook, as well as Mount Tom and Mount Tom Brook, which were both named after Thomas. Guidebooks have also extolled the virtues of Abel and Ethan.

The family's involvement in constructing trails continued with the work of Ethan A. Crawford II, who had an involvement in building a route at the Jefferson Notch pass near Mount Jefferson, over which he drove Chester B. Jordan, the then Governor of New Hampshire, at its opening in 1902.

== See also ==
- Crawford Notch State Park – State park in New Hampshire
- Fabyan House – Grand hotel in the United States destroyed by fire in 1951
- New Hampshire Historical Marker No. 30 – The Crawford Family
- New Hampshire Historical Marker No. 87 – Crawford House
- White Mountain art – 19th-century art depicting New Hampshire, US
