= Nash & Sawyer Location, New Hampshire =

Coordinates: 44°15.3′N 71°26.5′W

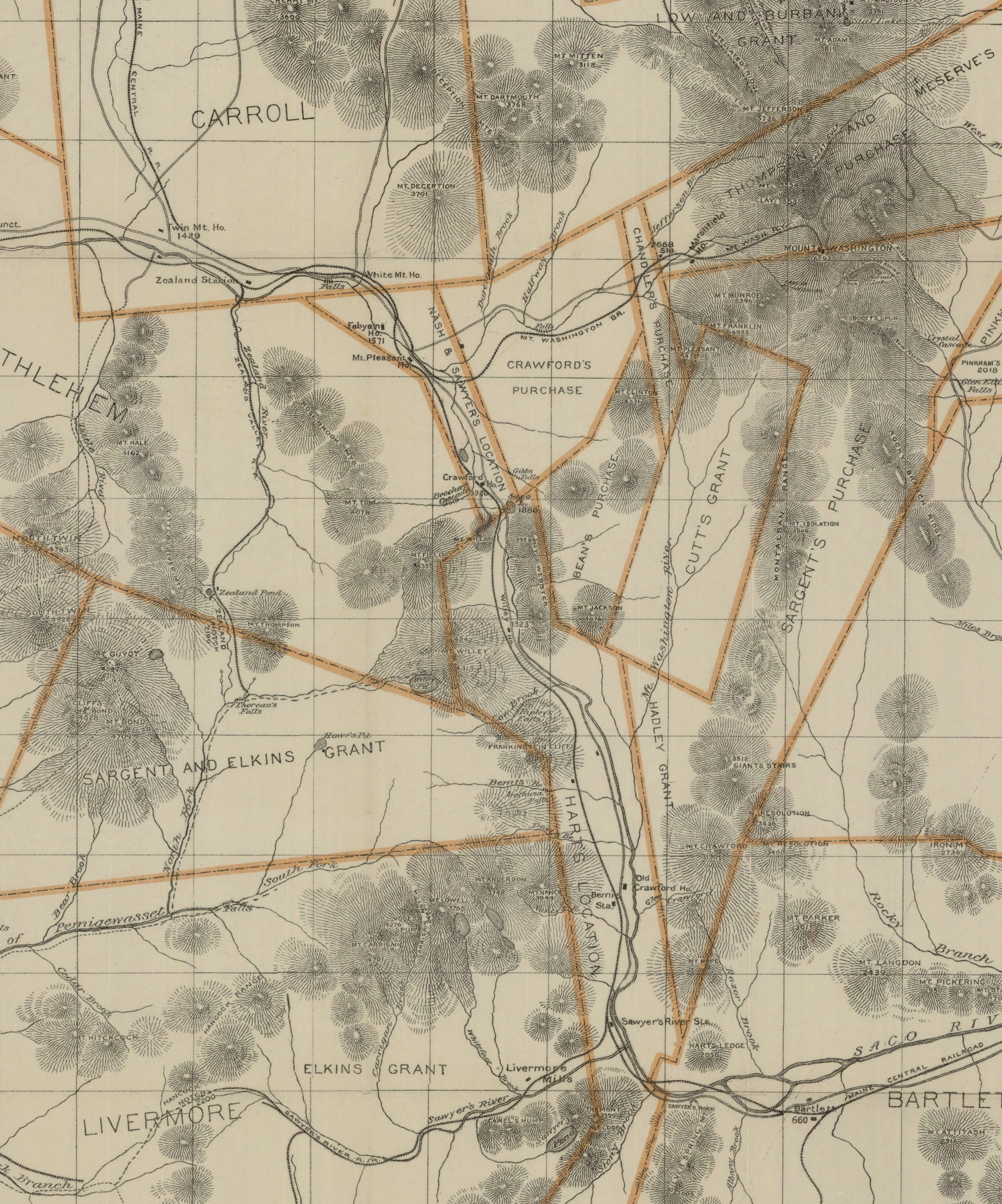
Section of Geo. T. Crawford's map of the White Mountains of New Hampshire, circa 1896, showing Nash & Sawyer's Location and Hart's Location

Nash & Sawyer Location, New Hampshire, is a historic designation of part of Coos County, which was shown on the 1896 topographic map of the area north of Crawford Notch. It contained the areas now known as Bretton Woods and Fabyans, each annexed by the town of Carroll before 1935.

In 1771, Timothy Nash and Benjamin Sawyer proved that a horse could be brought through the pass, thereby showing that a road may be feasible as well. Sawyer Pond (Bemis Lake) and the Sawyer River, near Notchland, are also named for Benjamin Sawyer.

== See also ==
- Crawford family of the White Mountains
- Defunct placenames of New Hampshire
- Lancaster, New Hampshire, reference to early grantees Sawyer and Nash
- Samuel Bemis, another local pioneer, owner of Notchland
- New Hampshire Historical Marker No. 186: Sawyer's Rock
