= Mount Crawford (New Hampshire) =

Mountain in New Hampshire, United States

- Mt. Crawford as seen from the northeast

Highest point
- Elevation: 3,119 ft (951 m)
- Prominence: 259 ft (79 m)
- Coordinates: 44°08′11″N 71°19′56″W

Geography
- Location: Coos County, New Hampshire, U.S.
- Parent range: Montalban Ridge
- Topo map: USGS Stairs Mountain

Mount Crawford is a mountain located in Coos County, New Hampshire, in the United States. The mountain is on a spur of Montalban Ridge within the White Mountains and overlooks Crawford Notch. It is accessible via the Davis Path, which climbs from Crawford Notch near the Notchland Inn. The Davis Path continues north up Montalban Ridge to Mount Washington.

Mount Crawford is in the Presidential Range–Dry River Wilderness. It is within the Saco River watershed, with the northern slopes draining to Sleeper Brook, the southern slopes draining to Raxor Brook, and the western slopes draining directly to the Saco. To the east is the connecting ridge to Mount Resolution on the crest of Montalban Ridge.

The Davis Path is named after its creator, Nathaniel T. P. Davis, who was the husband of Hannah Crawford. The couple lived at the time with Hannah's father, Abel Crawford, who owned the Crawford House inn at Hart's Location. Davis managed the inn for some time.

== See also ==
- List of mountains of New Hampshire
- White Mountain National Forest
