= Fabyan House =

Grand hotel in the United States destroyed by fire in 1951

Coordinates: 44.26317°N 71.45856°W

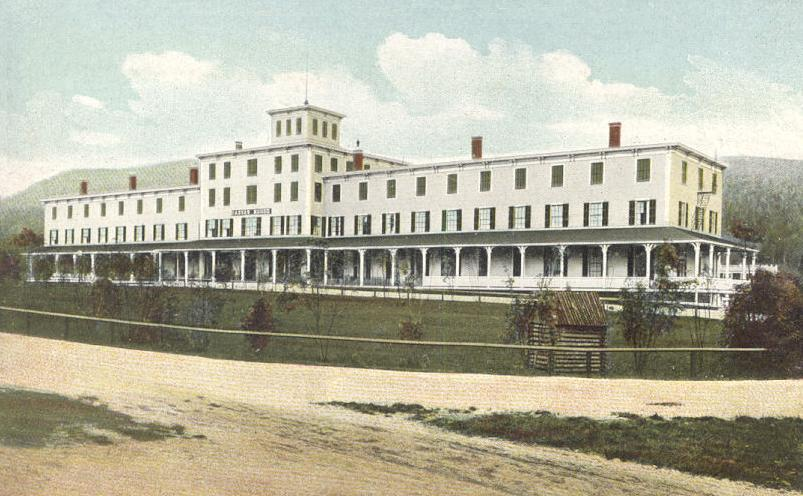
Fabyan House in 1908

Fabyan House was a grand hotel in the White Mountains of New Hampshire, constructed by Sylvester Marsh who also built the Mount Washington Cog Railway. The hotel burned during construction in 1868 and was rebuilt in 1873. It was destroyed by fire on September 19, 1951.

In 1841, Horace Fabyan bought outright the Old Moosehorn Tavern, which he had been leasing since 1837. It had previously been owned and run by Ethan Allen Crawford after being initially created by his grandfather, Eleazar Rosebrook. He renamed the inn as Mount Washington House and both upgraded and extended it. It burned down in a fire in 1853 and the derelict site was bought by Sylvester Marsh in 1864. Marsh's first attempt to build a hotel on the site came to nothing when the part-complete building burned in 1868 during construction. After transferring the property to the Mount Washington Hotel Company, in which he was a partner, it was possible to raise US$200,000 for construction and Marsh eventually managed to open a hotel there in 1873, called Fabyan House. The construction was not without controversy because such a large enterprise necessitated the levelling of a well-loved local feature called Giant's Grave, which was a prominent mound on the site.

The 500-person hotel had a livery stable, post office, bowling alley, and billiard hall. Its parlour measured 3,500 square feet (330 m^{2}) and its dining room was 6,000 square feet (560 m^{2}). In particular after 1878, when it was leased by the Barron family, the hotel gained a reputation for its hospitality. It was also known for being welcoming to a large number of Jewish guests, a rarity at the time. It provided views of Mount Washington. A fire destroyed it on September 19, 1951.

The area was served at Fabyan Station by the Boston, Concord & Montreal Railroad from 1874 and the Portland & Ogdensburg Railroad the following year. The place name "Fabyan" is still in use at the location of the hotel in the town of Carroll, New Hampshire, one mile northwest of Bretton Woods; the location is now the junction of U.S. Route 302 and the Base Station Road leading to the Cog Railway. The Conway Scenic Railroad now offers rail excursions from North Conway through Crawford Notch as far as Fabyan Station.

The Fabyan was one of many grand hotels built during the second half of the 19th century in the area.

== Gallery ==
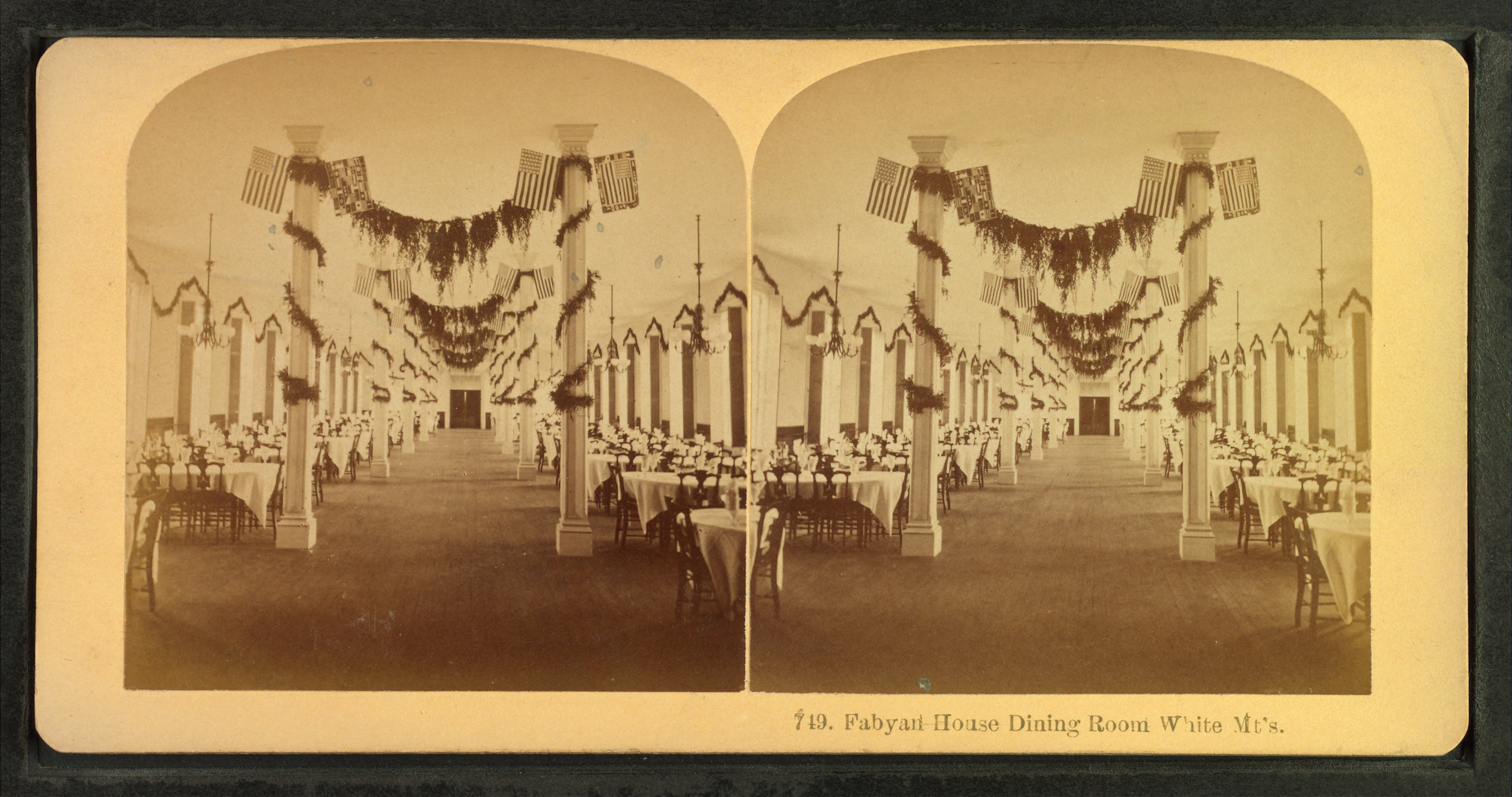
Fabyan House dining room

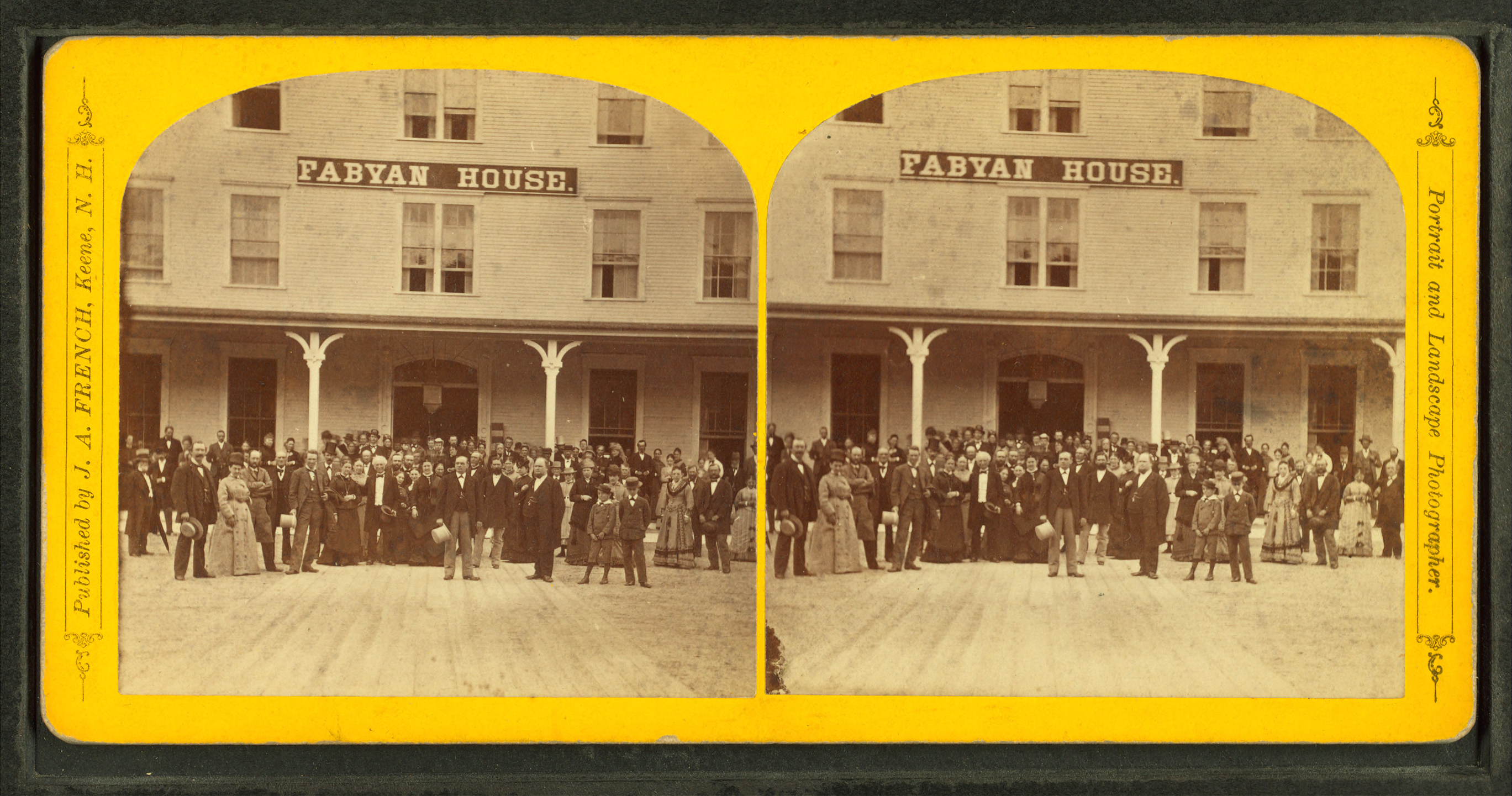
Stereoscopic image of the Fabyan House piazza

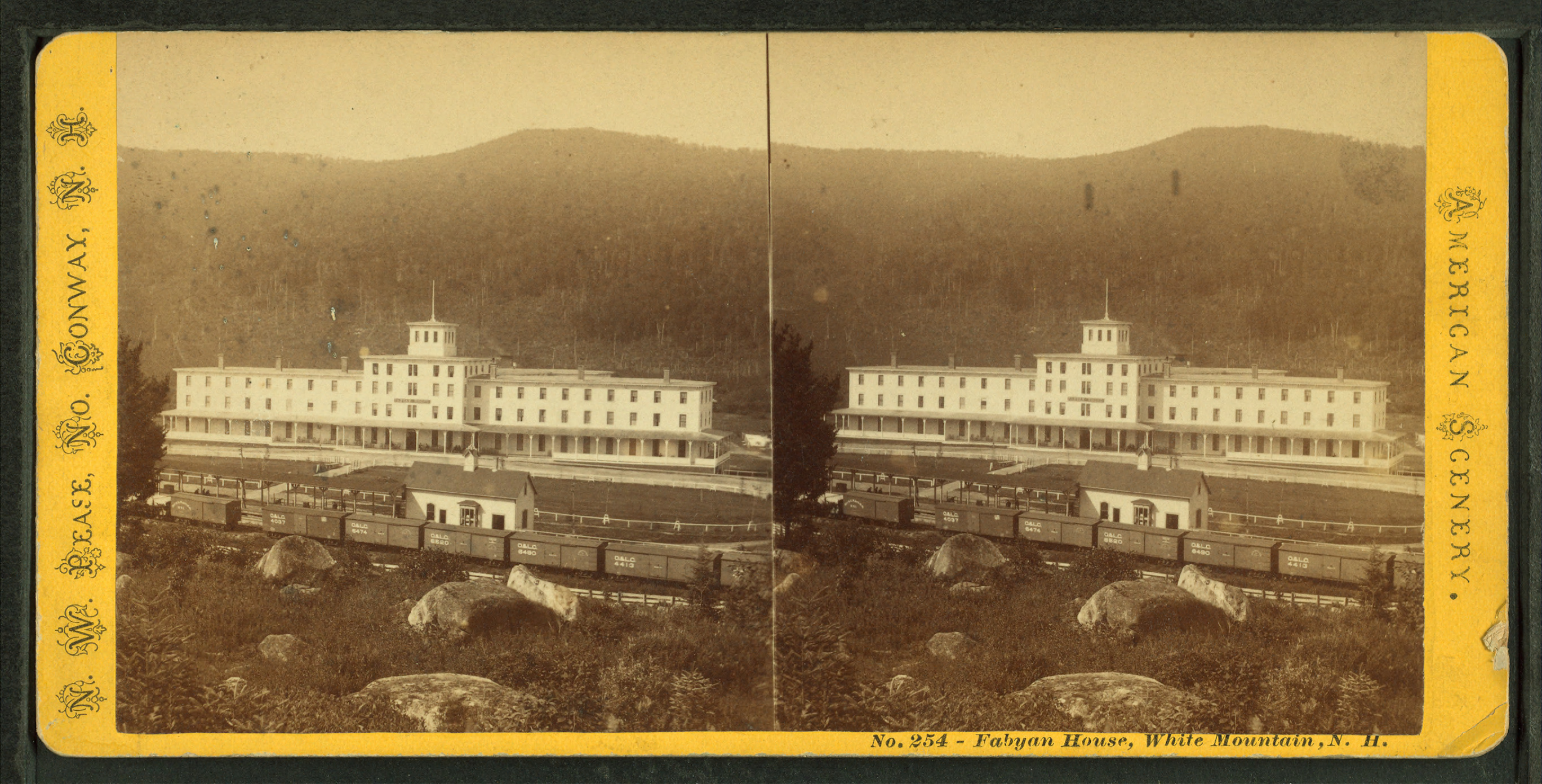
Train line and the Fabyan House by N.W. Pease

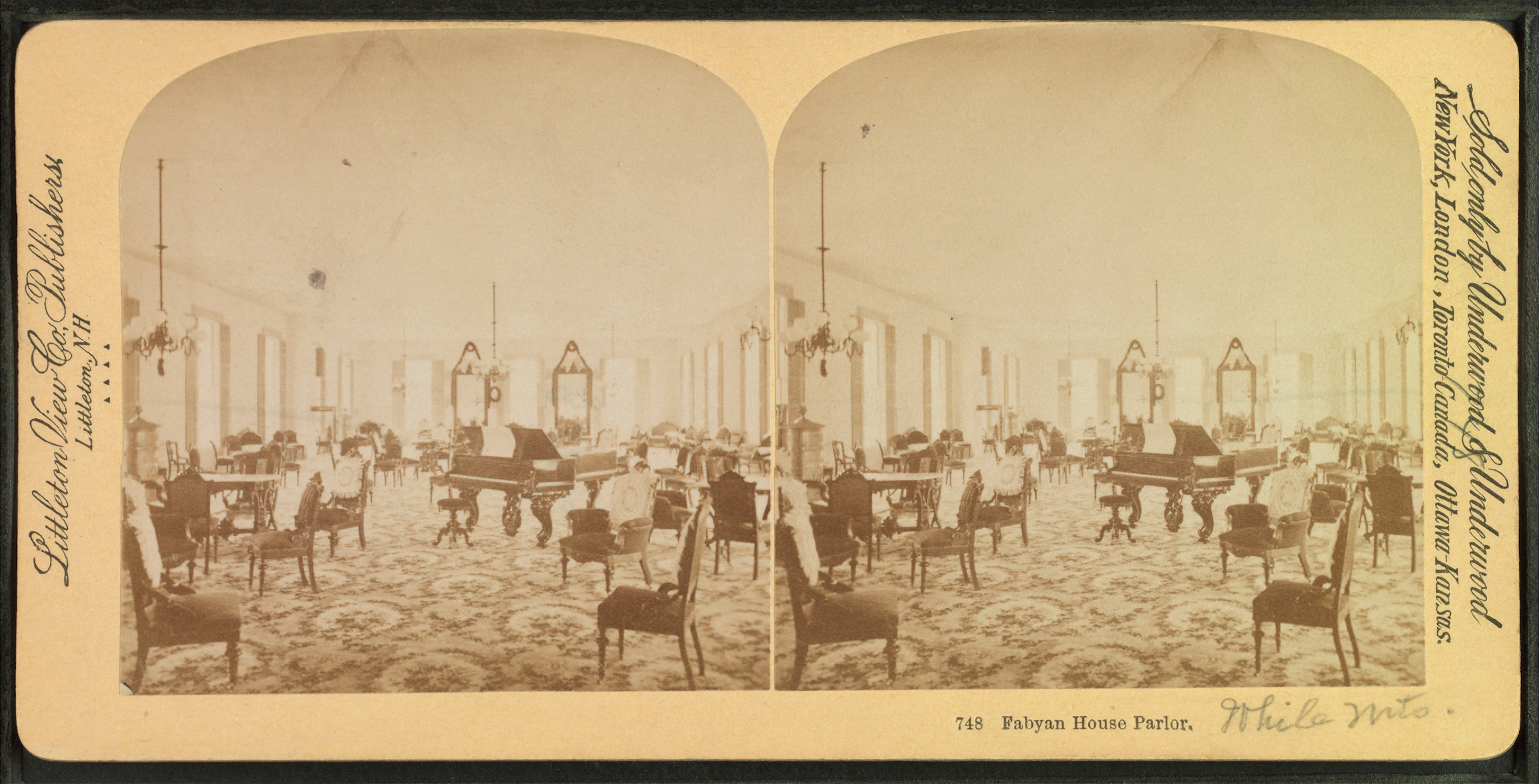
Parlor

== See also ==
- Glen House, a grand hotel near the base of Mount Washington
- Mount Pleasant House (New Hampshire), built in 1875 and demolished in 1939
- Mount Washington Hotel, built in 1902 and still in use
