= Arethusa Falls =

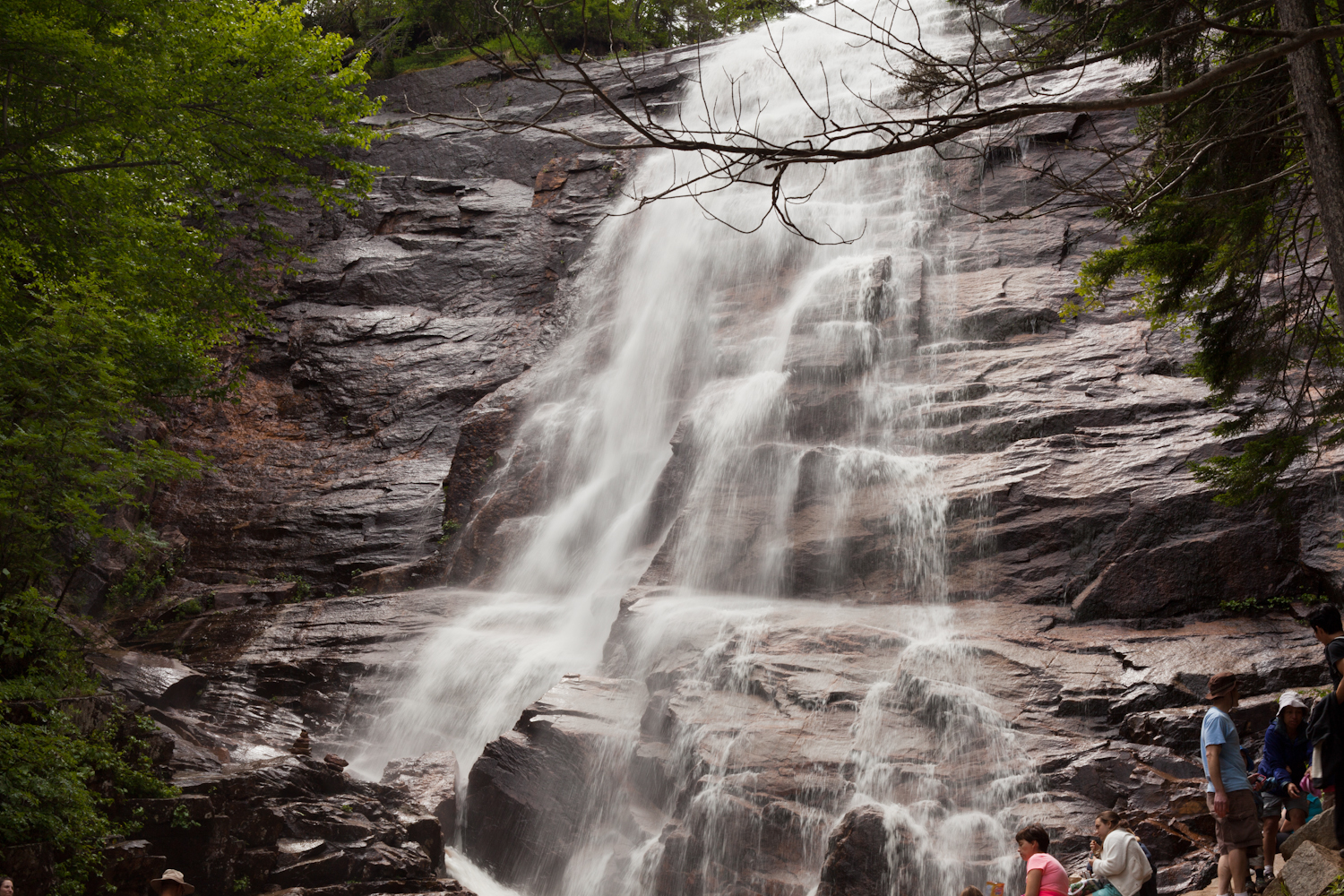
- Interactive map of Arethusa Falls
- Location: Hart's Location, New Hampshire
- Coordinates: 44°08′53″N 71°23′07″W
- Type: Horsetail
- Total height: 140 feet (43 m)
- Watercourse: Bemis Brook

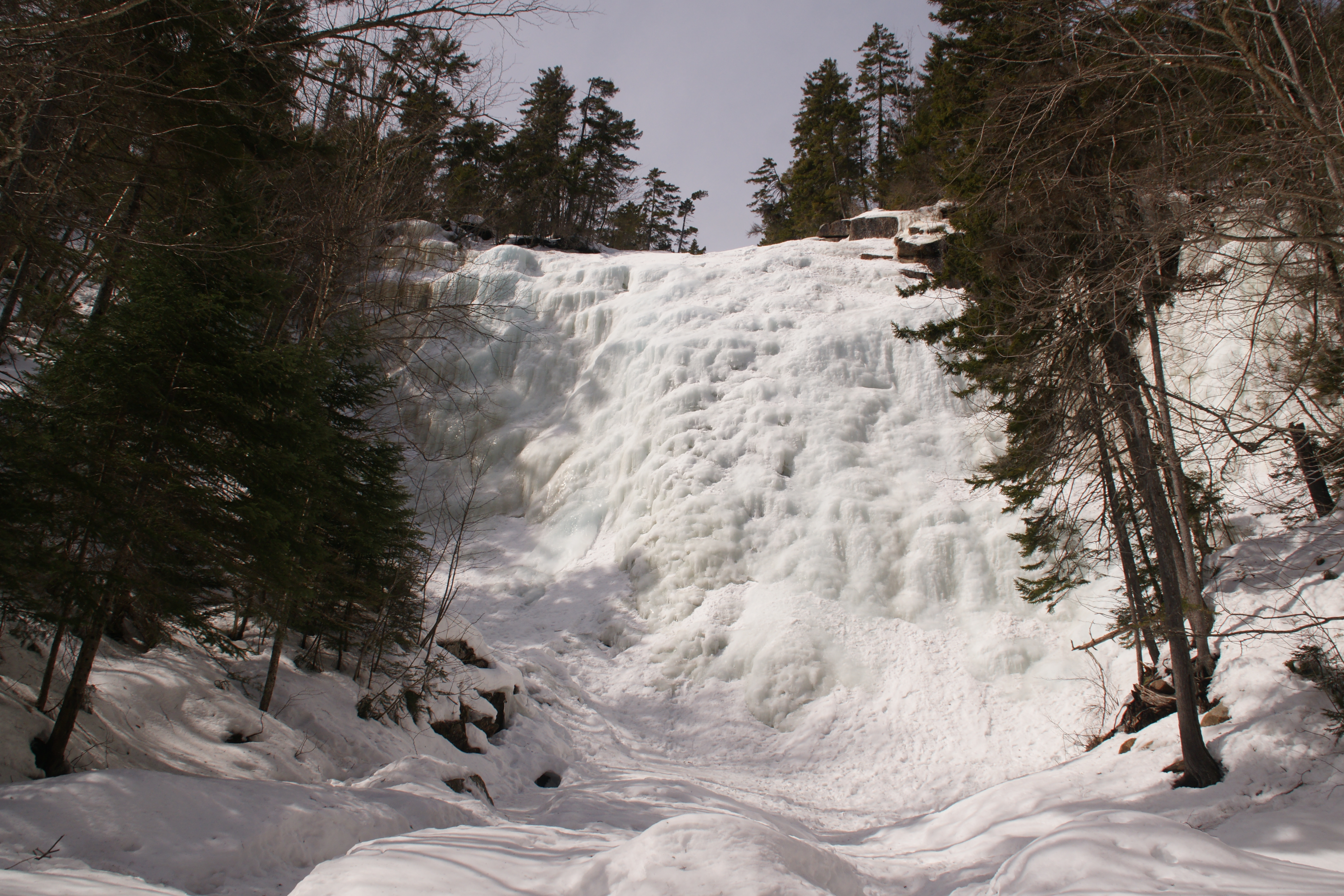
Arethusa Falls in winter

Arethusa Falls is a waterfall in the White Mountains of New Hampshire in the United States. The waterfall occurs when the headwaters of Bemis Brook tumble over a granite cliff on the western slope of Crawford Notch. Arethusa holds the distinction of being the tallest single-drop waterfall in New Hampshire; some high-angle cascades surpass it in height, such as the Mahoosuc Range's seasonal Dryad Falls.

Arethusa Falls was discovered by Edward Tuckerman in 1875. It was named after the nymph Arethusa, daughter of Nereus. At the time, the falls were measured to be 176 feet (54 m) tall, but the Appalachian Mountain Club now estimates the height at 140 feet (43 m).

The falls are located within Crawford Notch State Park and are accessible by means of the 1.5-mile-long (2.4 km) Arethusa Falls Trail from U.S. Route 302.

== See also ==
- List of waterfalls
