= The History of the White Mountains =

1846 book by Lucy Crawford

The History of the White Mountains from the First Settlement of Upper Coos and Pequaket was written by Lucy Crawford and first published in 1846 with a revised edition published in 1883, and an expanded edition written in 1860 but not published until 1966.

Lucy Howe was a first cousin of Ethan Allen Crawford, whom she married in November 1817. The couple had met while caring for their ailing grandfather, Eleazar Rosebrook, a pioneering hotelier at Crawford Notch in the White Mountains of New Hampshire, US. Their marriage took place months after the death of Eleazar, whose property Ethan had been given. The couple spent many years in the area, with a brief time living at Guildhall, Vermont, and through much of it they were pioneers in the development of tourism there. Ill-health eventually took its toll on Ethan and during his final years he told Lucy of many episodes from his life which she was able to turn into a book about both him and the area. Ethan died on 22 June 1846 and the book was published soon after. Lucy died in 1869.

Written in Ethan's voice, the 1846 edition, which Pavel Cenkl believes Lucy intended to be in large part a paean to Ethan, building up his image so that more people might ask him to be their mountain guide, did not sell particularly well. Crawford wrote a revised version around 1860 that expanded the scope so that it contained more about the area, effectively reducing the concentration on Ethan's own life. This version was kept in the family until finally being published in 1966, with the editorial assistance of Stearns Morse. Lucy had been unable to afford publication, although she did eventually manage to pay for some illustrations that she had commissioned for the project.

Christopher Johnson says "it was and remains a beloved White Mountain classic". and that the book is of a similar genre to those that recount tales of American pioneers such as Davy Crockett and Daniel Boone.
