= Mount Willard (New Hampshire) =

Mountain in the U.S. state of New Hampshire

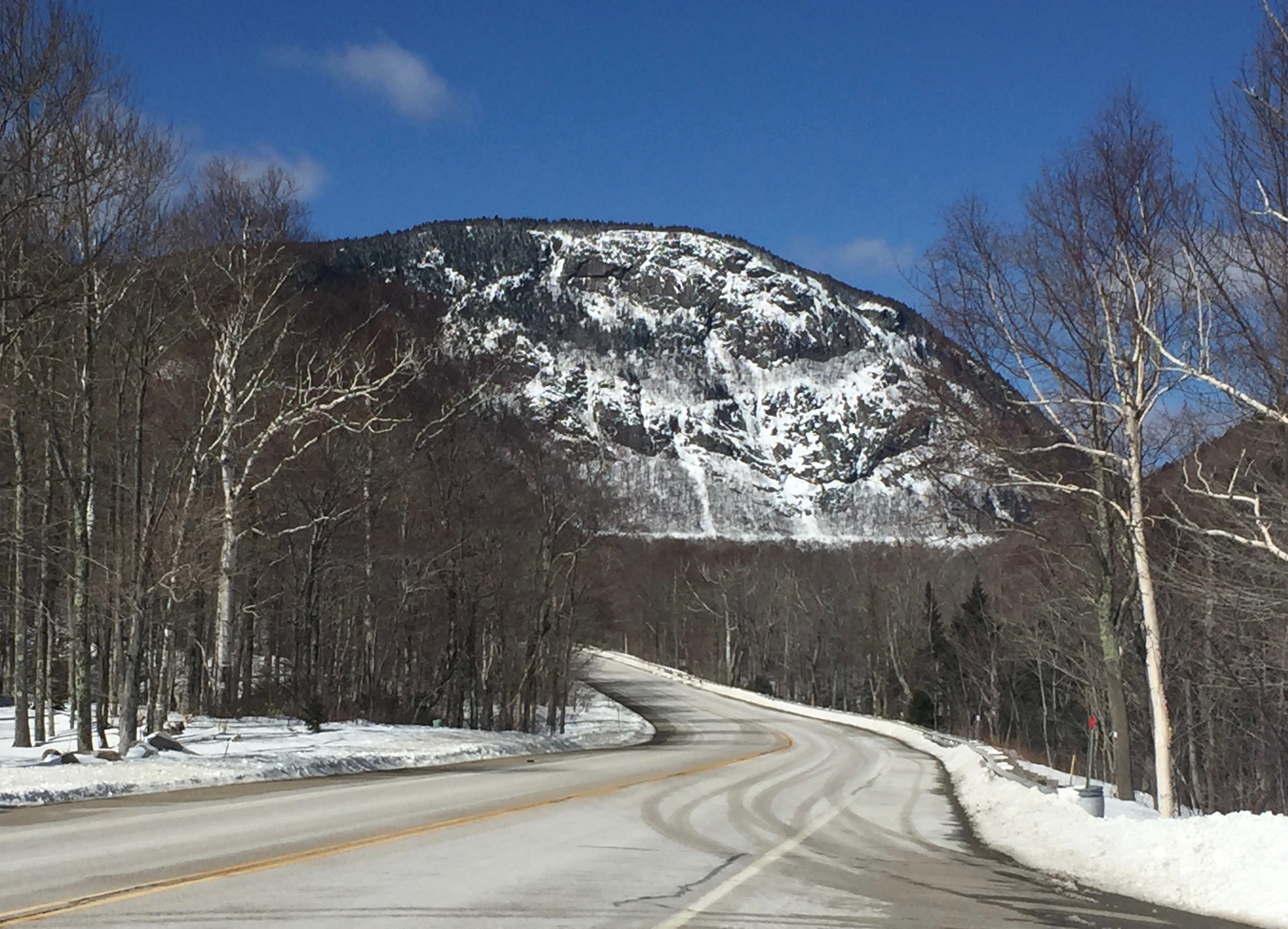
- Mt. Willard overlooking U.S. Route 302

Highest point
- Elevation: 2,865 ft (873 m)
- Prominence: 265 ft (81 m)
- Coordinates: 44°12′14″N 71°24′47″W

Geography
- Location within New Hampshire Location within the United States
- Location: Hart's Location, Carroll County, New Hampshire, U.S.
- Parent range: White Mountains

Climbing
- Normal route: Mount Willard Trail

Mount Willard, elevation 2,865 feet (873 m), is a mountain located in Carroll County, New Hampshire, United States. The summit is located in the town of Hart's Location in Crawford Notch State Park. The summit provides excellent views and is accessible via the Mount Willard Trail.

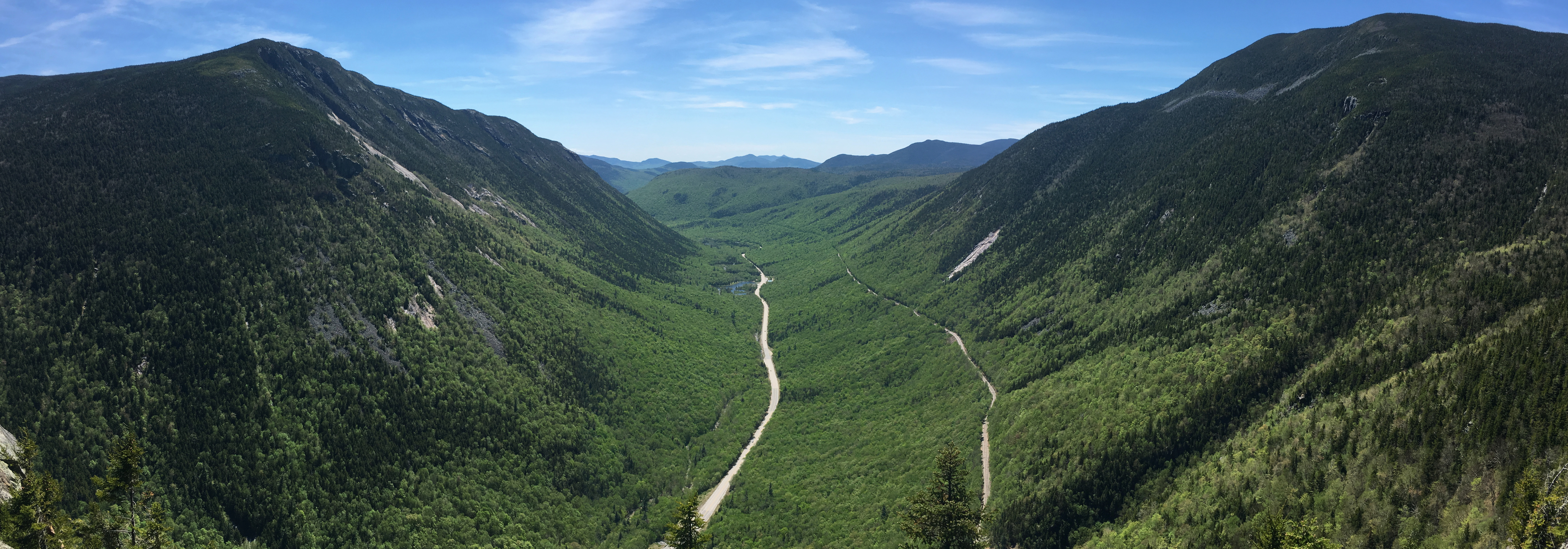
The view from the top of the Mount Willard Trail

The Mount Willard Trail, "a relatively steep day hike," is a 3.1-mile (5.0 km) long out-and-back with an elevation gain of 895 feet (273 m). Dogs are able to use this trail, and it has been rated as child friendly.
