= Crawford Depot (Carroll, New Hampshire) =

- U.S. National Register of Historic Places
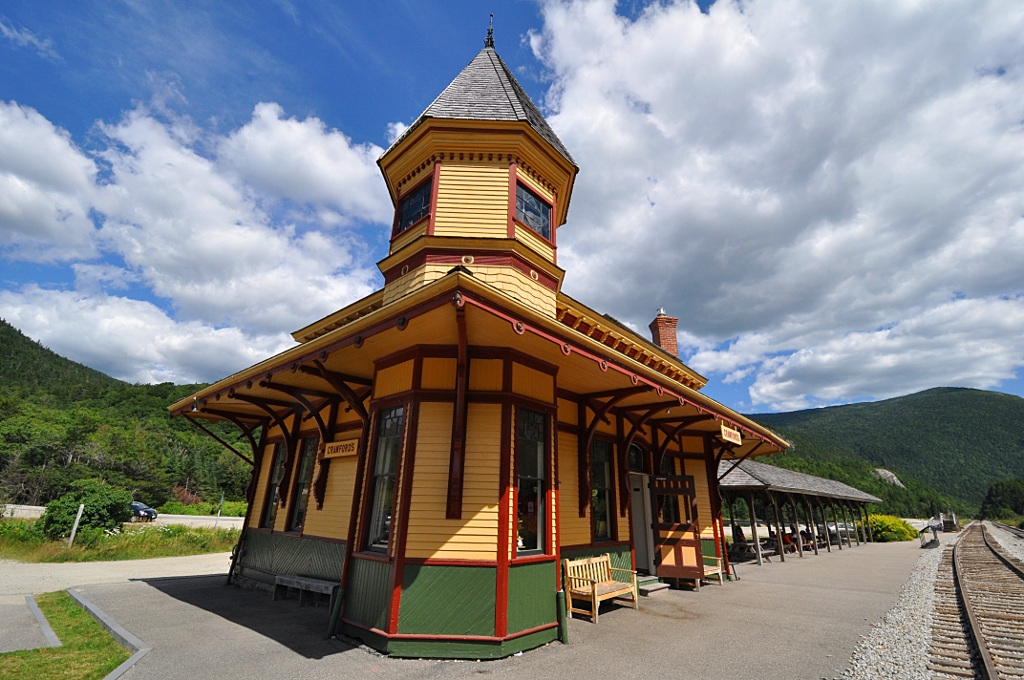
- The restored depot in 2012

- Location within New Hampshire Location within the United States
- Location: at the top of Crawford Notch, US 302, Bretton Woods, New Hampshire
- Coordinates: 44°13′04″N 71°24′40″W
- Area: less than one acre
- Built: 1891
- Architect: Maine Central Railroad
- Architectural style: Queen Anne
- NRHP reference No.: 82001672
- Added to NRHP: April 29, 1982

Crawford Depot, also known as Maine Central Passenger Railway Station, is a historic passenger railroad station at the top of Crawford Notch in the Bretton Woods area of the town of Carroll, New Hampshire. Built in 1891, it is a surviving emblem of the importance of the railroad in the area's history as a tourist destination, and is one of the finest examples of Queen Anne railroad architecture in northern New England. Now home to a visitors center operated by the Appalachian Mountain Club, it was listed on the National Register of Historic Places in 1982. It is also the northern terminus of most trains on the "Mountaineer" service of the Conway Scenic Railroad.

== Description and history ==
Crawford Depot is located a short way north of the height of land of Crawford Notch, a glacially formed gorge in New Hampshire's White Mountains carrying the Saco River southward from its headwaters at Saco Lake. The depot is set with United States Route 302 to the east, at the northwestern end of Saco Lake, and the railroad tracks formerly of the Maine Central Railroad Mountain Division to the west. The Appalachian Mountain Club's Crawford Notch Highland Center is located just to the north.

The depot is a small rectangular single-story wood-frame structure, with a hip roof. The main roof has a cornice studded with sawn brackets, but only covers the structure. A lower roof provides shelter around the exterior for pedestrians; it is supported by large knee brackets, and has a band of decorative moulding at the edge. An octagonal turret projects from the building's northwestern corner. The building exterior is clad in a variety of wooden clapboards and shingles. The main entrance is on the track side. The interior has wooden finishes, and includes a stone fireplace.

The railroad line through Crawford Notch was completed and opened in 1875 by the Portland and Ogdensburg Railroad, and had a transformative effect on the local economy. Tourists were drawn in large numbers to the area's scenic beauty, and large resort hotels were built at the top of the notch to satisfy this demand. The only one to survive is the Mount Washington Hotel, the others having succumbed to fire or demolition. (The AMC's Highland Center is on the location of the Crawford House hotel, which burned in 1977.) The Portland and Ogdensburg was taken over by the Maine Central Railroad in 1888, and this depot was built in 1891. It was one of the most elaborate stations built by that railroad's Mountain Division, because of its prominent location. The 1887 station foreman's house (built in 1887, burned in 1972), was also prominently visible and shared some of its features, while other nearby stations, while also exhibiting Queen Anne features, were less ornate. The structure was converted to a gift shop by 1962. It presently serves as a visitor center and shop operated by the Appalachian Mountain Club. To its south stands the platform of the Conway Scenic Railroad.

== See also ==
- National Register of Historic Places listings in Coos County, New Hampshire

Preceding station	Maine Central Railroad	Following station
Bretton Woods toward St. Johnsbury	White Mountains Line	Bartlett toward Portland
