= John W. Weeks (New Hampshire politician) =

American politician (1781–1853)

Member of the U.S. House of Representatives from New Hampshire's at-large district
- In office March 4, 1829 – March 3, 1833
- Preceded by: Joseph Healy
- Succeeded by: Seat inactive

Personal details
- Born: John Wingate Weeks; March 31, 1781 Greenland, New Hampshire, U.S.
- Died: April 3, 1853 (aged 72) Lancaster, New Hampshire, U.S.
- Resting place: Old Cemetery
- Party: Jacksonian
- Relatives: John W. Weeks (great-nephew)
- Profession: Politician

John Wingate Weeks (March 31, 1781 – April 3, 1853) was a U.S. representative from New Hampshire, great uncle of John Wingate Weeks.

Born in Greenland, New Hampshire, Weeks attended the common schools and learned the carpenter's trade. During the War of 1812, he recruited a company for the Eleventh Regiment of United States Infantry and served as its captain. He was promoted to the rank of major. After the war, Weeks resided in Coos County, New Hampshire, where he held several local offices.

In 1820, together with a party that included Adrian N. Bracket, Philip Carrigain and Charles J. Stuart, Weeks enlisted Ethan Crawford as a guide in the White Mountains. The trip resulted in the party naming various peaks of the Presidential Range.

Weeks was elected as a Jacksonian to the Twenty-first and Twenty-second Congresses (March 4, 1829 – March 3, 1833). He died in Lancaster, New Hampshire, April 3, 1853, and was interred in the Old Cemetery.

U.S. House of Representatives
Preceded by Joseph Healy	Member of the U.S. House of Representatives from New Hampshire's at-large congressional district 1829-1833	Succeeded by Seat inactive
