= Willey House (New Hampshire) =

Site of a 1826 natural disaster

Coordinates: 44°10′56″N 71°23′58″W

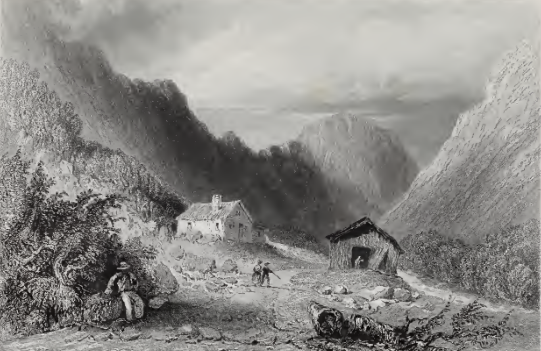
Drawing by W. H. Bartlett of the Willey House, Crawford Notch. Once the home of Ethan Crawford, it later became a tourist attraction following a storm in 1826 which resulted in the deaths of the Willey family and others.

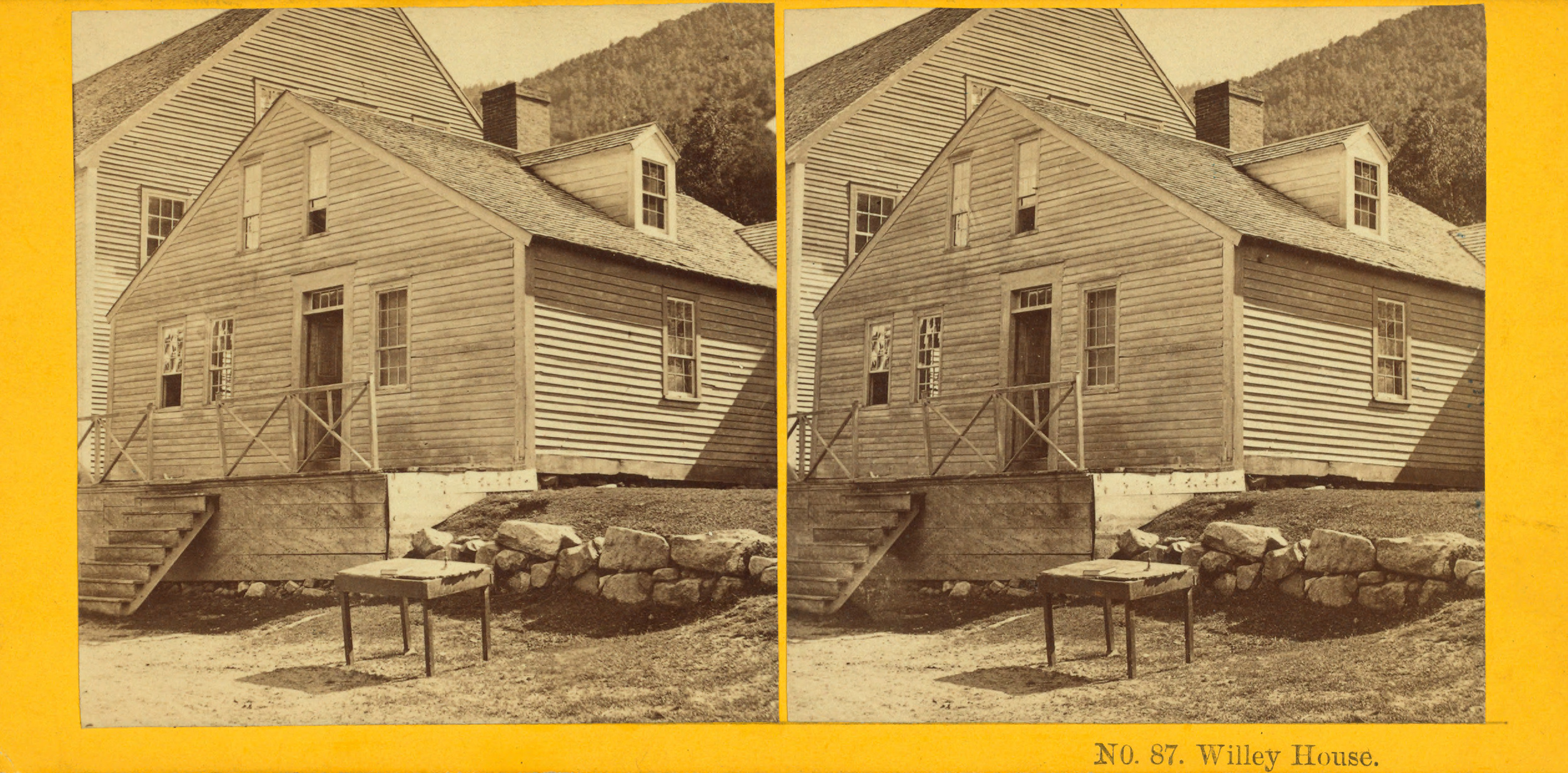
A stereoscopic slide of the Willey House by Kilburn Brothers, ca. 1872

The Willey House at Crawford Notch in the White Mountains of New Hampshire is associated principally with a tragedy of August 28, 1826, in which seven members of the Willey family and two other people died. Out of that event came a boost to the nascent tourism industry of the area.

== Background ==
The Willey House was originally known as Old Notch House and had been built in 1793. Ethan Crawford acquired it in 1823 for use as an inn to accommodate his growing business as a mountain guide, and in 1826 it was occupied by a family headed by Samuel J. Willey Jr.

== 1826 disaster ==
Northern New England experienced a drought in the summer of 1826, which ended with the arrival of a terrific storm on the evening of August 28. Flooding followed, with the valley at Crawford Notch being one place that suffered the consequences. All but two of the bridges on the turnpike that ran through the notch were destroyed, trees suffered a similar fate and the high sides of the valley were gouged by swollen streams and landslides. The Willey House was a scene of desolation due to the effects of an avalanche on a mountain behind it. The house, however, had survived in an island of calm because the surging debris split either side on a low ridge and then unified again beyond it.

Local residents, including Ethan Crawford and the Reverend Benjamin G. Willey, Samuel's brother, visited the house in the aftermath of the storm. It was empty, with signs that there may have been a rapid departure from it, such as unmade beds, clothes strewn around and ashes in the fireplace. There was an open Bible on the table. A search of the devastated area over the next few days revealed the bodies of the Willey parents, two of their daughters and two hired hands; the remains of the other three Willey children were never found. Some livestock had also been killed, including those in a now-destroyed stable.

There followed various theories as to what had happened, the most likely of which is that the occupants abandoned the property as the avalanche approached but in doing so, in darkness, they unwittingly put themselves in the path of it around the point where the flow reunited.

== Tourist attraction ==
News of the disaster spread, initially through many regional newspapers, and also through media such as Theodore Dwight's guidebook, The Northern Traveller. People began to visit the site, drawn to the scene of devastation, human tragedy and the miraculous survival of the structure itself. As well as boosting a nascent tourist industry in the area, in which the Crawford family had already been playing a significant part, it became a source of inspiration for artists and writers. The 4,000-foot (1,200 m) peak on the western wall of the notch became known as Mount Willey.

Dona Brown believes that the artist Thomas Cole and other visitors, such as Nathaniel Hawthorne, used the interest in the tragedy to draw interest to their work, deliberately painting and writing about an area that had suddenly gained national attention. Ethan Crawford, too, exploited it by, for example, ensuring that the Willey House was well signposted. The Crawfords had been directly affected by the storm, with Ethan's property suffering $1000 ($28,456 in 2025) of damage and his father's farm being wrecked almost beyond repair, but they were also affected in a positive manner with the subsequent influx of tourists. In 1828, Ethan began construction of a new inn, called the Notch House, at the northern end of the notch, appointing his brother Thomas to run it. The business opened in 1829 and attracted many notable people, including Ralph Waldo Emerson, Hawthorne, Henry David Thoreau and Daniel Webster.

Hawthorne was inspired by the Willey tragedy to write a short story titled "The Ambitious Guest" in 1835, while Cole noted in his diary that "The site of the Willey House, with its little patch of green in the gloomy desolation, very naturally recalled to mind the horrors of the night when the whole family perished beneath an avalanche of rocks and earth."

Horace Fabyan, who was a merchant and a speculator in the emerging tourism industry, took control of the Willey House in 1845 and converted it into a 50-bed hotel. Visitor interest in the effects of the disastrous storm waned over time, despite the efforts of people such as Benjamin Willey to maintain and profit by it by offering guided tours of the house for a fee. It had become old news and nature had taken its course to cover much of the scenic damage.

The site of the house and the landslide is now an interpretive center within Crawford Notch State Park.

== See also ==
- White Mountain art
