= Samuel Bemis =

American dentist and early photographer (1793–1881)

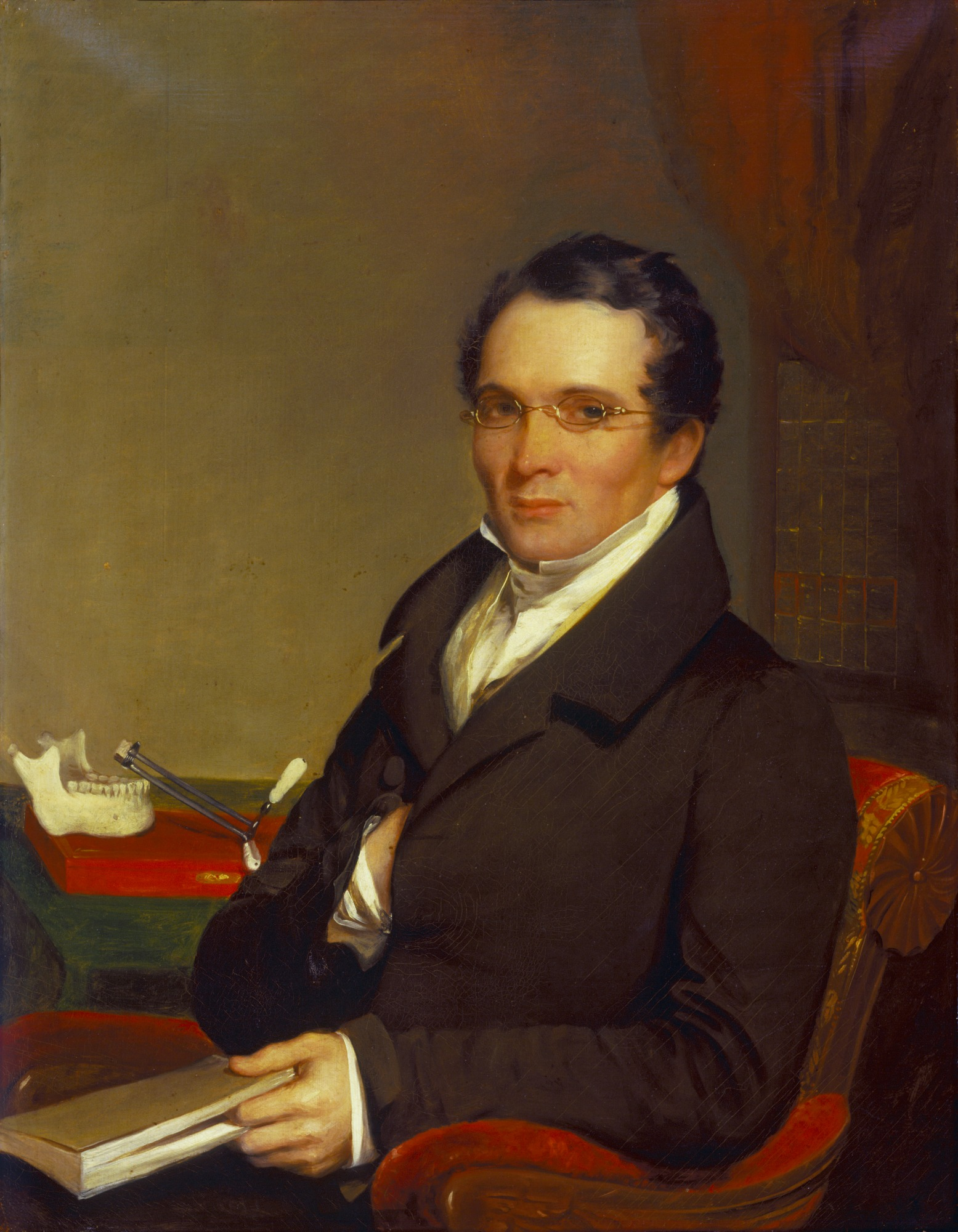
- portrait by Chester Harding
- Born: 1793
- Died: 1881
- Occupations: Photographer, dentist

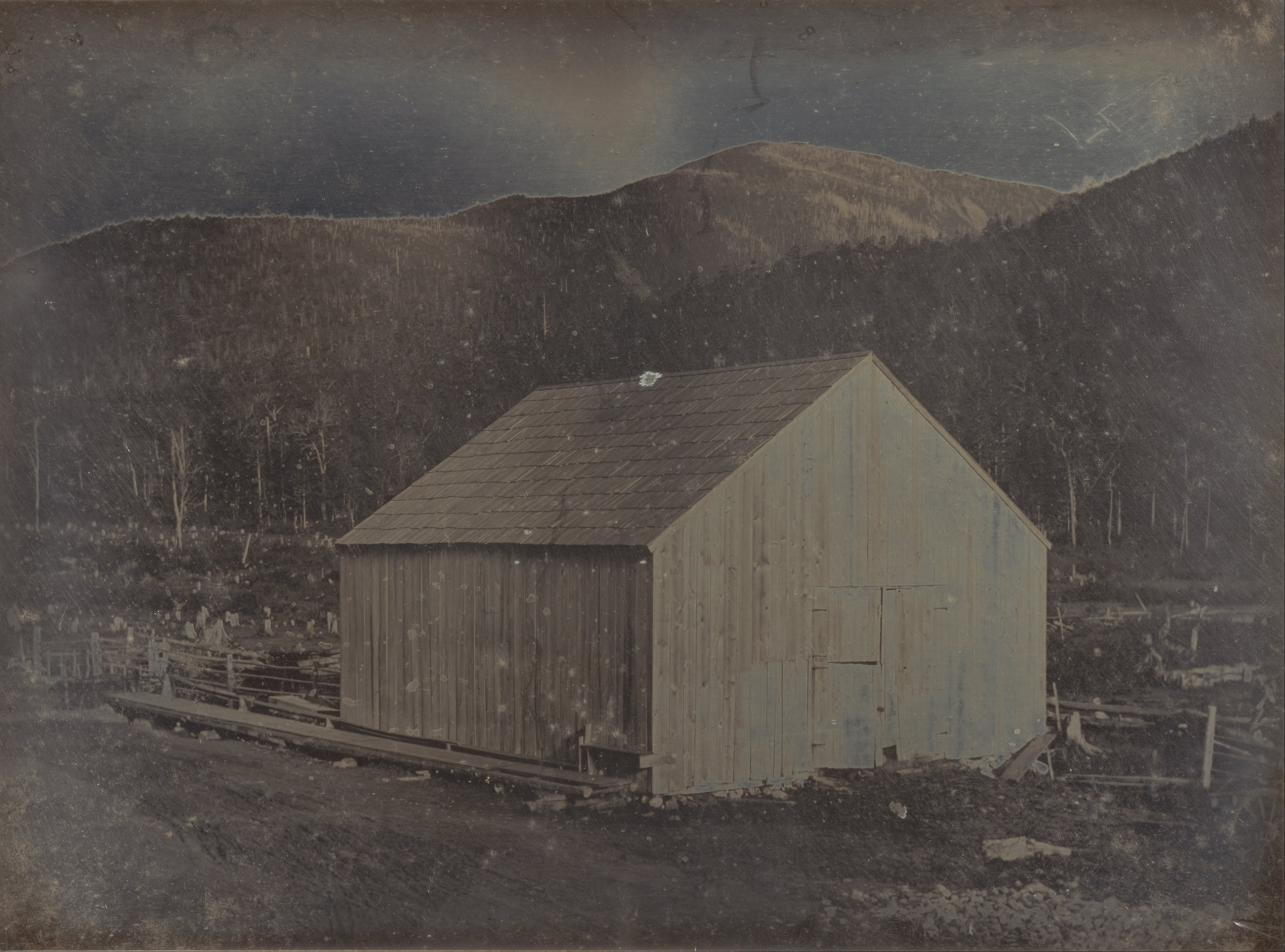
Daguerreotype by Bemis (about 1840)

Dr. Samuel A. Bemis (1793–1881) was one of the earliest photographers in the United States. A small number of his daguerreotypes have survived.

== Biography ==
Bemis was a Boston dentist when in April 1840 he acquired an early camera and became one of the first Americans to take a photograph. His extant daguerreotypes include views of Boston and of the White Mountains of New Hampshire. These images are the earliest known American photographs of natural landscapes.

Bemis's interest in photography began in March 1840 when he attended a series of lectures and demonstration of the daguerreotype process given by François Fauvel-Gouraud, a pupil of Louis-Jacques Mandé Daguerre and an agent for Alphonse Giroux & Cie., sole manufacturers of equipment endorsed by Daguerre. (Daguerre had announced his process in early 1839. Gouraud arrived in New York City on November 23, 1839, there exhibited daguerreotypes in December, and in January lectured in Philadelphia. By March he was lecturing in Boston with Edward Everett Hale among his other students; from there he travelled on to Providence, Rhode Island, and by 1842 was listed as a daguerrean in Buffalo, New York.)

Bemis bought his daguerreotype camera from Gouraud for $51, along with twelve daguerreotype plates (16.5 x 21.6 cm) at $2 each. His total investment was $76 ($2,451 in 2025 dollars), a considerable sum. (This is believed to be the first camera sold commercially in the United States.) Four days later, on April 19, 1840, Bemis made his first daguerreotype. His early pictures were taken in Boston. When summer came, he photographed in the White Mountains around Crawford Notch, where he had recently relocated. Bemis was not a masterful technician; his remaining images show inadequate processing of the daguerreotype plates. Bemis actively daguerreotyped until October, 1843, and evidently took up other hobbies. His camera apparatus is on display at the George Eastman House along with the original bill of sale and some of his images.

In New Hampshire, Bemis bought land from innkeeper Abel Crawford, who had pioneered tourism in the White Mountains. This property included most of today's Crawford Notch. Spurned in romance shortly after his move, Bemis built a granite mansion and became an eccentric recluse. At one time called "the Lord of the Valley", Bemis named a lake, mountain, brook, ridge, and other spots in the White Mountains for himself. In an obituary published in 1881, he was described as "not as odd as might be expected, yet sufficiently so to distinguish him from the ordinary run of men." His house, now known as the Notchland Inn, currently operates as a bed-and-breakfast establishment. Bemis is buried beside the house.

== Collections of his images ==
- George Eastman House (19 plates and his two cameras)
- Getty Museum (4 plates)

== Manuscripts ==
- The Bemis papers were recently donated to the Conway Public Library, Conway, NH by Ed Butler and Les Schoof, owners of the Notchland Inn. Read the press release announcing the donation.
