= Crawford Notch State Park =

State park in New Hampshire

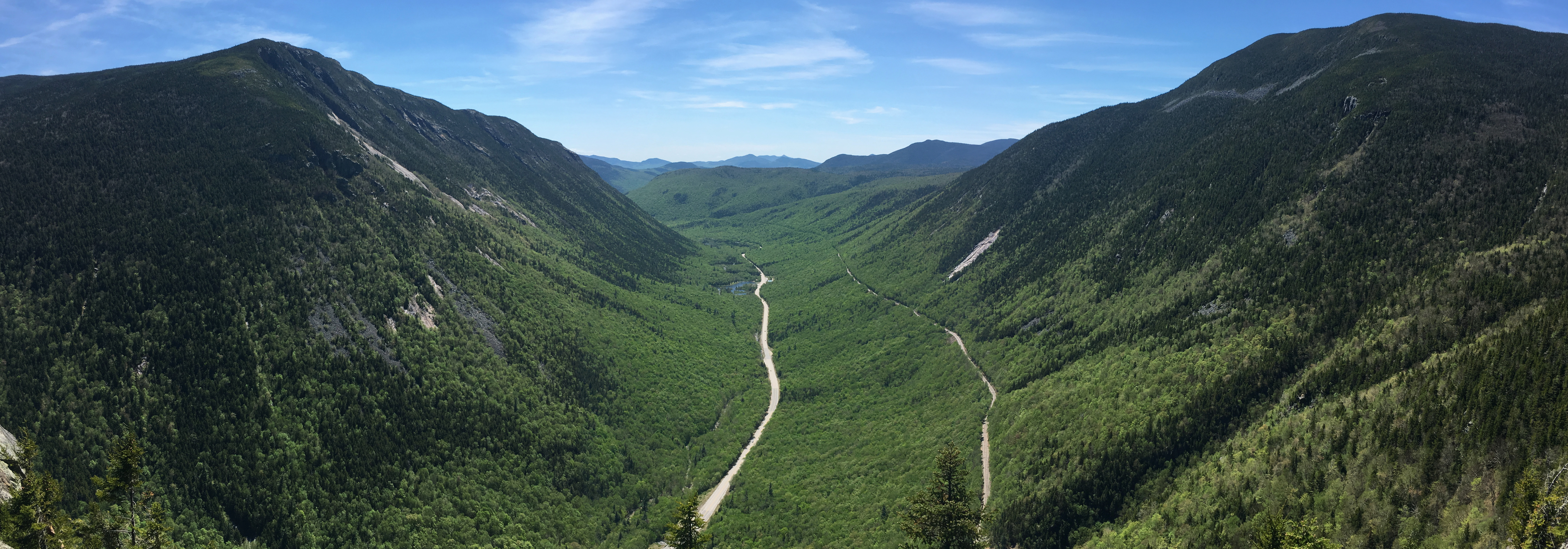
- View from the top of Mount Willard Trail

- Location within New Hampshire
- Interactive map of Crawford Notch State Park
- Location: Harts Location, New Hampshire, United States
- Coordinates: 44°10′41″N 71°24′00″W
- Area: 5,775 acres (2,337 ha)
- Elevation: 1,532 feet (467 m)
- Established: 1913
- Administrator: New Hampshire Division of Parks and Recreation
- Website: Official website
- New Hampshire State Parks

Crawford Notch State Park is located on U.S. Highway 302, in northern New Hampshire, between Bretton Woods and Bartlett. The 5,775-acre (2,337 ha) park occupies the center of Crawford Notch, a major pass through the White Mountains.

The park includes the Willey House historical site and the Dry River Campground with 36 sites. Hiking trails in the park lead to popular destinations such as Ripley Falls and Arethusa Falls.

== Gallery ==
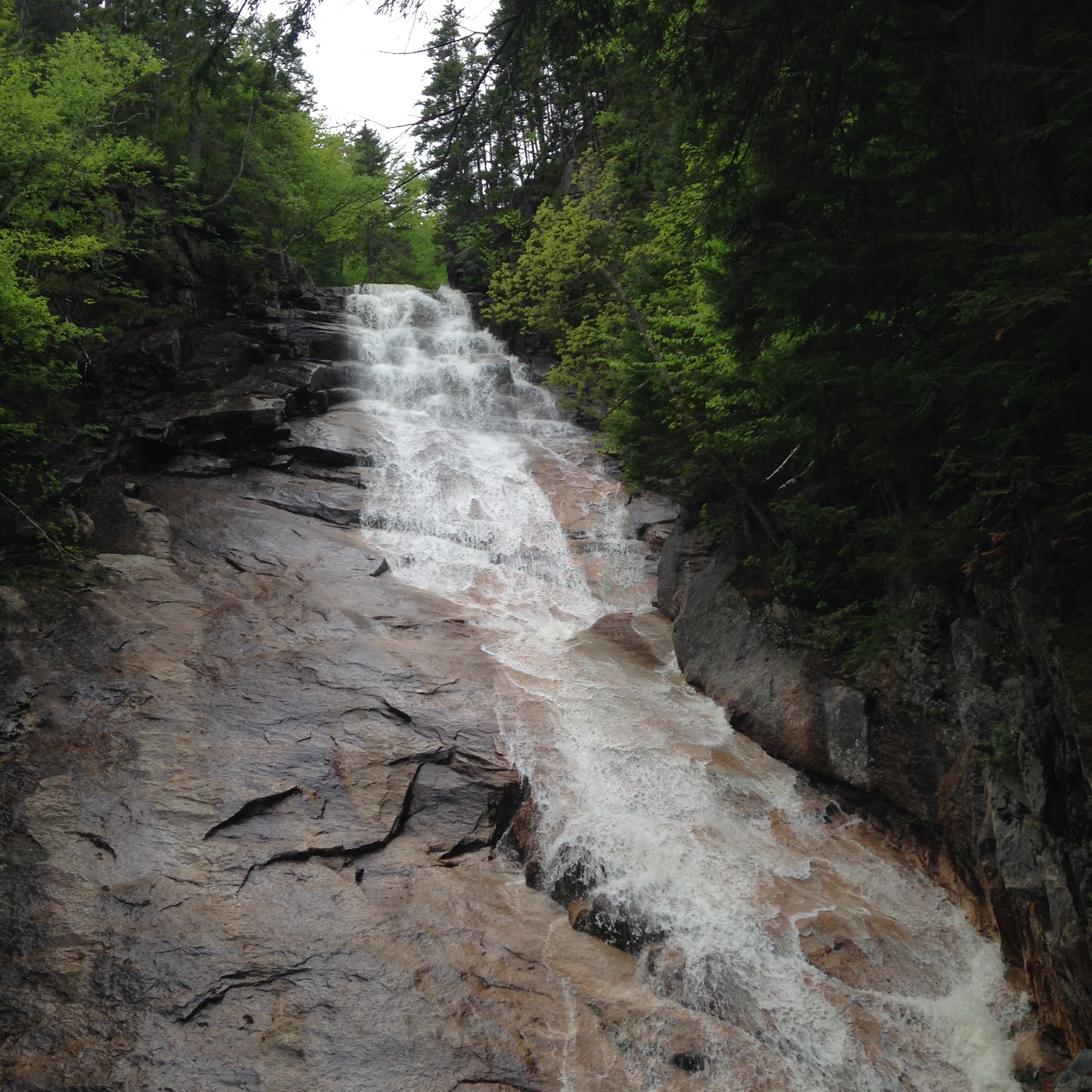
Ripley Falls

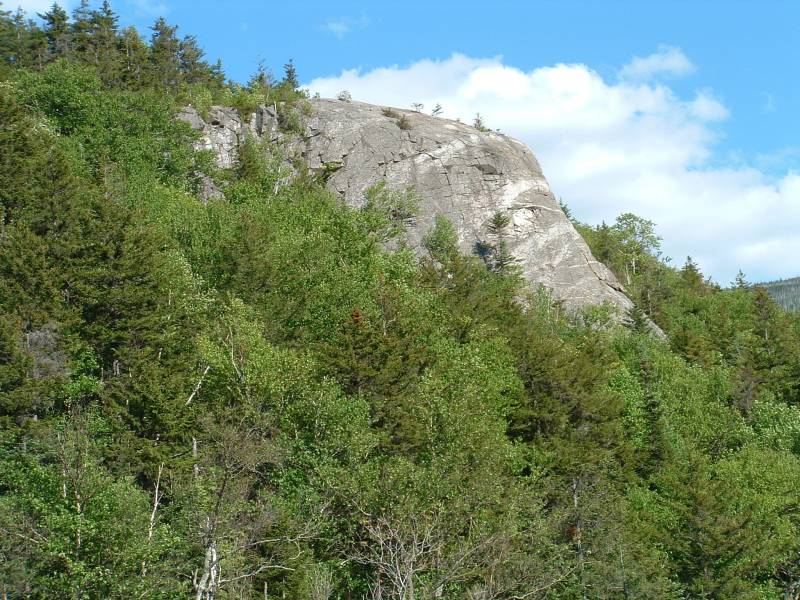
Elephant Head

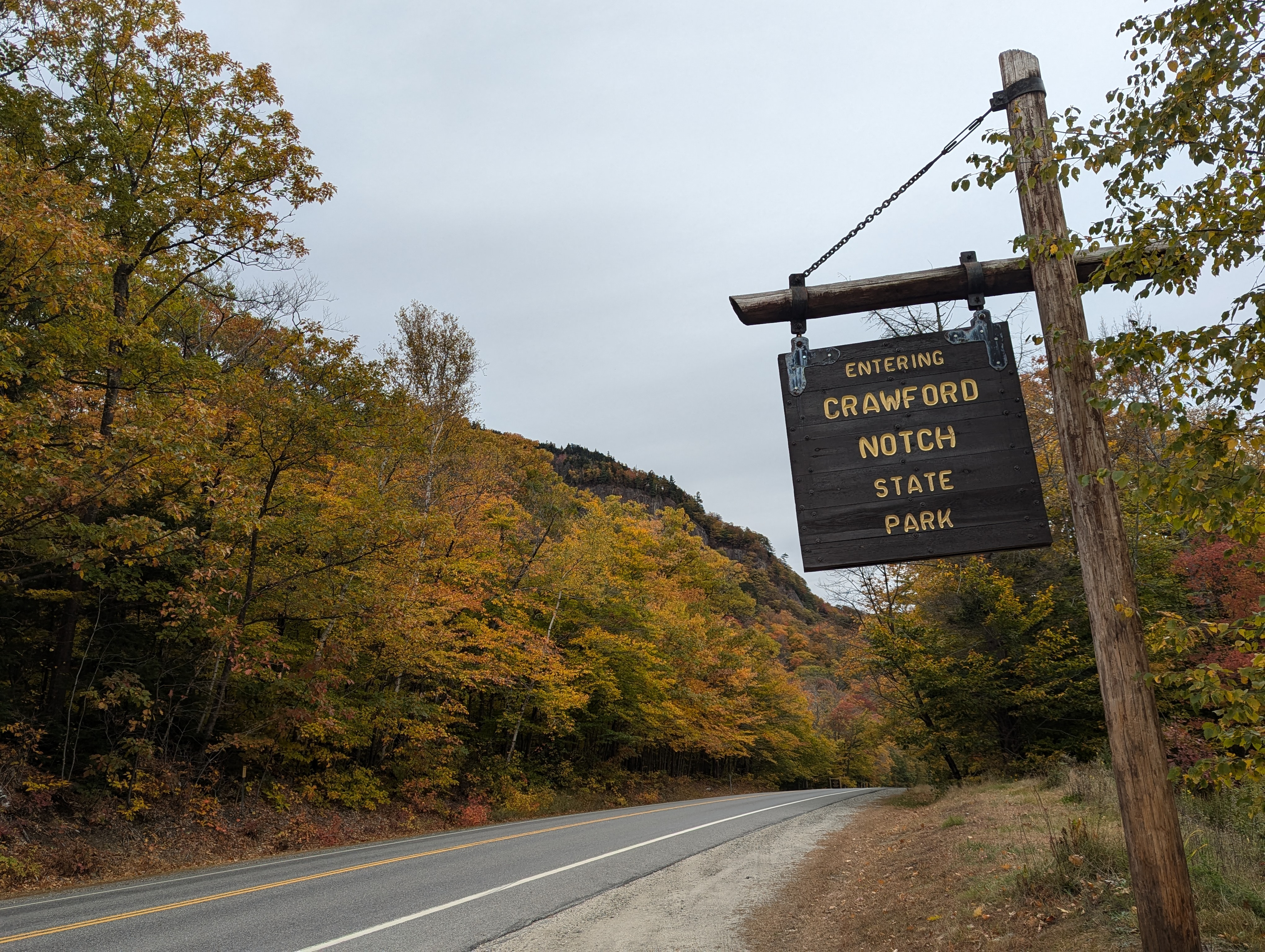
Entrance sign
