= Hart's Location, New Hampshire =

- Town
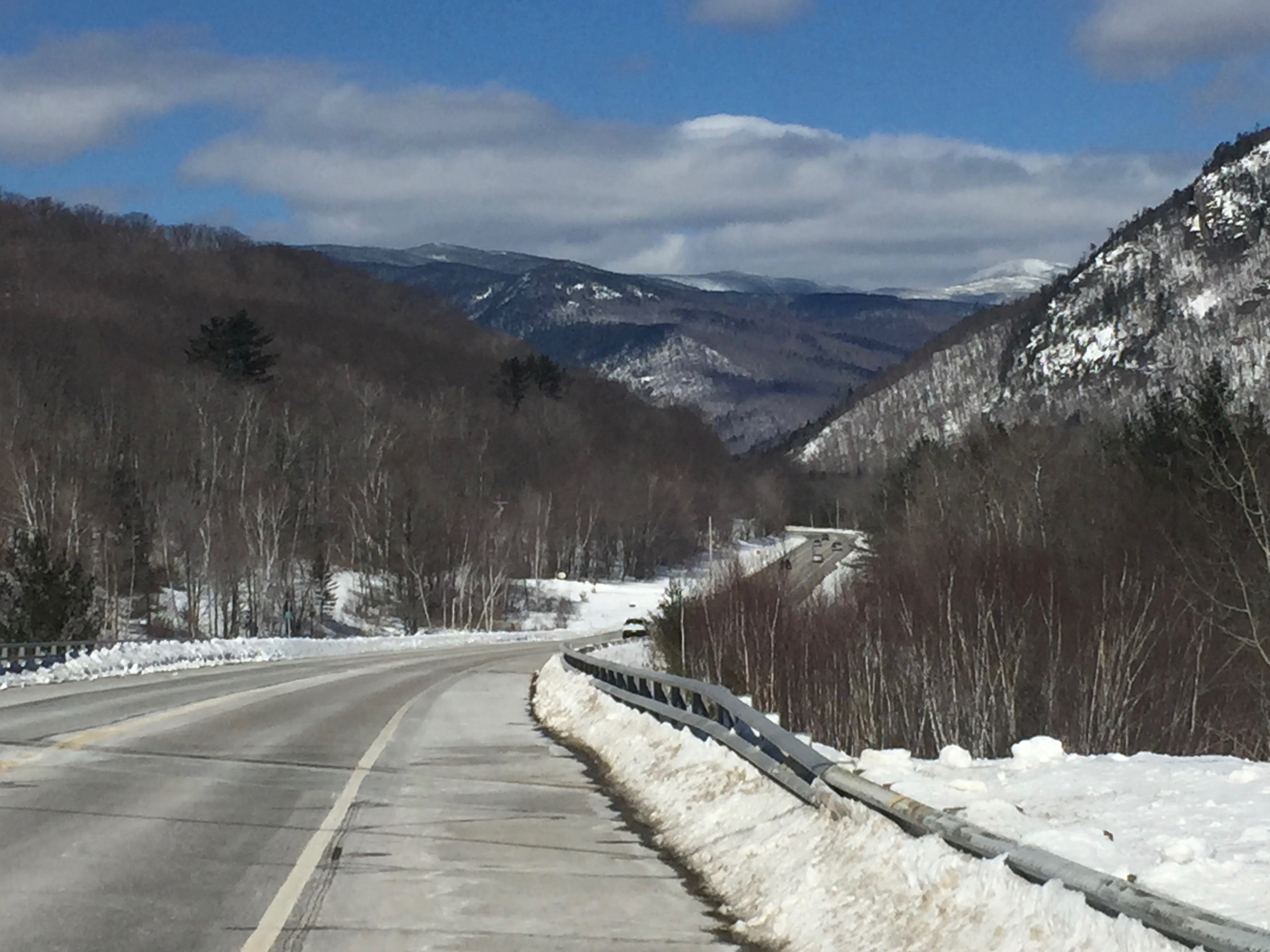
- Looking north along U.S. Route 302 in Hart's Location

- Location in Carroll County, New Hampshire
- Coordinates: 44°08′11″N 71°22′21″W
- Country: United States
- State: New Hampshire
- County: Carroll
- Incorporated: 1795

Area
  - Total: 18.78 sq mi (48.65 km^{2})
  - Land: 18.68 sq mi (48.38 km^{2})
  - Water: 0.10 sq mi (0.27 km^{2}) 0.56%
- Elevation: 1,893 ft (577 m)

Population (2020)
  - Total: 68
  - Density: 3.6/sq mi (1.4/km^{2})
- Time zone: UTC−5 (Eastern)
  - Summer (DST): UTC−4 (Eastern)
- ZIP Code: 03812
- Area code: 603
- FIPS code: 33-34500
- GNIS feature ID: 872015
- Website: www.hartslocation.com

Hart's Location is a town in Carroll County, New Hampshire, United States. Since 1948, the town has frequently been one of the first places to declare its results for the New Hampshire presidential primary and U.S. presidential elections.

The population was 68 at the 2020 census, and was also around 68 in 2025. It was incorporated in 1795. Hart's Location maintains a board of selectmen, but is otherwise dependent on the town of Bartlett and Carroll County for services. Home to Crawford Notch State Park, the town is crossed by the Appalachian Trail.

== History ==
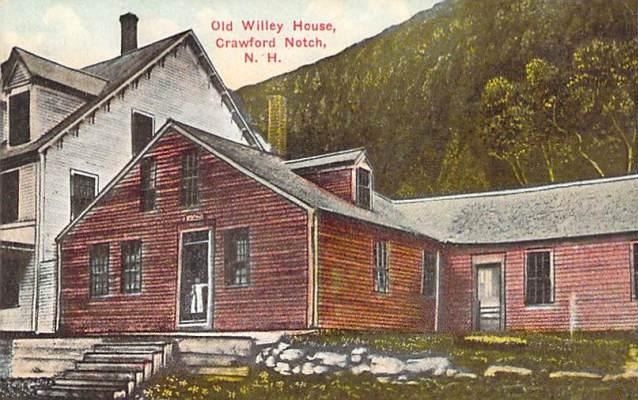
Old Willey House (1793–1898)

Hart's Location was named after Colonel John Hart of Portsmouth, New Hampshire. In 1772, the land was granted to Thomas Chadbourne, also of Portsmouth. Native Americans used a trail up the Saco River valley through Crawford Notch, and during the French and Indian Wars, many English captives were taken to Canada that way. Despite this, the pass through the White Mountains was otherwise unknown until 1771, when Timothy Nash discovered it hunting moose, and told Governor John Wentworth.

The obscure Indian trail transformed into the Coös Road, on which was built a small public house in 1793. It was abandoned, but in 1825 Samuel Willey Jr. occupied it with his wife, five children, and two hired hands. During a violent storm on August 28, 1826, they all died in a landslide known as Willey's Slide. They fled their home and took refuge in a shelter, but it was destroyed while the house remained unscathed.

A rock outcrop uphill divided the slide, which flowed around the home and reunited below it. The door was found gaping, with a Bible open on the table. Their tragedy inspired the short story "The Ambitious Guest" (1835) by Nathaniel Hawthorne, and Mount Willey was named in their memory. The house became part of a larger inn, then burned in 1898. Today, the location is a state historic site.

In 1875, the Portland and Ogdensburg Railroad completed its line up through Crawford Notch. Passengers thrilled to traverse the Frankenstein Trestle, 520 feet (158 m) long and 85 feet (26 m) above the ravine floor, and then the Willey Brook Bridge, 400 feet (122 m) long and 94 feet (29 m) high. Later part of the Mountain Division of the Maine Central Railroad, the route is still traveled by the Conway Scenic Railroad.

== Geography ==
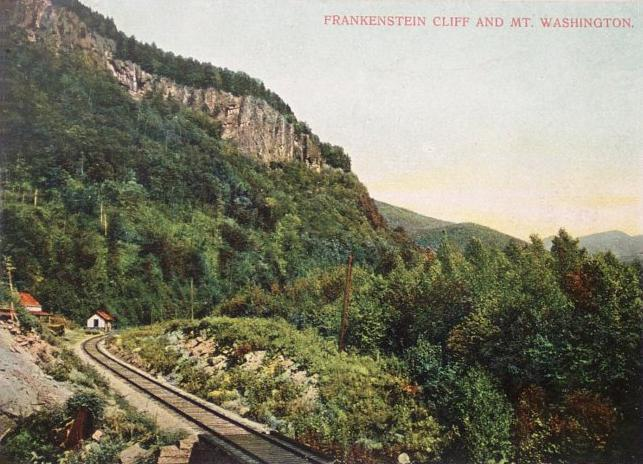
Frankenstein Cliff c. 1905

According to the United States Census Bureau, the town has a total area of 18.8 square miles (48.6 km^{2}), of which 18.7 square miles (48.4 km^{2}) are land and 0.1 square miles (0.3 km^{2}), or 0.56%, are water.

The shape of Hart's Location is unusual: about 11 miles (18 km) long and 1.5 miles (2.4 km) wide, with crooked boundaries that echo the confines of Crawford Notch, threaded by the upper Saco River and U.S. Route 302 near the centerline of the town, and pinched from both sides between steep mountains and in some areas sheer cliffs above. This anomaly is heightened on maps that show county lines: Coos County lies immediately to the east and Grafton County to the west, but Hart's Location is part of Carroll County, though barely connected to it.

The highest point in Hart's Location is 3,900 feet (1,200 m) above sea level along the town's western boundary, beneath the summit of 4,285-foot (1,306 m) Mount Willey. Arethusa Falls, New Hampshire's highest waterfall, located in the neighboring township of Livermore, is a popular hiking destination with access from U.S. Route 302 in Hart's Location. The town lies fully within the Saco River watershed.

== Demographics ==
Historical population
Census	Pop.	Note	%±
1870	26		—
1880	70		169.2%
1890	187		167.1%
1900	38		−79.7%
1910	85		123.7%
1920	35		−58.8%
1930	29		−17.1%
1940	17		−41.4%
1950	11		−35.3%
1960	7		−36.4%
1970	7		0.0%
1980	27		285.7%
1990	36		33.3%
2000	37		2.8%
2010	41		10.8%
2020	68		65.9%
2024 (est.)	64		−5.9%
U.S. Decennial Census

In the 2000 census, there were 37 people, 15 households, and 10 families living there. The population density was 2.0 inhabitants per square mile (0.77/km^{2}). There were 50 housing units at an average density of 2.7 per square mile (1.0/km^{2}). The racial makeup of the location was 97.30% (36 people) White, with 2.70% (one person) citing themselves as from two or more races.

There were 15 households, out of which 33.3% had children under the age of 18 living with them, 66.7% were married couples living together, and 33.3% were non-families. 26.7% of all households were made up of individuals, and 6.7% had someone living alone who was 65 years of age or older. The average household size was 2.47 and the average family size was 3.10.

24.3% of residents were under the age of 18, 5.4% were from 18 to 24, 35.1% were from 25 to 44, 8.1% were from 45 to 64, and 27.0% were 65 years of age or older. The median age was 39 years. For every 100 females, there were 94.7 males. For every 100 females age 18 and over, there were 100.0 males.

The median household income was $41,250, and the median income for a family was $70,833. Males had a median income of $26,250 versus $28,750 for females. The per capita income for the town was $19,609. None of the population and none of the families were below the poverty line.

== Politics ==
=== Federal elections ===
New Hampshire law allows towns with fewer than 100 residents to open the polls at midnight and close them as soon as all registered voters have cast their ballots. Hart's Location is one of the New Hampshire communities where the first votes are cast in the Democratic and Republican New Hampshire primaries, the first presidential primaries in the United States during each presidential election year. The tradition of first-in-the-nation voting in Hart's Location dates back to 1948 when residents initially voted at 7 AM. In 1952, the town shifted to midnight to facilitate greater access to the polls for railroad workers.

In 1964, Hart's Location discontinued the practice of midnight voting. In 1996 the tradition was revived, thanks to new owners of a local inn who aimed to garner more media attention for the small town. In 2024, it was announced that the town would once again abandon the practice. Local officials cited reasons such as the increasing length of ballots, the time required for vote tallying, and new stringent voting requirements that complicate the process.

==== Election results ====
Boldfaced names indicate the ultimate nationwide winner of each contest:

===== 1996 =====
Dem. primary: (12 votes)	Rep. primary: (19 votes)	General election: (31 votes)
**Bill Clinton** – 12	Lamar Alexander – 8	Bob Dole – 13
	**Bob Dole** – 3	**Bill Clinton** – 12
	Pat Buchanan – 3	Ross Perot – 4
	Steve Forbes – 3	Harry Browne – 2
	Phil Gramm – 1	
	Colin Powell – 1, write-in	

===== 2000 =====
Dem primary: (12 votes)	Rep primary: (14 votes)	General election: (30 votes)
Bill Bradley – 9	John McCain – 9	**George W. Bush** – 17
**Al Gore** – 3	**George W. Bush** – 5	Al Gore – 13

===== 2004 =====
Dem. primary: (16 votes)	Rep. primary: (13 votes)	General election: (31 votes)
Wesley Clark – 6	**George W. Bush** – 13	**George W. Bush** – 16
**John Kerry** – 5		John Kerry – 14
Howard Dean – 3		Ralph Nader – 1
John Edwards – 2		

===== 2008 =====
Dem. primary: (13 votes)	Rep. primary: (16 votes)	General election: (29 votes)
**Barack Obama** – 9	**John McCain** – 6	**Barack Obama** – 17
Hillary Clinton – 3	Mike Huckabee – 5	John McCain – 10
John Edwards – 1	Ron Paul – 4	Ron Paul – 2, write-in
	Mitt Romney – 1	

===== 2012 =====
Dem. primary:	Rep. primary: (13 votes)	General election: (33 votes)
**Barack Obama** – 10	**Mitt Romney** – 5	**Barack Obama** – 23
	Ron Paul – 4	Mitt Romney – 9
	Jon Huntsman – 2	Gary Johnson – 1
	Newt Gingrich – 1	
	Rick Perry – 1	

===== 2016 =====
Dem. primary: (21 votes)	Rep. primary: (14 votes)	General election: (37 votes)
Bernie Sanders – 12	John Kasich – 5	Hillary Clinton – 17
**Hillary Clinton** – 7	**Donald Trump** – 4	**Donald Trump** – 14
Mark Stewart Greenstein – 2	Chris Christie – 2	Gary Johnson – 3
	Jeb Bush – 1	Bernie Sanders – 2
	Ben Carson – 1	John Kasich/Sanders (write-in) – 1
	Marco Rubio – 1	

===== 2020 =====
Dem. primary: (18 votes)	Rep. primary: (20 votes)	General election: (43 votes)
Amy Klobuchar – 6	**Donald Trump** – 15	**Joe Biden** – 23
Elizabeth Warren – 4	Bill Weld – 4	Donald Trump – 20
Andrew Yang – 3	Mary Maxwell – 1	
Bernie Sanders – 2		
**Joe Biden** – 1		
Tulsi Gabbard – 1		
Tom Steyer – 1		

== In popular culture ==
The community's voting tradition received a nod in the 2002 third-season episode of US television program The West Wing, in an episode entitled "Hartsfield's Landing", named after a town modeled on either Hart's Location, or its companion, Dixville Notch.

== See also ==
- White Mountain art
- Dixville Notch, New Hampshire
- New Hampshire Historical Marker No. 186: Sawyer's Rock
- New Hampshire Historical Marker No. 213: Frankenstein Trestle
