= Crawford Notch =

Major pass through White Mountains in New Hampshire, US

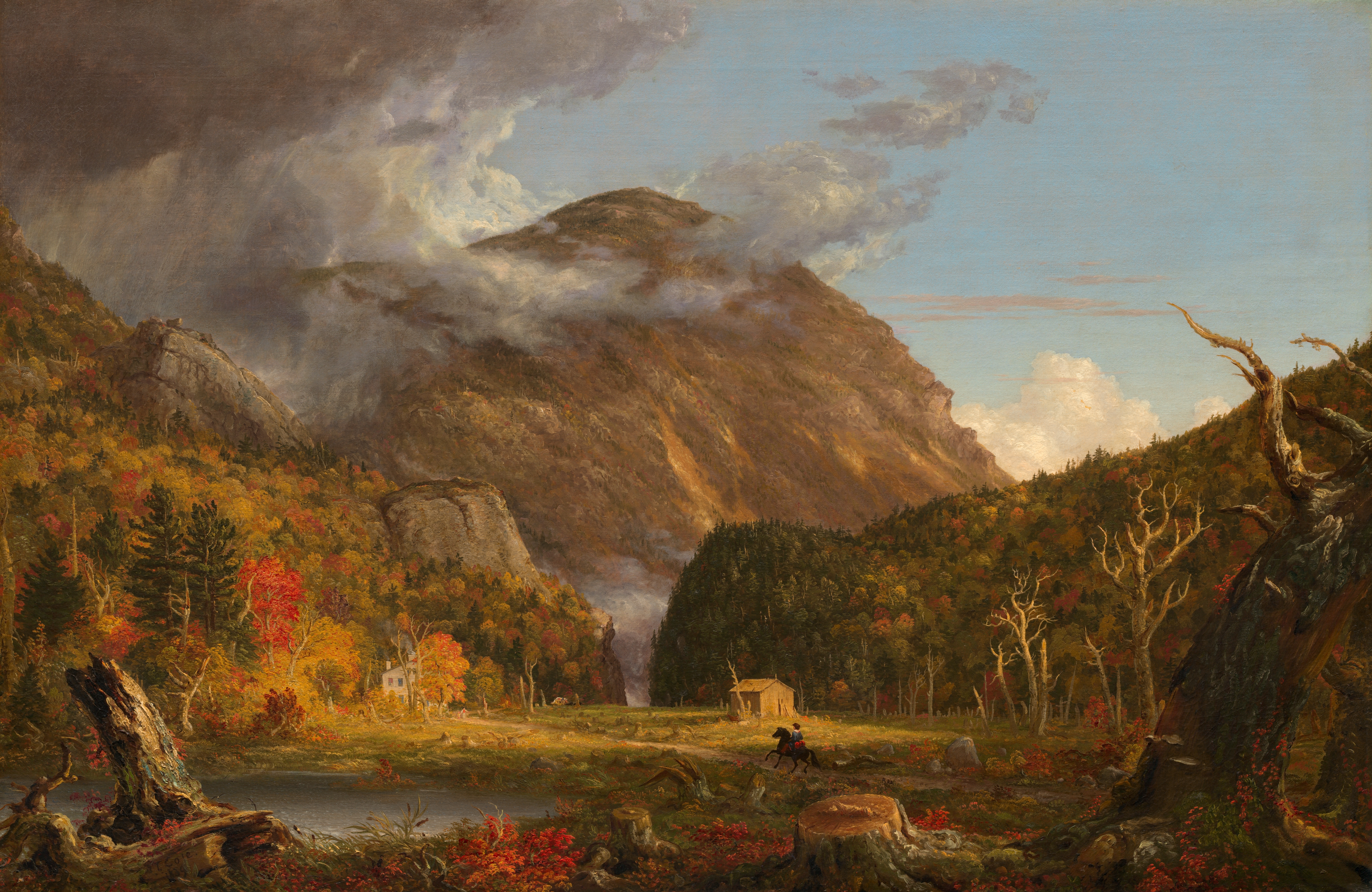
- The Notch of the White Mountains (1839), by Thomas Cole (1801–1848), looking south past Saco Lake
- Interactive map of Crawford Notch
- Elevation: 1,900 ft (580 m)
- Traversed by: U.S. Route 302

Location
- Location: Carroll / Coos counties, New Hampshire, U.S.
- Range: White Mountains
- Coordinates: 44°13′7″N 71°24′42″W
- Topo map: USGS Crawford Notch, Stairs Mountain, Bartlett

Crawford Notch is a major pass through the White Mountains of New Hampshire, located in Hart's Location. Roughly half of that town is contained in Crawford Notch State Park. The high point of the notch, at approximately 1,900 feet (580 m) above sea level, is at the southern end of the town of Carroll, near the Crawford Depot train station and Saco Lake, the source of the Saco River, which flows southward through the steep-sided notch. North of the high point of the notch, Crawford Brook flows more gently northwest to the Ammonoosuc River, a tributary of the Connecticut River.

The notch is traversed by U.S. Route 302, which closely follows the Saco River southeast to North Conway and less closely follows the Ammonoosuc River northwest to Littleton.

== History ==
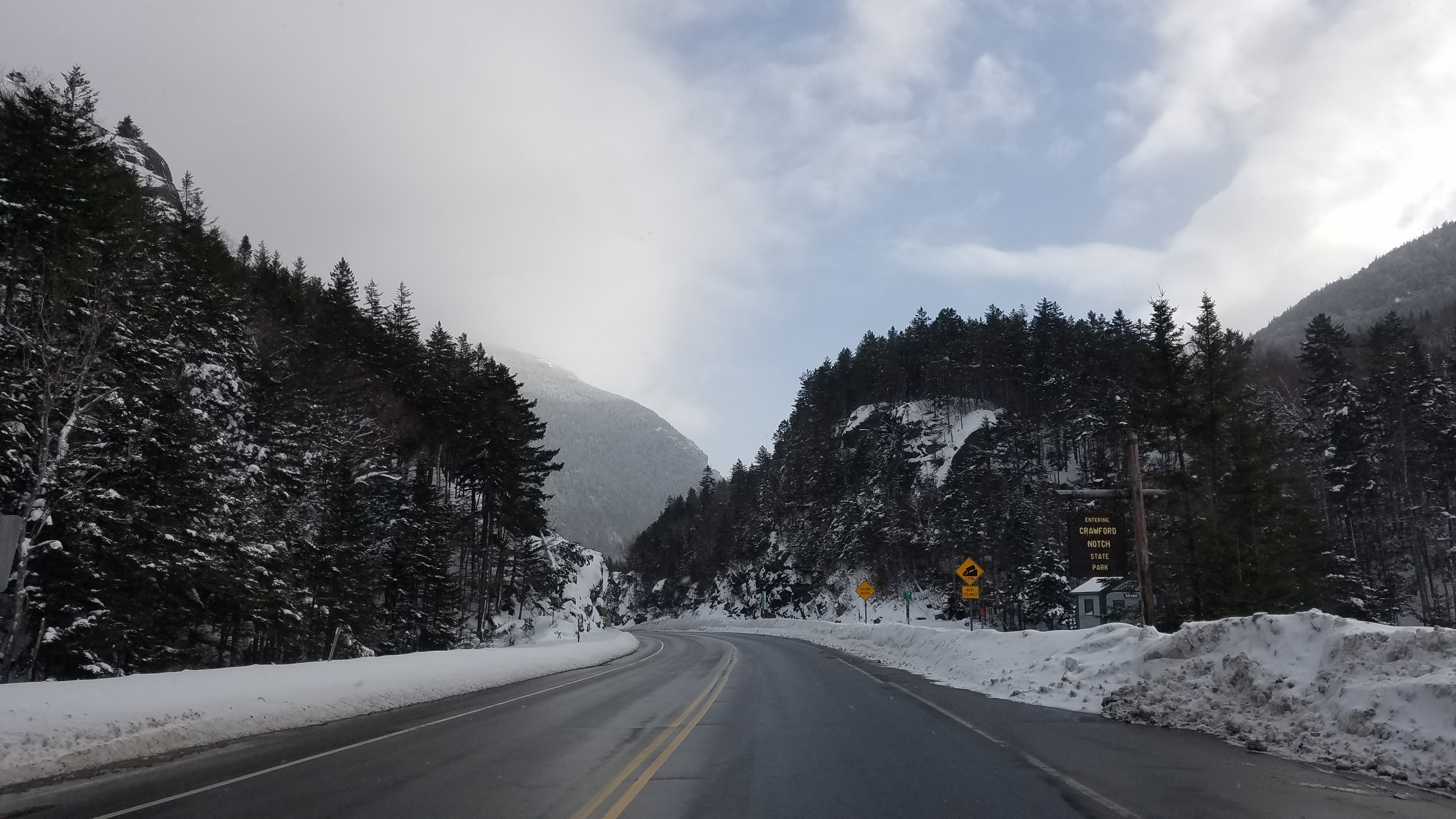
The summit of Crawford Notch in January

Originally called White Mountain Notch, it became known to European settlers when found by Timothy Nash in 1771. The 1772 boundaries of Hart's Grant reflected its shape. It was named for the Crawford family, who were trail-builders and hostelers there in the 19th century. The Tenth New Hampshire Turnpike from Portsmouth was extended through the notch to Lancaster in 1803. The turnpike and later Portland and Ogdensburg Railroad through Crawford Notch opened a new route through the White Mountains for settlers of the area to the northwest to reach Conway on the way to the trading ports on the coast.

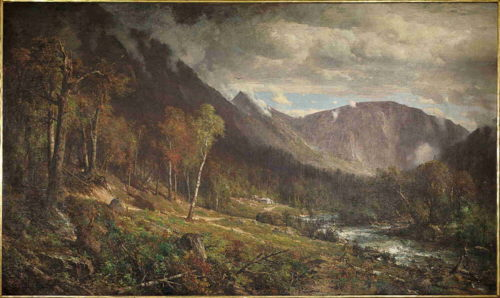
Crawford Notch (1867), by Thomas Hill (1829–1908), looking north, collection of the New Hampshire Historical Society

A well-documented historic event within the notch was a rockslide that killed the entire Samuel Willey family in August 1826. The family fled their home during the storm to a prepared shelter but were buried by the slide and died in a mass of stone and rubble. Their home was untouched. Mount Willey, on the west side of the notch, is named in their memory. The event in part inspired a short story by Nathaniel Hawthorne titled "The Ambitious Guest". Further down the notch, Nancy Brook and Mount Nancy are named for an earlier tragedy.

In the Carroll portion of the notch, the Appalachian Mountain Club has built and operates the Highland Center Lodge and Conference Center (on the site of the Crawford House Hotel, a 19th-century grand hotel that burned in 1972), and has renovated the Queen Anne style Victorian-era Crawford Notch Maine Central train depot as a bookstore. The depot remains a stop on the scenic "Notch Train" of the Conway Scenic Railroad, operated seasonally from North Conway.

== Points of interest ==
- Grave of Samuel Bemis, first photographer of the American landscape
- Mount Willard, open summit near center of notch with views of the notch's structure

== See also ==
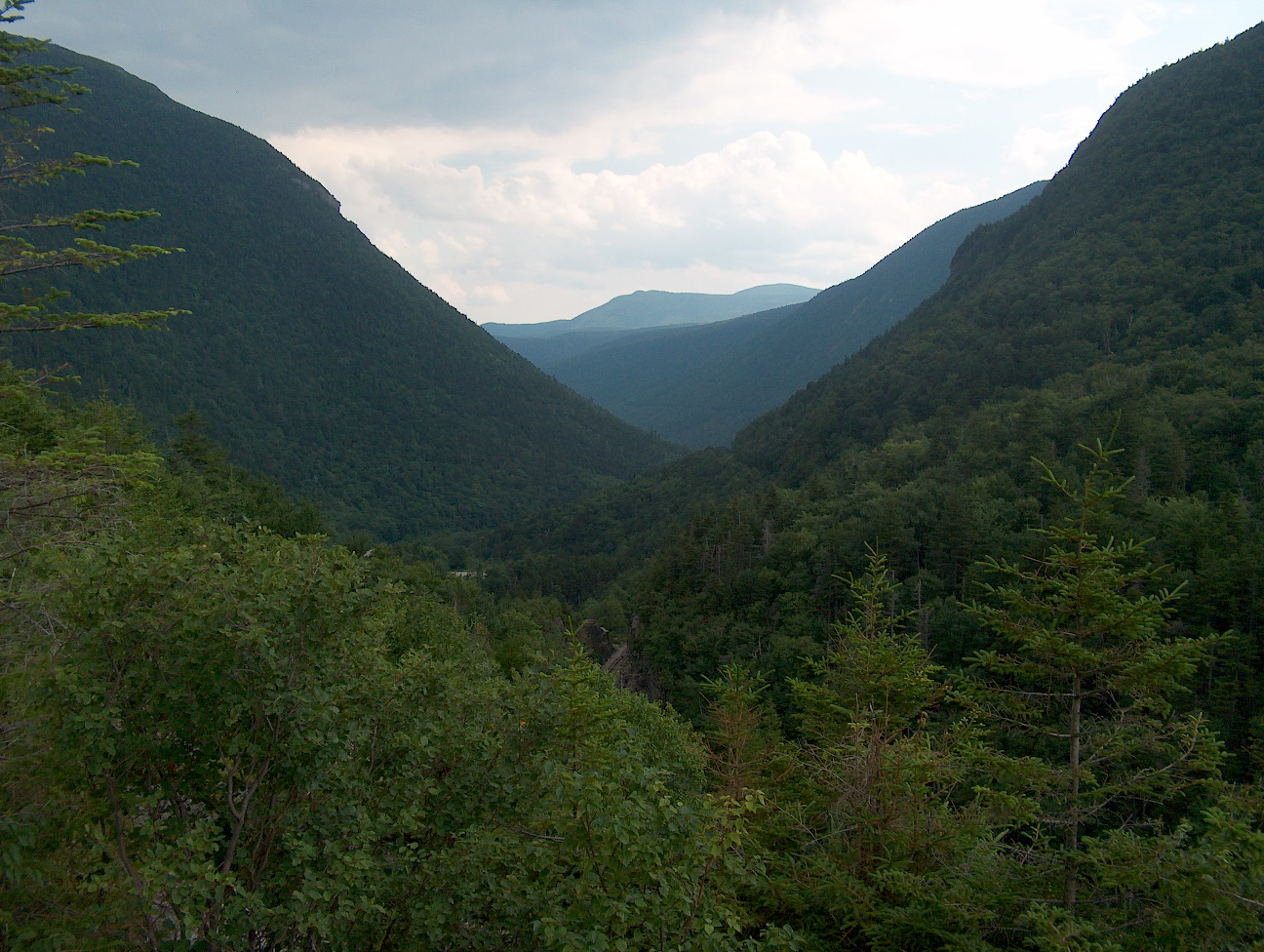
Present-day Crawford Notch, looking south from Elephant Head rock (visible to left of notch in Thomas Cole painting)

- List of mountain passes in New Hampshire
- Nash & Sawyer Location, New Hampshire
- New Hampshire Historical Marker No. 30: The Crawford Family
- List of New Hampshire state parks
