= Appalachian Trail by state =

2200-mile hiking trail in the eastern US

The Appalachian National Scenic Trail spans 14 U.S. states over its roughly 2,200 miles (3,500 km): Georgia, North Carolina, Tennessee, Virginia, West Virginia, Maryland, Pennsylvania, New Jersey, New York, Connecticut, Massachusetts, Vermont, New Hampshire, and Maine. The southern end is at Springer Mountain, Georgia, and it follows the ridgeline of the Appalachian Mountains, crossing many of its highest peaks and running almost continuously through wilderness before reaching the northern end at Mount Katahdin, Maine.

The trail is currently protected along more than 99 percent of its course by federal or state land ownership or right-of-way. Annually, more than 4,000 volunteers contribute over 175,000 hours to maintain the trail, an effort coordinated largely by the Appalachian Trail Conservancy (ATC), assisted by some thirty trail clubs and multiple partnerships.

== Georgia ==
Counties crossed: Fannin County → Union County → Lumpkin County → White County → Towns County → Habersham County → Rabun County

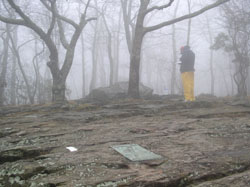
A hiker signs the register at the southern terminus of the AT on Springer Mountain

Georgia has 76.4 miles (123.0 km) of the trail, including the southern terminus at Springer Mountain (elevation 3,780 ft or 1,150 m). An 8.8-mile (14.2 km) approach trail (not part of the AT) begins at the Amicalola Falls State Park visitor center. At 4,458 feet (1,359 m), Blood Mountain is the highest point on the trail in Georgia. The AT and approach trail are managed and maintained by the Georgia Appalachian Trail Club.

- See: Georgia Peaks on the Appalachian Trail

== North Carolina ==
Counties crossed: Clay County → Macon County → Swain County → Graham County → Swain County → (The following counties are traversed along the Tennessee border) Haywood County → Madison County → Yancey County → Mitchell County → Avery County

North Carolina has 95.5 miles (153.7 km) of the trail, not including more than 200 miles (320 km) along the Tennessee border. Altitude ranges from 1,725 to 5,498 feet (526 to 1,676 m).

The trail crosses Bly Gap one-tenth of a mile north of the Georgia state line. The trail further north includes peaks such as Standing Indian Mountain, Mount Albert, and Wayah Bald, followed by a Nantahala Gorge crossing by Wesser Falls and at Nantahala Outdoor Center.

At the section's north end, is the Fontana Dam Shelter, affectionately known as the Fontana Hilton, known for its view of fjordlike Fontana Lake, comparatively spacious accommodations, water spigots, flush toilets, nearby free hot showers, and a three dollar shuttle into Fontana Dam, North Carolina.

== Tennessee ==
Counties crossed: Blount County → Sevier County → Cocke County → Greene County → Unicoi County → Carter County (where it leaves the North Carolina border) → Johnson County → Sullivan County

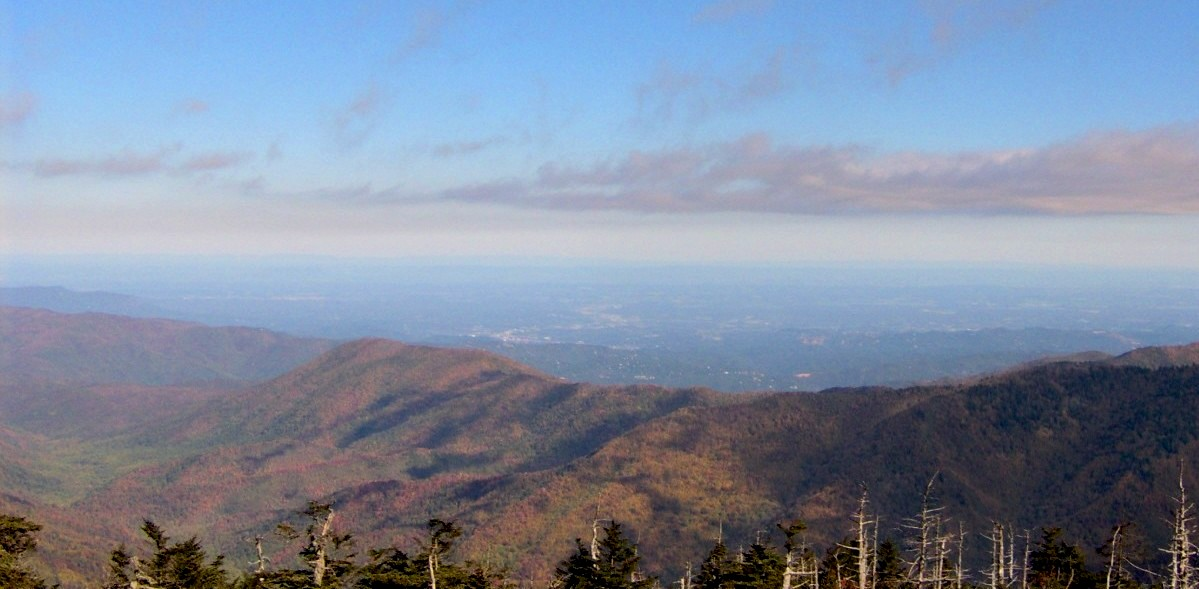
A view north from the summit of Kuwohi, formerly known as Clingmans Dome

Tennessee has 287.9 miles (463.3 km) of the trail, including more than 200 miles (320 km) along or near the North Carolina border. The section that runs just below the summit of Kuwohi (formerly Clingmans Dome) in Great Smoky Mountains National Park is the highest point on the trail at 6,625 feet (2,019 m). The trail enters Tennessee from North Carolina atop Doe Knob and exits Tennessee into Virginia atop Holston Mountain.

The first 64 miles (103 km) of the A.T. in Tennessee follow the crest of the Smokies, and are largely shared with North Carolina. In the western Smokies, the trail traverses a young forest that replaced what was once a large highland pasture, most noticeable in areas such as Spence Field, Thunderhead Mountain, and Silers Bald. The trail reaches 6,000 feet (1,800 m) for the first time on the western slope of Mount Buckley, a sub-peak of Kuwohi, where it first enters the sub-alpine spruce-fir forest, and comes within a few meters of the summit of Kuwohi.

The trail crosses U.S. Route 441 at Newfound Gap and traverses a series of rocky cliffs known as "The Sawteeth" en route to the high ridges of the Eastern Smokies. Here, the trail crosses Mount Chapman and Mount Guyot, and passes one of its most remote shelters at Tricorner Knob before gradually descending.

Just beyond Mount Cammerer, the A.T. exits the Smokies, crossing Interstate 40 into the Cherokee National Forest. After traversing Snowbird Mountain, Max Patch Bald, and Lemon Gap (just south of Del Rio), the trail exits Tennessee atop Bluff Mountain and re-enters again atop Rich Mountain (in Greene County), some 10 miles (16 km) to the northeast.

After traversing the Bald Mountains, the Appalachian Trail crosses the Nolichucky River and enters the Unakas, gradually ascending to the Roan Highlands near the town of Roan Mountain in Carter County. Atop Roan High Knob, the A.T. again eclipses 6,000 feet (approximately 6,280 ft or 1,910 m), and passes the highest shelter along the entire trail. After crossing Grassy Ridge, which is the longest stretch of grassy bald in the Appalachians, the trail descends to the Laurel Fork Valley, where it turns west away from the state boundary.

Just beyond White Rocks Mountain, the trail passes through Hampton, Tennessee, before turning north again. At Watauga Lake at the TVA Watauga Dam, the trail turns northeast, crossing Iron Mountain before turning briefly to the northwest at the Carter County-Johnson County line. After passing over Cross Mountain, the trail again turns northeast and ascends Holston Mountain en route to Virginia.

== Virginia ==
Counties crossed: Washington County → Smyth County → Grayson County → Wythe County → Bland County → Tazewell County → Giles County Briefly joins the West Virginia border here → Craig County → Montgomery County → Roanoke County → Botetourt County → Bedford County → Rockbridge County → Amherst County → Nelson County → Augusta County → Albemarle County → Rockingham County → Greene County → Page County → Rappahannock County→ Warren County → Fauquier County → Clarke County → (rejoins the West Virginia Border here) Loudoun County

Virginia has the most mileage of the trail of any state with 550.3 miles (885.6 km) of the trail (one-fourth of the entire trail), including more than 20 miles (32 km) along the West Virginia border. With the climate, and the timing of northbound thru-hikers, this section is wet and challenging because of the spring thaw and heavy spring rainfall.

Substantial portions of the trail closely parallel Skyline Drive in Shenandoah National Park and, further south, the Blue Ridge Parkway. The Appalachian Trail Conservancy considers to be excellent for beginning hikers a well-maintained 104 miles (167 km) section of the trail that the Civilian Conservation Corps constructed in Shenandoah National Park and whose climbs rarely exceed 1,000 feet (300 m).

McAfee Knob is affectionately known as "the most photographed spot on the A.T.". McAfee Knob is part of what is known as Virginia's Triple Crown. The three iconic peaks that make up the Triple Crown are McAfee Knob, Dragon's Tooth, and Tinker Cliffs. These three peaks are located near Roanoke, VA. Hikes to each of the overlooks can be completed individually as day hikes or in one trip as an approximately 35 mile backpacking trip.

The plant life on Virginia's section of the trail includes thickly-growing wild blueberry bushes. The bushes are especially numerous along the trail's central sections, through the Shenandoah National Park, and its northern sections. The blueberries ripen in late summer, offering hikers a plentifully available food source.

In 1989, Hurricane Hugo damaged over 300 miles of the Appalachian Trail in Virginia. Three weeks of rain uprooted thousands of trees in what Mike Dawson of the Appalachian Trail Conference called "the worst break in the continuous footpath since it was declared open from Maine to Georgia in August 1937." Due to responsive and prepared local trail clubs, all but six miles of the trails were re-opened within a month.

The annual "Trail Days" festival held in Damascus has become the largest single gathering of Appalachian Trail hikers anywhere.

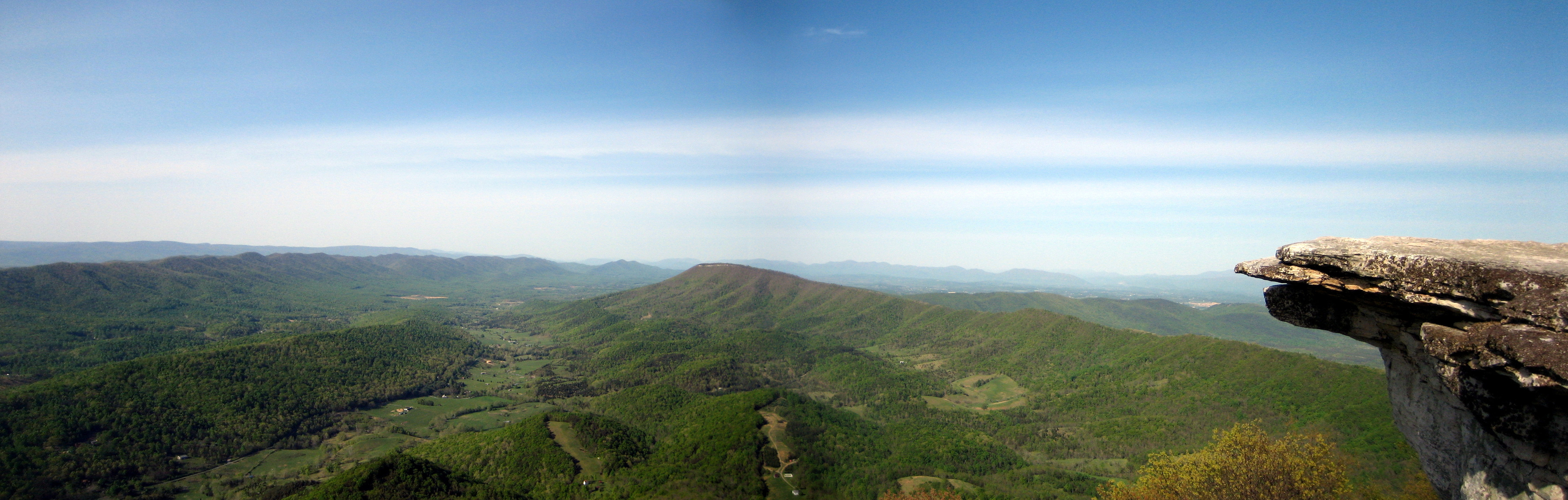
A panoramic image of the Catawba Valley from the McAfee Knob overlook

== West Virginia ==
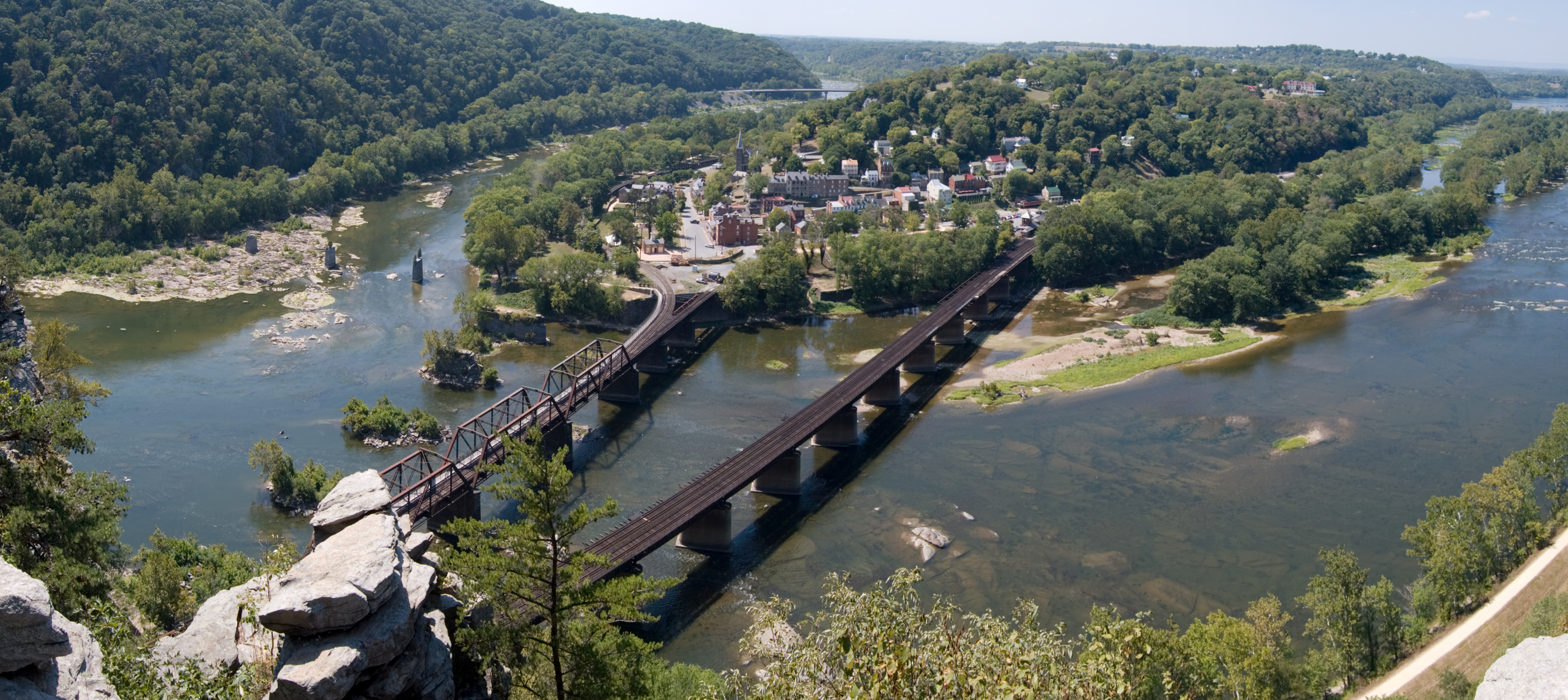
The AT crosses the railroad bridge at left in Harpers Ferry, West Virginia.

Counties crossed: Monroe County (while sharing the trail with Virginia in the south → Jefferson County (while sharing the trail and briefly entering the state.)

West Virginia has 2.4 miles (4 km) of the trail, not including about 20 miles (32 km) along the Virginia border. The trail passes through the town of Harpers Ferry, headquarters of the Appalachian Trail Conservancy. Harpers Ferry is considered the "psychological midpoint" of the AT. The actual midpoint is just west of Pine Grove Furnace State Park in Pennsylvania.

== Maryland ==
Counties crossed: Washington County → Frederick County

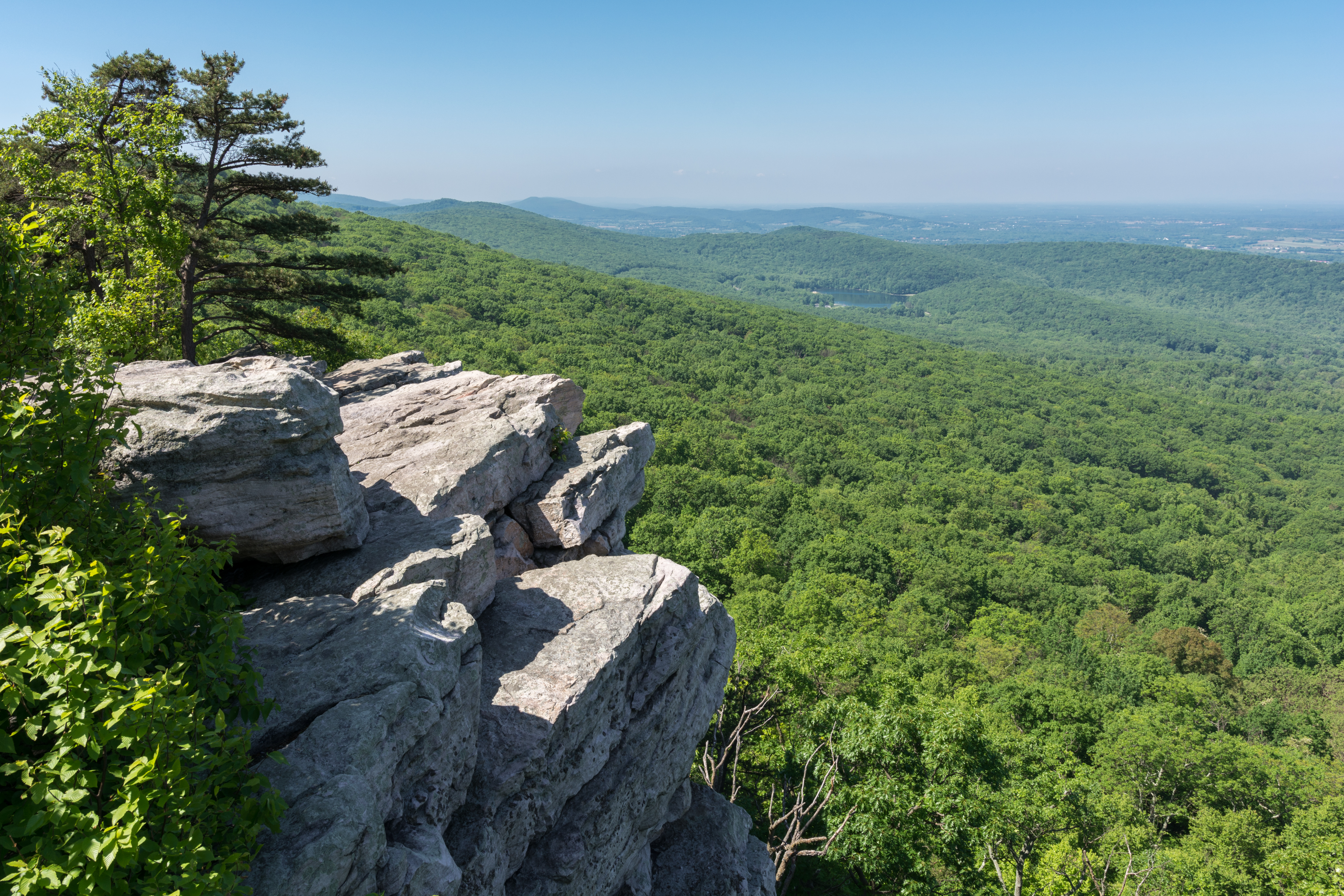
Annapolis Rock Overlook, found along the trail in South Mountain State Park

Maryland has 40.9 miles (65.8 km) of the trail, ranging in elevation from 230 to 1,880 feet (70 to 573 m). Most of the trail runs along the ridge line of South Mountain in South Mountain State Park Hikers are required to stay at designated shelters and campsites, no camping off-trail. Some hikers choose to hike Maryland in a single day, usually starting just before dawn and ending at dusk. This is known as the Maryland Challenge.

The Challenge is especially popular among thru-hikers due to the endurance built up by the time one reaches Maryland from either terminus. A variation of this challenge, known as the Four State Challenge, involves hiking between the ridge line straddling Virginia and West Virginia all the way to or from Pennsylvania in 24 hours, thus hiking in four states in one day. The Four State Challenge requires a hike of approximately 45 miles (72 km), most of which are in Maryland.

The state contains the Ensign Cowell shelter, and the Rocky Run Shelters near Boonsboro. The older log structure was built by the CCC in 1940.

Another stop is the Dahlgren Campground. Hikers can stop here for the night and have free showers. The trail passes close to the eastern edge of Greenbrier State Park. The trail also goes through Pen Mar Park, which is just north of High Rock, which offers views and is a former hang-gliding site.

On March 15, 2015, a hiker was killed near the Ed Garvey shelter in the southern part of the state's portion of the trail when a large tree fell on him.

== Pennsylvania ==
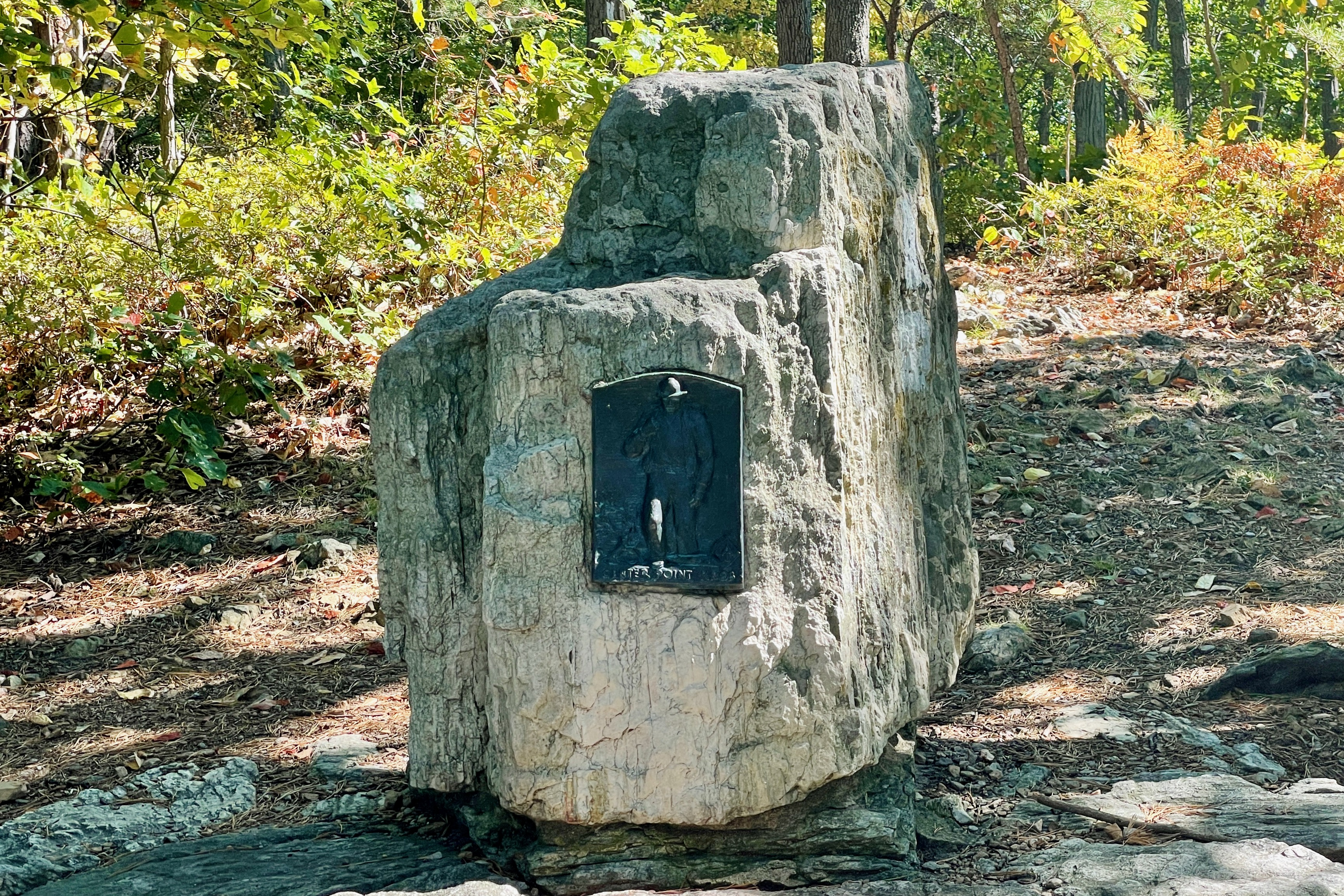
An Appalachian Trail plaque on Center Point Knob

Counties crossed: Franklin County → Cumberland County → Perry County → Dauphin County → Lebanon County → Schuylkill County → Berks County → Lehigh County → Carbon County → Northampton County → Monroe County

Pennsylvania has 229.6 miles (369.5 km) of the trail, extending from the Pennsylvania-Maryland border at Pen Mar, a tiny town straddling the state line, to the Delaware Water Gap, at the Pennsylvania-New Jersey line. The Susquehanna River is generally considered the dividing line between the northern and southern sections of the Pennsylvania AT. The AT crosses the Susquehanna via the Clarks Ferry Bridge, near Duncannon.

In the southern half of Pennsylvania, the AT passes through Caledonia State Park, Michaux State Forest, and Pine Grove Furnace State Park. In 1935, the midpoint of the AT was at Center Point Knob. It is currently in Pine Grove Furnace State Park and marked by a "Midpoint" sign.

These areas in south central Pennsylvania are the northernmost portions of the Blue Ridge Mountains, which are geologically distinct from the Ridge and Valley section further north. The two parts are separated by the broad Cumberland Valley, where the trail has a change of scenery, crossing many farms and large highways. There is no camping allowed in the 18-mile (29 km) stretch between Alec Kennedy and Darlington shelters.

In the northern half of Pennsylvania, the AT climbs back up into the mountains and passes through St. Anthony's Wilderness, which is the second largest roadless area in Pennsylvania and home to several coal mining ghost towns, such as Yellow Springs and Rausch Gap. Trail towns that are common stops with thru-hikers are Boiling Springs, Duncannon, Port Clinton, Palmerton, Wind Gap, and Delaware Water Gap. Northeast of the Schuylkill River, the trail runs along the top of the Blue Mountain ridge.

Just before entering New Jersey, the Blue Mountain ridge becomes the Kittatinny Ridge. The Trail between Swatara Gap and the Susquehanna river was relocated off of Blue Mountain onto Second Mountain and Peter's Mountain in the early 1950s due to expansion of the Fort Indiantown Gap military reservation.

With the description of "where boots go to die", Pennsylvania is infamous among thru-hikers for having more long stretches of rocky trail than any other state, although many feel the rocks are overrated. The worst rocks are in the northern half of the state, north of the Susquehanna River. Many consider Pennsylvania one of the easier parts of the AT, since it is mostly walking on ridges with relatively small elevation changes compared to many other states.

== New Jersey ==
Counties crossed: Warren County → Sussex County → Passaic County

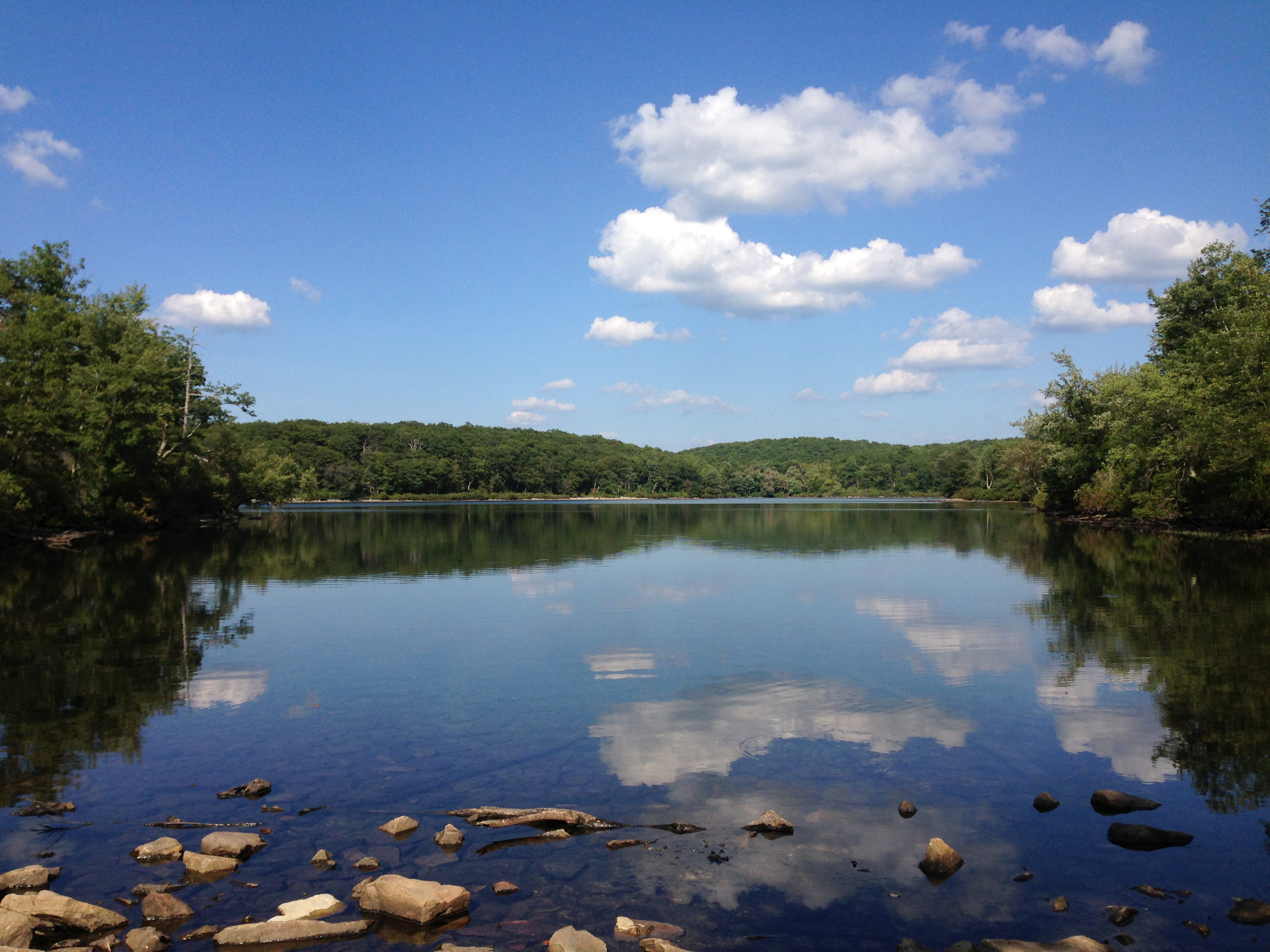
Sunfish Pond on the Appalachian trail in New Jersey

New Jersey has 72.2 miles (116.2 km) of the trail. This makes the New Jersey section of the Appalachian Trail the second longest trail in the state, behind the Delaware and Raritan Canal Trail. More than half of the Appalachian Trail is along the top of Kittatinny Ridge at the northwestern corner of the state.

The trail enters New Jersey from the south on a pedestrian walkway along the Interstate 80 Delaware Water Gap Toll Bridge over the Delaware River. It ascends from the Delaware Water Gap to the top of Kittatinny Ridge in Worthington State Forest, passes Sunfish Pond, continues north through the Delaware Water Gap National Recreation Area and Stokes State Forest. It eventually reaches High Point State Park, highest peak in New Jersey. A side trail is required to reach the actual peak.

The trail then turns in a southeastern direction along the New York-New Jersey border for about 30 miles (48 km), passing over long sections of boardwalk bridges over marshy land. It enters Wawayanda State Park and then the Abram S. Hewitt State Forest just before entering New York near Greenwood Lake. The Appalachian Trail in New Jersey is maintained and updated by the New York–New Jersey Trail Conference.

Black bear activity along the trail in New Jersey increased rapidly starting in 2001. In July 2005, a teenage hiker sleeping at Mashipacong Shelter was awakened by a bear biting his leg. The bear was later identified and killed by authorities. Metal bear-proof trash boxes are in place at all New Jersey shelters.

== New York ==
Counties crossed: Orange County → Rockland County → Westchester County → Putnam County → Dutchess County

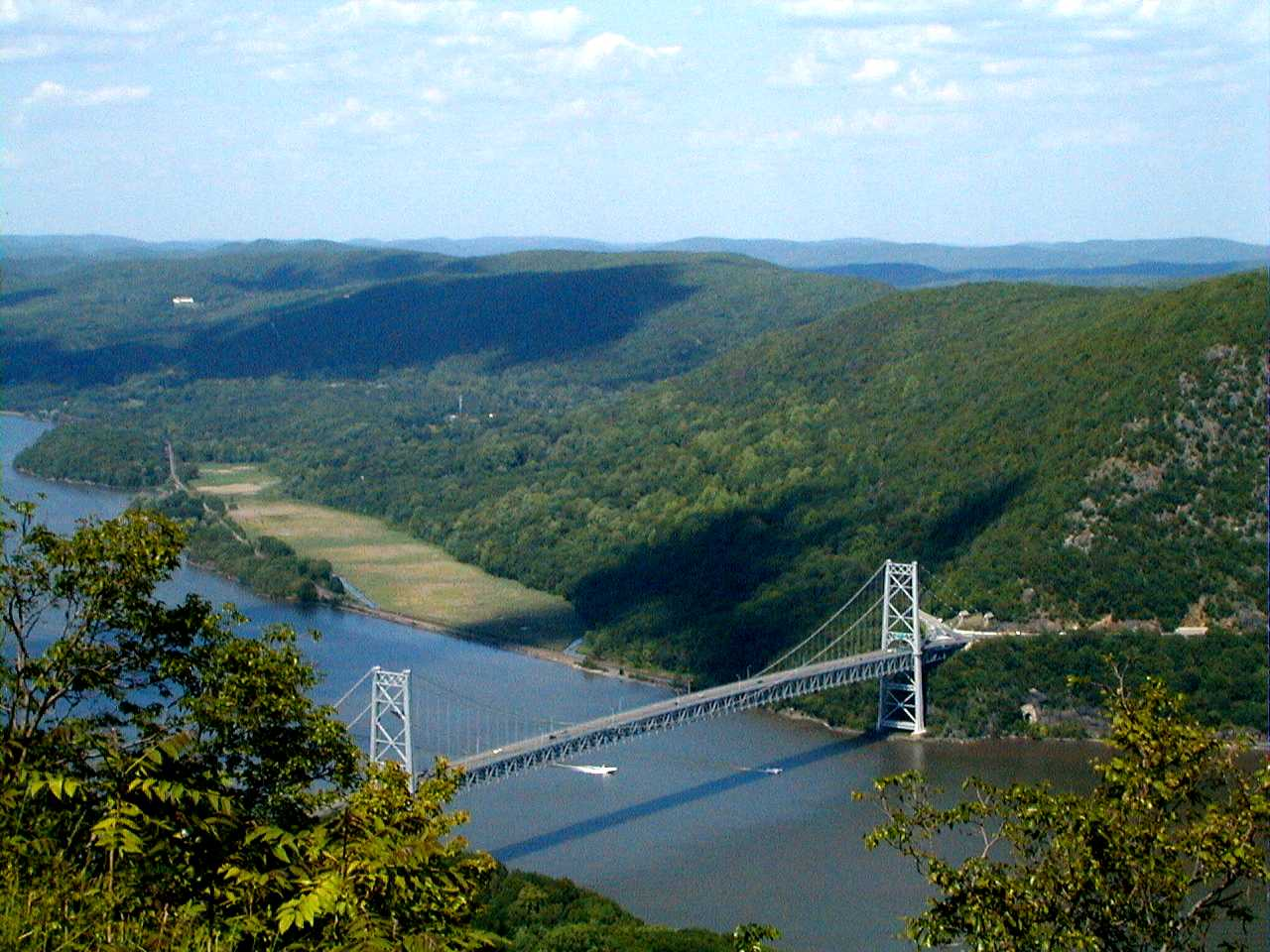
The Bear Mountain Bridge from the top of Bear Mountain

New York's 88.4 miles (142.3 km) of trail contain very little elevation change compared to other states. It is rather rugged terrain nonetheless, with many short though nearly-vertical ledges and small cliffs. From south to north, the trail summits many small mountains under 1,400 feet (430 m) in elevation. Its highest point in New York is Prospect Rock at 1,433 feet (437 m), less than half a mile (800 m) from the border with New Jersey.

The trail continues north, climbing near Fitzgerald Falls, passing through Sterling Forest State Park, and entering Harriman State Park and Bear Mountain State Park. In Harriman State Park, the trail passes through the famous Lemon Squeezer, a narrow crack between huge boulders. At Bear Mountain State Park, it goes through the park zoo, where the lowest point on the entire AT, at 124 feet (38 m) above sea level, is located in front of the bear cage.

Immediately afterwards, it crosses the Hudson River on the Bear Mountain Bridge, then climbs into Hudson Highlands State Park where it follows a ridge over several low-elevation peaks. It then passes through Fahnestock State Park and continues northeast and crosses the Metro-North Railroad's Harlem Line at Pawling, which is also the only train station along the length of the trail.

The trail enters Connecticut via the Pawling Nature Reserve. The section of the trail that passes through Harriman and Bear Mountain State Parks is the oldest section of the trail, completed in 1923. The Appalachian Trail in New York is maintained and updated by the New York–New Jersey Trail Conference.

Professional trail builder Eddie Walsh and Edward Goodell (executive director of the New York–New Jersey Trail Conference) oversaw and coordinated the construction of a paved trail coming off Bear Mountain. That portion of the trail is composed of 800 steps made of 1,000-pound (450 kg) slabs of granite, followed by over a mile of walkway supported by stone crib walls, with boulders called gargoyles lining the path. The project took four years, cost roughly $1 million, and was built by about 700 volunteers. It officially opened in June 2010.

== Connecticut ==
Counties crossed: Litchfield County

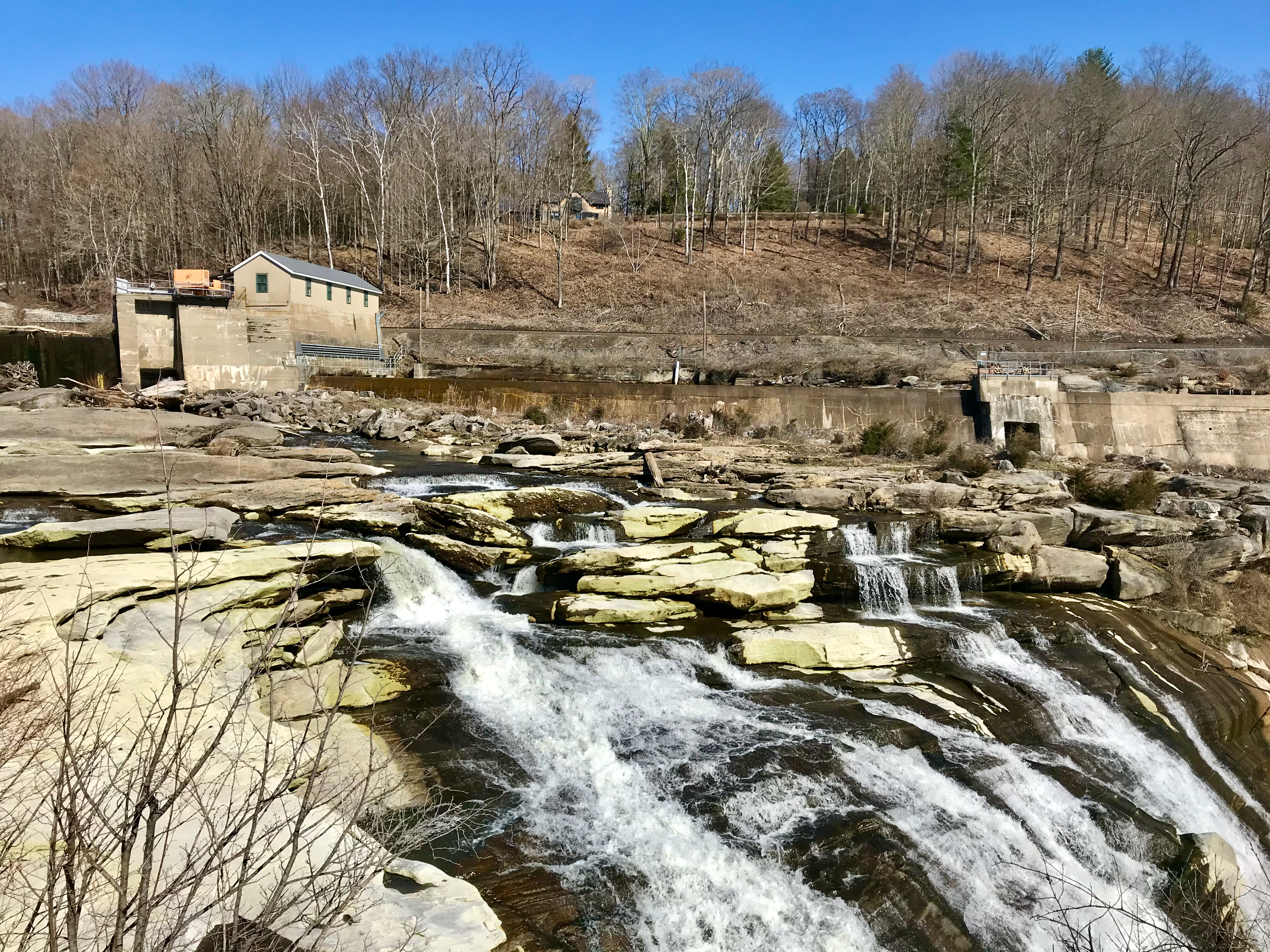
The Housatonic River's Great Falls in Falls Village, Connecticut as viewed from the Appalachian Trail.

The 51.6 miles (83.0 km) of trail in Connecticut lie almost entirely along the ridges to the west above the Housatonic River Valley. The trail climbs ridges above the town of Kent, and then works its way past the Housatonic River to Falls Village, where it regains the heights. After the town of Salisbury, the trail ascends into the Taconic Range, crossing, in order: Lions Head, Riga Ridge, and Bear Mountain, after which the Massachusetts line is achieved at Sage's Ravine.

The trail passes within one mile (1.6 km) of the business district of Kent, a resupply point for long-distance hikers. In the town of Salisbury, in the northwestern corner of Connecticut, it skirts the town center. It reaches the summit of Bear Mountain, the highest peak in Connecticut at 2,326 feet (709 m), descending, and entering Massachusetts. Connecticut's true highest point, on the shoulder of Mount Frissell at the Massachusetts line, lies about 2 miles (3 km) west of the AT, just east of the junction of those two states with New York. Such a side-trip is approximately 5 miles (8 km) long and entails about 1,300 vertical feet (400 m) of climbing.

== Massachusetts ==
County crossed: Berkshire County

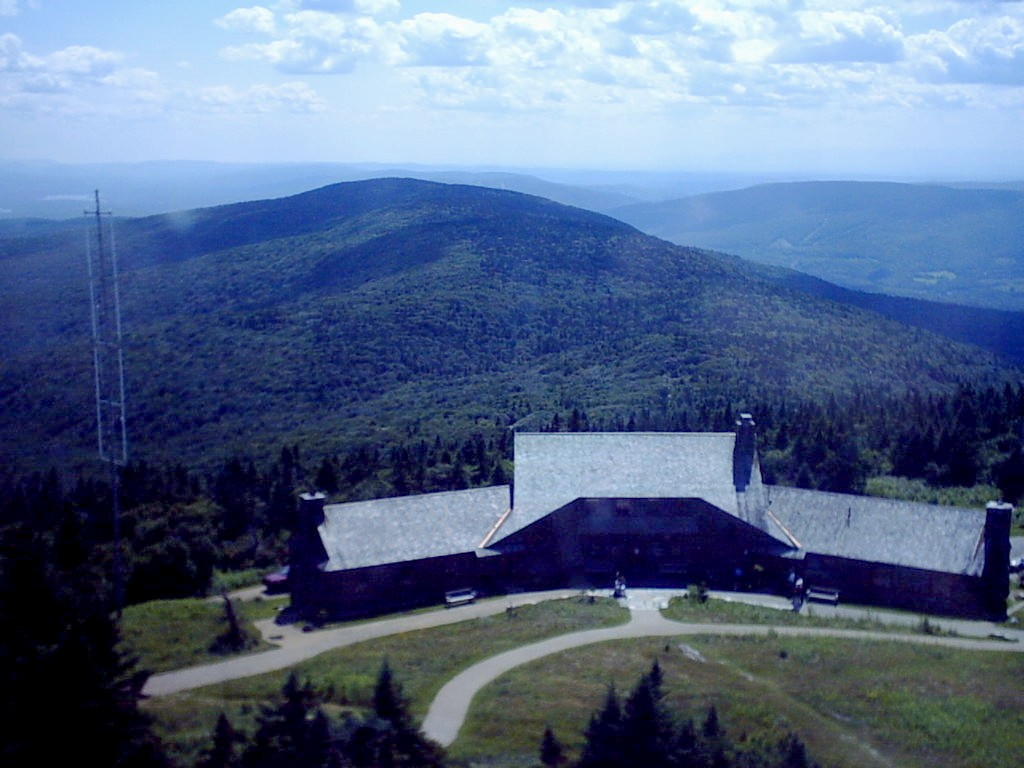
A view from Mount Greylock in Massachusetts

Massachusetts has 90.2 miles (145.2 km) of trail. The entire section of trail is in western Massachusetts' Berkshire County; it traverses both the Taconic Mountains and the Berkshires. The A.T. climbs the highest peak in the southern Taconic Mountains, Mount Everett (2,602 ft or 793 m), then descends to the Housatonic River Valley and skirts the towns of Egremont, Sheffield, and of Great Barrington.

From there, it ascends into the Berkshires and passes through the towns of Tyringham, Dalton and Cheshire. It ascends into the Taconic Mountains again, visiting Mount Greylock, the highest point in the state at 3,491 feet (1,064 m).

It then quickly descends to the valley of the Hoosic River within 2 miles (3 km) of North Adams and Williamstown, before ascending again to the Vermont state line. The trail throughout Massachusetts is maintained by the Berkshire Chapter of the Appalachian Mountain Club.

== Vermont ==
Counties crossed: Bennington County → Windham County → Rutland County → Windsor County

Vermont has 150 miles (240 km) of the trail. Upon entering Vermont, the trail coincides with the southernmost sections of the generally north–south-oriented Long Trail, which is subject to a request by its maintainers to protect it in its most vulnerable part of the year by forgoing spring hiking. It follows the ridge of the southern Green Mountains, summiting such notable peaks as Stratton Mountain, Glastenbury Mountain and Killington Peak.

The trail traverses the Glastenbury, Lye Brook, and Peru Peak Wilderness areas of the Green Mountain National Forest. At Maine Junction, the AT reaches an intersection with the eastern end of the North Country National Scenic Trail. The North Country National Scenic Trail and the next segment of the Long Trail departs to the north. The AT then turns in a more eastward direction, crossing the White River, passing through Norwich, and entering Hanover, New Hampshire, as it crosses the Connecticut River. The Green Mountain Club maintains the entire portion of the AT in Vermont.

The NPS challenged Killington and Pico ski resorts in Vermont over development of private land that crossed the AT.

== New Hampshire ==
Counties crossed: Grafton County → Carroll County → Coos County

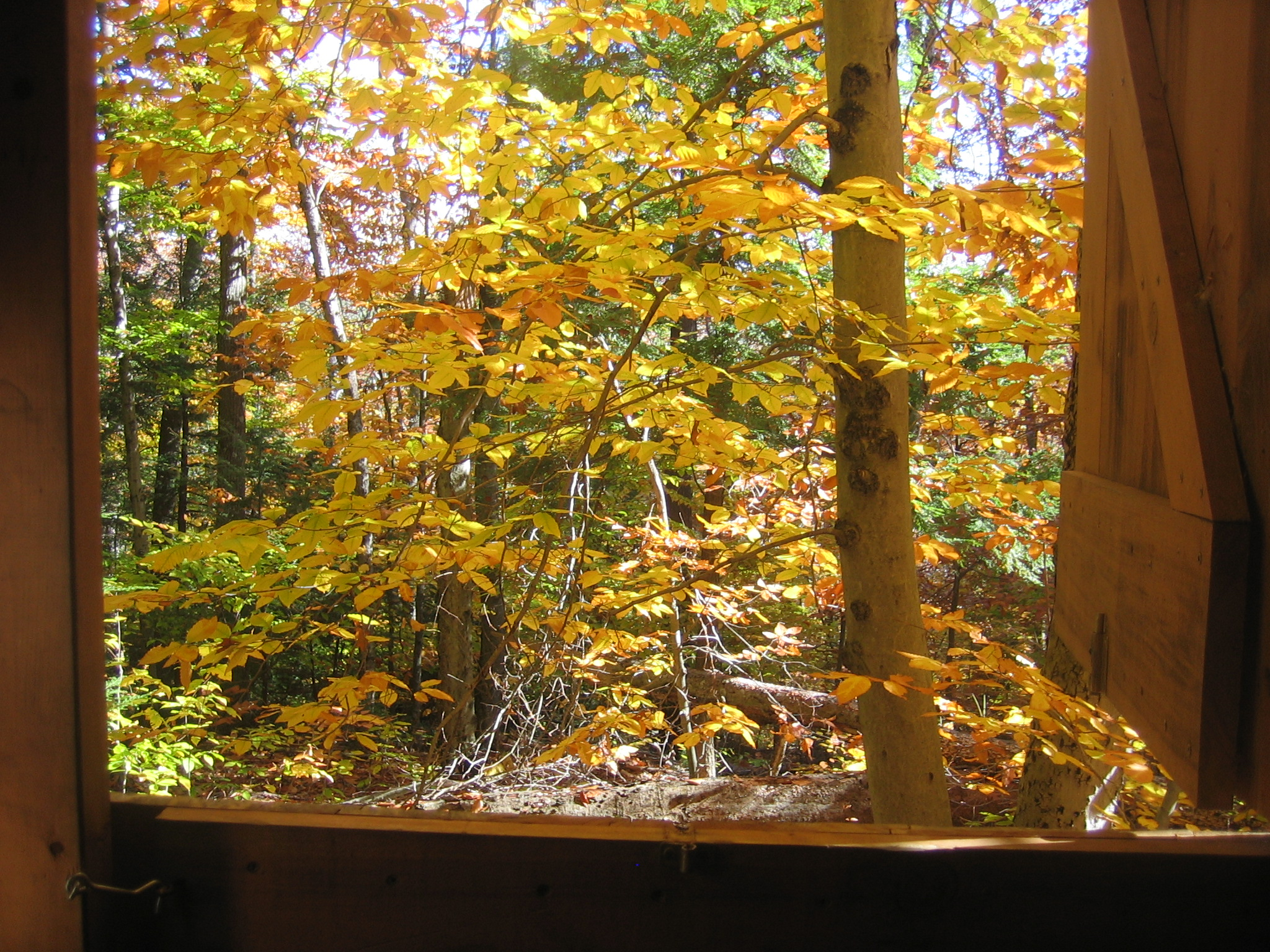
A view from the dutch door of the outhouse at Velvet Rocks shelter showing fall foliage

New Hampshire has 160.9 miles (258.9 km) of the trail. The New Hampshire AT is nearly all within the White Mountain National Forest. The easier southern portion of the trail, from Hanover to Glencliff, passes over Velvet Rocks, Moose Mountain, Smarts Mountain, and Mount Cube. It then ascends Mount Moosilauke and enters the high peaks region of the White Mountains. For northbound thru-hikers, it is the beginning of the main challenges that go beyond enduring distance and time: in New Hampshire and Maine, rough or steep ground are more frequent, and alpine conditions are found near summits and along ridges.

In the Presidential Range of the White Mountains, the trail runs completely above treeline from the summit of Mount Pierce to the north side of the cone of Mount Madison, a distance of about 12 miles (19 km). The AT passes over the summits of 15 of the 48 four-thousand footers of New Hampshire: Moosilauke, South and North Kinsman, Lincoln, Lafayette, South Twin, Jackson, Pierce, Washington (the highest point of the AT north of Tennessee), Madison, Wildcats D and A, Carter Dome, South and Middle Carter.

It comes close to the summits of 9 other of the 48 four-thousand footers: Liberty, Garfield (60 yards away over ledges), Galehead, Zealand, Eisenhower, Monroe, Jefferson, Adams, and Moriah. A series of comfortable huts are maintained along parts of the NH trail by the Appalachian Mountain Club.

In New Hampshire, the Dartmouth Outing Club maintains the AT from the Vermont border to Mount Moosilauke. Randolph Mountain Club maintains 2.2 miles from Osgood Trail near Madison Hut to Edmands Col, with the AMC maintaining the remaining miles through the state.

The trail passes through the town of Hanover and near the town of Gorham, which have grocery stores and are accessible by public transportation (Dartmouth Coach and Concord Coach Lines) from Boston. Concord Coach also has bus service to Lincoln (several miles off the AT) and AMC Pinkham Notch. During the summer season, AMC runs a shuttle service to Crawford Notch and Franconia Notch.

A tradition of thru-hikers Mooning the Cog has developed on Mount Washington.

== Maine ==
Counties crossed: Oxford County → Franklin County → Somerset County → Piscataquis County

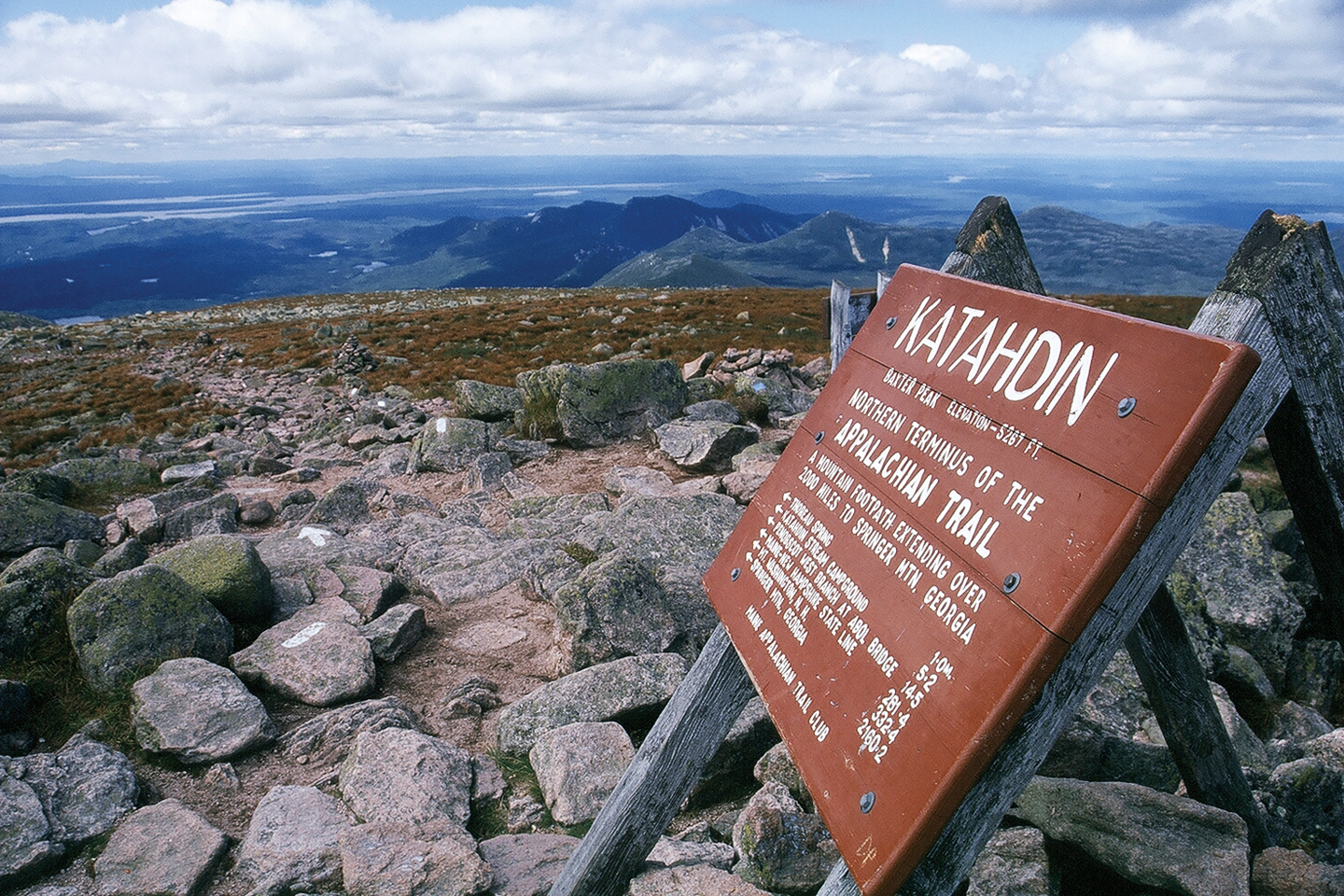
The Northern terminus of the Trail atop Mount Katahdin in Maine

The Appalachian Trail Conservancy (or ATC) believes the 281.4 miles (452.9 km) of the trail in Maine are particularly difficult. The western section includes a mile-long (1.6 km) stretch of boulders at Mahoosuc Notch, often called the trail's hardest mile. The central Maine section crosses the Kennebec River at a point where it is 200 feet (61 m) wide, the widest unbridged stream along the trail.

The last and most isolated portion in the state, and arguably on the entire trail, is known as the "Hundred-Mile Wilderness". This section heads east-northeast from the town of Monson and ends outside Baxter State Park just south of Abol Bridge. More moose are seen by hikers in this state than any other on the trail. The northern terminus of the Appalachian Trail is on Katahdin's Baxter Peak in Baxter State Park.

Baxter State Park closes the summer rules overnight camping season from October 15 to May 15 each year. Park management strongly discourages thru-hiking within the park before May 31 or after October 15. The AMC maintains the AT from the New Hampshire border to Grafton Notch, with the Maine Appalachian Trail Club responsible for maintaining the remaining miles to Katahdin.

The trail runs near Saddleback Mountain resort. Starting in the 1980s there have been frequent discussions about the ski area's development on or near the AT, most recently over the construction of a solar farm and lodge three miles from the trail, which was approved in early 2021.
