= Rocky Run =

Rocky Run may refer to:

- Rocky Run (Brandywine Creek tributary), a stream in New Castle County, Delaware
- Rocky Run (Susquehanna River tributary), a tributary of the Susquehanna River in Luzerne County, Pennsylvania, United States
- Rocky Run (Bull Creek tributary), a tributary of Bull Creek in Butler County, Pennsylvania, United States
- Rocky Run (East Fork Black River tributary), a stream in Wisconsin
- Rocky Run, Wisconsin, an unincorporated community in Portage County, Wisconsin, United States
- Rocky Run, Indiana, an unincorporated community in Parke County, Indiana, United States

== See also ==
- Rocky Run Shelter, backcountry shelters located on the Appalachian Trail near Boonsboro, Maryland
