= Lambs Knoll =

Mountain in Maryland, US

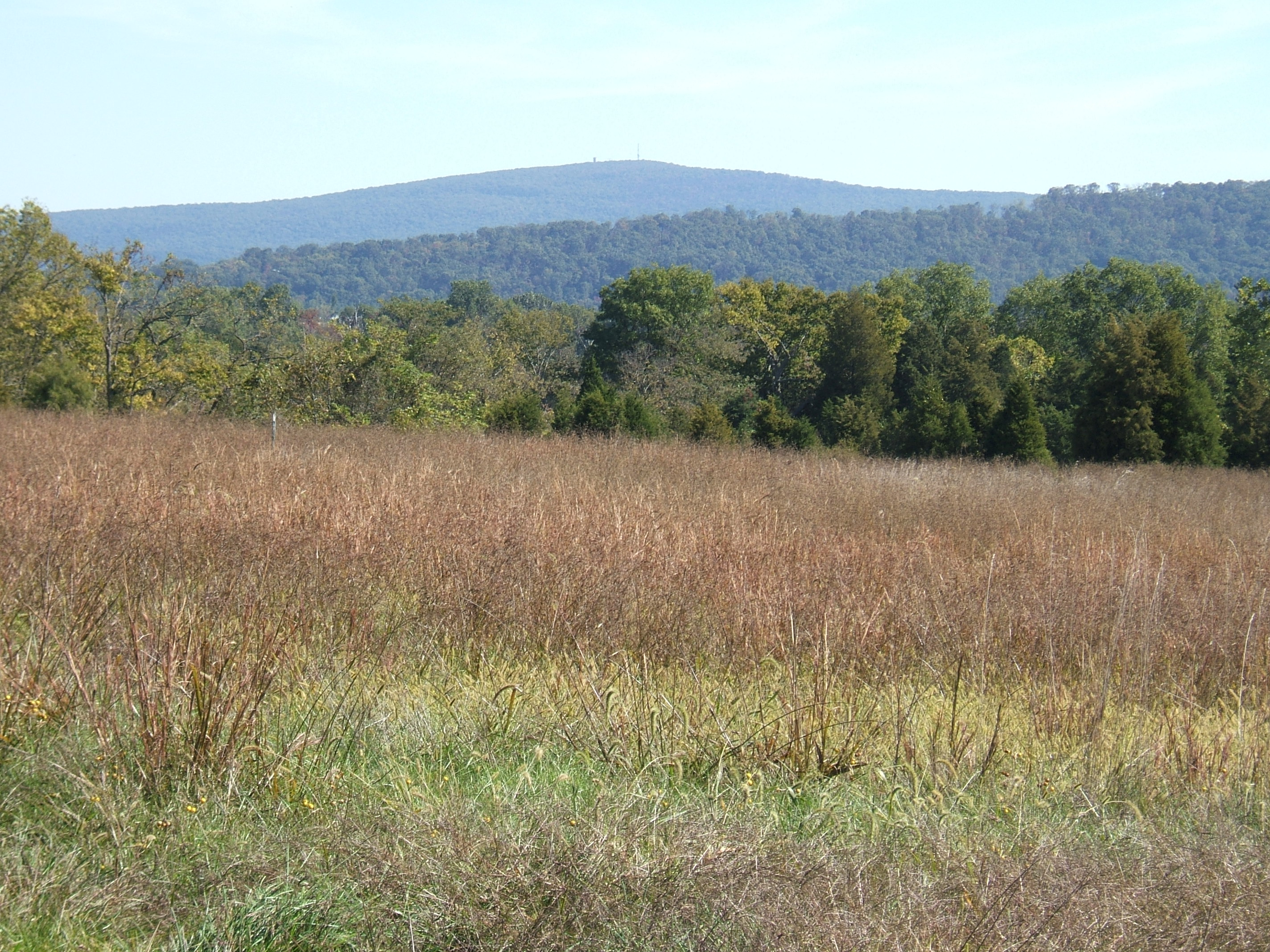
- Lambs Knoll

Highest point
- Elevation: 1,758 ft (536 m)
- Coordinates: 39.448712°N 77.62749°W

Geography
- Location: Washington County / Frederick County, Maryland
- Parent range: South Mountain; Blue Ridge Mountains

Climbing
- First ascent: unknown
- Easiest route: drive up

Lambs Knoll is a peak of South Mountain on the border of Washington County and Frederick County in the state of Maryland. The 1,758 feet (536 m) peak is the second tallest on South Mountain in Maryland behind Quirauk Mountain.

== Geography ==
The peak is located to the south of Fox and Turner's Gaps, and marks the beginning of geographic change in South Mountain from a solitary narrow ridge to a broad highland plateau, as it nears the convergence with Catoctin Mountain.

The Appalachian Trail passes just to the southeast of the summit but a spur trail leads from it to the crest near an old fire tower and former Federal military microwave communications facility and concrete tower, now used by the FAA. Just south of the peak the AT passes by White Rocks which provides the best views from the mountain. The Potomac Appalachian Trail Club maintained Bear Springs Cabin is located on the eastern slope of the mountain.

== History ==
Lambs Knoll was referred to as Lamb's Old Field in the 19th century and is likely named for Milton and Mary Lamb who are believed to have farmed the mountains summit in the 1830s. The old nomenclature persisted through the civil war and possibly in to the 20th century. The first published use of the modern name came in 1934 when the Civilian Conservation Corps erected a fire tower on the summit. The fire tower was staffed through the late 1940s and used by hikers to obtain views of the Middletown and Hagerstown valleys until it was fenced off by the state of Maryland in the 1980s.
