= South Mountain State Park =

State park in Maryland, United States

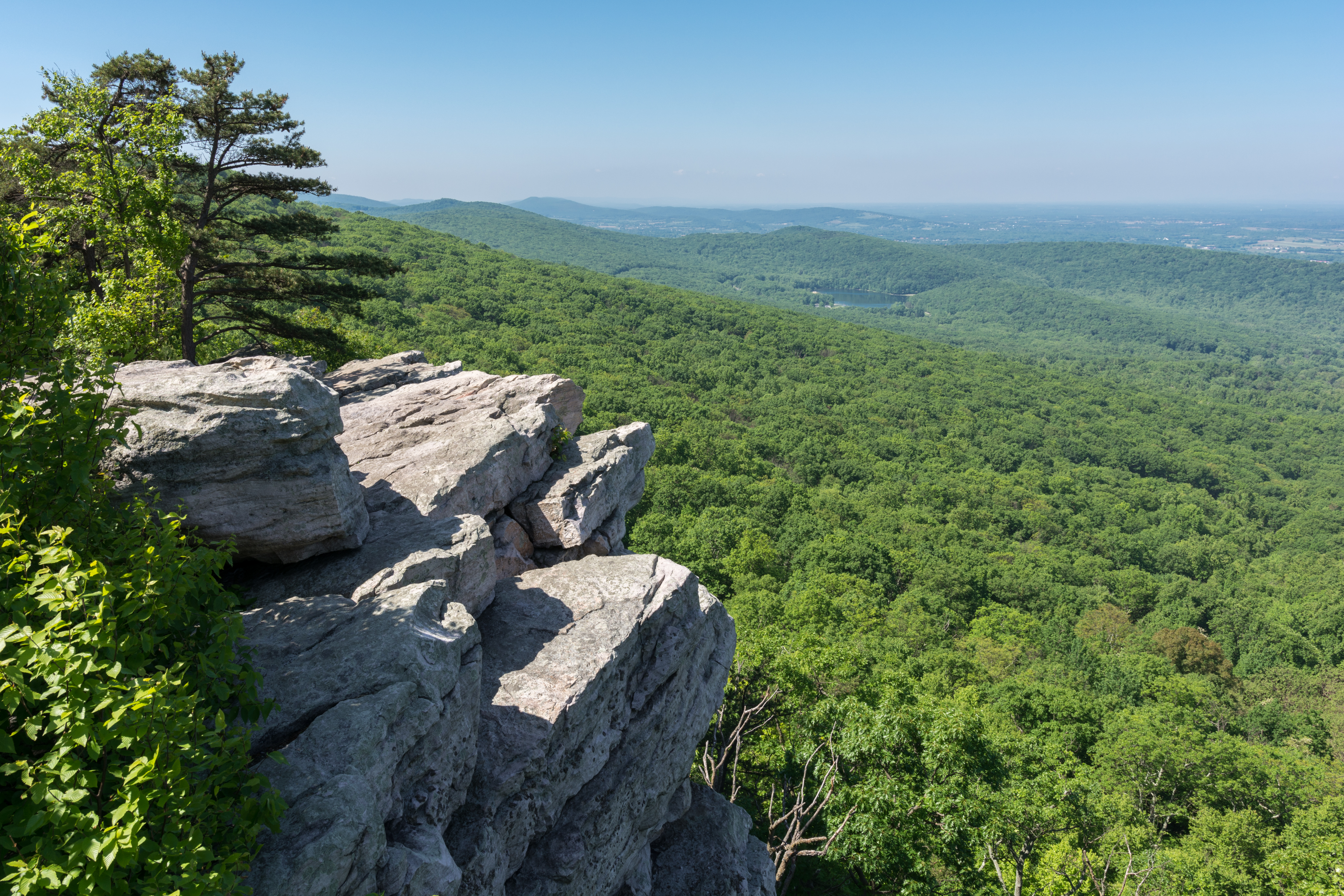
- View from the Annapolis Rock Overlook, found in the central part of the park

- Location within Maryland
- Location: Frederick and Washington counties, Maryland, United States
- Nearest town: Boonsboro, Maryland
- Coordinates: 39°33′39″N 77°35′5″W
- Area: 7,754 acres (3,138 ha)
- Elevation: 1,762 ft (537 m)
- Administrator: Maryland Department of Natural Resources
- Designation: Maryland state park

South Mountain State Park is a Maryland state park that runs for nearly the entire length of South Mountain through Washington and Frederick counties in Maryland. The park is contiguous with several other national, state and local parks on the mountain, including the Chesapeake and Ohio Canal National Historical Park, Gathland State Park, Washington Monument State Park, Greenbrier State Park and Pen Mar County Park.

== Features ==
Maryland's 40-mile (64 km) section of the Appalachian Trail traverses the length of the park, offering access to scenic overlooks that include High Rock, Black Rock, Annapolis Rock, White Rocks, and Weverton Cliffs. The park also contains part of the South Mountain Battlefield. Camping is permitted at shelters and backpackers campgrounds off the AT. The park also has two hunting areas: Black Rock Hunting Lands and Lambs Knoll Hunting Lands.

== Gallery ==
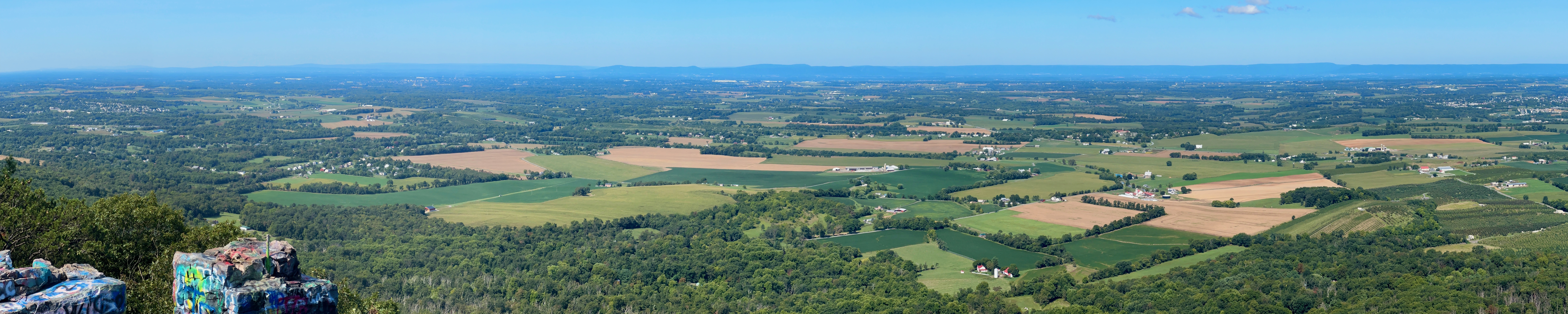
View of the Cumberland Valley from High Rock in the northern part of the park
