= Pen Mar Park =

Park in Washington County, Maryland, United States

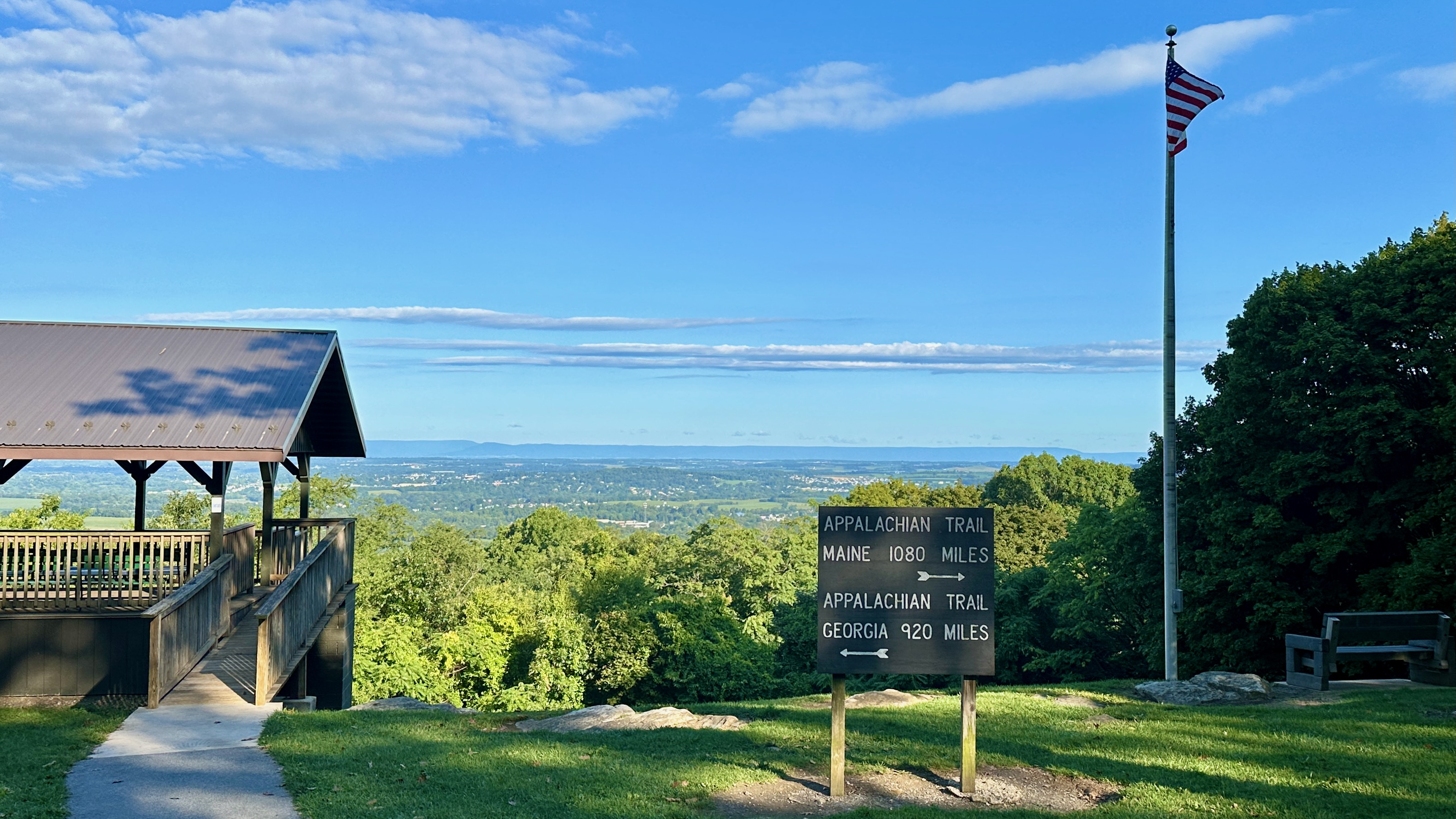
- Vista from the Appalachian Trail in Pen Mar Park
- Interactive map of Pen Mar Park
- Location: Pen Mar, Maryland
- Coordinates: 39°43′1″N 77°30′29″W

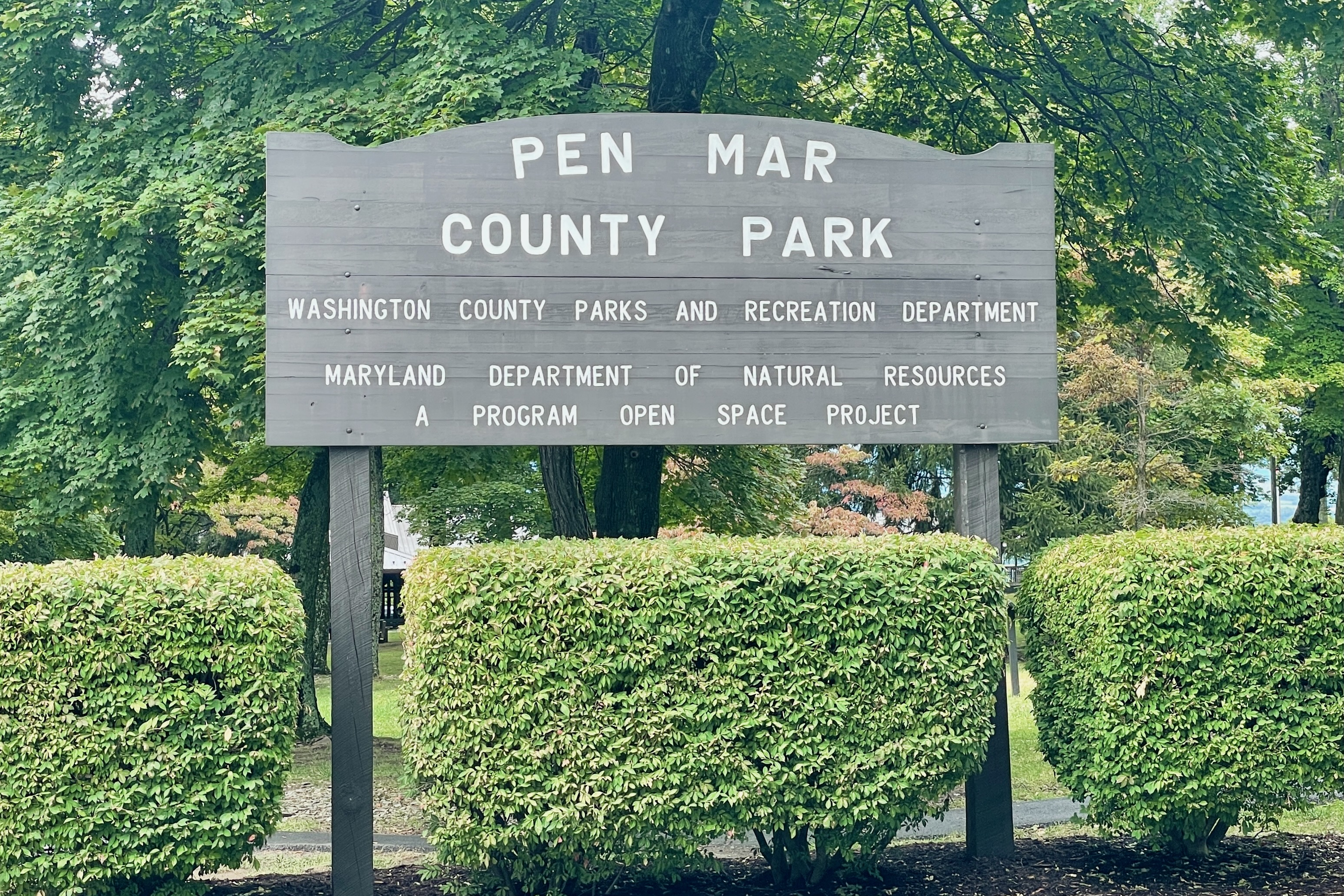
County Park sign

Pen Mar Park is a scenic area and county park in the community of Pen Mar in Washington County, Maryland. It is located on Pen Mar High Rock Road adjacent to the Mason–Dixon line.

== History ==
=== 19th century ===
In 1877, the site was opened as an amusement park and resort area by the Western Maryland Railway (WM). During the summer months the railroad offered frequent train service on its "Blue Mountain Express" from Baltimore to Pen Mar. The WM also ran trains from Hagerstown, Maryland, to Pen Mar.

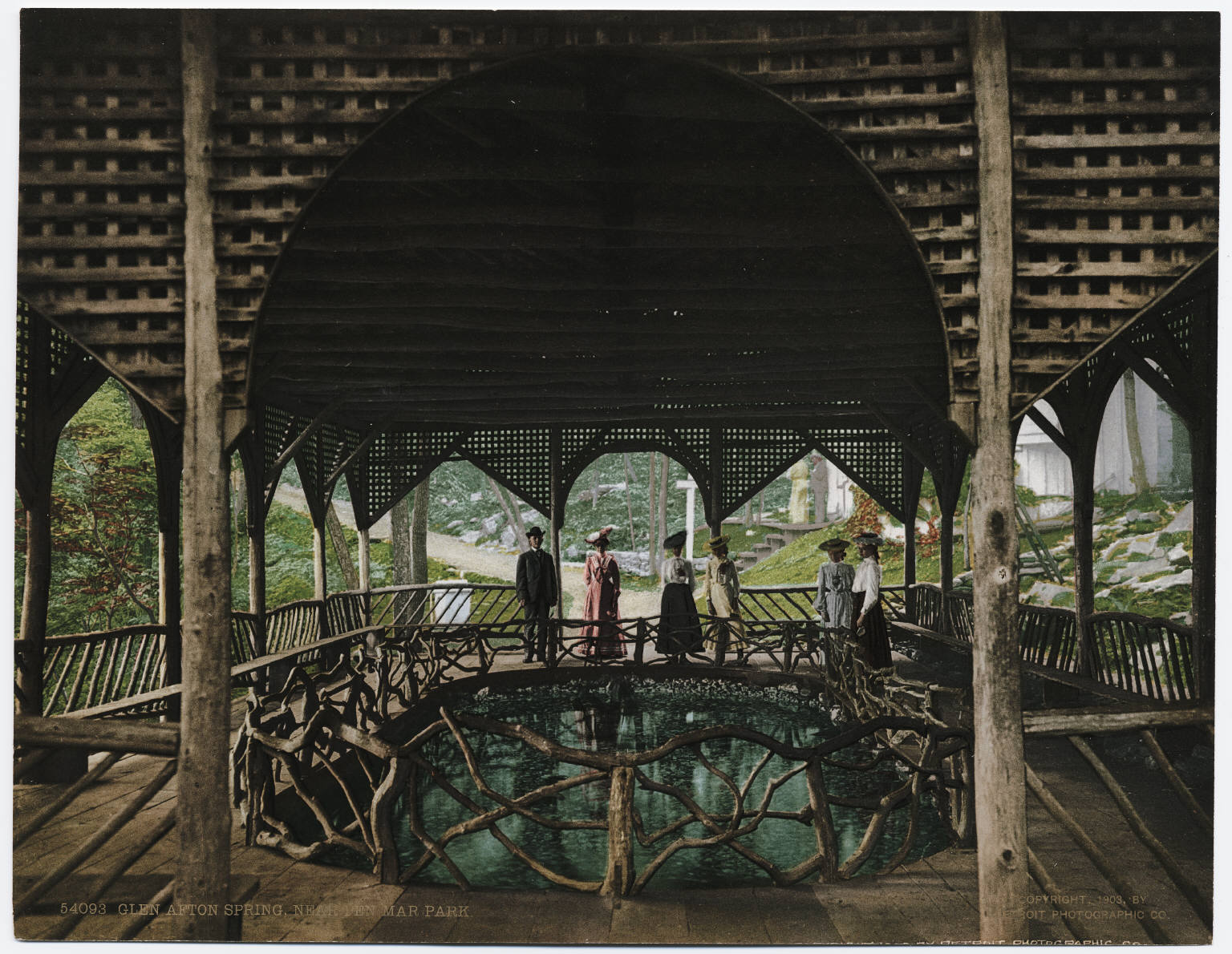
Glen Afton Spring, near Pen Mar Park, in the early 20th century

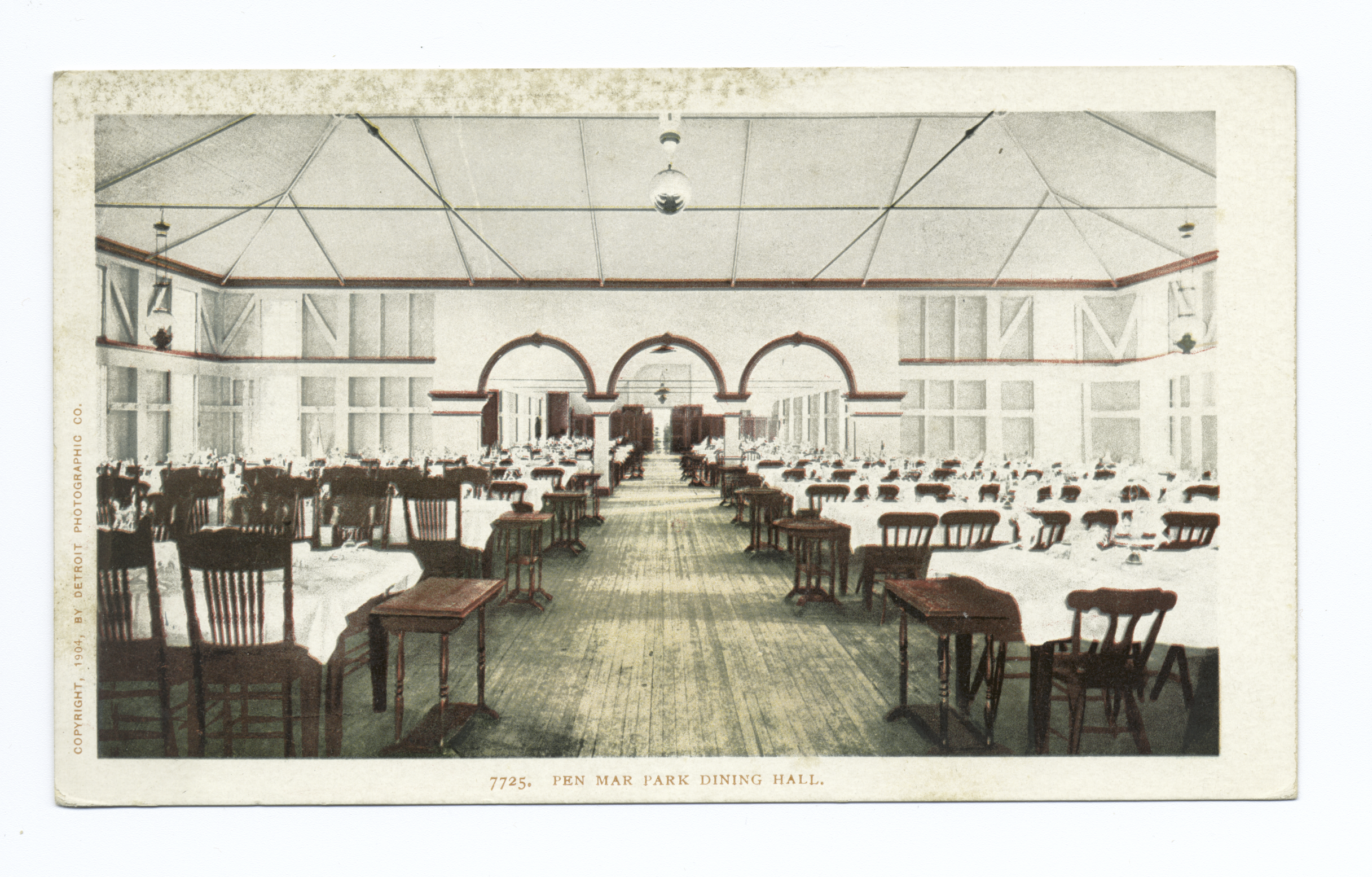
The dining hall in 1898

=== 20th century ===
By the turn of the 20th century, the Pen Mar area had become one of the most popular resort destinations in the eastern United States. Weekday crowds in the summer were often 4,000 to 5,000. The single day park attendance reached close to 20,000 visitors. Many hotels and over 100 boarding houses were built to accommodate the visitors to Pen Mar. Prominent among these lodgings was the Blue Mountain House, built by the WM in 1883, which accommodated 400 guests. WM sold the park in 1930, and the park closed entirely in 1943. By that time the park had contained a roller coaster, carousel, miniature train and railroad station, a dining hall seating 450 people, and a dance pavilion. The park was reopened as a county park in 1977.

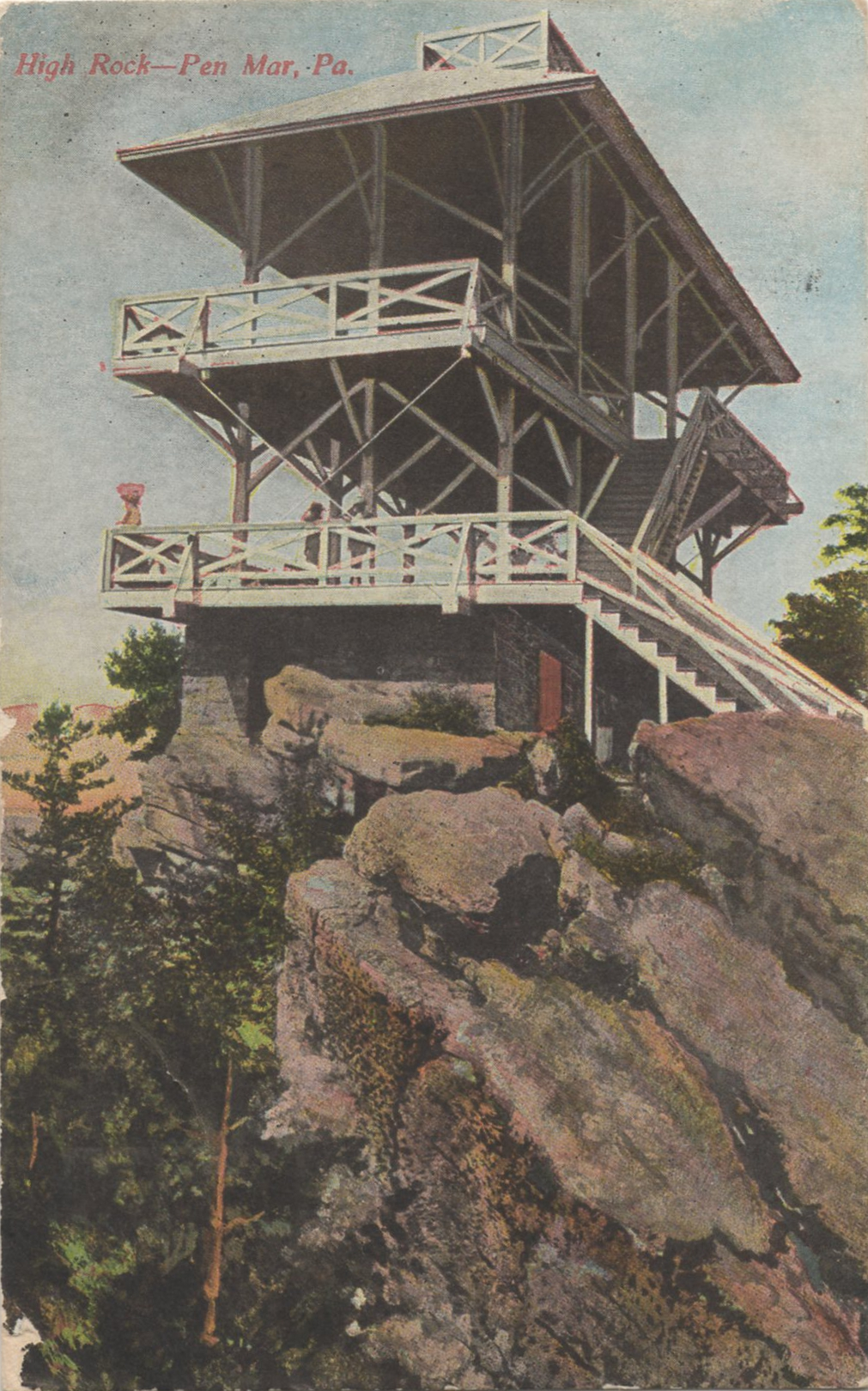
High Rock Observatory, c. 1916

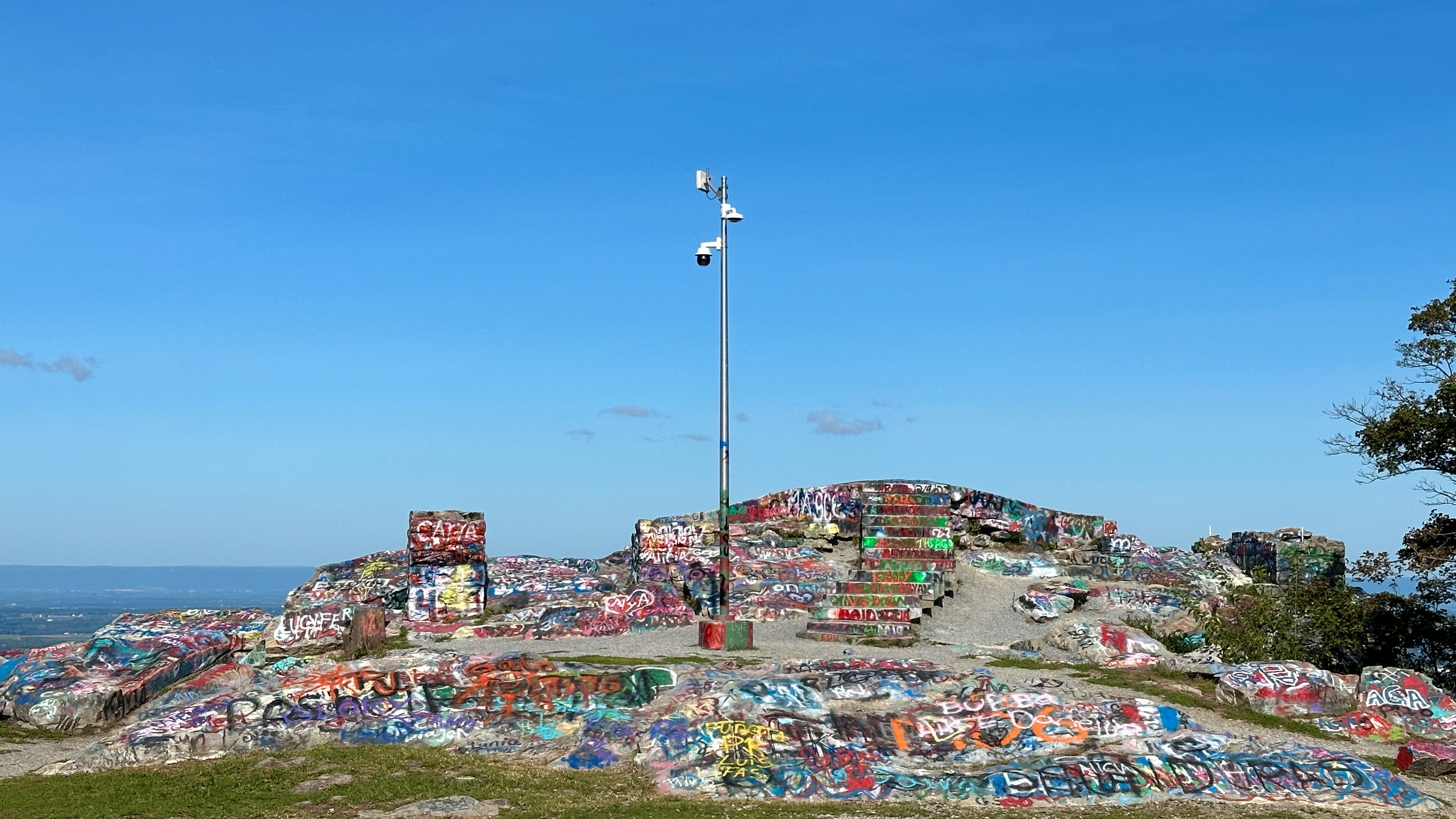
High Rock Observatory foundation, 2024

In 1980, a group of citizens from both Pennsylvania and Maryland raised funds to build a multipurpose, public pavilion at the site of the original dance pavilion. The county currently sponsors dance concerts with live music in the pavilion during the spring, summer and fall seasons. Other attractions include recreation areas in the county park; the Appalachian Trail, which passes through the area; and nearby High Rock Summit in South Mountain State Park. The summit is at an altitude of 1,800 feet (550 m), and provides an outlook near the top of Quirauk Mountain.
