= Kings Gap Environmental Education Center =

State park in Pennsylvania, US

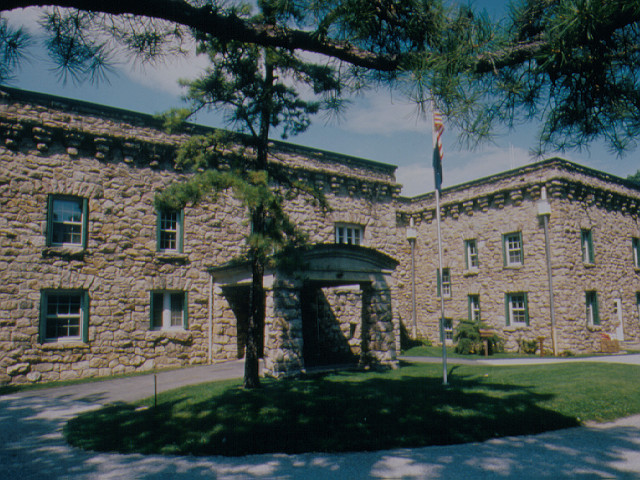

- Location within Pennsylvania Location within the United States
- Interactive map of Kings Gap Environmental; Education Center
- Location: Cumberland County, Pennsylvania, United States
- Coordinates: 40°05′36″N 77°16′06″W
- Area: 2,531 acres (1,024 ha)
- Established: 1973
- Administrator: Pennsylvania Department of Conservation and Natural Resources
- Website: Official website
- Pennsylvania State Parks

Kings Gap Environmental Education Center is a 2,531-acre (1,024 ha) Pennsylvania state park located 2.5 miles (4.0 km) from Pennsylvania Route 233 on South Mountain in Cooke, Dickinson, and Penn townships, Cumberland County, Pennsylvania, in the United States. It is one of four environmental education centers operated by the Pennsylvania Department of Conservation and Natural Resources, where the department conducts environmental education programs for students, teachers, and the public.

== History ==
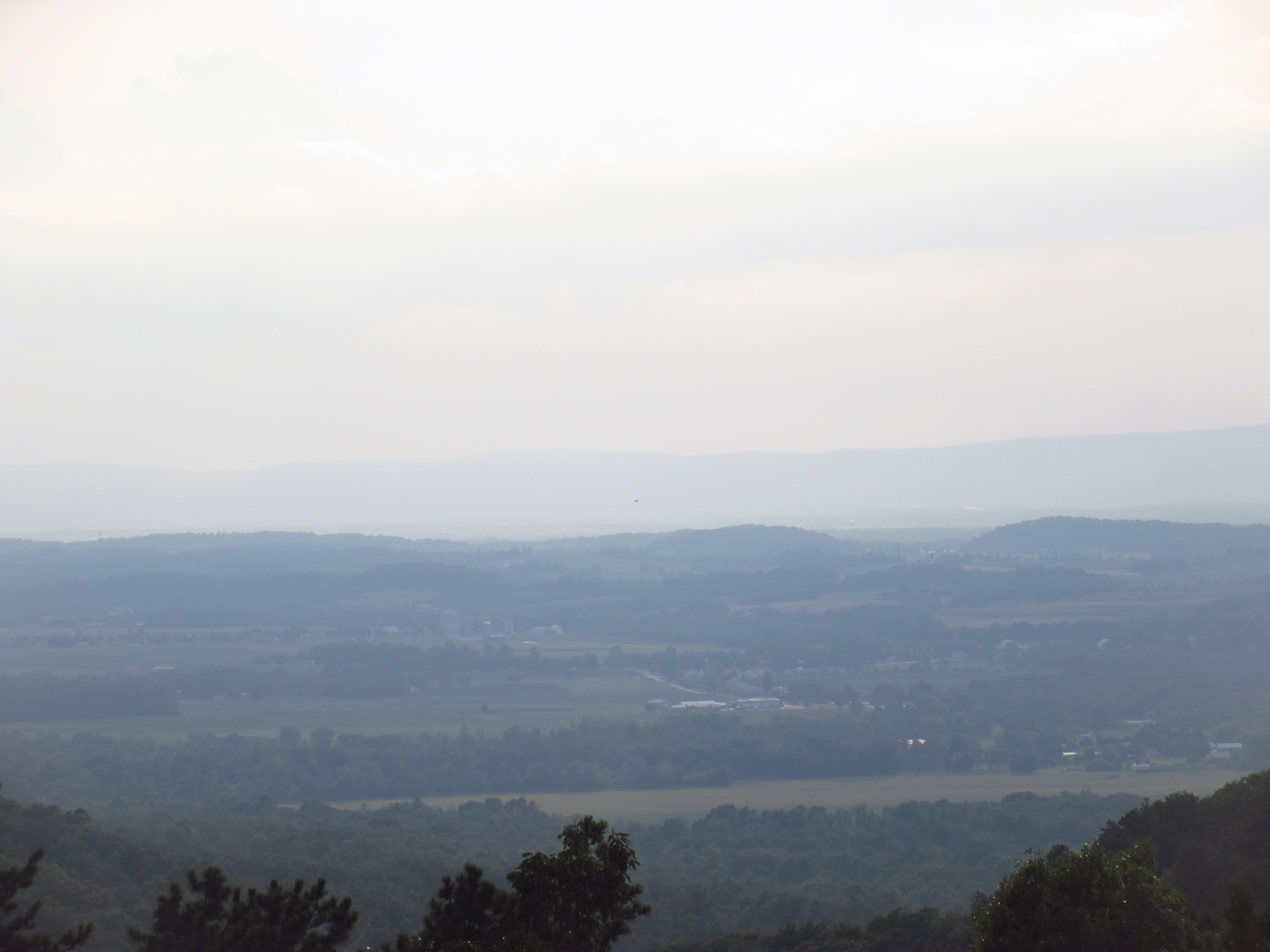
Ridge overlook at Kings Gap

James McCormick Cameron erected the park's 32-room mansion as a summer home around 1908. The C. H. Masland and Son Carpet Company purchased the mansion and its surrounding acreage after Cameron's death in 1949. The Commonwealth of Pennsylvania acquired the land from the carpet company in 1973.

Working through the Nature Conservancy, the Commonwealth of Pennsylvania acquired the mansion and 1,430 acres of land in 1973. The environmental education center opened in 1977 and the training center opened in 1980. In 1991, the training center was renamed in honor of William C. Forrey, retiring director of the Pennsylvania Bureau of State Parks. Forrey served as Bureau Director from 1973 through 1991 and was instrumental in the acquisition and growth of Kings Gap.

== Nature ==
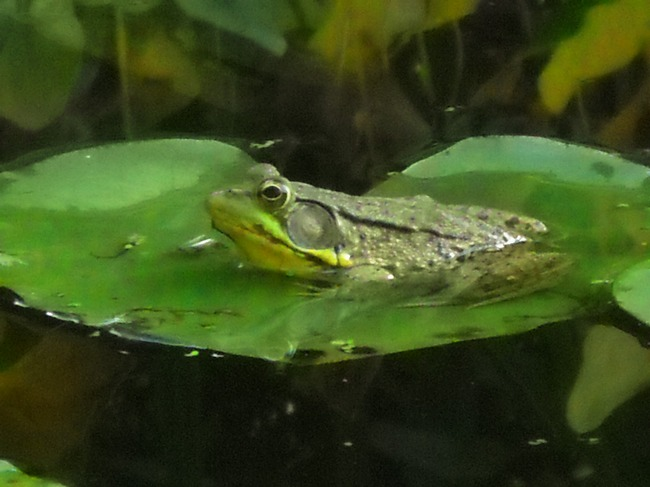
Frog in pond at Kings Gap

Kings Gap Environmental Education Center has a wide variety of wild plants and animals. Turkey vultures can be seen near the summit of the mountain. Reptiles including the box turtle, five-lined skink, copperhead snakes and timber rattlesnakes can also be seen. The plant life is diverse as well. Wild blueberry, huckleberry and mountain laurel can be found in the woods with large stands of chestnut oak, white pine, larch and Douglas fir. Vernal pools appear in the springtime. These pools provide habitats and breeding area for amphibians like wood frogs, spotted salamanders, and spring peepers.

== Recreation ==
Hiking and picnicking are popular activities at the park. Kings Gap has many picnic tables throughout the park to enjoy a lunch packed from home. There are three permanent orienteering courses at Kings Gap Environmental Education Center of different difficulties. The center offers programs on orienteering for beginners in the fall and spring. Hunting is permitted on several hundred acres of Kings Gap Environmental Education Center. Hunters are expected to follow the rules and regulations of the Pennsylvania Game Commission. The common game species are gray squirrels, turkey, and white-tailed deer. There are 25 miles of trails from 19 marked and named trailheads.
