= Rocky Run Shelter =

Appalachian Trail shelter near Boonsboro, Maryland, US

Coordinates: 39.46094°N 77.63087°W

Rocky Run Shelter, Appalachian Trail Maryland Section 5, October 2012

The Rocky Run shelter(s) are backcountry shelters located on the Appalachian Trail near Boonsboro, Maryland. They are situated next to the Rocky Run spring and a steep hill side. The original Rocky Run shelter sleeps six people, has a flat floor, and provides enough space to sit up. The new shelter can sleep up to sixteen and features a wood floor and a plywood-floored loft, as well as a covered front deck and large windows which flood the shelter with light. Accommodations available include two decks, a grill pit, porch swing, and semi-enclosed privy.

== Location ==
The Rocky Run shelters are located on the western slope of South Mountain just south of Boonsboro. The shelters are situated about .2 miles (0.32 km) off the Appalachian Trail, and are connected to the main trail by a spur. Rocky Run is a 5-mile (8.0 km) hike from the Crampton Gap Shelter (going south) and 7.5 miles (12.1 km) from the Pine Knob shelter (going north).

== History ==
The original shelter was built in 1940 by the Civilian Conservation Corps (CCC) and completed in 1941 by the Potomac Appalachian Trail Club (PATC) which currently maintains 240 miles of the Appalachian Trail from Pennsylvania to Virginia and an additional 1,000 miles of trails elsewhere in the region. The shelter is one of 15 remaining shelters built by the CCC on the Appalachian Trail, and of even fewer made from logs rather than stone. After falling into disrepair, the PATC considered tearing it down and building a larger one. However, noting its historical significance, the shelter was repaired in 2008.

Volunteer crews also built another log shelter and a privy nearby. A new shelter costs about $7,000-$9,000 and takes 8–12 months of volunteer labor to build.

== Popularity ==
The section of the Appalachian Trail in which Rocky Run is situated, consisting mostly of old logging roads, is considered one of the easier stretches of the trail. It is popular for this reason, and also because there are beautiful overlooks and historic Civil War sites nearby. Peak use season is around June, when there may be 10-15 people looking to use the shelters on any given weekday.
