= Hagerstown Valley =

Coordinates: 39°26′23″N 77°45′17″W

Hagerstown Valley is located in Maryland in the United States. It is part of the Great Appalachian Valley, which continues northward as Cumberland Valley in Pennsylvania, and southward as Shenandoah Valley in West Virginia and Virginia.

Hagerstown Valley is bounded on the east by South Mountain, part of the Blue Ridge Mountains. On the west the valley is bounded by the Bear Pond Mountains — a range of mountains linking Blue Mountain and North Mountain.

The valley is bounded on the south by the Potomac River and on the north by the drainage divide between Conococheague Creek, which flows south to the Potomac River, and Conodoguinet Creek, which flows northeast to the Susquehanna River. Sometimes the boundary between Hagerstown Valley and Cumberland Valley is defined politically, as the state line between Maryland and Pennsylvania.

The political definition restricts Hagerstown Valley to Washington County, Maryland, while the larger definition includes part of Franklin County, Pennsylvania as well. Sometimes Cumberland Valley is defined so as to include Hagerstown Valley entirely, extending south all the way to the Potomac River.

Antietam Creek flows through Hagerstown Valley to the Potomac River. Antietam National Battlefield is also in the valley, where the Battle of Antietam was fought during the American Civil War.

The main cities are Hagerstown, Maryland and Waynesboro, Pennsylvania. The water divide between Hagerstown and Cumberland valleys occurs near the city of Chambersburg, Pennsylvania.
