= Rocky Run (East Fork Black River tributary) =

Stream in Wisconsin, U.S.

Coordinates: 44°23′19″N 90°14′02″W

Rocky Run is a stream in the U.S. state of Wisconsin. It is a tributary to the East Fork Black River.

Rocky Run was so named on account of its rocky character.
