= Quirauk Mountain =

Mountain in Washington County, Maryland, United States

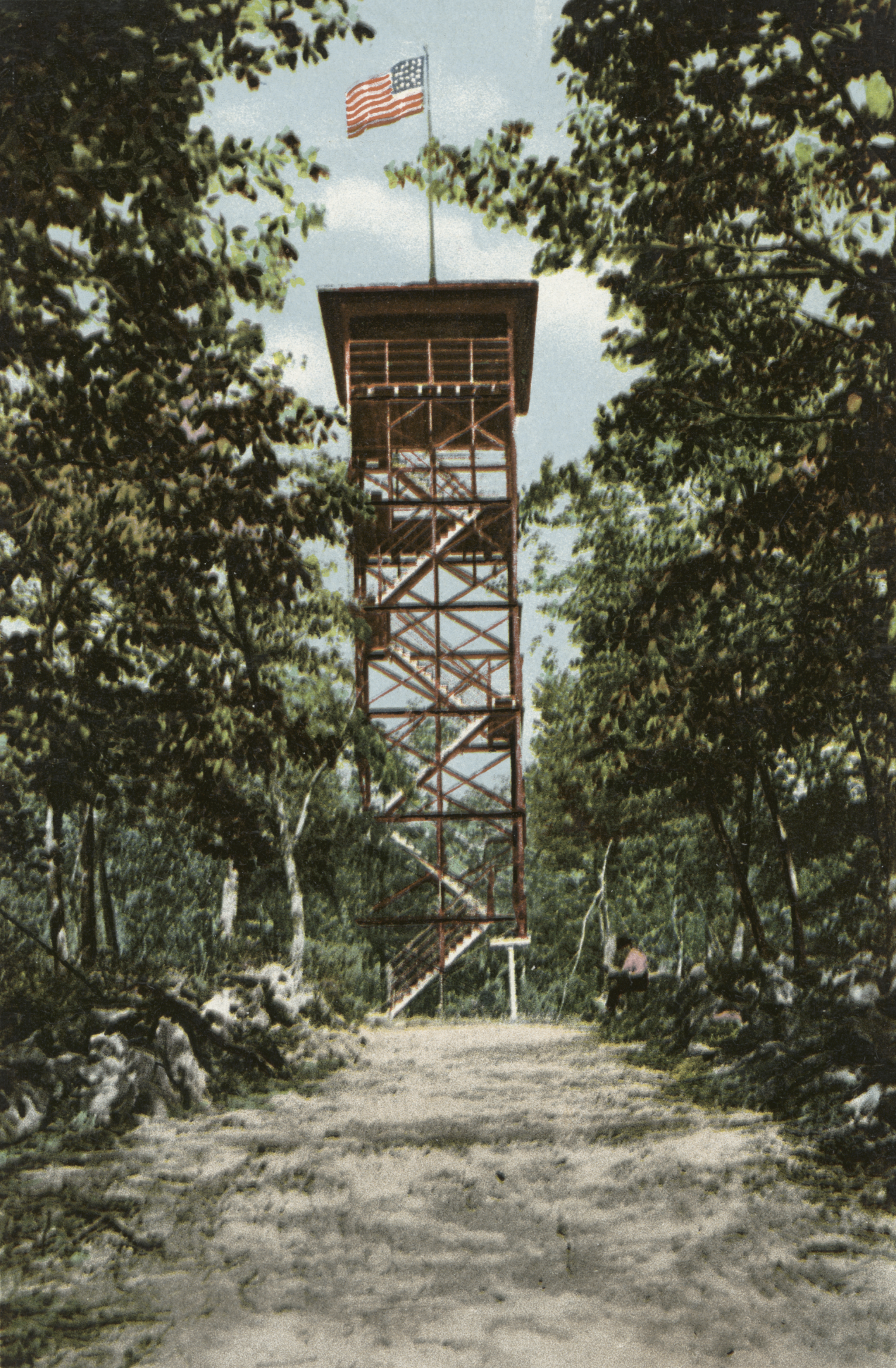
- Former observation tower on Quirauk Mountain

Highest point
- Elevation: 2,145 ft (654 m)
- Coordinates: 39°41′47″N 77°30′46″W

Geography
- Location: Washington County, Maryland, U.S.
- Parent range: South Mountain, Blue Ridge Mountains

Climbing
- Easiest route: drive

Quirauk Mountain is the highest point on South Mountain. The 2,145-foot (654 m) peak is located in northeastern Washington County, Maryland. It lies just southwest of Fort Ritchie Military Reservation in the village of Cascade and about 1/2 mile southeast of the community of Blue Mountain. The Appalachian Trail and South Mountain State Park are about 1/2 mile to the west of the mountain's summit.

== Background ==
On the summit is a broadcast tower for radio stations WETH-FM and WAYZ-FM in Hagerstown and "Site C", a radio communication outpost of the Alternate Joint Communications Center, a United States Department of Defense emergency relocation site near Blue Ridge Summit, Pennsylvania. There is a fenced-in area of the mountaintop that is federal property and thus a restricted area. Quirauk Mountain's broadcast tower was formerly used by radio stations WJEJ-AM and WWMD-FM. A fire lookout tower also used to occupy the summit. It was originally part of the original Pen-Mar resort, being converted into one shortly after. Although it is not used in the same way it used to be, it still stands today, mostly covered from view because of the treeline. It is used for telecommunications on "Site C", mentioned earlier. It is the smallest tower on the site. It is the tower with stairs (bottom stairs removed) on the photos.

About 1/2 mile to the west-southwest of the summit is High Rock near the Appalachian Trail, which provides an excellent view of the surrounding countryside.

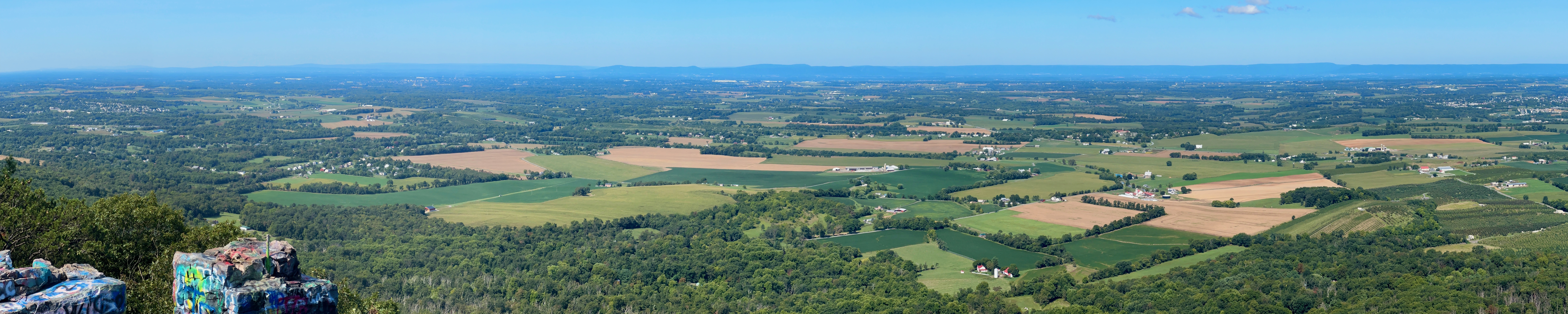
View from High Rock of the Cumberland Valley
