= Pen Mar, Maryland =

Unincorporated community in Maryland, United States

- Unincorporated community
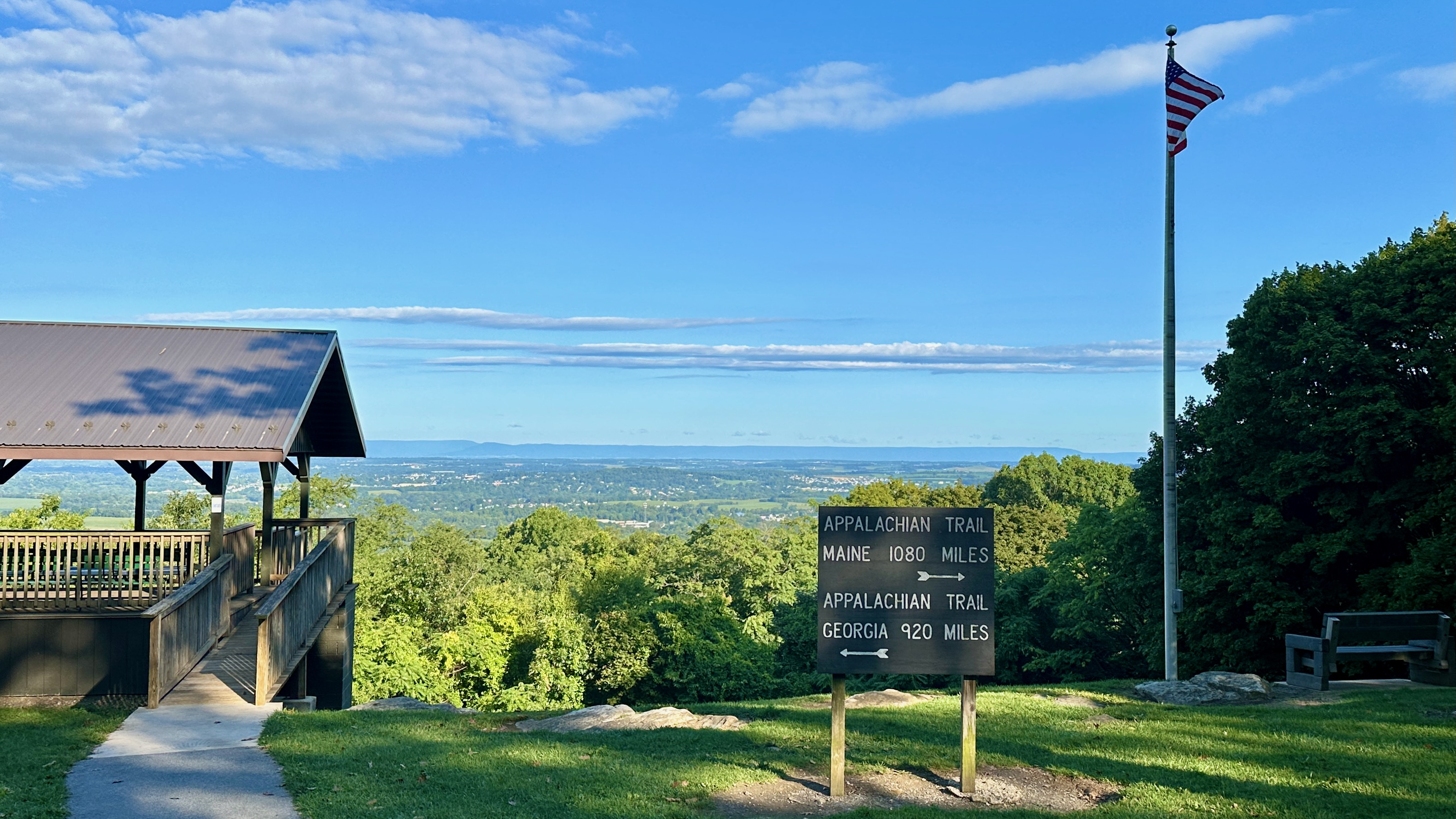
- Vista from the Appalachian Trail in Pen Mar Park

- Location within Maryland Location within the United States
- Coordinates: 39°43′4″N 77°30′23″W
- Country: United States
- State: Maryland
- County: Washington
- Elevation: 1,322 ft (403 m)
- Time zone: UTC-5 (Eastern (EST))
  - Summer (DST): UTC-4 (EDT)
- ZIP code: 21719
- Area code: 301
- FIPS code: 24-043
- GNIS feature ID: 590993

Pen Mar is an unincorporated community in Washington County, Maryland, United States. It is one of the border towns in the United States with a portmanteau name. Located on the Mason–Dixon line, it is bordered to the north by the community of Pen Mar, Pennsylvania. The community came to prominence as a resort in the 20th century after the construction of Pen Mar Park by the Western Maryland Railway. While the resort has long been dismantled, the area still has some significance in Maryland, since it is the northern starting point for the Maryland section of the Appalachian Trail.

== History ==
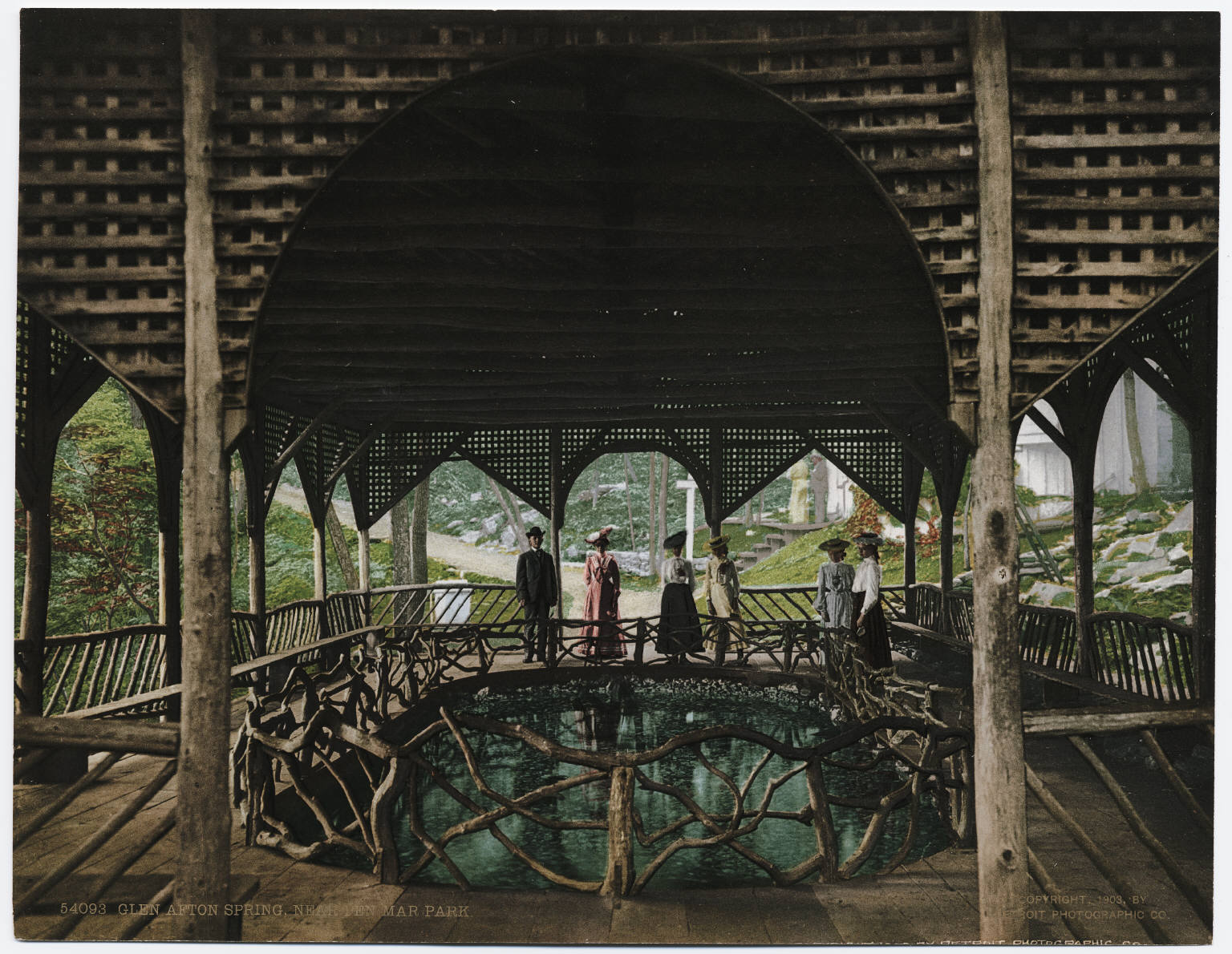
Glen Afton Spring, near Pen Mar

The Pen Mar area became prominent in the late 19th century with the development of a formal resort there in 1877. Colonel John Mifflin Hood rightly believed that a resort area in the Blue Ridge Mountains would encourage the public to use his trains from the Western Maryland Railroad to travel to the area. Not only did the Western Maryland Railroad develop a resort but also an amusement park that included a scenic lookout, roller coaster, movie theater, dance pavilion, picnic shelter, miniature train, photo studio, concession stand, carousel with a penny arcade, dining hall and children's playground. The park was a huge success with thousands of visitors taking the 71-mile trip from Baltimore to Pen Mar. The single day park attendance reached close to 20,000 visitors.

The growth of the park naturally led to the growth of the village of Pen Mar. The town of Pen Mar was officially incorporated in 1920 with an act to add new sections to Article 22 of the code of public laws of Maryland. The town had a post office, many hotels and over 100 boarding houses during this time of growth. Yet, strangely enough, the act to incorporate the town was repealed in 1922.

The end of the 1920s started the demise of the once glorious park. By the end of the decade "virtually no one travelled here by train." By 1929 the park was not turning a profit for the Western Maryland Railroad. The park was subsequently leased to a private investor who was able to keep the park going until 1943. With the fall of the park, the fall of the surrounding area came as no surprise. The Pen Mar post office officially closed in the 1960s and the area slowly dwindled in size and stature within the state of Maryland.

In 1953 a petition was circulated in the Pen Mar community, in support of creating a state park at the former resort site. Pen Mar was designated a state park in 1963–64. However, for unknown reasons the park was never made into a Maryland state park. The park was sold to Washington County, Maryland and turned into a county park, which opened in 1977. Additions to the park since then have included a scenic overlook and a multi-use pavilion. In 1978 a nomination form was prepared to describe a "Pen Mar Historic District" for the National Register of Historic Places, but no further actions on this nomination are noted.

== Geography ==
Pen Mar is located on the border of Maryland and Pennsylvania on South Mountain. The village is at an altitude of 1,322 feet (403 m) above sea level. The area overlooks one of the breaks in the mountain range giving views of the surrounding mountains and valleys.

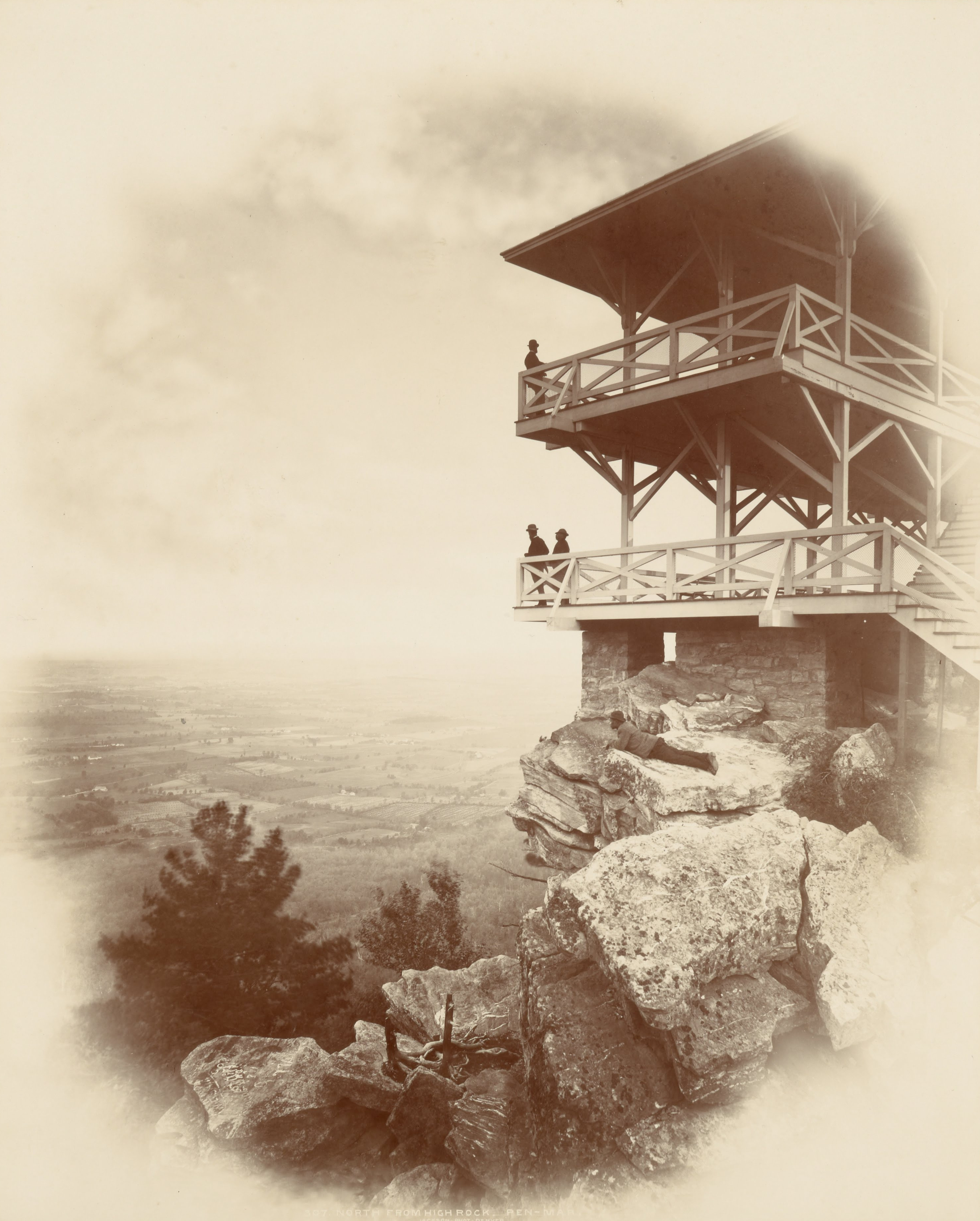
High Rock Observatory, c. 1880

To the south of Pen Mar is High Rock, a recreational site within South Mountain State Park. The site is close to the Appalachian Trail, features a popular overlook and was formerly used as a hang glider launch site.

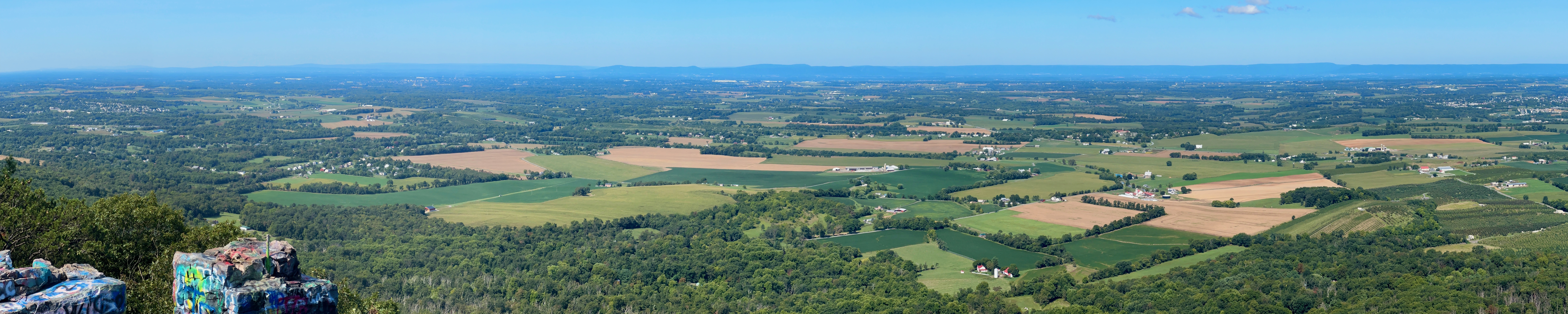
View from High Rock of the Cumberland Valley
