= Greenbrier State Park =

State park in Maryland, United States

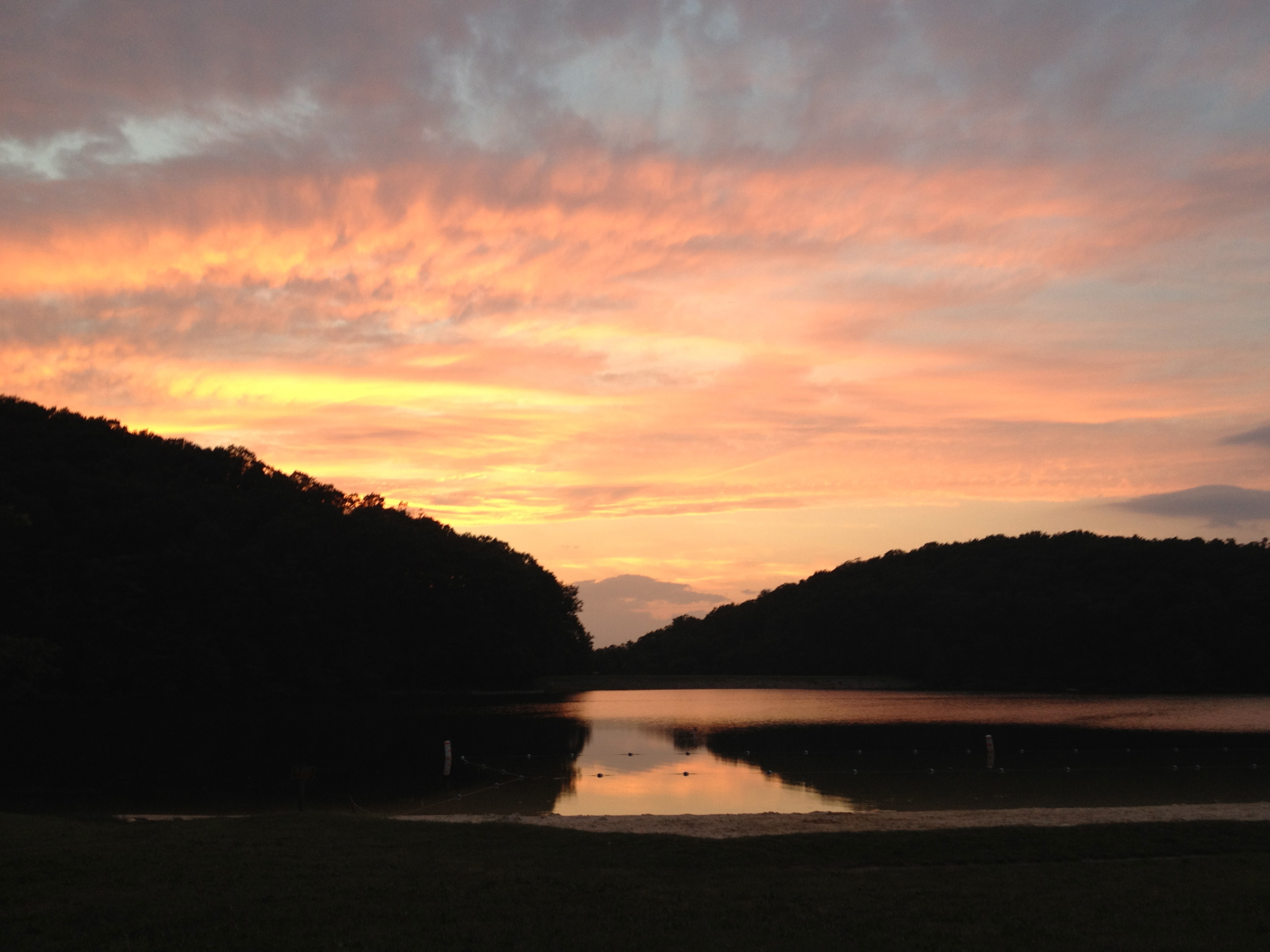
- Sunset over Greenbrier Lake

- Location within Maryland
- Location: Frederick and Washington counties, Maryland, United States
- Nearest town: Boonsboro, Maryland
- Coordinates: 39°31′48″N 77°36′36″W
- Area: 1,408 acres (570 ha)
- Elevation: 1,411 ft (430 m)
- Established: 1963
- Administrator: Maryland Department of Natural Resources
- Designation: Maryland state park
- Website: Official website

Greenbrier State Park is a Maryland state park located on South Mountain, three miles (4.8 km) northeast of Boonsboro in Washington County, Maryland, USA. The park has camping, hiking trails, and a 42-acre (17 ha) man-made lake. It is managed by the Maryland Department of Natural Resources.

== History ==
Greenbrier and Janes Island State Park were created in 1963. Between 1964 and 1978, the Maryland General Assembly authorized funding of over $2 million for land acquisition and development of Greenbrier's camping and picnic areas, beach, day-use facilities, parking areas, interpretive center, roads, and trails.

== Activities and amenities ==
The park offers camping, fishing, boat launch and rentals, swimming, hiking, picnicking, mountain biking and hunting. The park's visitor center is open year-round, its nature center seasonally.

Trails

Greenbrier State Park contains ten maintained trails: Bartman Hill Trail, Big Red Trail, Camp Loop Trail, Copperhead Trail, Green Trail, Marked Mile, Rock Oak Fire Trail, Snelling Fire Trail, Water Tank Trail, and Yellow Trail. Trail difficulties range from easy to strenuous, and lengths range from .4 miles (0.64 km) to 4.5 miles (7.2 km). All trails are open to hikers, and most are open to mountain bikes. In addition, the Appalachian Trail crosses a corner of the park and can be accessed from the Bartman Hill Trail.

Lake

Greenbrier Lake is a 42-acre, man-made lake with 1,000-foot (300 m) beach and swimming area that gradually reaches a depth of six feet. Fishing for trout, bass, or bluegill is permitted on the lake, with a state-issued license required for those 16 or older.

== In the news ==
In 1995, two rare albino deer were spotted in the park. In 2008, the park received a federal grant for $130,000 to build concrete culverts to allow box turtles to safely cross Keadle Road within the park. The pilot program was the first of its kind in the United States.
