= South Mountain (Maryland and Pennsylvania) =

Mountain in Maryland and Pennsylvania, United States

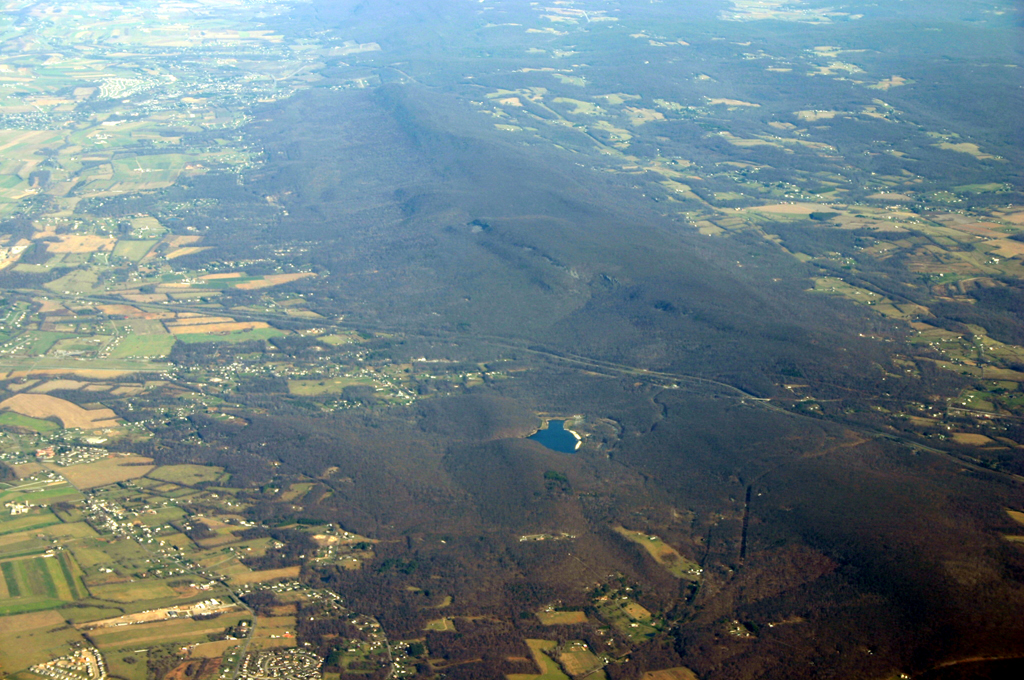
- Northward view of South Mountain near Interstate 70 in Maryland

Highest point
- Peak: Quirauk Mountain
- Elevation: 2,150 ft (660 m)
- Coordinates: 39°41′46″N 77°30′47″W

Dimensions
- Length: 70 mi (110 km)
- Width: 12 mi (19 km)

Geography
- Appalachian Mountains
- Country: United States
- States: Maryland and Pennsylvania
- Range coordinates: 39°43.2′N 77°29.5′W
- Parent range: Blue Ridge Mountains

Geology
- Orogeny: Grenville orogeny
- Rock types: Granite, gneiss and limestone

South Mountain is the northern extension of the Blue Ridge Mountain range into Maryland and Pennsylvania. From the Potomac River near Knoxville, Maryland in the south to Dillsburg, Pennsylvania in York County, Pennsylvania in the north, the 70-mile-long (110 km) range separates the Hagerstown and Cumberland valleys from the Piedmont regions of the two states.

The Appalachian Trail follows the crest of the mountain through Maryland and a portion of Pennsylvania.

== Geography ==
South Mountain begins at the Potomac River as a low, narrow ridge, barely one mile wide and only 1,200 feet (370 m) above sea level at its crest. South of the Potomac River in Virginia, the ridge continues as Short Hill Mountain for about 12 miles (19 km) before subsiding near the town of Hillsboro. South Mountain in Maryland gradually grows higher and wider towards the north. Near the Pennsylvania border, the mountain merges with the hills of the parallel Catoctin Mountain range to the east and becomes more like a low mountain range than a single crest. North of U.S. Route 30 in Pennsylvania, the South Mountain highlands reach their greatest width, over 12 miles (19 km), and several summits top 2,000 feet (610 m). The mountain then turns more to the east and becomes a series of small rocky hills between Mount Holly Springs and the northeastern end of the mountain at Dillsburg, Pennsylvania.

=== Major summits ===
==== Maryland ====
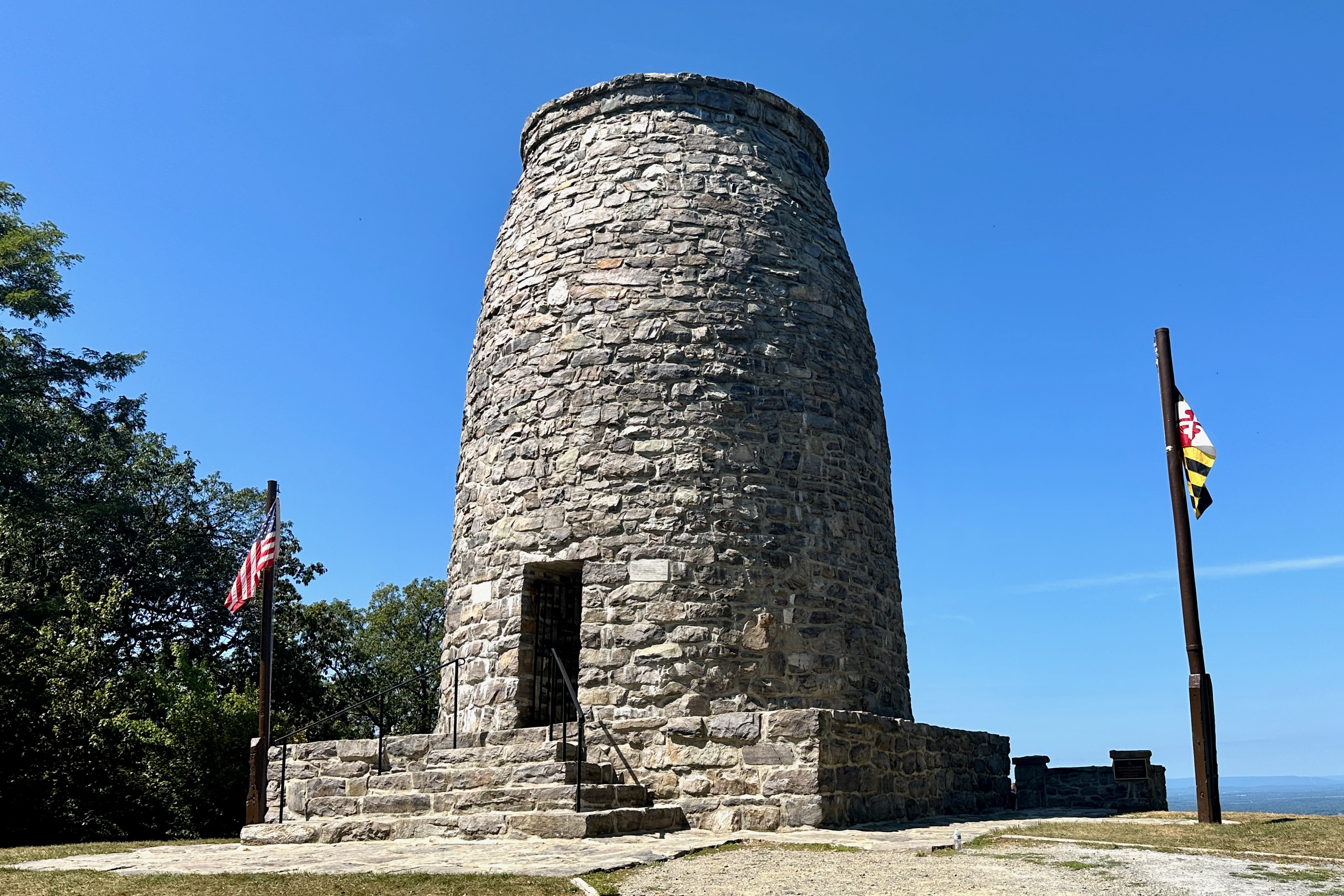
Washington Monument on Monument Knob in Maryland

From south to north:

- Lambs Knoll, 1,758 feet (536 m) above sea level
- Monument Knob, 1,540 feet (470 m)
- Bartman Hill, 1,400 feet (430 m)
- Pine Knob, 1,714 feet (522 m)
- Buzzard Knob, 1,520 feet (460 m)
- Quirauk Mountain, 2,150 feet (660 m), highest point on South Mountain in Maryland

==== Pennsylvania ====
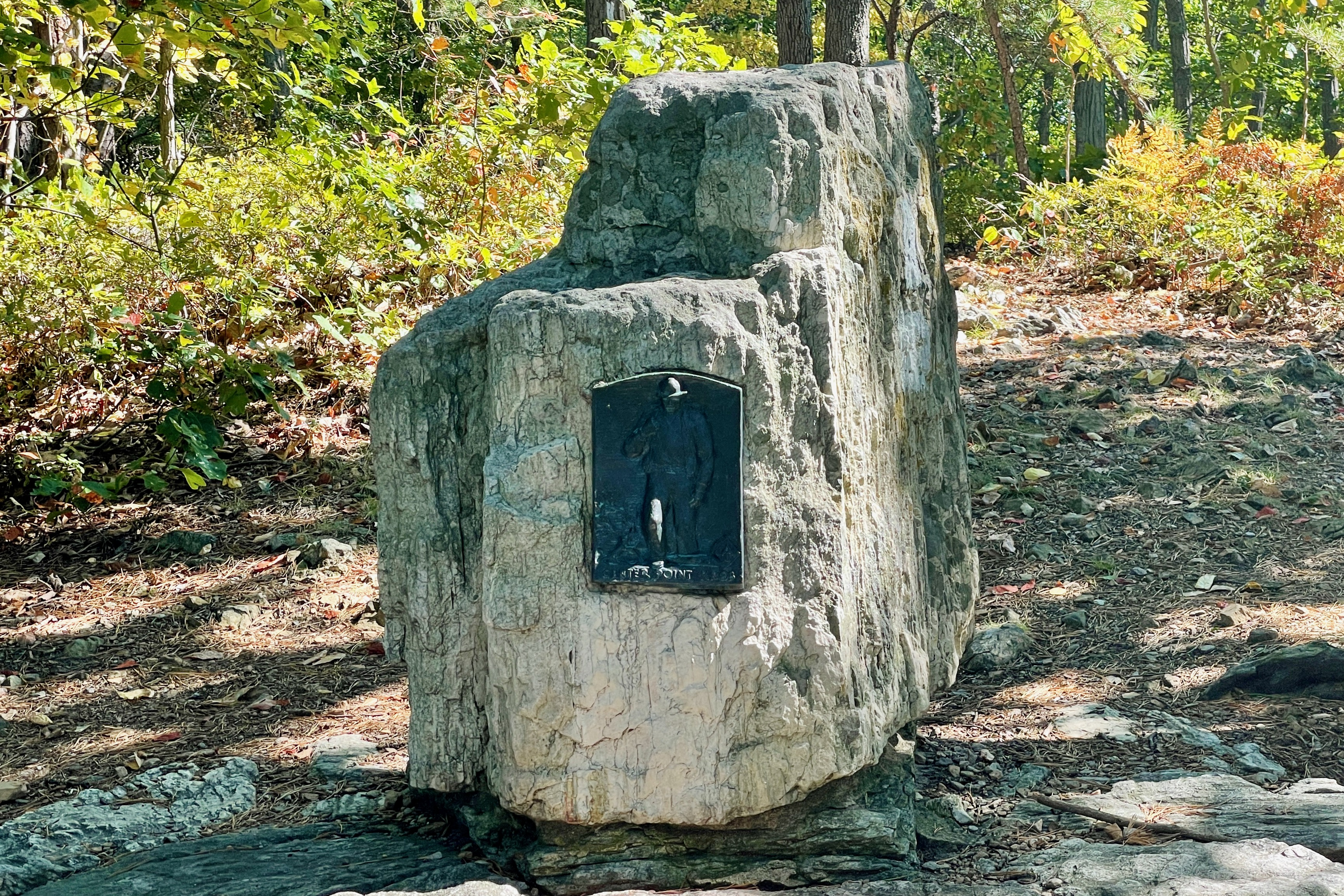
Appalachian Trail plaque on Center Point Knob in Pennsylvania

From south to north, then east:

- Mount Dunlop, 1,720 feet (520 m)
- Monterey Peak, 1,663 feet (507 m)
- Clermont Crag, 1,627 feet (496 m)
- Wildcat Rocks, 1,772 feet (540 m)
- Virginia Rock, 1,818 feet (554 m)
- Buzzard Peak/Chimney Rocks, 1,946 feet (593 m)
- Snowy Mountain, 2,090 feet (640 m)
- Green Ridge, 1,980 feet (600 m)
- Mount Newman, 1,784 feet (544 m)
- Piney Mountain, 1,904 feet (580 m)
- Big Pine Flat Ridge, 2,100 feet (640 m), highest point on South Mountain in Pennsylvania
- Big Flat Ridge, 2,065 feet (629 m)
- East Big Flat Ridge, 2,070 feet (630 m)
- Mount Holly, 1,504 feet (458 m)
- Long Mountain, 1,583 feet (482 m)
- Center Point Knob, 1,075 feet (328 m), midpoint of the Appalachian Trail in 1935
- White Rocks, 1,105 feet (337 m)

=== Gaps ===
==== Maryland ====
From south to north:

- Crampton's Gap, 930 feet (280 m), between Burkittsville and Gapland
- Fox's Gap, 1,070 feet (330 m), between Middletown and Boonsboro
- Harman Gap (Oeiler's Gap), 1,570 feet (480 m), east of Cavetown
- Turner's Gap, 1,071 feet (326 m), between Middletown and Boonsboro, traversed by U.S. Route 40 Alternate

==== Pennsylvania ====
From south to north:

- Monterey Gap, 1,330 feet (410 m), at Blue Ridge Summit (see also Fairfield Gap)
- Pass near Mount Newman, 1,380 feet (420 m), traversed by U.S. Route 30

=== State reservations ===
==== Maryland ====
From south to north:

- South Mountain State Park, length of the ridge crest in Maryland
- Gathland State Park, Crampton Gap
- Washington Monument State Park, near Boonsboro
- Greenbrier State Park, near Boonsboro

==== Pennsylvania ====
From south to north:

- Michaux State Forest, covering most of the mountain
- Caledonia State Park, east of Fayetteville
- Kings Gap State Park
- Pine Grove Furnace State Park, current midpoint of the Appalachian Trail

== Conservation ==
In Pennsylvania, the region surrounding is the focus of a Conservation Landscape Initiative, led by the Pennsylvania Department of Conservation and Natural Resources (DCNR) and the Appalachian Trail Conservancy. The initiative is organized as South Mountain Partnership, which involves other organizations, government, business, and community members.

== History ==
The history of South Mountain defines the early history of western Maryland. It was viewed as a boundary to the Susquehannock (Conestoga) in their original treaty granting land to Maryland. In a 1732 letter to the colonial governor of Maryland, Togotolisa, (Captain Civility), chief of the Susquehannock people, warns against settlement in the valley beyond the mountain. The first Euromerican land grant west of South Mountain by Maryland was William Park's "Park Hall" in 1731 near Crampton's Gap. The earliest route of the Great Wagon Road crossed South Mountain by Fox's Gap on a course between Middletown and Sharpsburg. Other important passes for migration and settlement were Turner's Gap near Boonsboro; Orr's Gap, used today by Interstate 70; and the course of "Cartledge's Old Road" generally following Maryland state route 77. Maryland finally gained clear title to the lands west of South Mountain in the 1744 Treaty of Lancaster.

Following John Brown's Raid on Harpers Ferry in 1859, seven of the raiders escaped from their Kennedy Farm headquarters to Pennsylvania by following Elk ridge and South Mountain north. The escapees traveled by night and spent the days in cold camps among the densest thickets they could find along the remote ridge top. They finally left the mountain near today's Caledonia State Park between Chambersburg and Gettysburg, Pennsylvania.

The Battle of South Mountain was fought on the mountain at Crampton's, Fox's, and Turner's gaps during Robert E. Lee's invasion of Maryland in the Civil War in 1862. In 1863, military engagements on the mountain range during Lee's invasion of Pennsylvania included the Fight at Monterey Pass near the Mason–Dixon line.

== See also ==
- List of subranges of the Appalachian Mountains
