= Crampton's Gap Historic District =

Historic district in Maryland, United States

- U.S. National Register of Historic Places
- U.S. Historic district
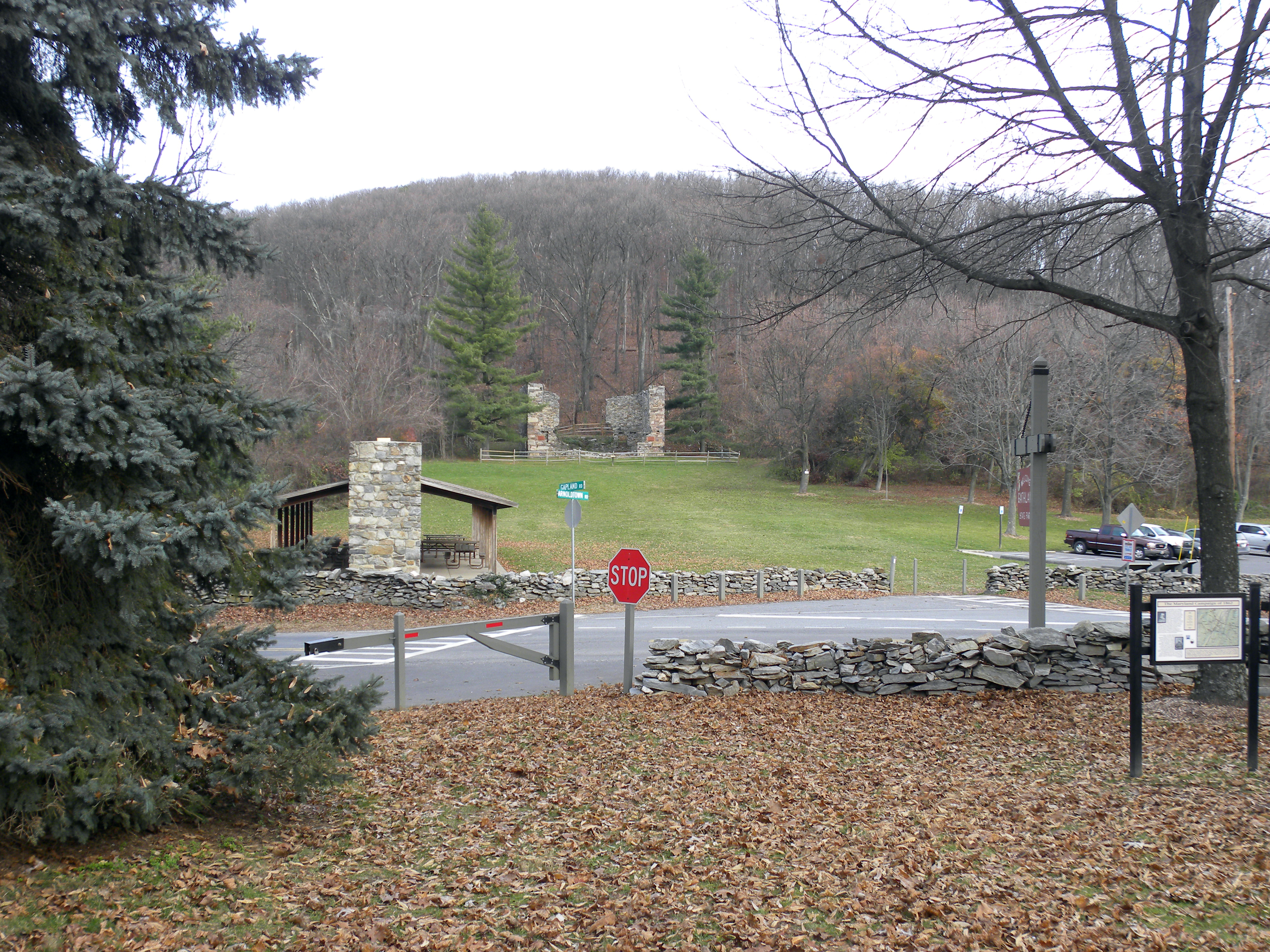
- Crampton's Gap at Gathland State Park

- Location within Maryland Location within the United States
- Location: Burkittsville, Maryland
- Coordinates: 39°24′20.2″N 77°38′22.8″W
- Area: 3,494 acres (1,414 ha)
- MPS: South Mountain Battlefields MPS
- NRHP reference No.: 10000576
- Added to NRHP: January 12, 2011

The Crampton's Gap Historic District comprises the battlefield where the American Civil War Battle of Crampton's Gap, part of the larger Battle of South Mountain, took place on September 14, 1862. The district extends on the west to the foot of South Mountain, and to the east of Burkittsville, beyond the eastern foot of the mountain. The district is characterized by steep mountain terrain in the west and open farmland in the east, with the small town of Burkittsville in the center, which is itself listed as a historic district on the National Register of Historic Places. The district extends to the south to include Brownsville Gap. The district includes 98 contributing buildings, 78 of which are in the Burkittsville Historic District. Crampton's Gap at the crest of the mountain is encompassed by Gathland State Park, which features the War Correspondents Memorial Arch, erected in 1896 to memorialize journalists killed in wartime. The arch is listed on the National Register as part of Antietam National Battlefield. The mountainous portions of the district feature numerous stone walls, which were used by both sides for shelter against gunfire during the battle.

The district was placed on the National Register of Historic Places on January 12, 2011.

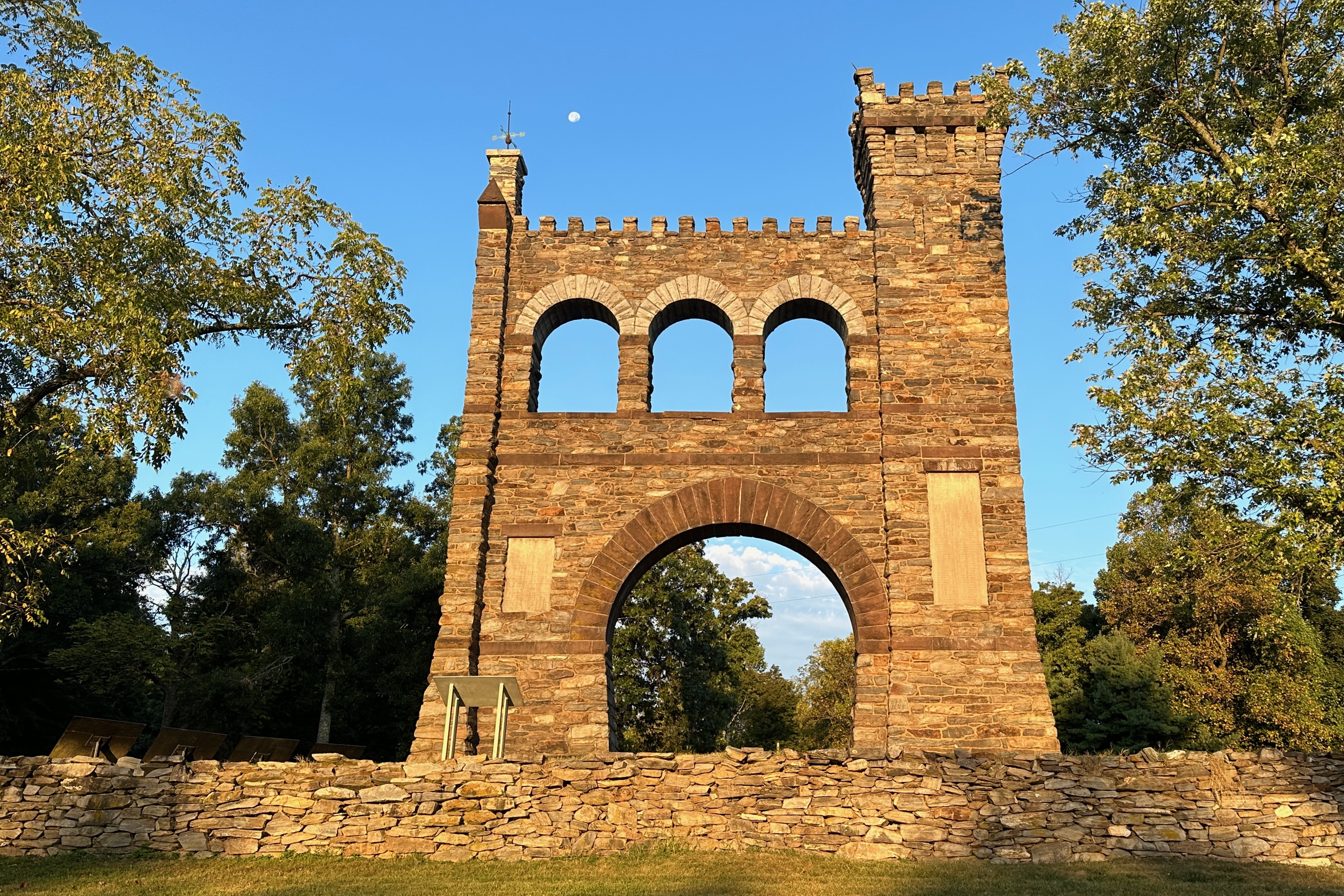
War Correspondents Memorial Arch

== See also ==
- Turner's and Fox's Gaps Historic District, which includes the northern extent of the Battle of South Mountain
