= George Alfred Townsend =

American journalist and novelist (1841–1914)

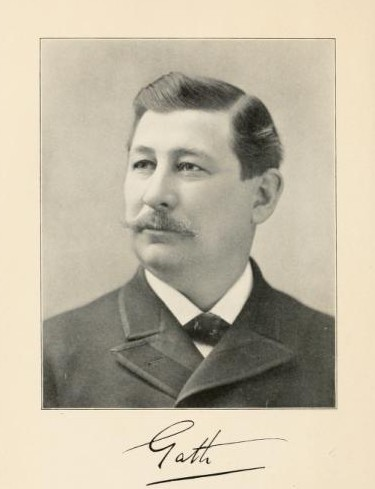
- George Alfred Townsend, ca. 1899
- Born: January 30, 1841; Georgetown, Delaware, U.S.
- Died: April 15, 1914 (aged 73); Manhattan, New York, U.S.
- Resting place: Laurel Hill Cemetery, Philadelphia, Pennsylvania, U.S.
- Occupations: journalist, novelist
- Spouse: Elizabeth Evans Rhodes (m. 1865)
- Children: 2

George Alfred Townsend (January 30, 1841 – April 15, 1914) was an American journalist and novelist who worked under the pen name Gath. He was one of the youngest war correspondents during the American Civil War. Over the course of his career he worked for multiple newspapers including the Philadelphia Inquirer, Philadelphia Press, New York Herald, New York World and Chicago Tribune. He became well known as Washington D.C. correspondent for the New York World and his coverage of the assassination of Abraham Lincoln. He turned his daily reports into a book, The Life, Crime, and Capture of John Wilkes Booth, published in 1865. In 1871, he established and edited the Washington D.C. newspaper the Capital along with Donn Piatt, but left the venture soon after its creation.

He built an estate on South Mountain near Burkittsville, Maryland, and named it Gapland. He built the National War Correspondents Memorial on his estate to recognize journalists who died in war. After his death, his estate was purchased by the State of Maryland and became Gathland State Park.

== Early life and education ==
Townsend was born in Georgetown, Delaware, on January 30, 1841, to Stephen Townsend and Mary Milbourne. His father was a circuit preacher and the family moved often. He lived in various towns in Delaware and Maryland's Eastern Shore including, Snow Hill, Cambridge and Princess Anne. In Chestertown, Maryland, he attended a school sponsored by Washington College. In Newark, Delaware, at the age of 10, he attended Newark Academy which became the University of Delaware. The family moved to Philadelphia around 1854 and established a more permanent residence. He attended Central High School and graduated with a Masters in Arts degree in 1860.

== Career ==
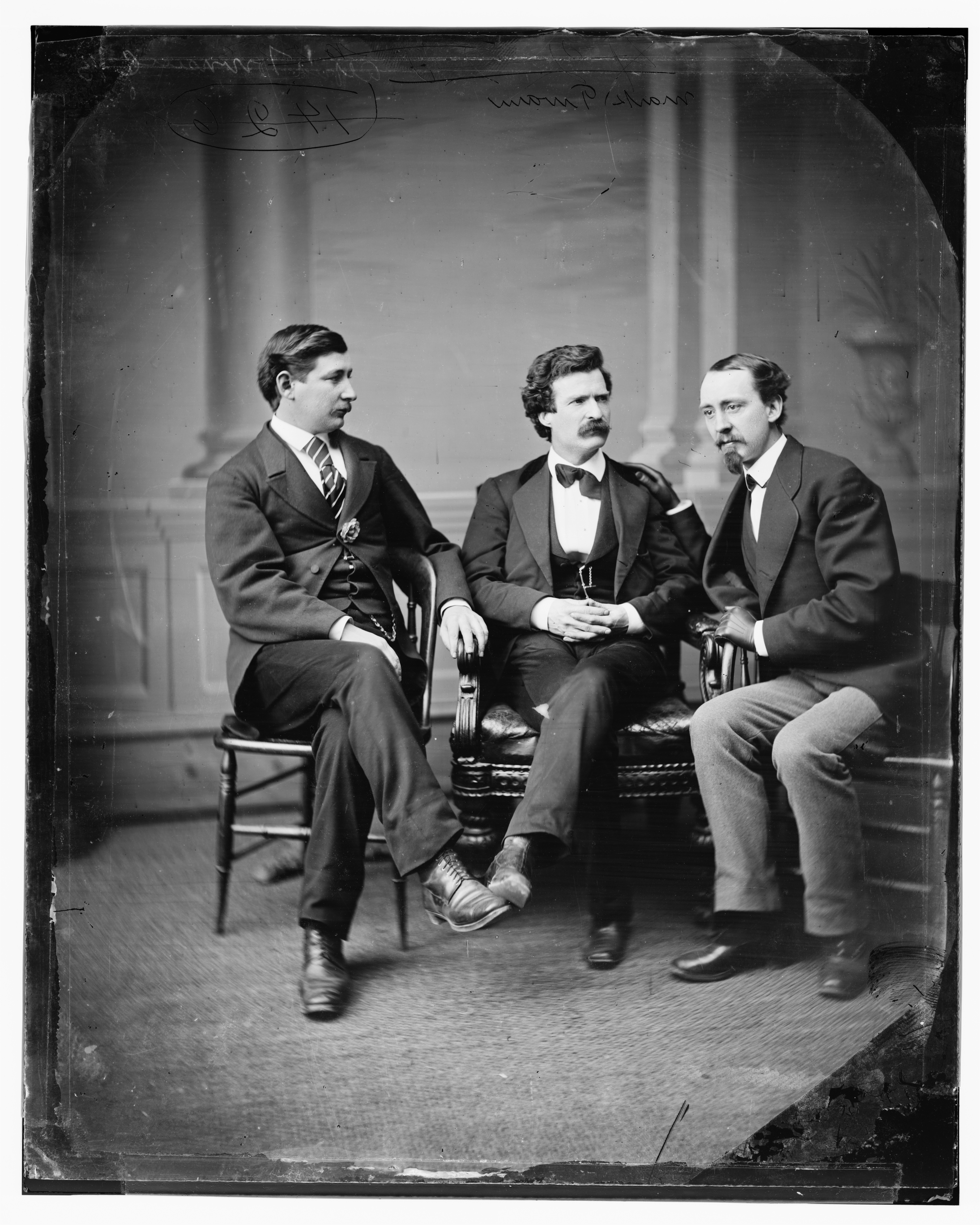
Townsend (left) photographed with Mark Twain (middle) and David Gray in 1871

In 1860, after graduating from Central High School, he joined The Philadelphia Inquirer and worked as news editor, editorial writer and reporter. In 1861 he moved to the Philadelphia Press and worked as city editor and drama critic. Aside from newspaper work, he wrote poetry and a play, The Bohemians. In 1862, the New York Herald hired him to work as a war correspondent. He was one of the youngest war correspondents to cover the American Civil War. He travelled with the Army of the Potomac under the command of George McClellan during the Peninsula Campaign. He was with the Army of the Potomac during the failed attack on Richmond, Virginia. He was reassigned to John Pope but fell ill before the Second Battle of Bull Run with malaria. He left covering the war to recover his health and traveled throughout Europe. In England he held a successful lecture tour titled "The Civil War in America" where he told tales of his experiences reporting on the Civil War and some of the political and social causes of the war. He traveled in Italy and became interested in Giuseppe Garibaldi, the leader of the Italian unification movement. Townsend published a pamphlet on Girabaldi to be sold back in the United States.

In 1865, Townsend returned to working as a war correspondent and reported from the Union Army headquarters in City Point, Virginia, and camps near Petersburg, Virginia. His interview of Philip Sheridan just after the victory at the Battle of Five Forks helped launch his career. He was Washington correspondent for the New York World, covering the assassination of Abraham Lincoln and its aftermath. His daily reports filed between April 17 – May 17 were published later in 1865 as a book, The Life, Crime, and Capture of John Wilkes Booth.

In December 1865, he married Elizabeth Evans Rhodes of Philadelphia. They traveled throughout Europe after the wedding and their first child, Genevieve Madeleine was born in October 1866, in Paris. In 1867, he moved to Washington D.C. and began writing under the pen name "Gath", which was derived by adding an "H" to his initials, and inspired by the biblical passage II Samuel 1:20, "Tell it not in Gath, publish it not in the streets of Askalon, lest the daughters of the Philistines rejoice." He wrote under other pen names including Johnny Bouquet, Finn, Laertes, and Swede. By 1868, he had become one of the most quotable Washington correspondents, working for the "Chicago Tribune," and, after 1874, for the "New York Graphic." His letters, published several times a week, were several columns long, and included lively word-portraits of politicians and opinion. He established and edited, with Ohio journalist and politician, Donn Piatt, the Capital in Washington, D.C., in 1871, but parted company with Piatt soon after.

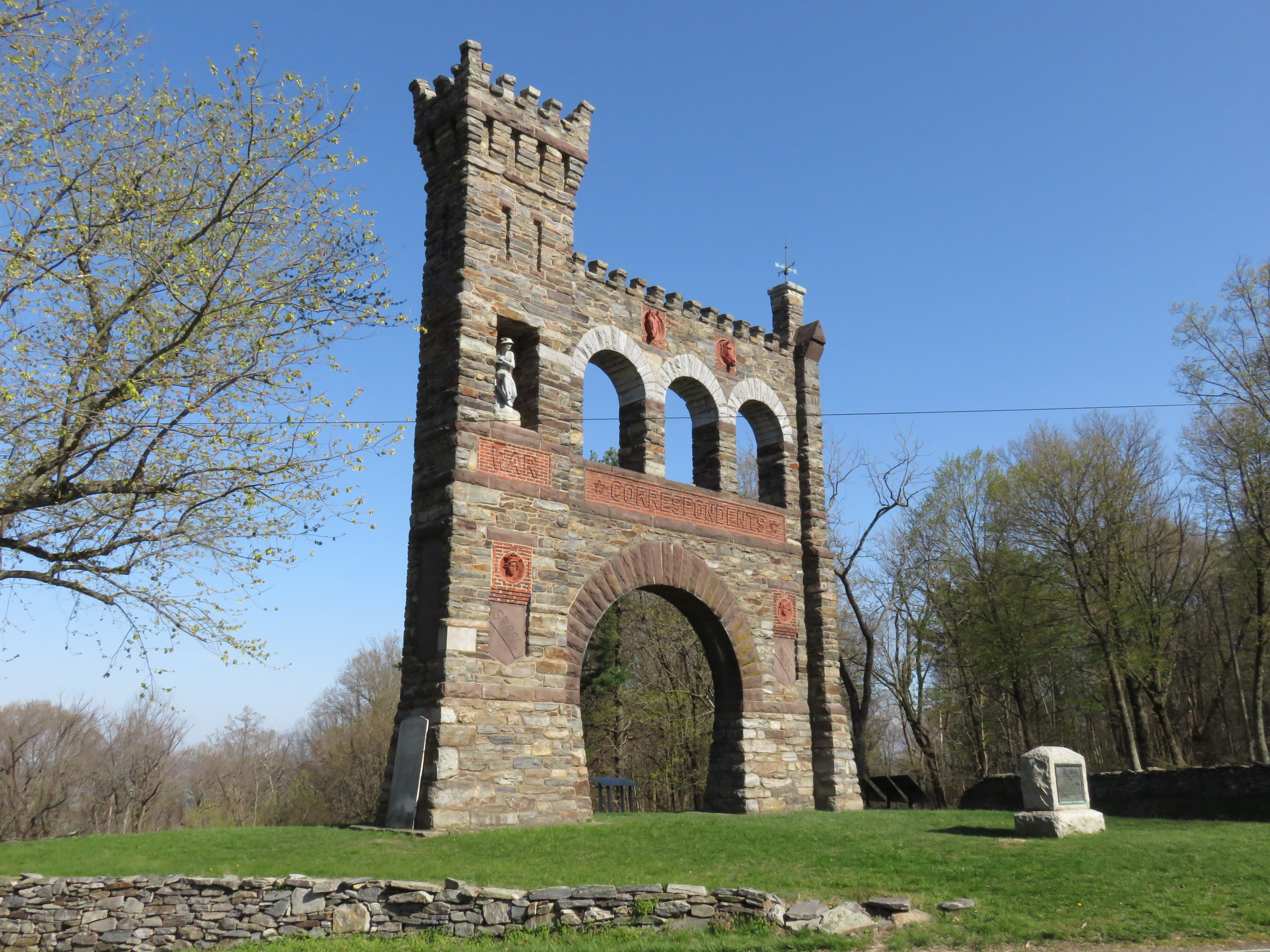
The National War Correspondents Memorial in Gathland State Park

In 1884 Townsend traveled to Western Maryland to research locations for a romance novel based during the Civil War. He purchased 100 acres of land and built a baronial estate in the Catoctin Mountains called "Gapland," near Burkittsville, Maryland. Gapland was built on the site of the Battle of Crampton's Gap, and is in close proximity to the battlefields of South Mountain and Antietam. The estate was composed of several buildings, including Gapland Hall, Gapland Lodge, the Den and Library Building, and a mausoleum inscribed with "Good Night, Gath" that was never used. In 1896, Townsend built the War Correspondents' Memorial Arch, the first such monument tribute to war journalists.

His novels included The Entailed Hat (1884), which fictionalized a true story of a woman named Patty Cannon who kidnapped free blacks and sold them into slavery. Townsend's other works include the short story collection Tales of the Chesapeake (1880) and the novel Katy of Catoctin (1887).

His style of writing fell out of favor and he struggled to maintain the income required for his lifestyle. After the death of his wife Bessie in 1903, he became reclusive. He left Gapland in 1911, and moved to New York City to live with his daughter and son-in-law. He died in 1914 and was interred at Laurel Hill Cemetery in Philadelphia.

His estate was abandoned after his death. In 1949, the State of Maryland purchased the property and established Gathland State Park.

== Publications ==
- The Life and Battles of Garibaldi, and His March on Rome in 1867., New York: American News Company, 1867
- The Entailed Hat or Patty Cannon's Times - a Romance, New York: Harper & Brothers, 1884
- Lost Abroad, Hartford, CT: S.M. Betts & Company, 1872
- Poems, Washington, D.C.: Rhodes and Ralph, 1873
- Washington, Outside and Inside. A Picture and a Narrative of the Origin, Growth, Excellences, Abuses, Beauties, and Personages of Our Governing City., Hartford, CT: James Betts & Co., 1873
- Katy of Catoctin or The Chain-Breakers - A National Romance, New York: D. Appleton and Company, 1890
- Poems of Men and Events, New York: E.F. Bonaventure, 1899
