= Turner's and Fox's Gaps Historic District =

Historic district in Maryland, United States

- U.S. National Register of Historic Places
- U.S. Historic district
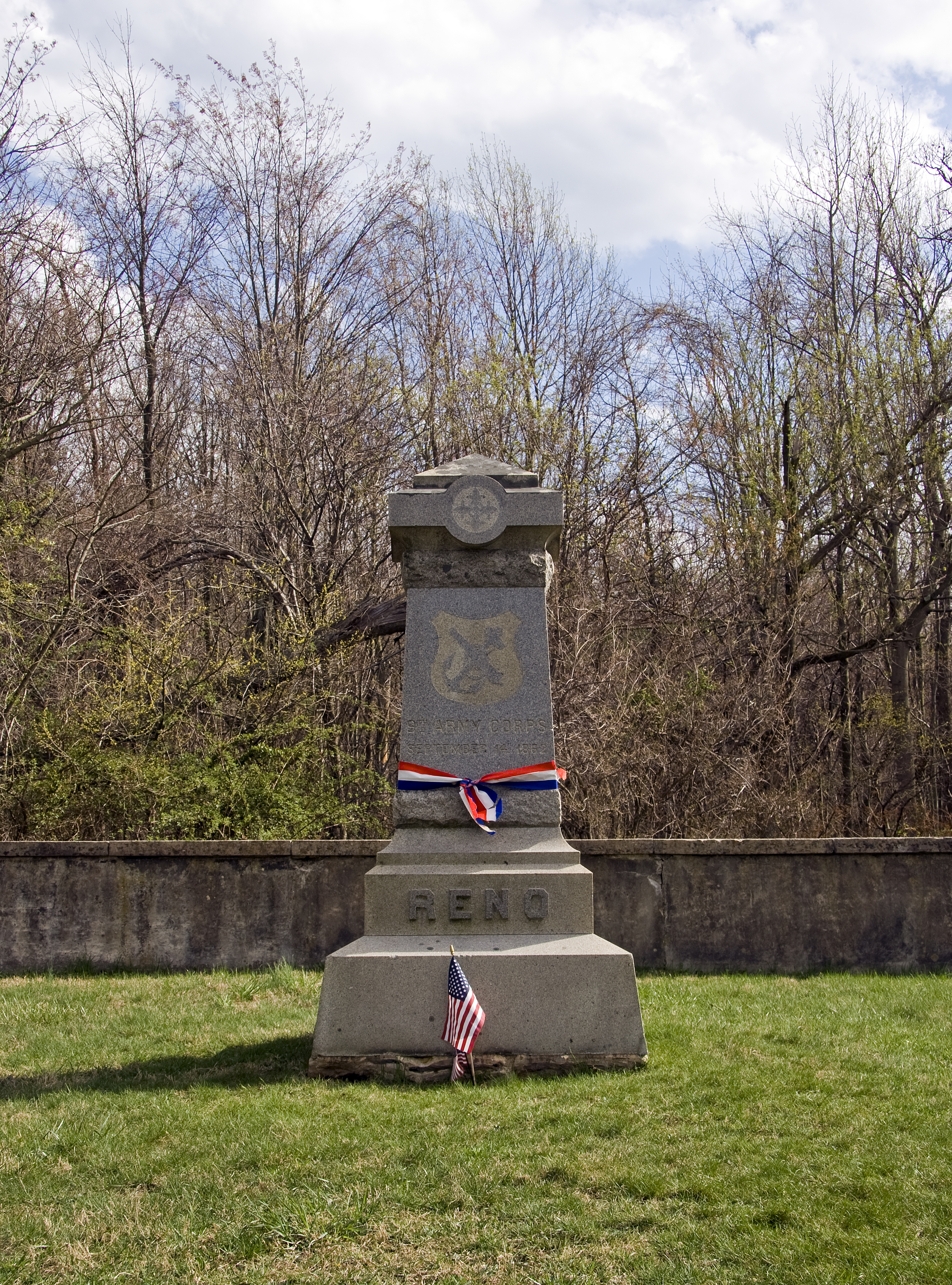
- Reno Monument at Fox Gap

- Location within Maryland Location within the United States
- Location: Reno Monument Road, Middletown, Maryland, Boonsboro, Maryland
- Coordinates: 39°29′04.8″N 77°37′12.75″W
- Area: 2,397 acres (970 ha)
- MPS: South Mountain Battlefields MPS
- NRHP reference No.: 10000575
- Added to NRHP: January 12, 2011

The Turner's and Fox's Gaps Historic District comprises the Civil War-era battlefield involved in the Battle of South Mountain, which took place on September 14, 1862. The district extends on the west to the slopes of South Mountain in the area of Zittlestown, and to the east beyond the foot of the mountain to the small community of Bolivar. The district is characterized by steep mountain terrain in the west and open farmland in the east, with Turner's Gap to the north and Fox's Gap to the south. The district includes 115 contributing buildings and structures. The most significant contributing buildings are the Mountain House Inn (now the Old South Mountain Inn) and the White House Inn, or Beachley House. Also included in the list is the Reno Monument at Fox's Gap, shown at right. The Old National Pike, now known as U.S. 40 Alternate, passes over South Mountain at Turner's Gap.

The district was placed on the National Register of Historic Places on January 12, 2011.

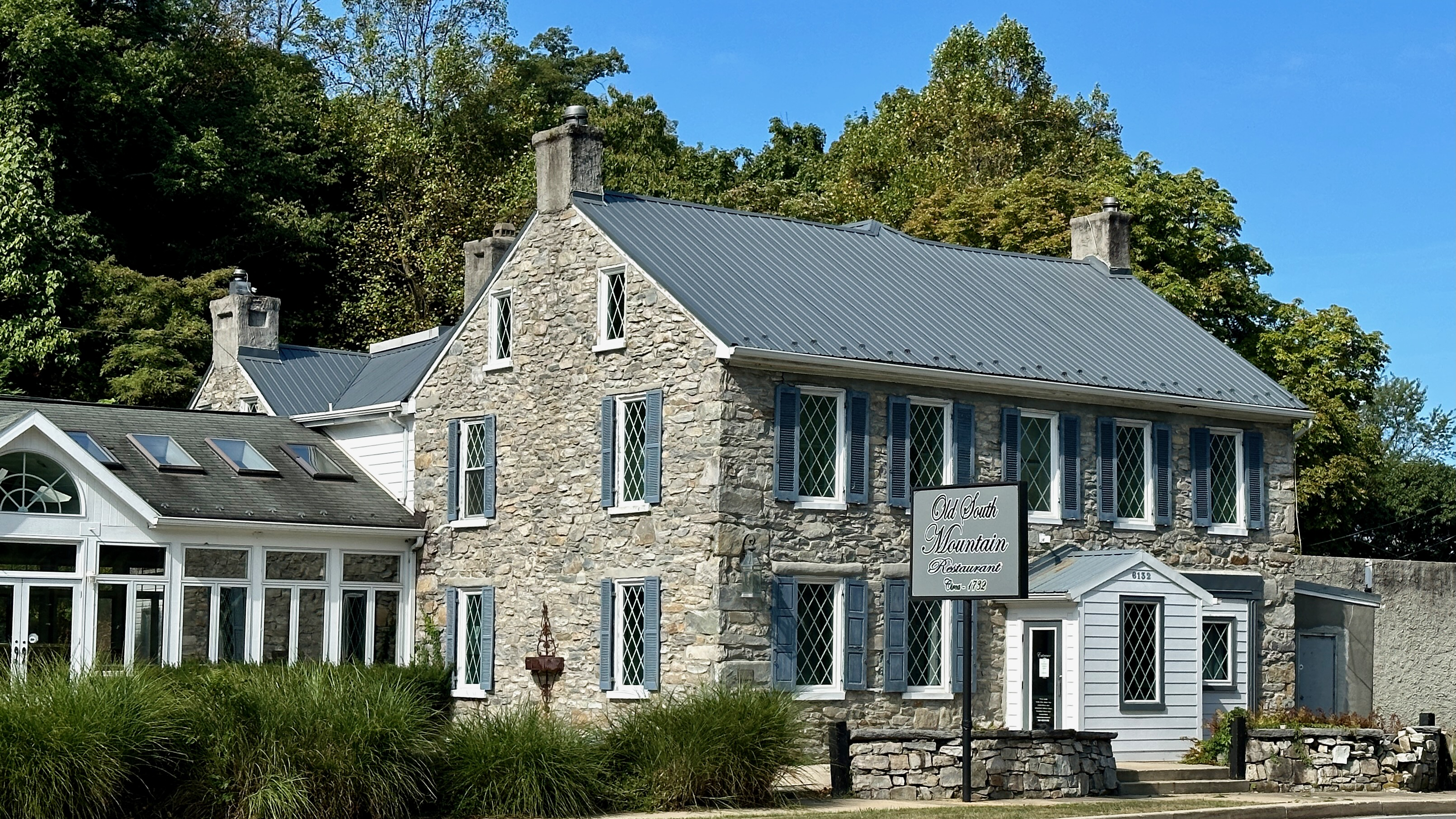
Old South Mountain Inn at Turner's Gap

== See also ==
- Crampton's Gap Historic District comprises the southern extent of the Battle of South Mountain, also known as the Battle of Crampton's Gap.
- Dahlgren Chapel, at the summit of Turner's Gap, listed as a non-contributing building due to its post-Civil War construction
- Washington Monument State Park is located nearby, but not included in the district
