= General Chilton =

General Chilton may refer to:

- Kevin P. Chilton (born 1954), U.S. Air Force four-star general
- Maurice Chilton (1898–1956), British Army lieutenant general
- Robert H. Chilton (1815–1879), Confederate States Army brigadier general
