= Elizabeth Neuffer =

American journalist (1956–2003)

- Born: June 15, 1956; Wilton, Connecticut, U.S.
- Died: May 9, 2003 (aged 46) near Samarra, Iraq

Elizabeth Neuffer (June 15, 1956 – May 9, 2003) was an American journalist who specialized in covering war crimes, human rights abuses, and post-conflict societies. She died at the age of 46 in a car accident while covering the Iraq War.

== Career ==
Neuffer began her career with The Boston Globe in the Washington bureau, where she covered Capitol Hill and the Clinton Administration's plan for health care reform. She also reported from Moscow on the breakup of the Soviet Union, and from Saudi Arabia, Kuwait, and Iraq during the Gulf War.

She served as the European Bureau Chief from 1994 to 1998 in Berlin. During that time, she covered both the war in Bosnia and its subsequent peace, including the 1994 Sarajevo marketplace massacre, the fall of the UN “safe haven” Srebrenica, the arrival of American troops, and elections in postwar Bosnia. In addition to general coverage of the European continent – from the rise of the far-right in France to economic turmoil in Romania – she reported on civil unrest in Albania, violence in Kosovo, and was dispatched to Africa to report on the 1996 return of Hutu refugees from Zaire to their native Rwanda.

The first reporter to reveal that indicted war criminals remained in power in post-war Bosnia, Neuffer dedicated almost a year to exclusively reporting about war crimes in Bosnia and Rwanda. That reporting earned her several awards, including the Johns Hopkins School of Advanced International Studies Award for Excellence in International Journalism. She was also awarded the Edward R. Murrow Fellowship at the Council on Foreign Relations in New York City, where she worked on a project about war crimes while on leave from The Boston Globe.

In 1998 Neuffer won a Courage in Journalism Award from the International Women's Media Foundation (IWMF).

She was the author of The Key to My Neighbor's House: Seeking Justice in Bosnia and Rwanda, published by Picador in 2001.

== Death and legacy ==
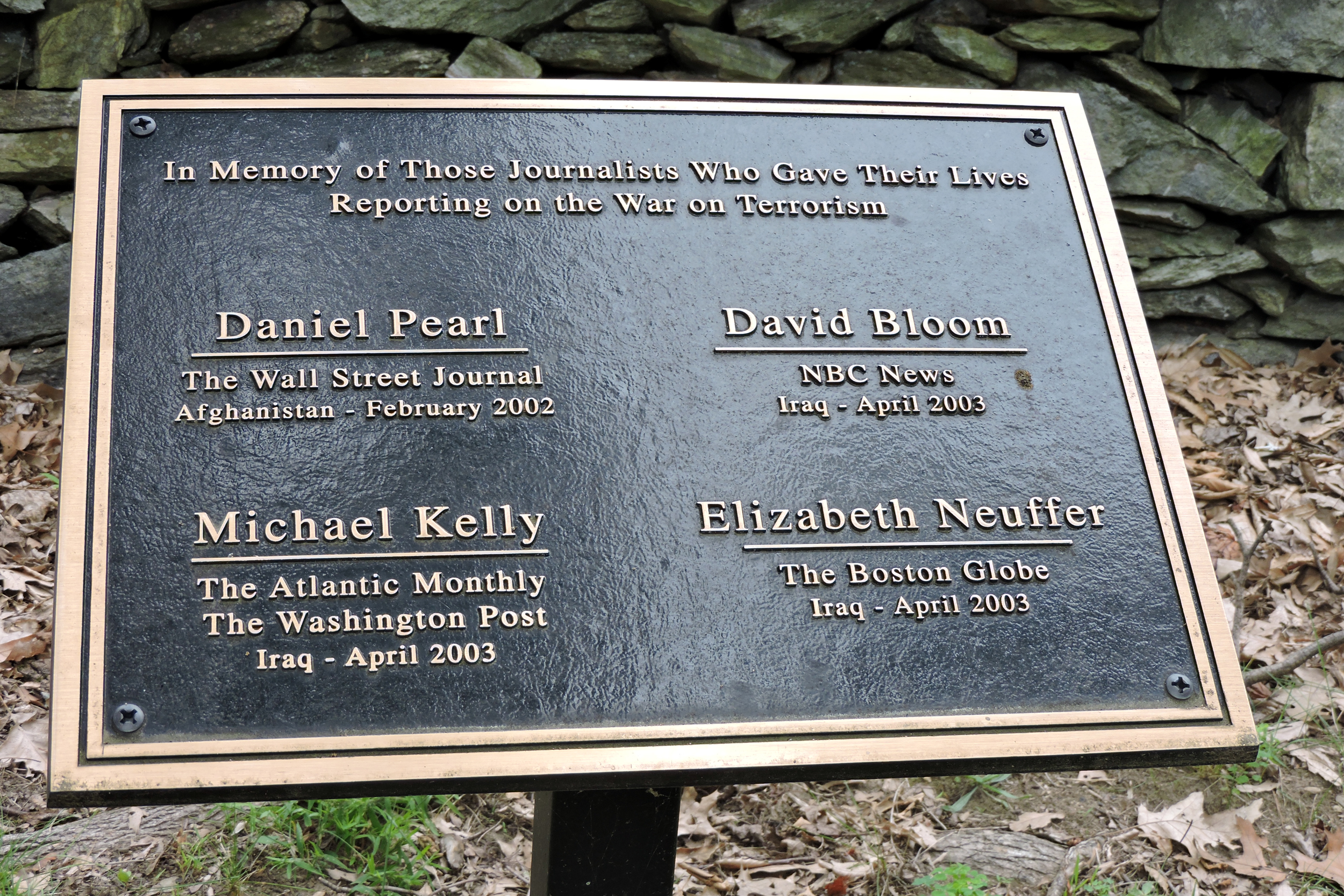
Plaque at National War Correspondents Memorial, Gathland State Park

On May 9, 2003, she was killed in a car accident while returning to Baghdad from an overnight trip to Tikrit where she covered the aftermath of the war.

In 2005, the International Women's Media Foundation collaborated with Neuffer's family and friends to start the Elizabeth Neuffer Fellowship. This program to honor Neuffer's legacy while advancing her work in the fields of human rights and social justice. The fellows complete research and coursework at MIT's Center for International Studies and journalism internships at The Boston Globe and The New York Times.
