= Battle of South Mountain =

Battle of the American Civil War

Battle of South Mountain (Battle of Boonsboro Gap)
- Part of the American Civil War
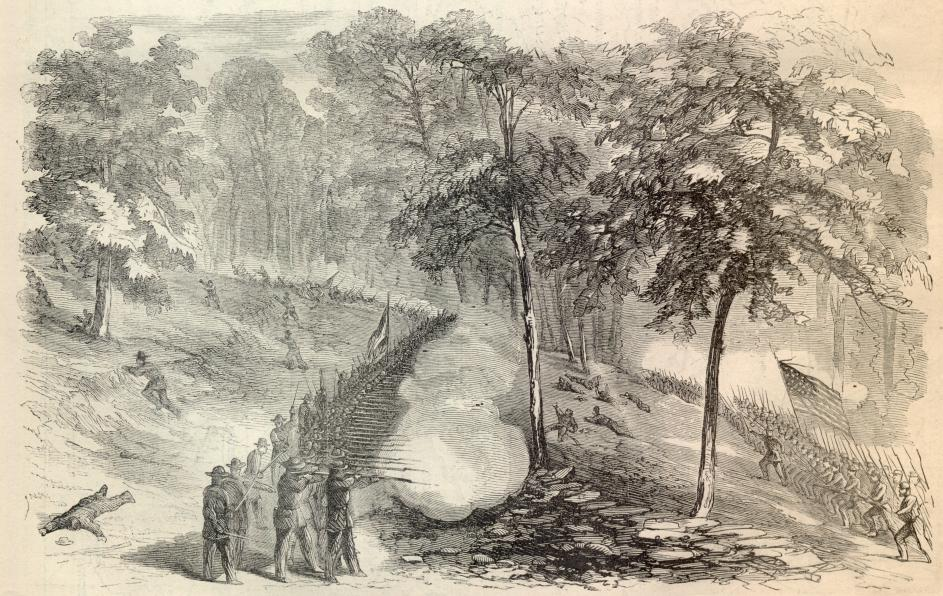
- Union Corps under General Franklin attacking Confederate troops at Crampton's gap. Harper's Weekly, October 25, 1862.
Date	September 14, 1862
Location	Frederick County and Washington County, near Boonsboro, Maryland 39°29′06″N 77°37′18″W
Result	Union victory

Belligerents
United States	Confederate States

Commanders and leaders
(United States) George B. McClellan (United States) Ambrose Burnside (United States) William B. Franklin	Robert E. Lee; D. H. Hill

Strength
28,000	18,000

Casualties and losses
2,325 total (443 killed, 1,807 wounded, 75 missing)	2,685 total (325 killed, 1,560 wounded, 800 missing)

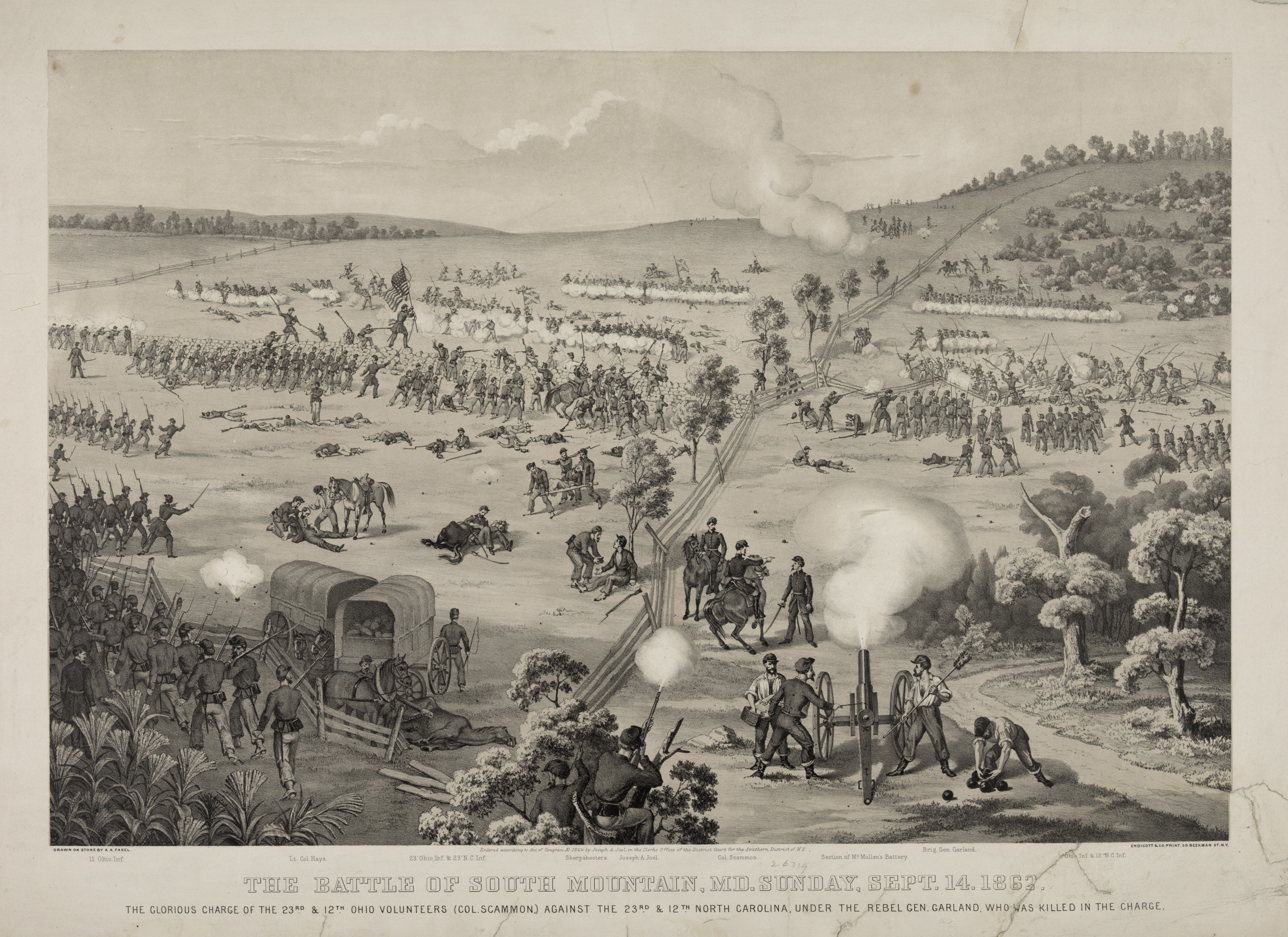
Fox's Gap at the battle of South Mountain, MD. Sunday, Sept. 14, 1862

The Battle of South Mountain, known in several early Southern accounts as the Battle of Boonsboro Gap, was fought on September 14, 1862, as part of the Maryland campaign of the American Civil War. Three pitched battles were fought for possession of three South Mountain passes: Crampton's, Turner's, and Fox's Gaps.

Maj. Gen. George B. McClellan, commanding the Union Army of the Potomac, needed to pass through these gaps in his pursuit of Confederate General Robert E. Lee's precariously divided Army of Northern Virginia.

Although the delay bought at South Mountain would allow him to reunite his army and forestall defeat in detail, Lee considered termination of the Maryland Campaign at nightfall.

== Background ==
South Mountain is the name given to the continuation of the Blue Ridge Mountains after they enter Maryland. It is a natural obstacle that separates the Hagerstown Valley and Cumberland Valley from the eastern part of Maryland.

After Lee invaded Maryland, a copy of an order, known as Special Order 191, detailing troop movements that he wrote fell into the hands of McClellan. From this, McClellan learned that Lee had split his forces, sending one wing under Maj. Gen. Thomas J. Jackson to lay siege to Harper's Ferry. The rest of Lee's army was posted at Boonsboro under command of Maj. Gen. James Longstreet. Lee hoped that after taking Harper's Ferry to secure his rear, he could carry out an invasion of the Union, wrecking the Monocacy aqueduct, before turning his attention to Baltimore, Philadelphia, or Washington, D.C.

To counter the Confederate invasion, McClellan led the Army of the Potomac west in an effort to force battle on the isolated parts of Lee's divided force.

McClellan temporarily organized his army into three wings for the attacks on the passes. Maj. Gen. Ambrose Burnside, the Right Wing, commanded the I Corps (Maj. Gen. Joseph Hooker) and IX Corps (Maj. Gen. Jesse L. Reno). The Right Wing was sent to Turner's Gap and Fox's Gap in the north. The Left Wing, commanded by Maj. Gen. William B. Franklin, consisting of his own VI Corps and Maj. Gen. Darius N. Couch's division of the IV Corps, was sent to Crampton's Gap in the south. The Center Wing (II Corps and XII Corps), under Maj. Gen. Edwin Vose Sumner, was in reserve.

From Boonsboro, Lee had sent a column under Maj. Gen. James Longstreet northward to respond to a perceived threat from Pennsylvania. After learning of McClellan's intelligence coup, Lee quickly recalled Longstreet's forces to reinforce the South Mountain passes and thus attempt to block McClellan's advance. On the day of the battle, the only Confederate force posted around Boonsboro was a five-brigade division under Maj. Gen. D.H. Hill.

== Battles ==
=== Crampton's Gap ===
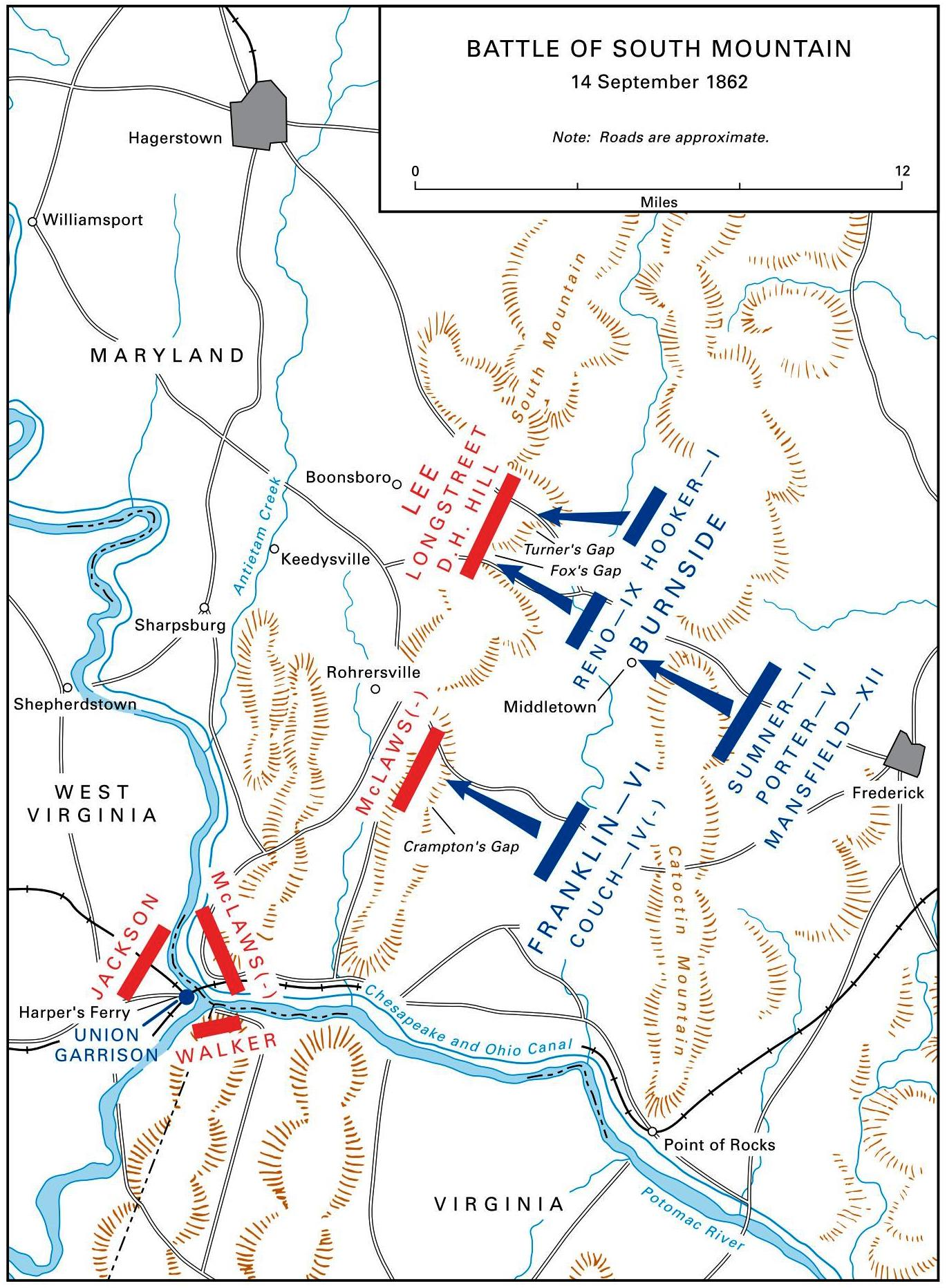
Maryland Campaign: Battle of South Mountain, September 14, 1862

At the southernmost point of the battle, near Burkittsville, Confederate cavalry and a small portion of Maj. Gen. Lafayette McLaws's division defended Brownsville Pass and Crampton's Gap. McLaws was unaware of the approach of 12,000 Federals and had only 500 men under Col. William A. Parham thinly deployed behind a three-quarter-mile-long stone wall at the eastern base of Crampton's Gap. Franklin spent three hours deploying his forces. A Confederate later wrote of a "lion making exceedingly careful preparations to spring on a plucky little mouse."

Franklin deployed the division of Maj. Gen. Henry Warner Slocum on the right and Maj. Gen. William F. "Baldy" Smith on the left. They seized the gap and captured 400 prisoners, mostly men who were arriving as late reinforcements from Brig. Gen. Howell Cobb's brigade.

=== Turner's Gap ===
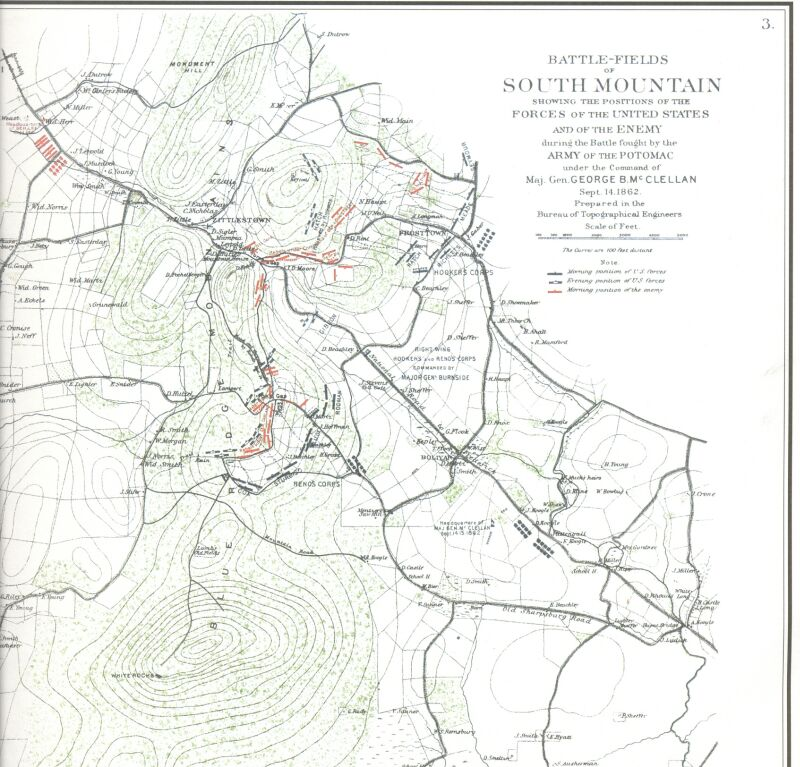
Northern field of battle

Confederate Maj. Gen. D. H. Hill, deploying 5,000 men over more than 2 miles, defended both Turner's Gap and Fox's Gap. Burnside sent Hooker's I Corps to the right and Turner's Gap. The Union Iron Brigade attacked Colonel Alfred H. Colquitt's brigade along the National Road, driving it back up the mountain, but it refused to yield the pass. Hooker positioned three divisions opposite two peaks located one mile north of the gap. The Alabama Brigade of Brig. Gen. Robert E. Rodes was forced to withdraw because of his isolated position, despite the arrival of reinforcements from Brig. Gen. David R. Jones's division and Brig. Gen. Nathan G. Evans's brigade.

Darkness and the difficult terrain prevented the complete collapse of Lee's line. At nightfall, the Federals held the high ground while the Confederates still held the gap.

In the 1890s, the United States War Department placed six markers at the summit of Turner’s Pass, also known as Turner’s Gap, across from the Old South Mountain Inn. They are on the north side of Alternate U.S. 40, the old National Pike, the main highway west from the Chesapeake Bay to the Ohio Valley during the Civil War. They provide specific details of the events during the battle.

=== Fox's Gap ===
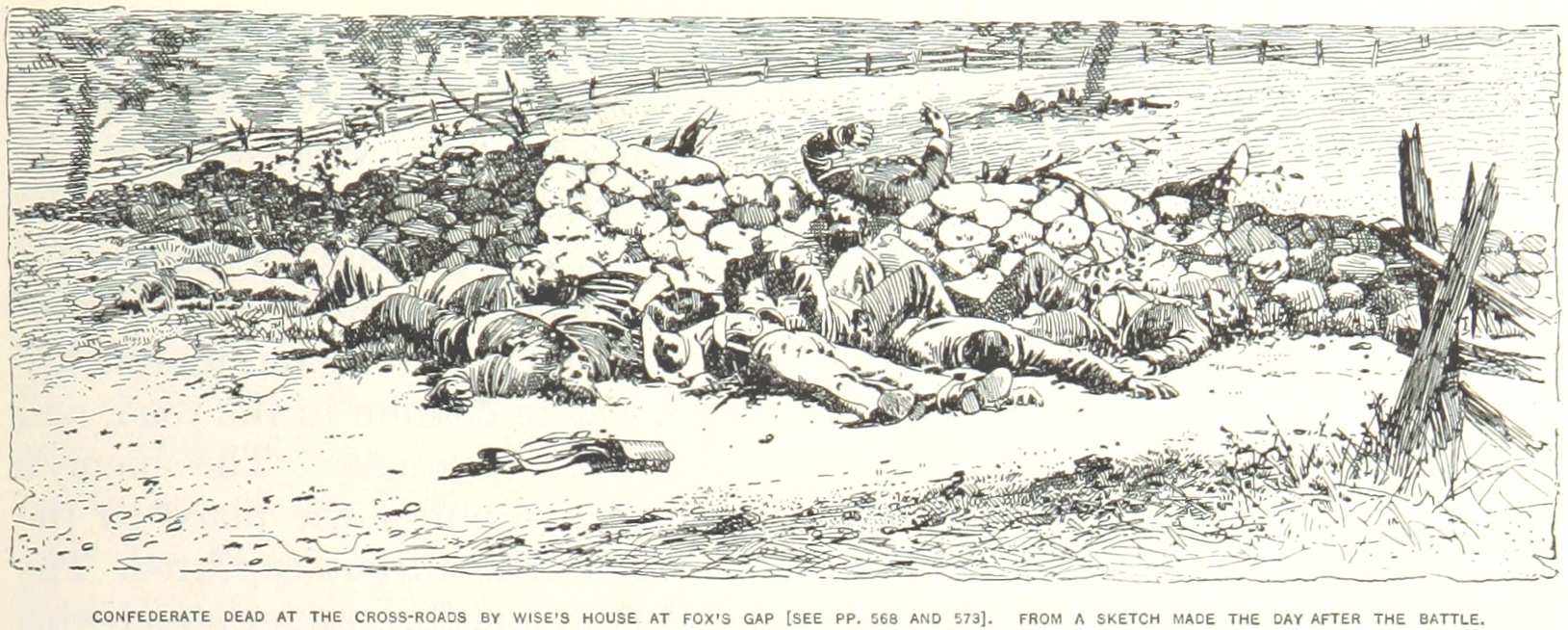
Confederate dead at Fox's Gap at Crossroads by Wise House

Just to the south, other elements of Hill's division (most notably Drayton's Brigade) defended Fox's Gap against Reno's IX Corps. A 9 a.m. attack by Union Brig. Gen. Jacob D. Cox's Kanawha Division secured much of the land south of the gap. In the movement, Lt. Col. Rutherford B. Hayes of the 23rd Ohio led a flank attack and was seriously wounded. Cox pushed through the North Carolinians positioned behind a stone wall at the gap's crest, but he failed to capitalize on his gains as his men were exhausted, allowing Confederate reinforcements to deploy in the gap around the Daniel Wise farm. Reno sent forward the rest of his corps, but due to the timely arrival of Southern reinforcements under Confederate Brig. Gen. John Bell Hood, they failed to dislodge the defenders.

Gen. Jesse Reno and Confederate Brig. Gen. Samuel Garland, Jr., were killed at Fox's Gap. After Farmer Wise was paid one dollar each to bury the Confederate soldiers who died behind the stone walls on or near his property, sixty (or more) bodies were dumped down his dry well.

== Aftermath ==
By dusk, with Crampton's Gap lost and his position at Fox's and Turner's Gaps precarious, Lee ordered his outnumbered forces to withdraw from South Mountain. McClellan was now in position to destroy Lee's army before it could concentrate. Union casualties of 28,000 engaged were 2,325 (443 killed, 1,807 wounded, and 75 missing); Confederates lost 2,685 (325 killed, 1560 wounded, and 800 missing) of 18,000. The Battle of South Mountain was an important morale booster for the defeat-stricken Army of the Potomac. The New York World wrote that the battle "turn[ed] back the tide of rebel successes" and "the strength of the rebels is hopelessly broken." Lee contemplated the end of his Maryland campaign. However, McClellan's limited activity on September 15 after his victory at South Mountain condemned the garrison at Harpers Ferry to capture and gave Lee time to unite his scattered divisions at Sharpsburg for the Battle of Antietam on September 17.

== Battlefield preservation ==
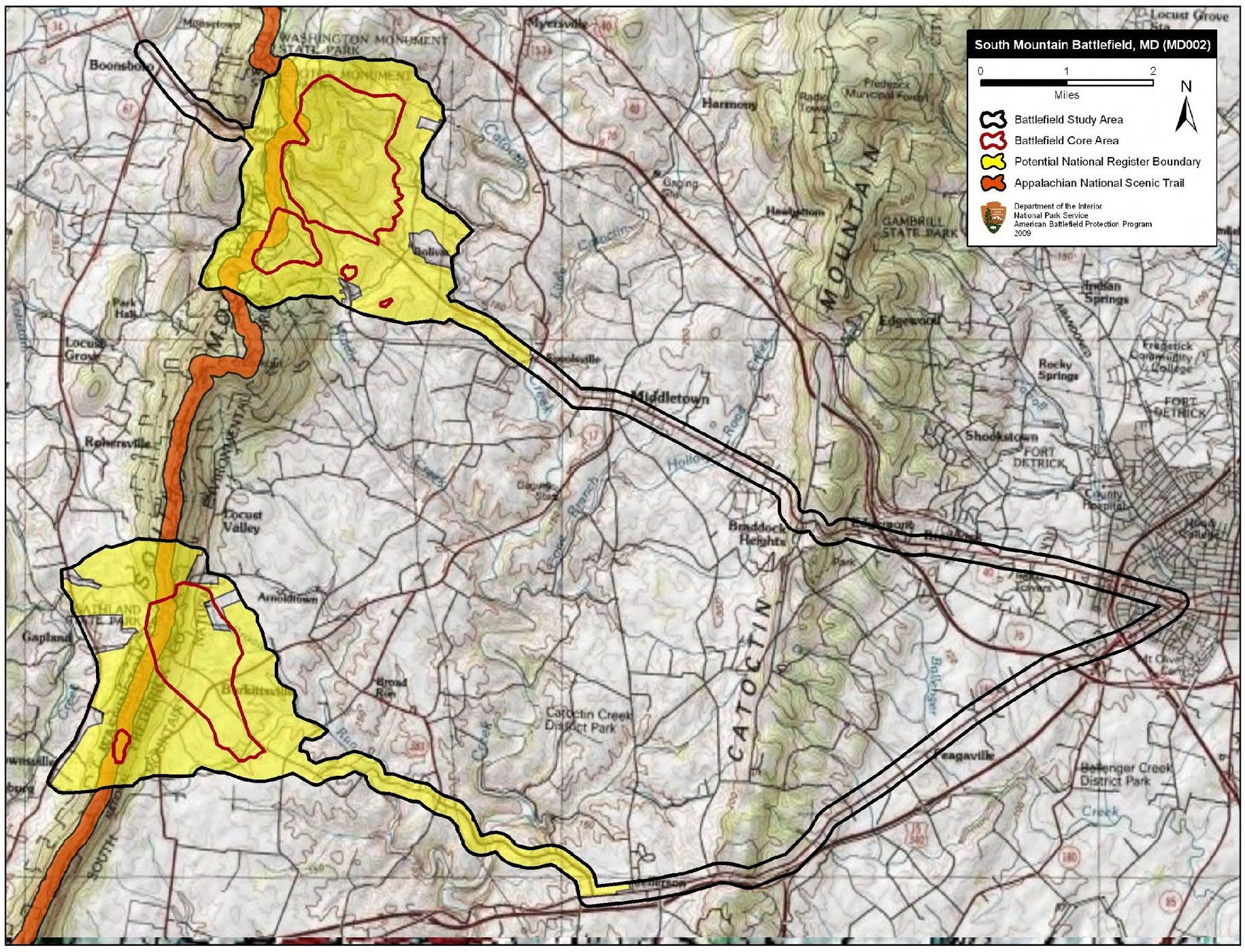
Map of South Mountain Battlefield core and study areas by the American Battlefield Protection Program

The American Battlefield Trust and its battlefield land preservation partners have acquired and preserved 703 acres of the South Mountain Battlefield through mid-2023. This includes 188 acres of land at the center of where the fighting took place in 1862. Most of the preserved area sits west of Route 40 south of where the old Sharpsburg Road (now known as Reno Monument Road) meets Fox’s Gap Road.

The battlefield's various sites, which Maryland recognizes as South Mountain State Battlefield Park, are preserved within the South Mountain State Park, Gathland State Park, and the Appalachian National Scenic Trail. Crampton's Gap Historic District and Turner's and Fox's Gaps Historic District are listed on the National Register of Historic Places.

18 acres were originally acquired by the Trust in 1991, to which 8 acres were added in 1995. More gains followed, as 136 acres were preserved in 2000, followed by 26 in 2004. Many of these additions were made with the assistance of the Maryland Environmental Trust.

In January 2011, the South Mountain battlefield gained National Heritage Landmark status and in August 2012, the State of Maryland declared its continued commitment to the preservation of these invaluable lands. The Civil War Trust followed these developments with a campaign to save 14 additional acres at the site. The Civil War Trust followed up with another successful preservation victory in 2013 by saving 298 acres of battlefield land at Turner's Gap.

However, nearby heritage areas in Frederick and Washington counties are still threatened by development, and South Mountain was listed as one of the Most Endangered Battlefields in the 2009 and 2010 editions of History Under Siege. Plans to further develop the site of a natural gas plant just south of Fox’s Gap remain a significant threat to portions of the South Mountain battlefield.

A significant portion of the battlefield near the west side of the Moser Road and Reno Monument Road intersection has not been preserved. For a description and analysis of the earliest land tracts and roads in the battlefield area, see The Land Tracts of the Battlefield of South Mountain.

== Future presidents ==
Two future presidents, Rutherford B. Hayes and William McKinley, fought at Fox's Gap during the Battle of South Mountain, as part of the 23rd Ohio Infantry—Hayes as its commander, and McKinley a commissary sergeant. Hayes would end the war as a brevet major general and McKinley a brevet major, and they would be elected to the presidency twenty years apart—Hayes in 1876, and McKinley in 1896.

== See also ==
- List of presidents of the United States by military service
