= Burkittsville Historic District =

Historic district in Maryland, United States

- Burkittsville
- U.S. National Register of Historic Places
- U.S. Historic district
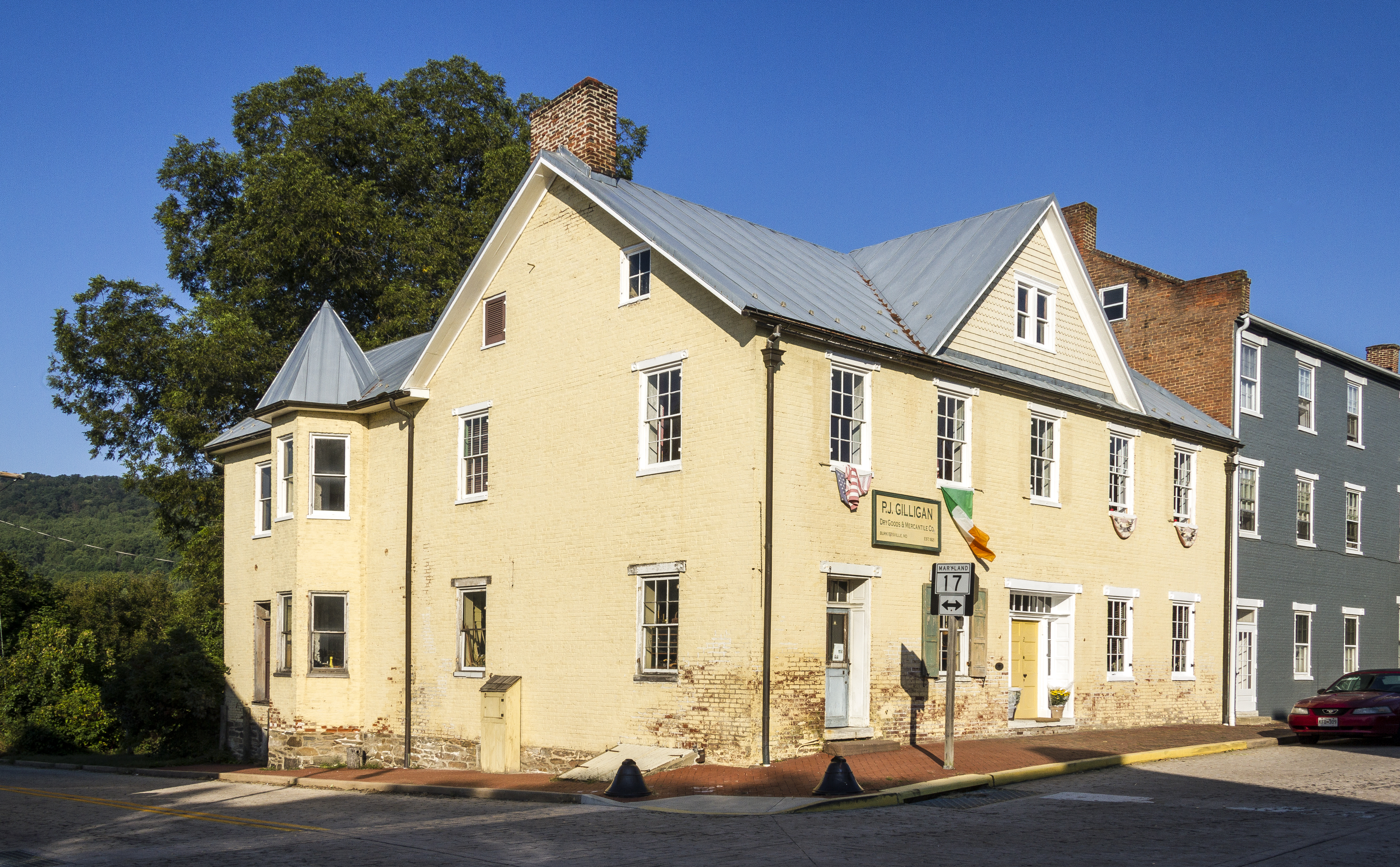

- Location within Maryland Location within the United States
- Location: MD 17 and Jefferson-Boonsboro Rd., Burkittsville, Maryland
- Coordinates: 39°23′31″N 77°37′39″W
- Area: 300 acres (120 ha)
- Built: 1790
- Architectural style: Late Victorian, Greek Revival, Federal
- NRHP reference No.: 75000891
- Added to NRHP: November 20, 1975

The Burkittsville Historic District comprises the small town of Burkittsville, Maryland. Located at a crossroads in western Frederick County, the town is a consistent collection of early 19th-century Federal style houses mixed with a few Victorian style houses that has remained virtually unchanged since 1900. The town is surrounded on three sides by an open, farmed landscape, and nestles against South Mountain on its western side.

The town was involved in a number of Civil War actions, including the Battle of Crampton's Gap in 1862.

The Burkittsville Historic District was listed on the National Register of Historic Places in 1975.
