= Zittlestown, Maryland =

Unincorporated community in Maryland, United States

- Unincorporated community
- Location within Maryland
- Coordinates: 39°29′11″N 77°37′32″W
- Country: United States
- State: Maryland
- County: Washington
- Elevation: 997 ft (304 m)
- Time zone: UTC−5 (Eastern (EST))
  - Summer (DST): UTC−4 (EDT)
- Area codes: 301 & 240
- GNIS feature ID: 591623

Zittlestown is an unincorporated community 2.2 miles (3.5 km) southeast of Boonsboro in Washington County, Maryland. It is situated on the western slope of South Mountain below Turner's Gap, along the historic National Pike, now designated U.S. Route 40 Alternate. Zittlestown is named after Michael Zittle, Sr. (1769-1850), who in 1811 purchased tracts of land there, and subdivided them.

In the American Civil War, the Battle of South Mountain on 14 September 1862 was fought around Zittlestown.
