= National War Correspondents Memorial =

Memorial in Maryland, United States

Coordinates: 39.405776°N 77.639312°W

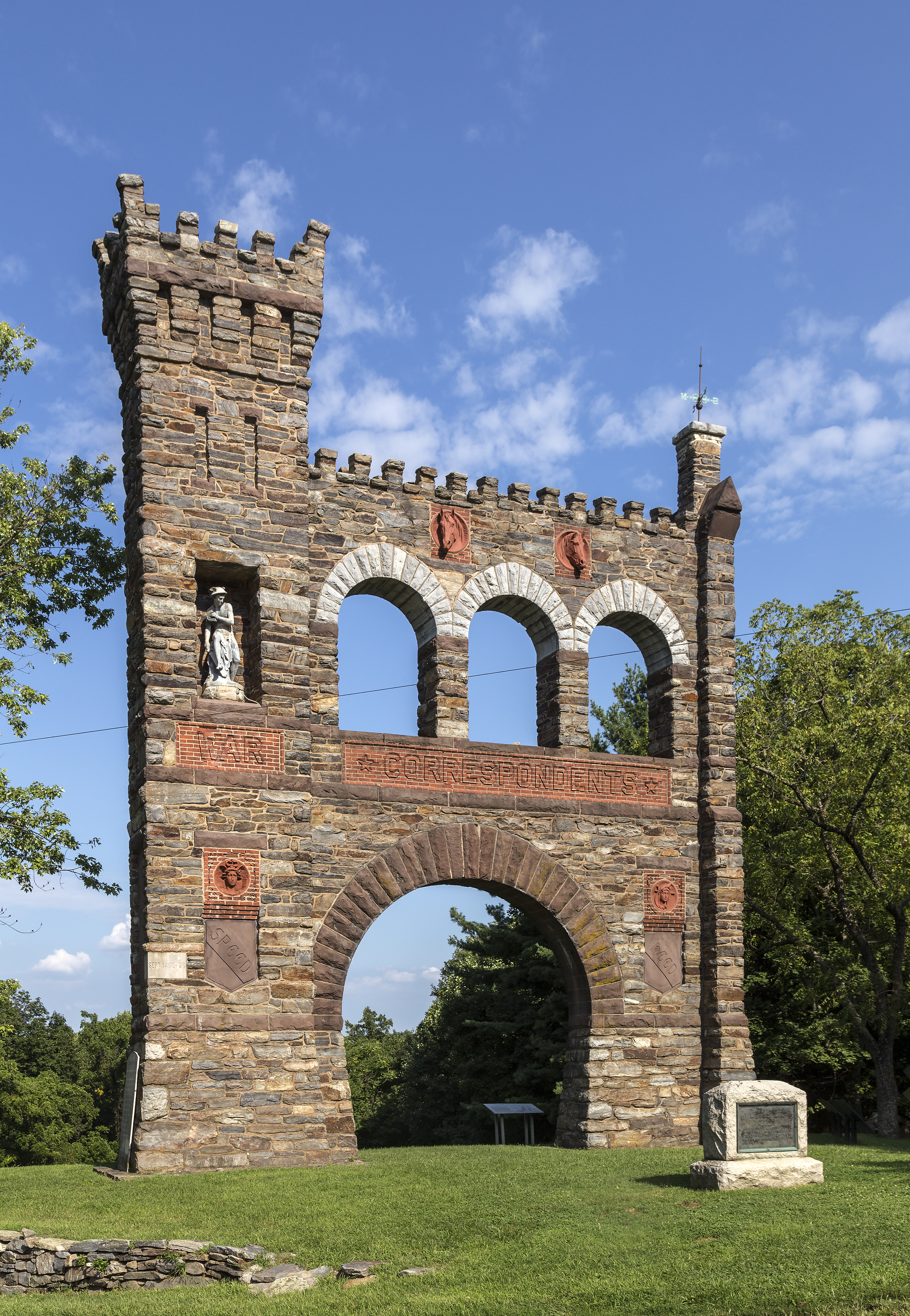
The War Correspondents Memorial Arch

The National War Correspondents Memorial, part of Gathland State Park, is a memorial dedicated to journalists who died in war. It is located at Crampton's Gap at South Mountain, near Burkittsville, Maryland, in the United States.

Civil War correspondent George Alfred Townsend, or "Gath", built the arch in 1896, and it was dedicated October 16, 1896.

It is claimed that the arch is the only monument in the world dedicated to journalists killed in combat. However, a tree in Arlington National Cemetery was also dedicated as a war correspondents' memorial in 1986.

== Description ==
The book George Alfred Townsend describes the monument:

In appearance the monument is quite odd. It is fifty feet high and forty feet broad. Above a Moorish arch sixteen feet high built of Hummelstown purple stone are super-imposed three Roman arches. These are flanked on one side with a square crenellated tower, producing a bizarre and picturesque effect. Niches in different places shelter the carving of two horses' heads, and symbolic terra cotta statuettes of Mercury, Electricity and Poetry. Tables under the horses' heads bear the suggestive words "Speed" and "Heed"; the heads are over the Roman arches. The three Roman arches are made of limestone from Creek Battlefield, Virginia, and each is nine feet high and six feet wide. These arches represent Description, Depiction and Photography. The aforementioned tower contains a statue of the Greek god Hermes (Roman god Mercury), the messenger of the gods, identifiable by the winged cap on his head. with the traditional pipes, and he is either half drawing or sheathing a Roman sword. Over a small turret on the opposite side of the tower is a gold vane of a pen bending a sword. At various places on the monument are quotations appropriate to the art of war correspondence. These are from a great variety of sources beginning with Old Testament verses. Perhaps the most striking feature of all are the tablets inscribed with the names of 157 correspondents and war artists who saw and described in narrative and picture almost all the events of the tour years of the war.

This account errs in that "Speed" and "Heed" appear under the heads of Electricity and Poetry, and the "statue of Pan" is actually a zinc copy of Bertel Thorvaldsen's Mercury About to Kill Argos created by the J.W. Fiske Company.

The monument's text:

SPEED – HEED
Sept. 14 – 62 – 96
To the Army Correspondents
and
Artists 1861–65

Whose toils cheered the fireside
Educated provinces of rustics into
a bright nation of readers
and gave incentive to narrate
distant wars and explore dark lands.

Erected by subscriptions
1896

And on its north side:

O wondrous youth
Through this grand ruth
Runs my boy's life, its thread
The General's fame, the battle's name
The rolls of maimed and dead
I bear with my thrilled soul astir
And lonely thoughts and fears
And am but history's courier
To bind the conquering years
A battle's ray, through ages gray
To light the deeds sublime
And flash the lustre of my day
Down all the aisles of time

War Correspondent Ballad – 1865

Although Townsend retained ownership of the property until his death in 1914, maintenance of the monument itself was entrusted to the National Park Service – previously to the War Department – in 1904.

The monument's plaques lists 157 names which are sometimes assumed to be all war correspondents. In the late 1990s, local historian Timothy J. Reese analyzed the list and asserted that only 135 can claim to be war correspondents or artists, and 33 of those are not identifiable in the historical record. Furthermore, many names are misstated and several important names are missing.

== Additions ==
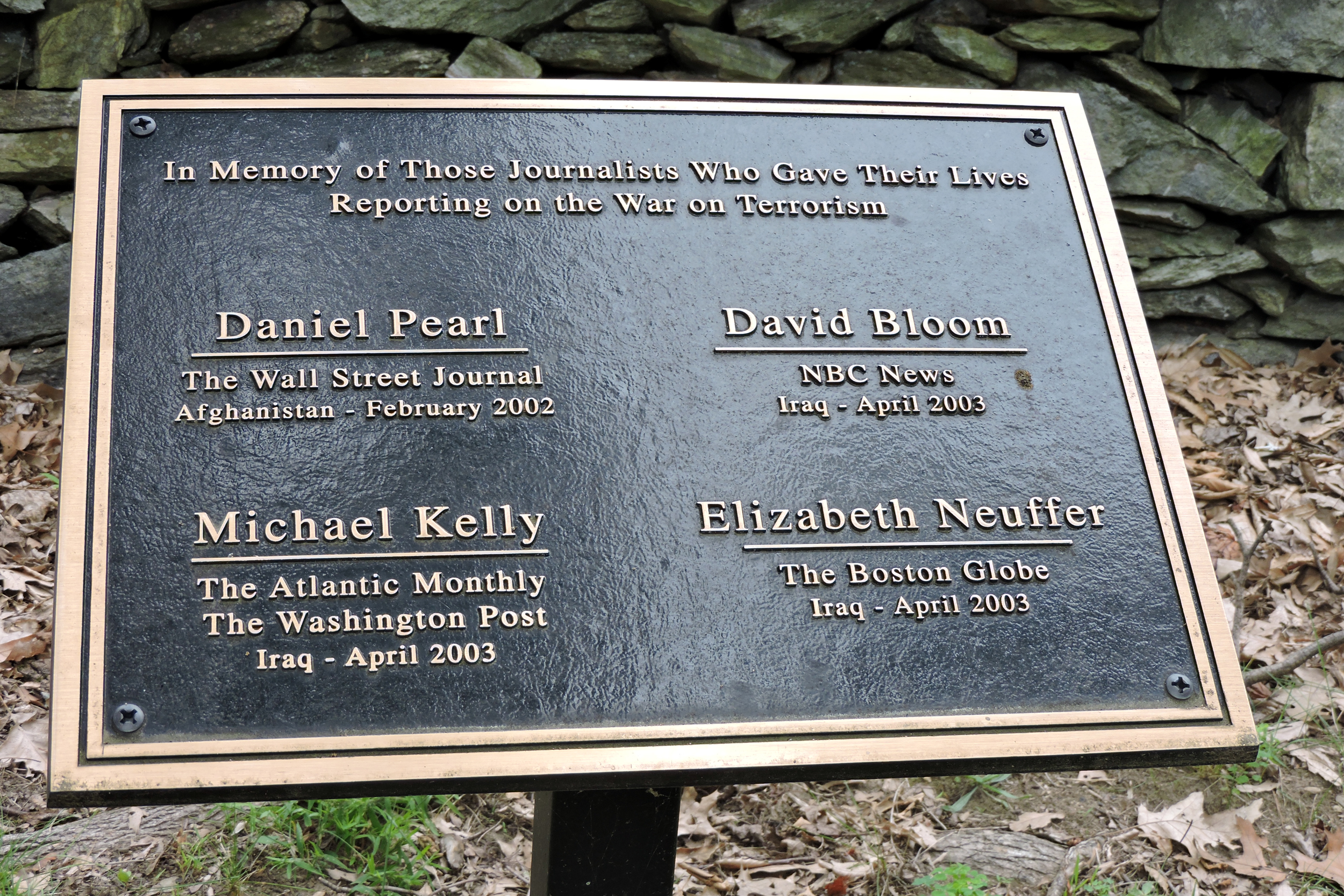
Memorial plaque added in 2003

Unchanged for over a century, the arch had four names added in 2003: David Bloom, Michael Kelly, Elizabeth Neuffer, and Daniel Pearl.
