= Burkittsville, Maryland =

Town in Maryland, United States

- Town
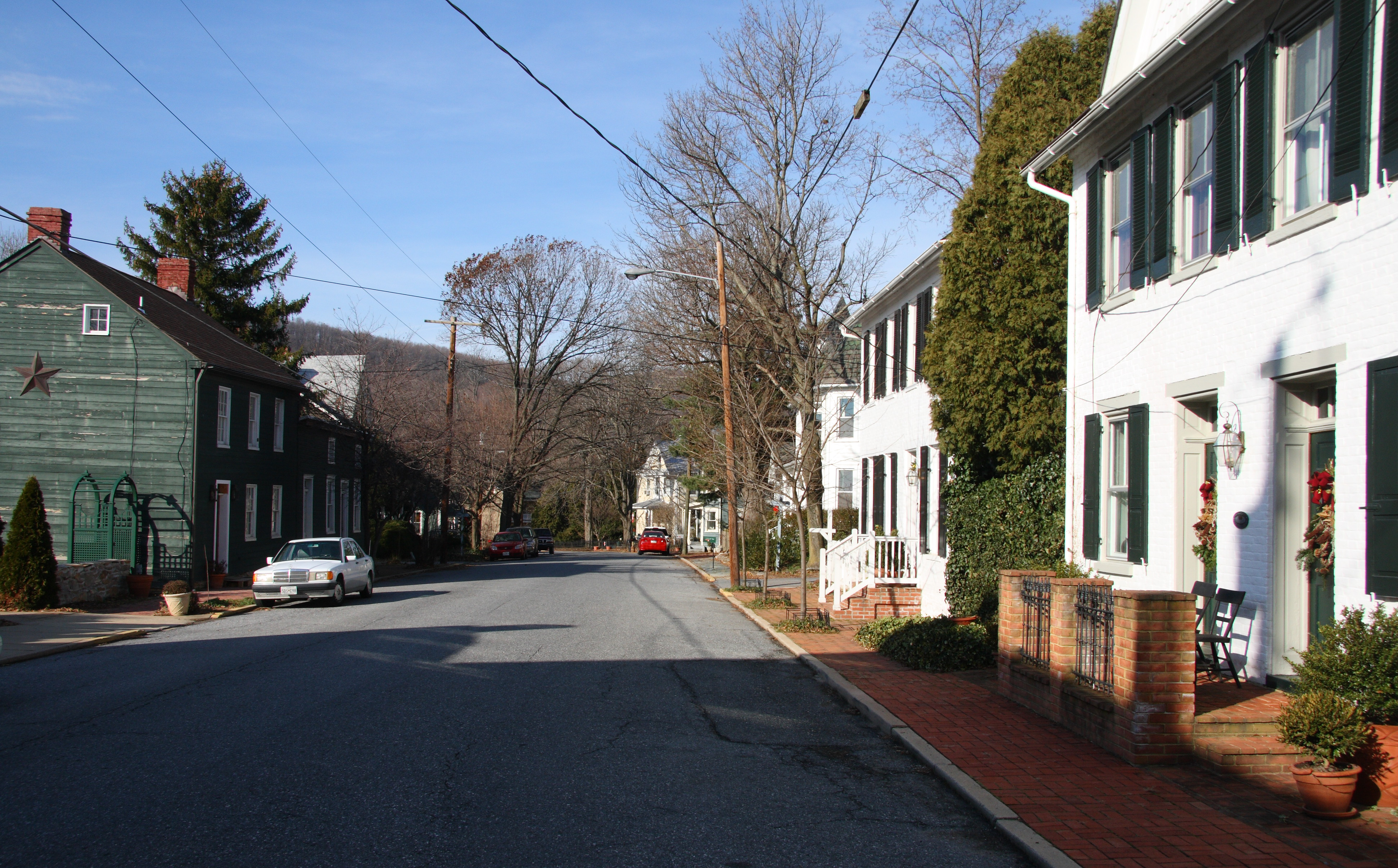
- Main Street in Burkittsville

- Flag Seal

- Location of Burkittsville, Maryland
- Coordinates: 39°23′30″N 77°37′33″W
- Country: United States
- State: Maryland
- County: Frederick
- Incorporated: 1894; 132 years ago

Area
  - Total: 0.46 sq mi (1.19 km^{2})
  - Land: 0.46 sq mi (1.18 km^{2})
  - Water: 0.0039 sq mi (0.01 km^{2})
- Elevation: 551 ft (168 m)

Population (2020)
  - Total: 142
  - Density: 313/sq mi (120.7/km^{2})
- Time zone: UTC−05:00 (Eastern (EST))
  - Summer (DST): UTC−04:00 (EDT)
- ZIP Code: 21718
- Area codes: 301, 240
- FIPS code: 24-11400
- GNIS feature ID: 2390762
- Website: Burkittsville-MD.gov

Burkittsville is a historic village in Frederick County, Maryland, United States. The village lies in the southern Middletown Valley along the eastern base of South Mountain.

Burkittsville is a residential area with an economy based in agriculture and tourism. The village was the scene of the Battle of Crampton's Gap, part of the Battle of South Mountain during the Maryland Campaign of the Civil War on September 14, 1862. Burkittsville was also made a subject of national attention when it was used as the setting of the 1999 horror film The Blair Witch Project. Nearby attractions include the Gathland State Park and the Appalachian Trail. A Gravity hill also exists nearby on Gapland road.

The population was 142 as of the 2020 census.

== History ==
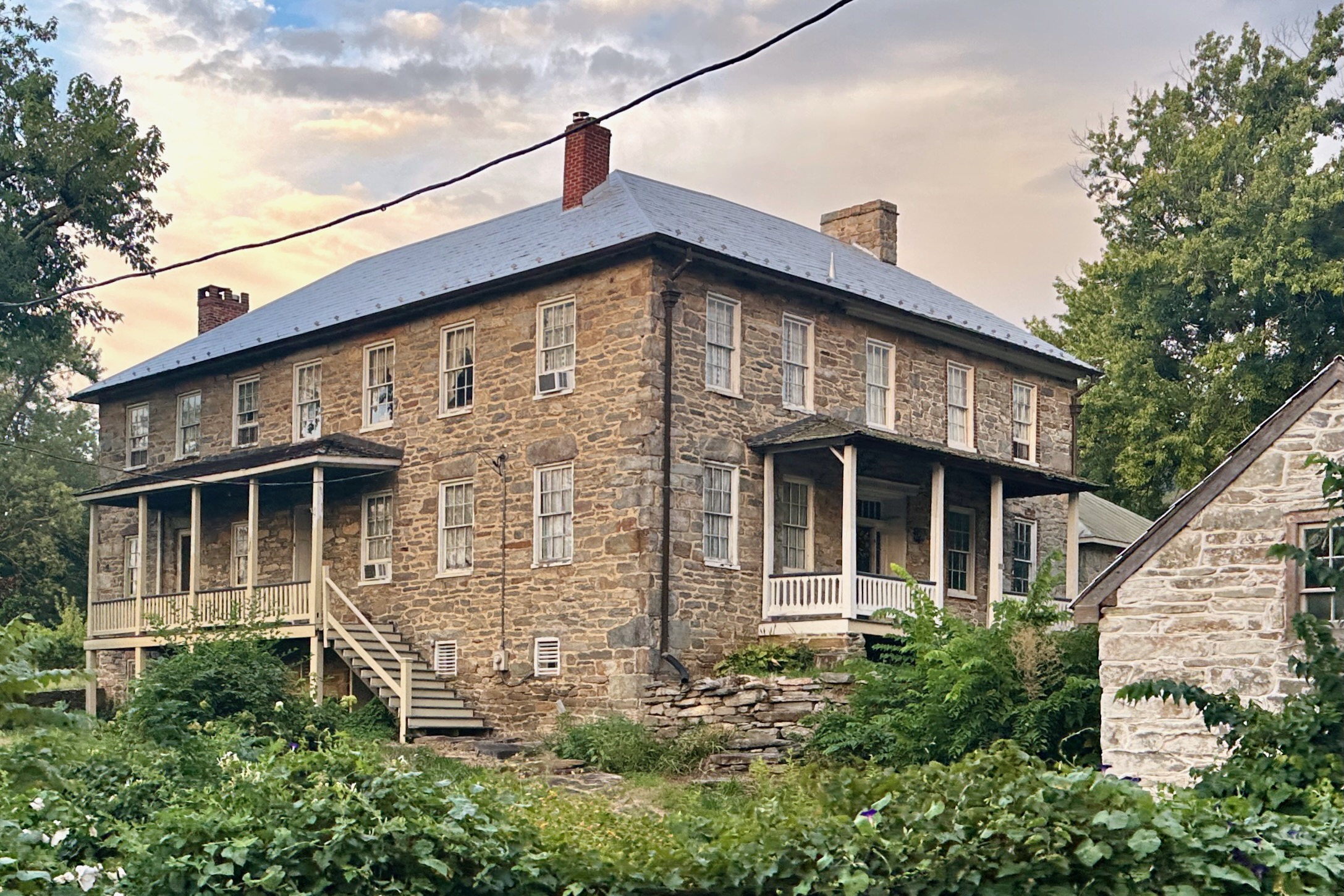
Harley/Arnold Farm

English settlement in this region began in the early 18th century. Land was being surveyed and patented in the south-western portion of the Middletown Valley beginning in the 1720s. The first land tract to be patented within the present boundaries of Burkittsville was "Dawson's Purchase", dated May 14, 1741. The Harley/Arnold Farm, located on the western border of the village at the base of South Mountain, stands on the "Dawson's Purchase" tract.

Burkittsville was first founded by two property owners: Major Joshua Harley and Henry Burkitt. The western half was first founded as "Harley's Post Office" in 1824. After Harley's passing in 1828, Burkitt renamed it Burkittsville. Over the next thirty years it grew as a community with stores, shops, blacksmiths, a schoolhouse, and a tannery.

On September 13, 1862, Confederate cavalry under command of Colonel Thomas Munford (under General J.E.B. Stuart) occupied Burkittsville. On Sunday, September 14, the forces of the Union and Confederate armies engaged in the Battle of Crampton's Gap, a bloody prelude to the Battle of Antietam. The Reformed and Lutheran churches and adjacent schoolhouse were used as hospitals for the more than 300 wounded of both sides. These buildings still stand today.

Routinely characterized as the trigger to Antietam, victory at Crampton's Gap embodied Union Gen. George B. McClellan's strategic reaction to his acquiring the legendary “Lost Order” at Frederick which disclosed Confederate Gen. Robert E. Lee's campaign movements. It was McClellan's intention to “cut the enemy in two and beat him in detail”.

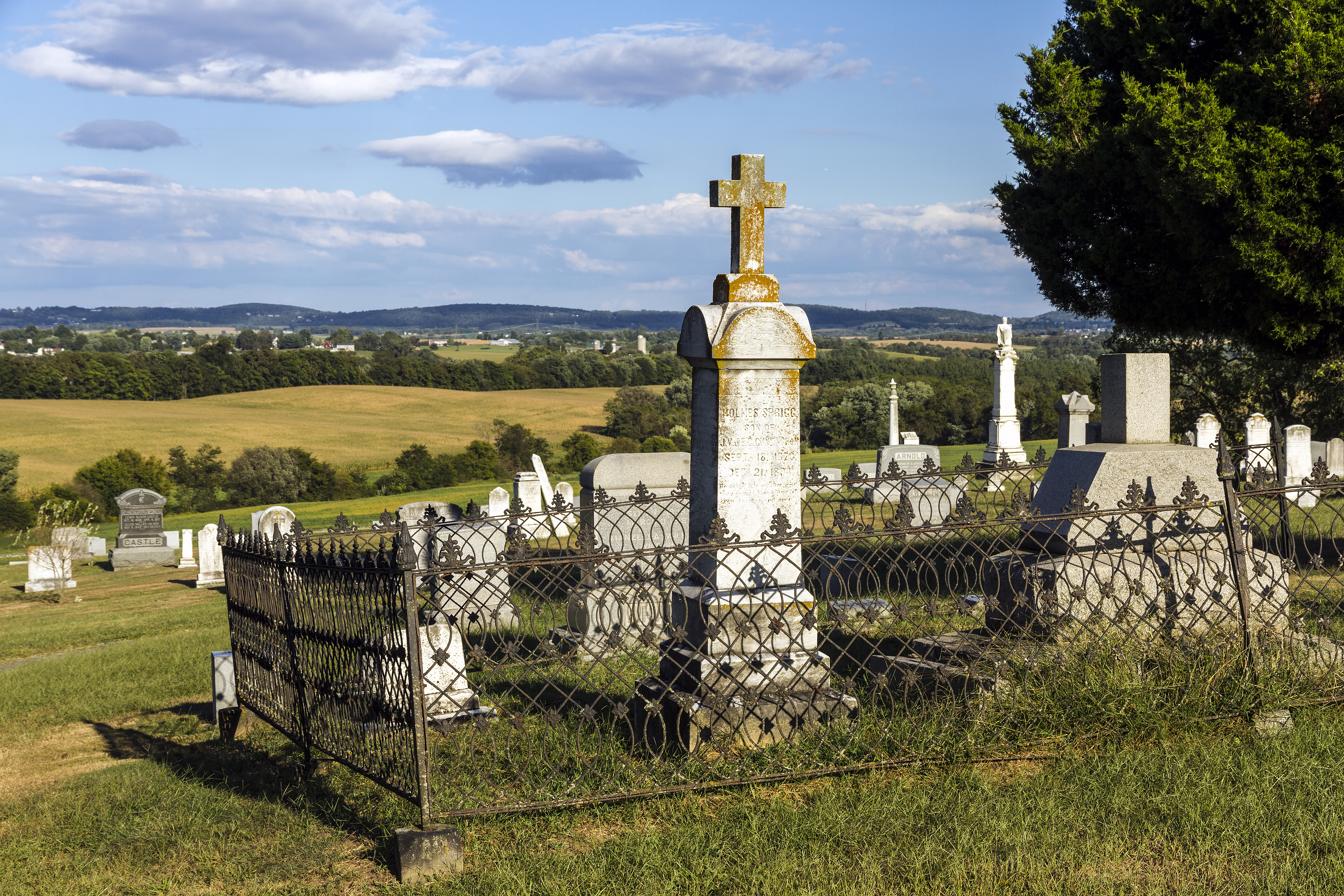
Union Cemetery in Burkittsville, established in 1831.

After seizing Crampton's Gap Gen. William B. Franklin failed to relieve the besieged Union garrison at Harpers Ferry, and more importantly to prevent Confederate generals James Longstreet and “Stonewall” Jackson from reuniting at Sharpsburg. There Lee hastily stood his ground in the mammoth battle of Antietam, the war's bloodiest day. President Abraham Lincoln then used the marginal Union victory at Antietam as a springboard to his Emancipation Proclamation which changed war aims. Without the fall of Crampton's Gap there would have been no Antietam.

Nearly all of Burkittsville is a historic district, listed on the National Register of Historic Places on November 20, 1975. The 300 acres (120 ha) district includes about 70 contributing structures. The Burkittsville Historic District is itself part of the larger Crampton's Gap Historic District, which comprises the southern portion of the lands involved in the Battle of South Mountain, extending from the western side of Crampton's Gap, over South Mountain and about a mile to the east of Burkittsville.

=== Blair Witch ===
Burkittsville gained fame with the 1999 film The Blair Witch Project and the franchise.

== Geography ==
According to the United States Census Bureau, the town has a total area of 0.45 square miles (1.17 km^{2}), all land.

== Transportation ==
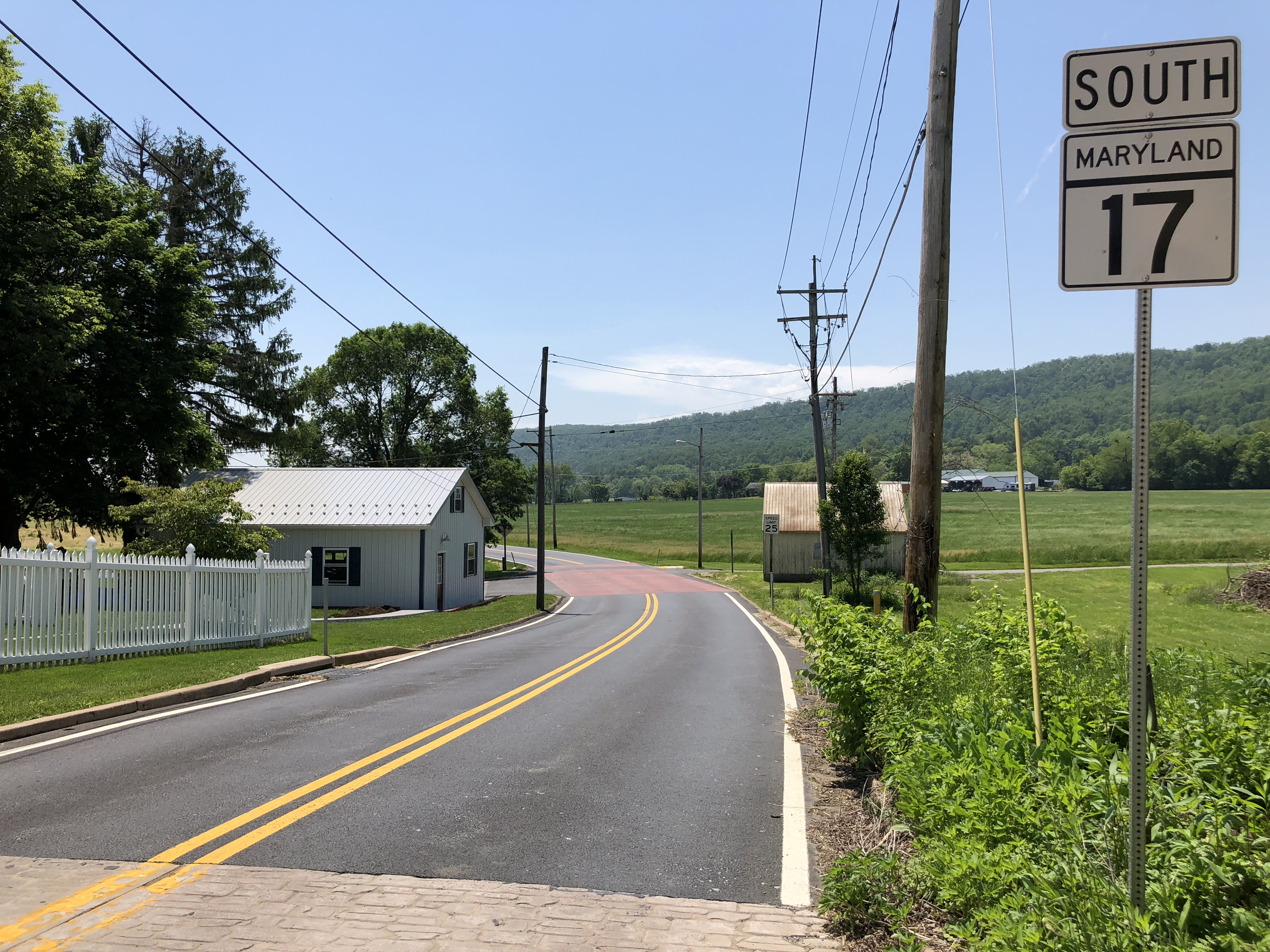
MD 17 southbound leaving central Burkittsville

The main method of travel to and from Burkittsville is by road. The only significant highway serving the town is Maryland Route 17, which follows Potomac Street within the town limits. To the north, MD 17 connects to Middletown and eventually reaches Interstate 70 in Myersville. Heading south, MD 17 interchanges with U.S. Route 340 just before reaching Brunswick.

== Demographics ==
Historical population
Census	Pop.	Note	%±
1870	293		—
1880	280		−4.4%
1890	273		−2.5%
1900	229		−16.1%
1910	228		−0.4%
1920	200		−12.3%
1930	173		−13.5%
1940	177		2.3%
1950	190		7.3%
1960	208		9.5%
1970	221		6.3%
1980	202		−8.6%
1990	194		−4.0%
2000	171		−11.9%
2010	151		−11.7%
2020	142		−6.0%
U.S. Decennial Census

=== 2010 census ===
As of the 2010 census there were 151 people, 69 households, and 42 families residing in the town. The population density was 335.6 inhabitants per square mile (129.6/km^{2}). There were 74 housing units at an average density of 164.4 per square mile (63.5/km^{2}). The racial makeup of the town was 99.3% White and 0.7% Asian. Hispanic or Latino of any race were 1.3% of the population.

There were 69 households, of which 20.3% had children under the age of 18 living with them, 50.7% were married couples living together, 4.3% had a female householder with no husband present, 5.8% had a male householder with no wife present, and 39.1% were non-families. 34.8% of all households were made up of individuals, and 10.1% had someone living alone who was 65 years of age or older. The average household size was 2.19 and the average family size was 2.79.

The median age in the town was 50.5 years. 15.9% of residents were under the age of 18; 3.9% were between the ages of 18 and 24; 21.9% were from 25 to 44; 43.1% were from 45 to 64; and 15.2% were 65 years of age or older. The gender makeup of the town was 50.3% male and 49.7% female.

=== 2000 census ===
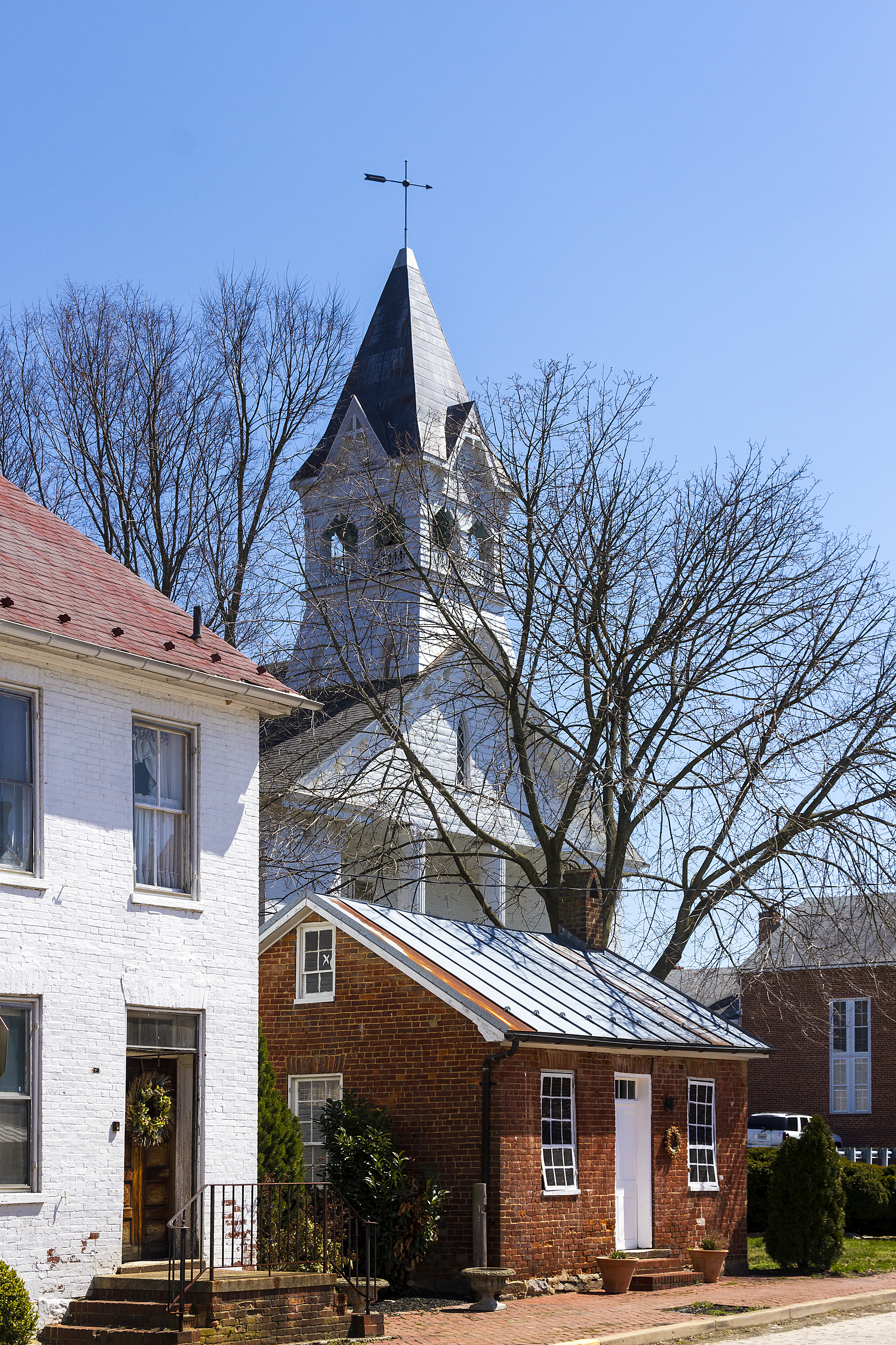
Resurrection Reformed Church

As of the census of 2000, there were 171 people, 72 households, and 49 families residing in the town. The population density was 415.8 inhabitants per square mile (160.5/km^{2}). There were 76 housing units at an average density of 184.8 per square mile (71.4/km^{2}). The racial makeup of the town was 94.74% White, 1.17% African American and 4.09% Asian. 1.8 percent of the population is Hispanic or Latino of any race.

There were 72 households out of which 30.6% had children under the age of 18 living with them, 61.1% were married couples living together, 5.6% had a female householder with no husband present, and 31.9% were non-families. 26.4% of all households were made up of individuals, and 5.6% had someone living alone who was 65 years of age or older. The average household size was 2.38 and the average family size was 2.92.

In the town, the population was spread out, with 22.8% under the age of 18, 2.3% from 18 to 24, 38.6% from 25 to 44, 28.1% from 45 to 64, and 8.2% who were 65 years of age or older. The median age was 40 years. For every 100 females, there were 85.9 males. For every 100 females age 18 and over, there were 88.6 males.

The median income for a household in the town was $50,313, and the median income for a family was $53,125. Males had a median income of $45,833 versus $30,417 for females. The per capita income for the town was $24,919. About 4.1% of families and 4.4% of the population were below the poverty line, including none of those under the age of eighteen and 5.6% of those 65 or over.

== Education ==
It is in Frederick County Public Schools.

School zoning is as follows: Valley Elementary School, Brunswick Middle School, and Brunswick High School.

== Points of interest ==
- P.J. Gilligan Dry Goods & Mercantile Co. (1821)
- Burkittsville Union Cemetery
- South Mountain Heritage Society Museum (2002)
- Spook Hill Cider & Wine 4-Mile Run
