= Crampton's Gap =

Wind gap on South Mountain in Maryland

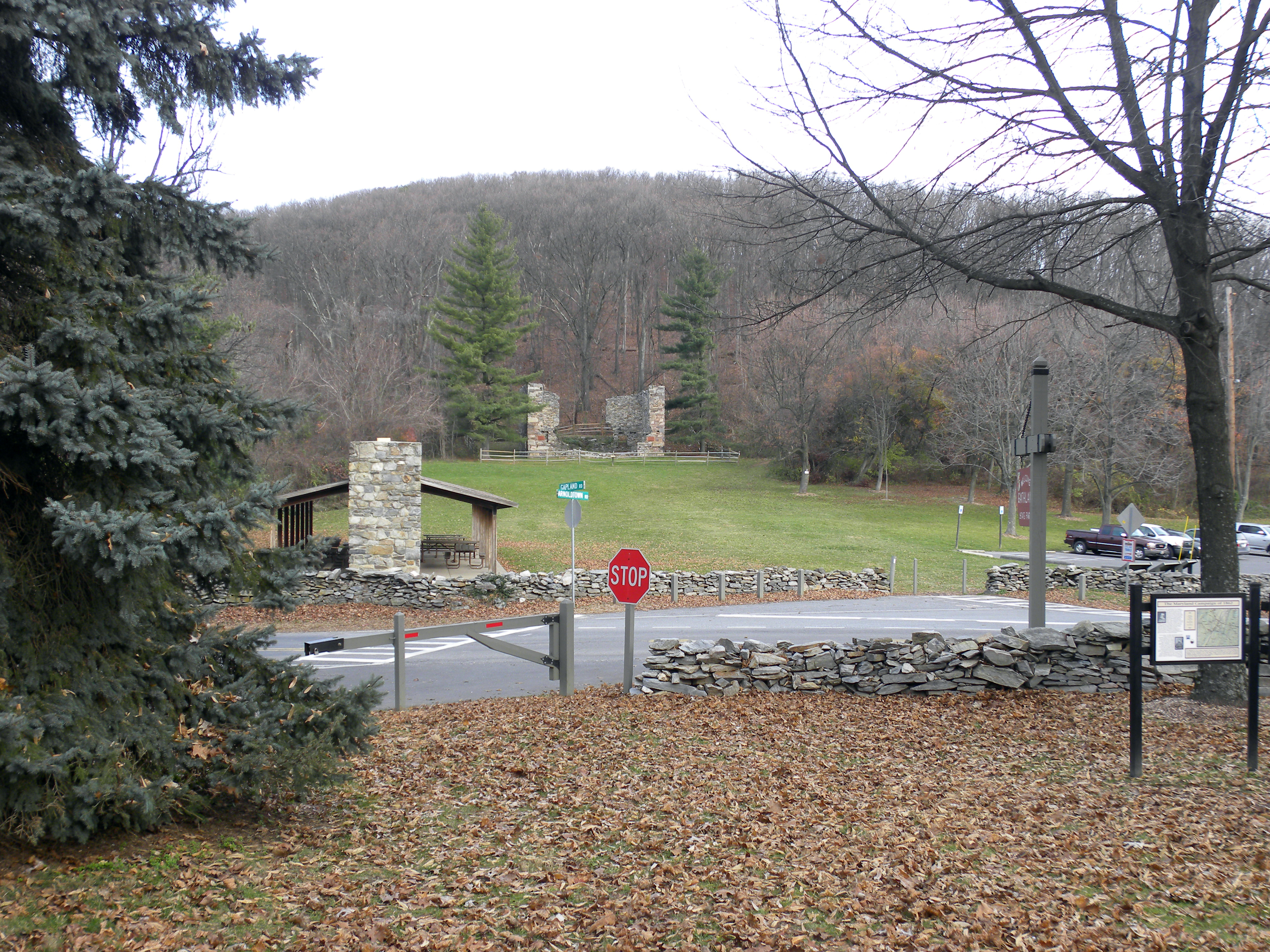
- Crampton's Gap looking from the south side (Gathland State Park) to the north

- Location within Maryland
- Elevation: 928 feet (283 m)
- Traversed by: Gapland Road

Third Approach
- Location: Frederick County and Washington County, Maryland, United States
- Range: South Mountain; Blue Ridge Mountains
- Coordinates: 39°25′N 77°38′W

Crampton's Gap, also known as Crampton Gap, is a wind gap on South Mountain in Maryland.

The 928 feet (283 m) gap connects Burkittsville in the Middletown Valley to the east with Gapland and Rohrersville in the Pleasant Valley to the west.

Documentation of the earliest land tracts in the Crampton's Gap area and records related to the earliest road may be found in The Land Tracts of the Battlefield of South Mountain by Curtis L. Older.

The gap is the location of Gathland State Park and was the site of the Battle of Crampton's Gap on September 14, 1862, during the Maryland Campaign of the American Civil War.

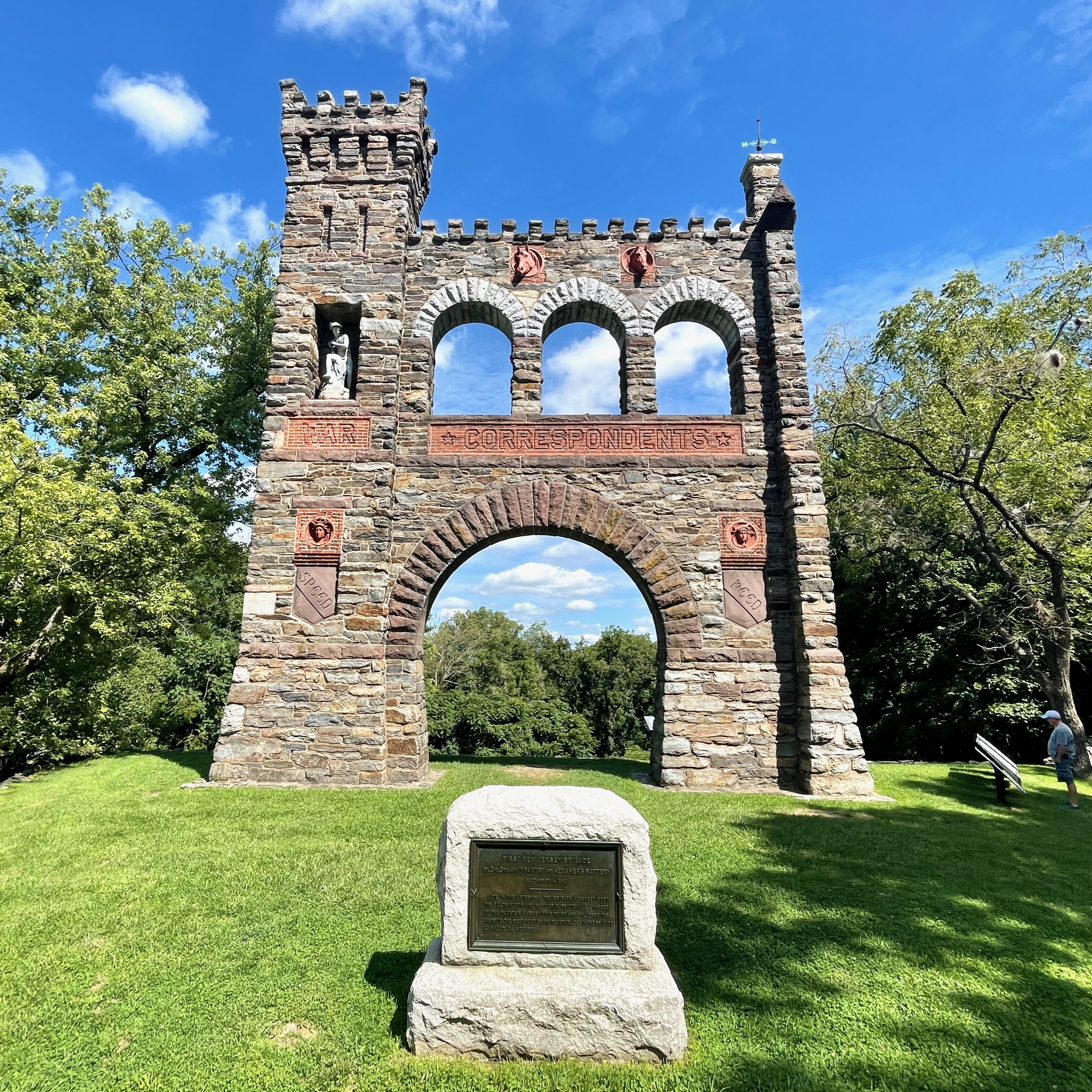
War Correspondents Memorial Arch and First New Jersey Brigade Monument at Crampton's Gap
