= Robert H. Chilton =

Confederate general in the American Civil War (1815–1879)

Robert Hall Chilton
- Robert H. Chilton
- Born: February 25, 1815; Loudoun County, Virginia
- Died: February 18, 1879 (aged 63); Columbus, Georgia
- Burial place: Hollywood Cemetery (Richmond, Virginia)
- Spouse: Laura Ann Thomson Mason (1829–1911)
- Military career
- Allegiance: United States of America; Confederate States of America
- Branch: United States Army; Confederate States Army
- Service years: 1837–1861 (USA); 1861–1865 (CSA)
- Rank: Major (USA); Brigadier General (CSA)
- Unit: 1st Regiment of Dragoons
- Conflicts: Mexican–American War; American Civil War
- Other work: President of the Columbus Manufacturing Company (1869‑79)

Robert Hall Chilton (February 25, 1815 – February 18, 1879) was an officer in the U.S. Army and then a brigadier general in the Confederate States Army during the American Civil War. He served as chief of staff for the Army of Northern Virginia under Robert E. Lee for much of the war.

== Biography ==
Chilton was born in Loudoun County, Virginia, to a prominent family. He was the son of William and Sarah (Powell) Chilton. He secured an appointment to the United States Military Academy and graduated 48th out of 57 cadets in the Class of 1837. Brevetted as a second lieutenant, he was assigned to the 1st Regiment of Dragoons for western frontier duty. On September 25, 1845, he married Laura Ann Thomson Mason (1829–1911) in New York City. The couple had three children: Laura Mason, Emily Virginia, and Robert Lee Chilton. He served in Kansas, Texas, and the Indian Territory. While fighting in a series of skirmishes with Osage Indians, he also served as acting quartermaster.

Promoted to captain in 1846, Chilton fought in the Mexican–American War, winning the brevet rank of major for gallantry in action at the Battle of Buena Vista. Under severe Mexican fire, he picked up the wounded Colonel Jefferson Davis and carried him to safety. He was assigned to administrative duty as a paymaster with the rank of major in 1854, serving in various posts in Washington, D.C., New York City, Detroit, Michigan, and San Antonio, Texas.

Chilton was in Texas when he received word of the bombardment of Fort Sumter. He resigned his commission in the U.S. Army on April 29, 1861, and traveled home to Virginia. He enrolled in the Confederate service as an adjutant general with the rank of lieutenant colonel. He served on the staff of fellow Virginian Robert E. Lee, rising to chief of staff. He did not pen the famous Lost Order during the Maryland Campaign. The identity of the writer of Special Order 191, the lost order that McClellan received from the field, is yet to be identified. However, Lt. Col. Chilton did sign his name on S.O. 191, this being the proof of authenticity needed to convince the over cautious Maj. Gen. McClellen after a member of staff, who had served with Chilton in the old U.S. Army recognized Chilton’s penmanship. The second occurrence where Col. Chilton placed the Army of Northern Virginia in a position of potential destruction was during the Chancellorsville campaign. When relaying General Lee’s orders in person to Maj. Gen Jubal Early’s command at Fredericksburg, Col. Chilton changed Lee’s discretionary order into a peremptory order to move Early’s command from the Fredericksburg entrenched lines protecting the army’s rear. Despite by Gen. Early and Chief of Artillery Pendleton’s protest and explanation of the danger this placed the entire Confederate army in, General Early, leaving a few men and guns behind, began the movement to Gen. Lee’s position. Maj. Gen. John Sedgwick’s over caution and timid movement saved the Army of Northern Virginia from disaster, for by the time (several hours later) Sedgwick began moving his Corps forward, Lee had discovered the mistake and Maj. Gen. Early had returned to his entrenched high ground. Although nominated for brigadier general in October 1862 and despite firm support from General Lee, Chilton's appointment was not officially confirmed by the Confederate Congress until February 16, 1864, most likely because of repeated clashes with the Confederate Senate and with fellow officers, most notably John B. Magruder.

Following the Gettysburg campaign, he served as inspector general for the Army of Northern Virginia for the rest of the war, with his headquarters in Richmond, Virginia. He rarely led troops in the field, with the exception of a successful attack in May 1864 when he led a small force of Virginia troops in routing Federal troops from the Army of the James that were raiding the important Richmond & Petersburg Railroad.

Following the cessation of hostilities in early 1865, Chilton returned to civilian life. He moved to Columbus, Georgia, where he became president of a local manufacturing company. He died of apoplexy in Columbus in 1879. He is buried in Hollywood Cemetery in Richmond, Virginia.

== Honors ==
The Major Robert H. Chilton monument in Chilton Park in Dodge City, Kansas, was unveiled May 28, 1931.

== See also ==
- List of American Civil War generals (Confederate)
