= Battle of Crampton's Gap =

1862 Battle of the American Civil War

Battle of Crampton's Gap Battle of Burkittsville
- Part of the American Civil War
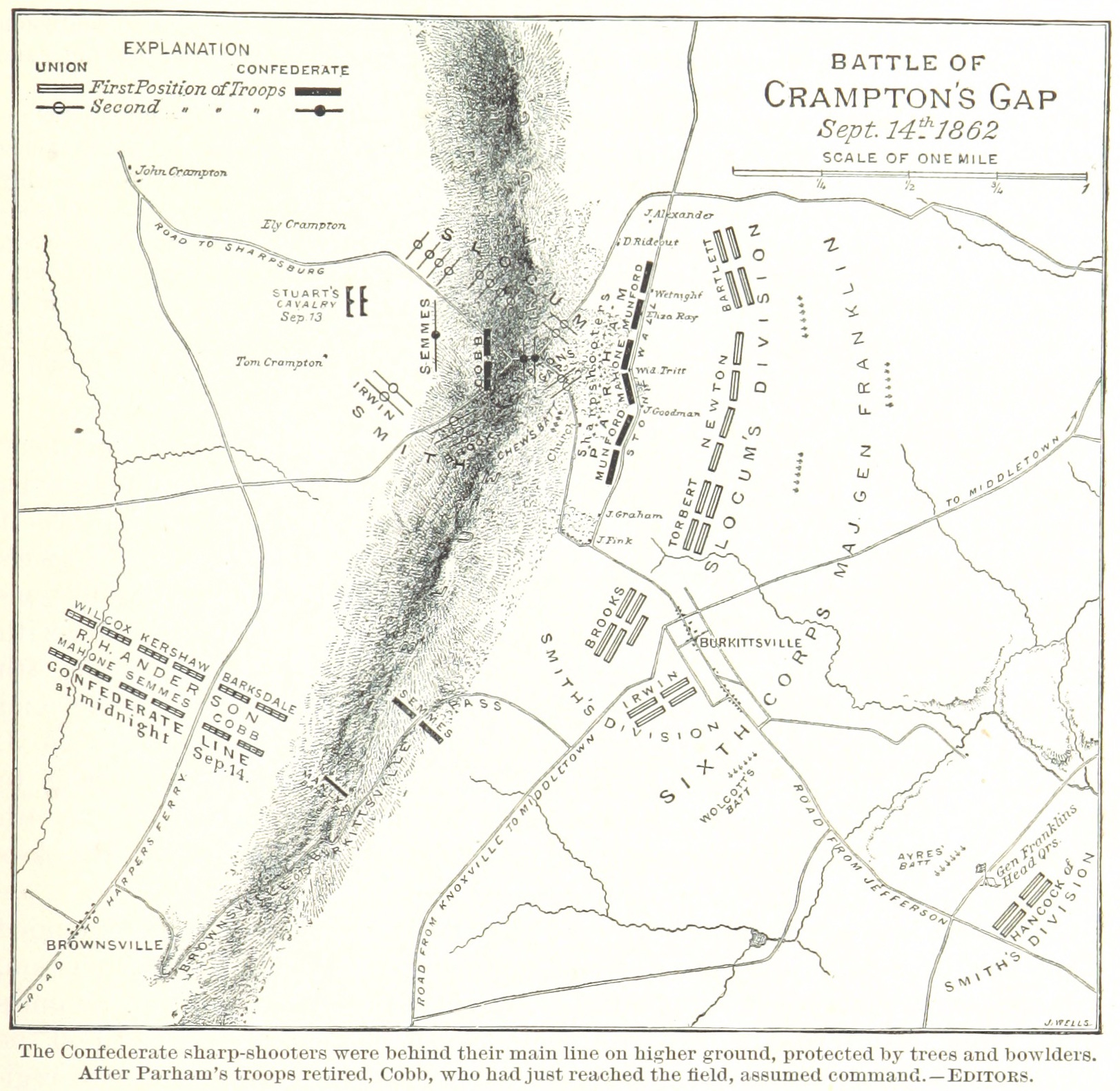
- A map of the battle
Date	September 14, 1862
Location	Frederick County and Washington County, Maryland, United States 39.41°N 77.64°W
Result	Draw (see aftermath)

Belligerents
United States (Union)	(Confederate States of America) CSA (Confederacy)

Commanders and leaders
(United States) William B. Franklin	Howell Cobb

Strength
12,800	2,100

Casualties and losses
533 total (115 killed, 416 wounded, 2 missing)	887 total (130 killed, 759 wounded)
- Location of the battle in Maryland

The Battle of Crampton's Gap, or Battle of Burkittsville, (Note: It was known as "Crampton's Gap" by the Union, but as "Burkittsville" by the Confederacy.) was fought between forces under Confederate Brig. Gen. Howell Cobb and Union Maj. Gen. William B. Franklin as part of the Battle of South Mountain on September 14, 1862, at Crampton's Gap in Western Maryland, during the Maryland Campaign of the American Civil War.

Franklin's VI Corps attacked a small, hastily assembled Confederate force at Crampton's Gap in South Mountain that sought to protect the rear of Confederate Maj. Gen. Lafayette McLaws, who was across Pleasant Valley on Maryland Heights taking part in the siege of Harpers Ferry. Despite inferior numbers, the Confederate force held out throughout the day, taking heavy casualties. By the evening the VI Corps broke the Confederate line and proceeded through the gap into Pleasant Valley. Franklin, however, failed to follow up on his success and did not attack McLaws on Maryland Heights.

Tactically the battle resulted in a Union victory because they broke the Confederate line and drove through the gap. Strategically, the Confederates were successful in stalling the Union advance and were able to protect McLaws' rear.

== Background ==
On September 13, 1862, Union Maj. Gen. George B. McClellan received a lost copy of Robert E. Lee's Special Order No. 191, which detailed the Confederate plan of action in Maryland. This included the important information that Lee had divided his army and sent a portion to capture Harpers Ferry.

As part of that siege, units under Maj. Gen. Lafayette McLaws were sent to take Maryland Heights and then bombard the Union garrison in the town. To protect his rear flank, McLaws stationed a small guard at Brownsville Gap (a smaller gap a few miles south of Crampton's Gap) and Crampton's Gap, both of which allowed access to Pleasant Valley and the eastern slope of Maryland Heights. The force at Crampton's Gap consisted of one battery of artillery, three regiments of infantry under Brig. Gen. William Mahone, one brigade under Brig. Gen. Howell Cobb, and a small cavalry detachment under Col. Thomas T. Munford. After the report of a very large number of camp fires indicating a much larger Union force than anticipated, General Lee recognized the threat this posed to his split forces, so the order was sent down to General Cobb to ..."hold the gap if it cost the life of every man in my command".

McClellan ordered Maj. Gen. William Franklin and his VI Corps to set out for Burkittsville from his camp at Buckeystown the following morning at daybreak, with instructions to drive through Crampton's Gap and attack McLaws' rear. Although he sent the order immediately, by allowing Franklin to wait until morning to depart, his order resulted in a delay of nearly 11 hours.

== Battle ==
The small Confederate force used the terrain to its maximum advantage with three regiments of Mahone's brigade and Munford's cavalrymen initially stationed at the eastern base of the mountain, the artillery halfway up its slope, and Cobb's brigade entrenched at the summit. From their vantage point on the mountain they watched throughout the morning as Franklin's VI Corps marched across the Middletown Valley towards them.

When the Federals reached Burkittsville around noon, the Confederate artillery opened up. In Burkittsville, while under artillery fire, Franklin assembled his troops into three columns. At 3 p.m., after a delay of nearly 3 hours, the VI Corps finally began its assault. The reason for the delay has never been ascertained, but it would prove costly. The Union advance was slow and steady, supported by artillery. Their superior numbers quickly overwhelmed Mahone's regiments and the cavalry along with the artillery on the slopes of the mountain. The retreating Confederates were briefly rallied at the summit by General Cobb, but an oncoming charge by the First New Jersey Brigade (the first four New Jersey regiments) was too much. Once the VI Corps reached the summit they drove the Confederates from their positions, inflicting heavy casualties, in just fifteen minutes of fighting. Confederate losses included an aide to Cobb, John Basil Lamar and Jefferson M. Lamar, the younger brother of Lucius Q. C. Lamar. Both Lamars were related to Cobb's wife the former Mary Ann Lamar.

After the Confederate line at the summit broke, the troops scattered in all directions into Pleasant Valley and, afterward, were completely unable to fight more against the Federals. However, before their rout, they had held out for three hours, which, in concert with the delay of the VI Corps getting to and beginning the attack on Crampton's Gap, meant that it was after 6:00 p.m. when Franklin reassembled his men in Pleasant Valley and too late to begin a second attack on McLaws' force on Maryland Heights. The following day Harpers Ferry surrendered to the Confederates, while Franklin sat camped in Pleasant Valley, convinced he was outnumbered by McLaws by nearly two to one.

== Aftermath ==
In total, the VI Corps suffered 115 killed, 416 wounded, and 2 missing, for a total of 533 casualties. The Confederate forces suffered 130 killed and 759 wounded, for a total of 887 casualties.

Tactically, the Federals were successful in driving the Confederates from the gap while inflicting heavy casualties, the first time any portion of Lee's army had been driven from the field up until this point in the war. Strategically, the Confederate force was able to stall the Federal advance for three hours despite being outnumbered nearly six to one. The delay was long enough to ensure the safety of McLaws on Maryland Heights and capture of Harpers Ferry the following morning.

More significantly, after seizing Crampton's Gap, General Franklin failed to attack McLaws and allowed Stonewall Jackson's Corps to reunite with the main body of the Confederate army at Sharpsburg without a fight, setting the stage for the Battle of Antietam three days later. There Lee hastily stood his ground in the war's bloodiest day. President Abraham Lincoln used the marginal Union victory at Antietam as a justification for announcing his Emancipation Proclamation.

== Preservation ==
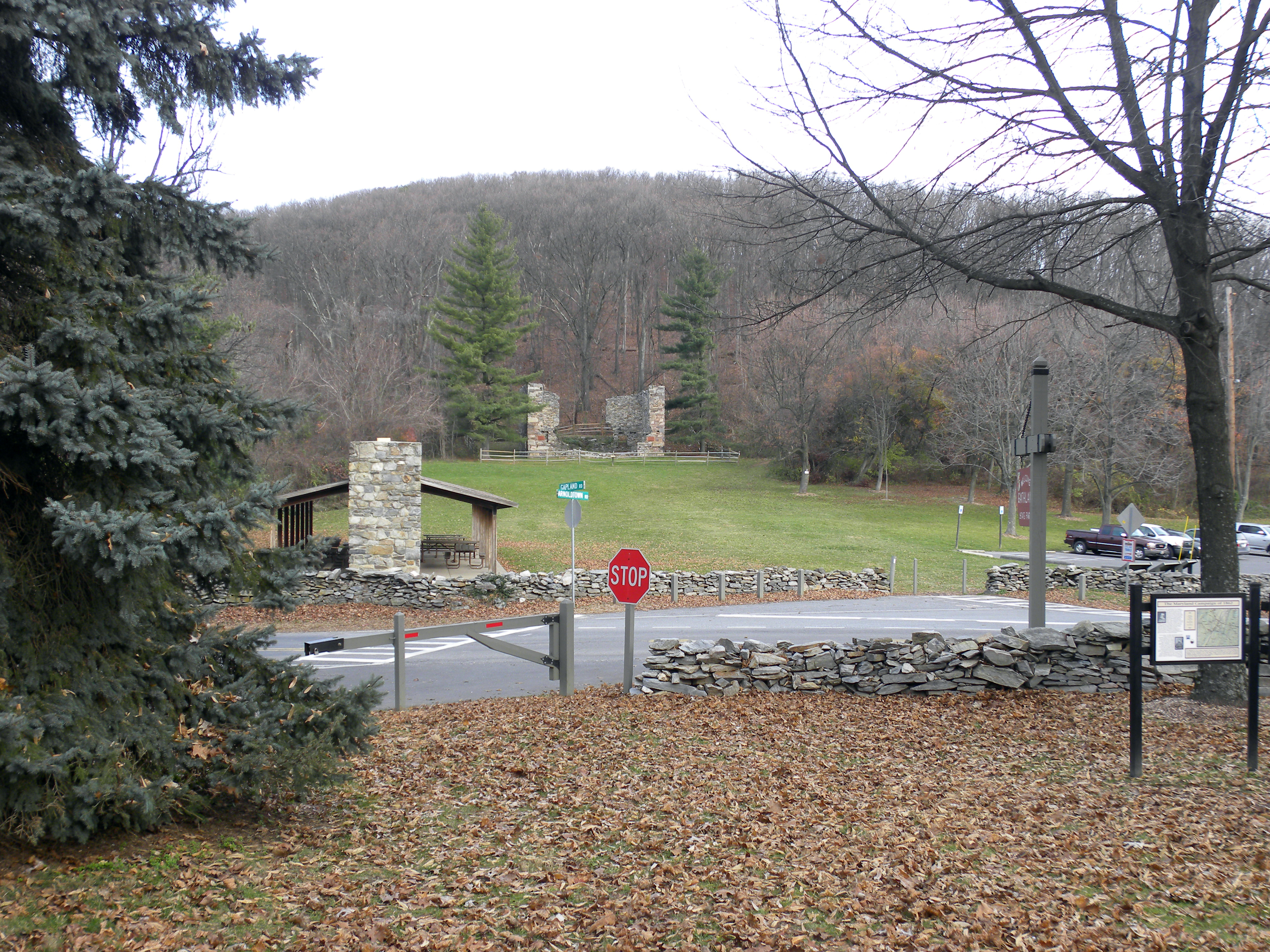
Crampton's Gap looking from the south side (Gathland State Park) to the north.

The battlefield and a large area to the east were designated a historic district on the National Register of Historic Places. The Crampton's Gap Historic District was designated on January 12, 2011, comprising the mountain around Crampton's Gap and Brownsville Gap, the town of Burkittsville, and surrounding landscape.
