= Gathland State Park =

State park in Maryland, United States

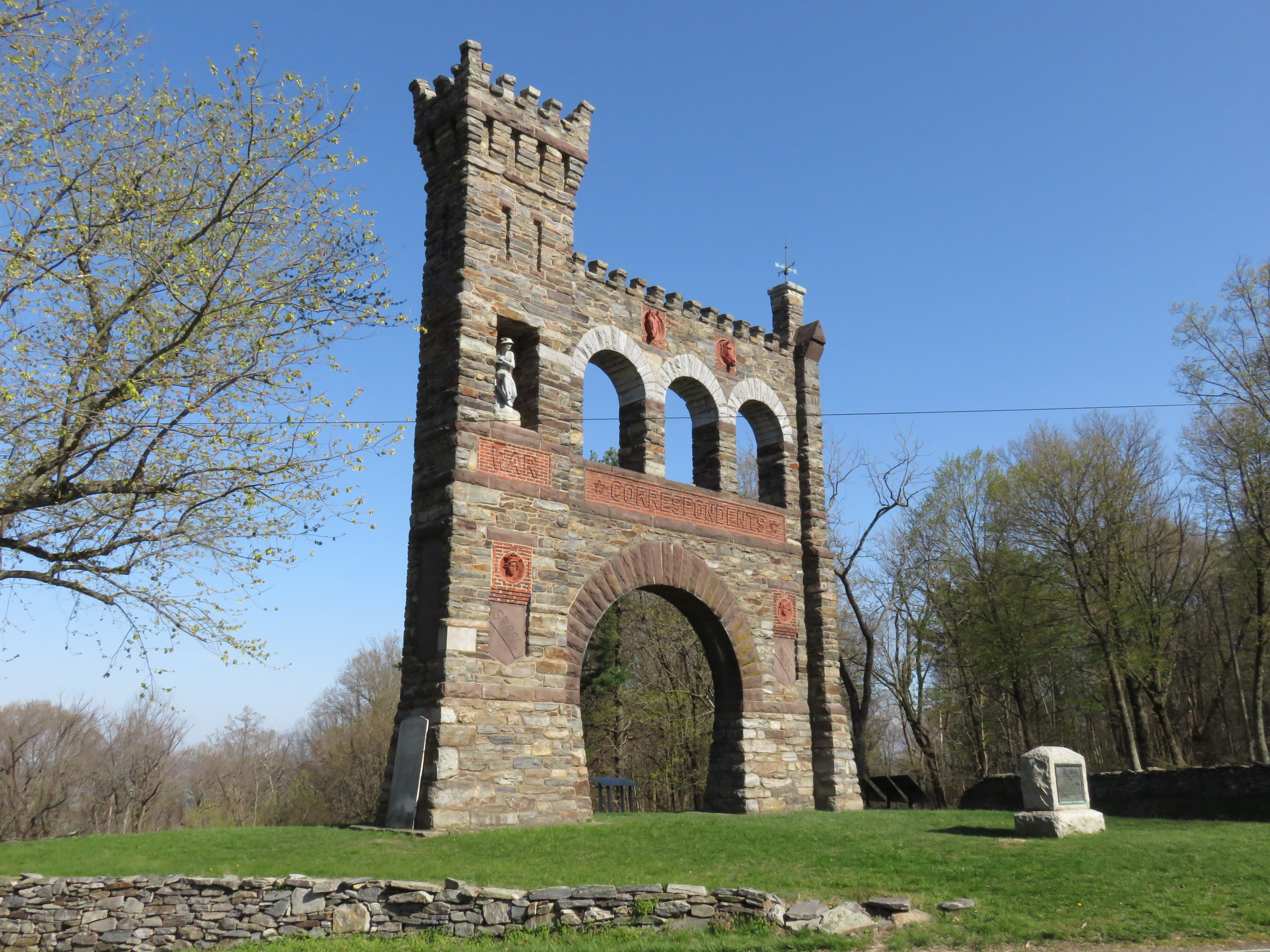
- The War Correspondents Memorial Arch at Gathland State Park

- Location within Maryland Location within the United States
- Location: Frederick and Washington counties, Maryland, United States
- Nearest town: Burkittsville, Maryland
- Coordinates: 39°24′20″N 77°38′22″W
- Area: 144 acres (58 ha)
- Elevation: 929 ft (283 m)
- Established: 1949
- Administrator: Maryland Department of Natural Resources
- Designation: Maryland state park
- Website: Official website

Gathland State Park is a Maryland state park located on South Mountain near Burkittsville, Maryland, in the United States. The park occupies the former estate of war correspondent George Alfred Townsend (1841-1914), who wrote under the pen name "Gath" during the American Civil War. The estate's few remaining original structures include the War Correspondents Memorial Arch, which sits alongside the Appalachian Trail. The park is operated by the Maryland Department of Natural Resources. The arch is a National Historic Monument maintained by the National Park Service.

== History ==
In 1884, Townsend acquired land in Crampton's Gap, the site of the Battle of Crampton's Gap and one of three gaps on South Mountain where the Battle of South Mountain had been fought between Union and Confederate forces in an early encounter in the Maryland Campaign. Townsend purchased the land as a retreat and immediately began designing the buildings that would become Gapland, his estate. His first project, Gapland Hall, an eleven-room house, was built in 1885. It was followed that year by Gapland Lodge, a stone servants' quarters. The large Den and Library Building with a study, library, and ten bedrooms was added in 1890; only its foundation and some fragments remain today. After Townsend's death, Gapland changed hands three times before being acquired by the Department of Forests and Parks and named as a state park in 1949.

== Features ==
Townsend's most famous and longest-lasting project was completed in 1896: the War Correspondents Memorial Arch. It was the first monument in the world dedicated to journalists killed in combat; several similarly dedicated memorials have been raised since.

Renovated in 1958, Gapland Hall is the park's visitors center and a museum for Townsend, while Gapland Lodge has a museum depicting the battle at Crampton's Gap, which was fought just before the battle at Antietam.

Visitors can also see the remnants of a mausoleum built for Townsend in 1895 but never used. Originally topped with the figure of a large bronze dog, only the chamber remains, the words "Good Night Gath" inscribed on its marble lintel.

The park also hosts Civil War encampments and interactive "living history" weekends that demonstrate life in the 19th century.
