= Special Order 191 =

1862 order issued by Confederate Gen. Robert E. Lee during the American Civil War

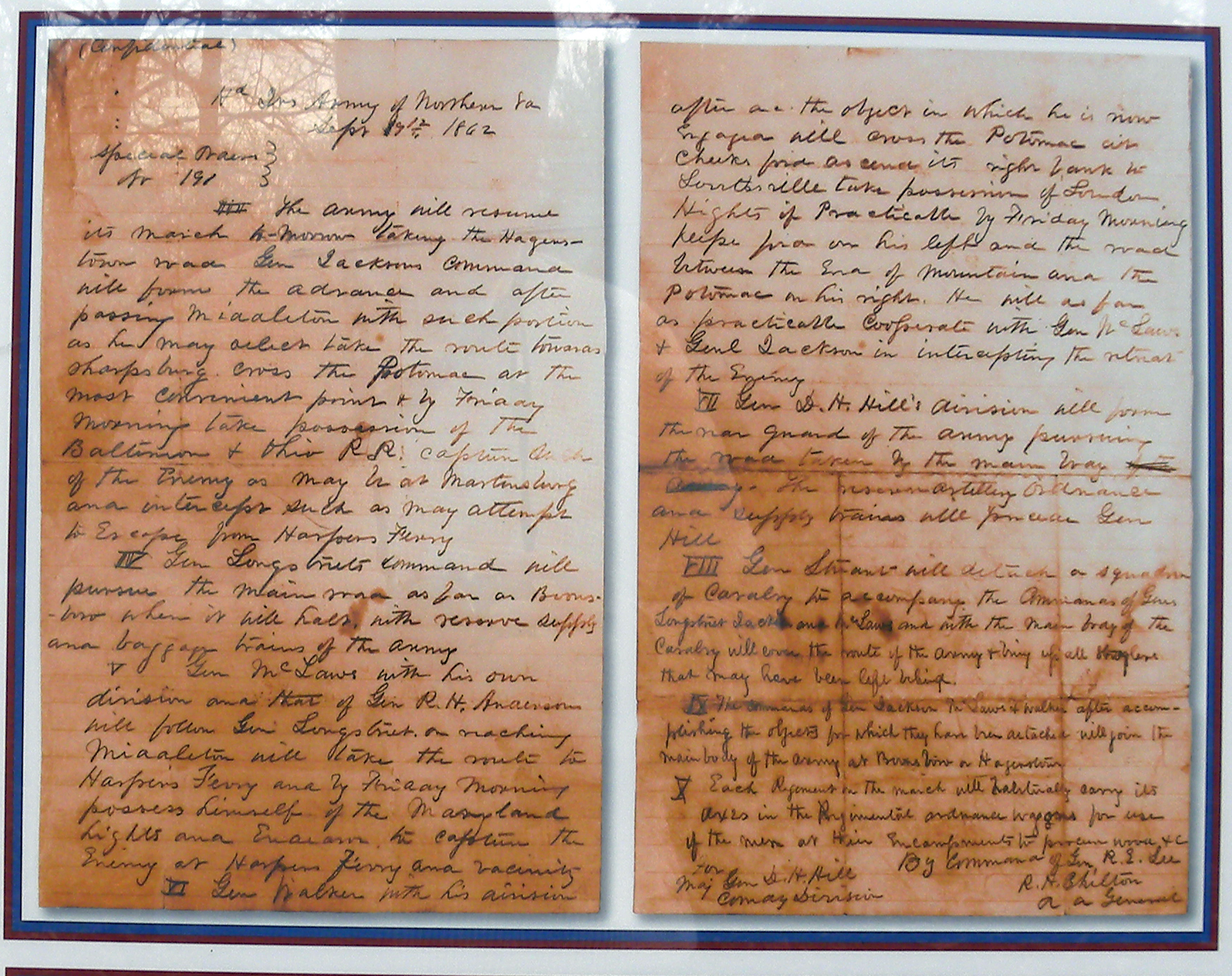
Copy of Lost Order displayed at Crampton's Gap, Maryland.

Special Order 191 (series 1862), also known as the "Lost Dispatch" and the "Lost Order", was a general movement order issued by Confederate Army General Robert E. Lee in September 1862, during the Maryland Campaign of the American Civil War. A discarded copy of this order was recovered several days later by Union Army troops in Frederick County, Maryland; it was passed to General George B. McClellan, who subsequently altered his own forces' movement and defeated Lee at the Battle of Antietam. Historians differ on how much the discovery contributed to McClellan's victory.

== History ==
=== Drafting ===
The order was drafted on or about September 9, 1862, during the Maryland Campaign. It gave details of the movements of the Army of Northern Virginia during the early days of its invasion of Maryland. Lee divided his army, which he planned to regroup later; according to the precise text, Major General Stonewall Jackson was to move his command to Martinsburg while Lafayette McLaws's command and John George Walker's command "endeavored to capture Harpers Ferry." Major General James Longstreet was to move his command northward to Boonsborough. Major General D. H. Hill's division was to act as rear guard on the march from Frederick.

Lee delineated the routes and roads to be taken and the timing for the investment of Harpers Ferry. On September 12th, from Hagerstown, Lee sent the original order of the 9th to President Davis. AAG Robert Chilton signed this document. Lee's staff officers, with the exception of Charles Venable, denied being involved in the promulgation of the Order. After the war, D.H. Hill produced a copy of the Order written in the hand of his brother-in-law, Stonewall Jackson. No other division commander produced a copy of the Order. Longstreet claimed, in 1895, that he ate his copy.

=== Union discovery of lost copy ===
About noon on September 13, Corporal Barton W. Mitchell of the 27th Indiana Volunteers, part of the Union XII Corps, discovered cigars wrapped in a piece of paper lying in the grass at a campground. Mitchell realized the significance of the document and turned it in to Sergeant John M. Bloss. They went to their regimental commander Colonel Silas Colgrove, who carried it to the corps headquarters. There, an aide named Samuel Pitman claimed he recognized the signature on the document as that of Robert Chilton, Confederate AAG. The 12th Corps commander, Alpheus S. Williams, sent the document to McClellan who read it.

McClellan was overcome with glee at learning planned Confederate troop movements and reportedly exclaimed, "Now I know what to do!" He confided to Brigadier General John Gibbon, "Here is a paper with which, if I cannot whip Bobby Lee, I will be willing to go home."

=== Effect ===
In a letter written to D.H. Hill, in 1868, Lee stated that he learned McClellan had read the Order from Stuart the night of September 13th, Stuart reporting that a "Citizen of Maryland" had arrived at Boonsboro with the news. Two Northern newspapers reported no later than September 15 that Union officers had Lee's orders. Indeed, on the morning of September 15, 1862, the New York Herald, the North’s biggest newspaper, printed the following bulletin on the right-hand column on its front page:

WASHINGTON, Sept. 14, 1862 Officers who left Frederick this morning report that a general order of General Lee was found there, directing that two columns of the rebel army should proceed by way of Middletown, one of them destined for Greencastle, Pa., with all possible expedition, and the other to proceed by way of Williamsport or Shepherdstown, at discretion, to engage the Union forces at Harper's Ferrry. [sic]

The reasons this was both printed and overlooked are explored here.

McClellan stopped Lee's invasion at the subsequent Battle of Antietam, but many military historians believe he failed to fully exploit the strategic advantage of the intelligence because he was concerned about a possible trap (Major General Henry W. Halleck had been concerned that "Lee might draw McClellan and the army away from Washington, then turn and attack the city") or gross overestimation of the strength of Lee's army.

=== Legacy ===
Where the lost order was discovered is not exactly known, but its general location is where today a quarry exists on the outskirts of Frederick, Maryland, A historical marker on the Monocacy National Battlefield commemorates the finding of Special Order 191 during the Maryland Campaign.

Corporal Mitchell, who found the orders, was subsequently wounded in the leg at Antietam and was discharged in 1864 due to the resulting chronic infection. He died in 1868 at the age of 52.

== Purported Original Copies of Special Orders, No. 191 from 1862 ==
There are four documents that contain the text of Lee's Order of the 9th: The original document signed by Chilton and sent to President Davis on September 12, 1862; The text as copied by A.P. Mason into Chilton's letter book; the text as written by Stonewall Jackson and delivered at some place and time to D.H. Hill; the copy of the Order held by the Library of Congress, as part of the McClellan Papers written in an unknown hand.#Full order in the Army of Northern Virginia Special Order Book at the National Archives. (also with pages extracted to a separate file at the National Archives)

1. Union Gen. George B. McClellan's copy of a portion of the order (i.e., the "lost" version) from McClellan's personal documents deposited with the Library of Congress.
2. Confederate Gen. D. H. Hill's copy of a portion of the order (purportedly written by Stonewall Jackson) at the Library of the University of North Carolina.

== Special Orders, No. 191 ==
Special Orders, No. 191
Hdqrs. Army of Northern Virginia
September 9, 1862

3. The army will resume its march tomorrow, taking the Hagerstown road. General Jackson's command will form the advance, and, after passing Middletown, with such portion as he may select, take the route toward Sharpsburg, cross the Potomac at the most convenient point, and by Friday morning take possession of the Baltimore and Ohio Railroad, capture such of them as may be at Martinsburg, and intercept such as may attempt to escape from Harpers Ferry.

4. General Longstreet's command will pursue the same road as far as Boonsborough, where it will halt, with reserve, supply, and baggage trains of the army.

5. General McLaws, with his own division and that of General R. H. Anderson, will follow General Longstreet. On reaching Middletown will take the route to Harpers Ferry, and by Friday morning possess himself of the Maryland Heights and endeavor to capture the enemy at Harpers Ferry and vicinity.

6. General Walker, with his division, after accomplishing the object in which he is now engaged, will cross the Potomac at Cheek's Ford, ascend its right bank to Lovettsville, take possession of Loudoun Heights, if practicable, by Friday morning, Key's Ford on his left, and the road between the end of the mountain and the Potomac on his right. He will, as far as practicable, cooperate with General McLaws and Jackson, and intercept retreat of the enemy.

7. General D. H. Hill's division will form the rear guard of the army, pursuing the road taken by the main body. The reserve artillery, ordnance, and supply trains, &c., will precede General Hill.

8.General Stuart will detach a squadron of cavalry to accompany the commands of Generals Longstreet, Jackson, and McLaws, and, with the main body of the cavalry, will cover the route of the army, bringing up all stragglers that may have been left behind.

9.The commands of Generals Jackson, McLaws, and Walker, after accomplishing the objects for which they have been detached, will join the main body of the army at Boonsborough or Hagerstown.

10.Each regiment on the march will habitually carry its axes in the regimental ordnance—wagons, for use of the men at their encampments, to procure wood &c.

By command of General R. E. Lee
Assistant Adjutant General
