= Jesse L. Reno =

United States Army general (1823–1862)

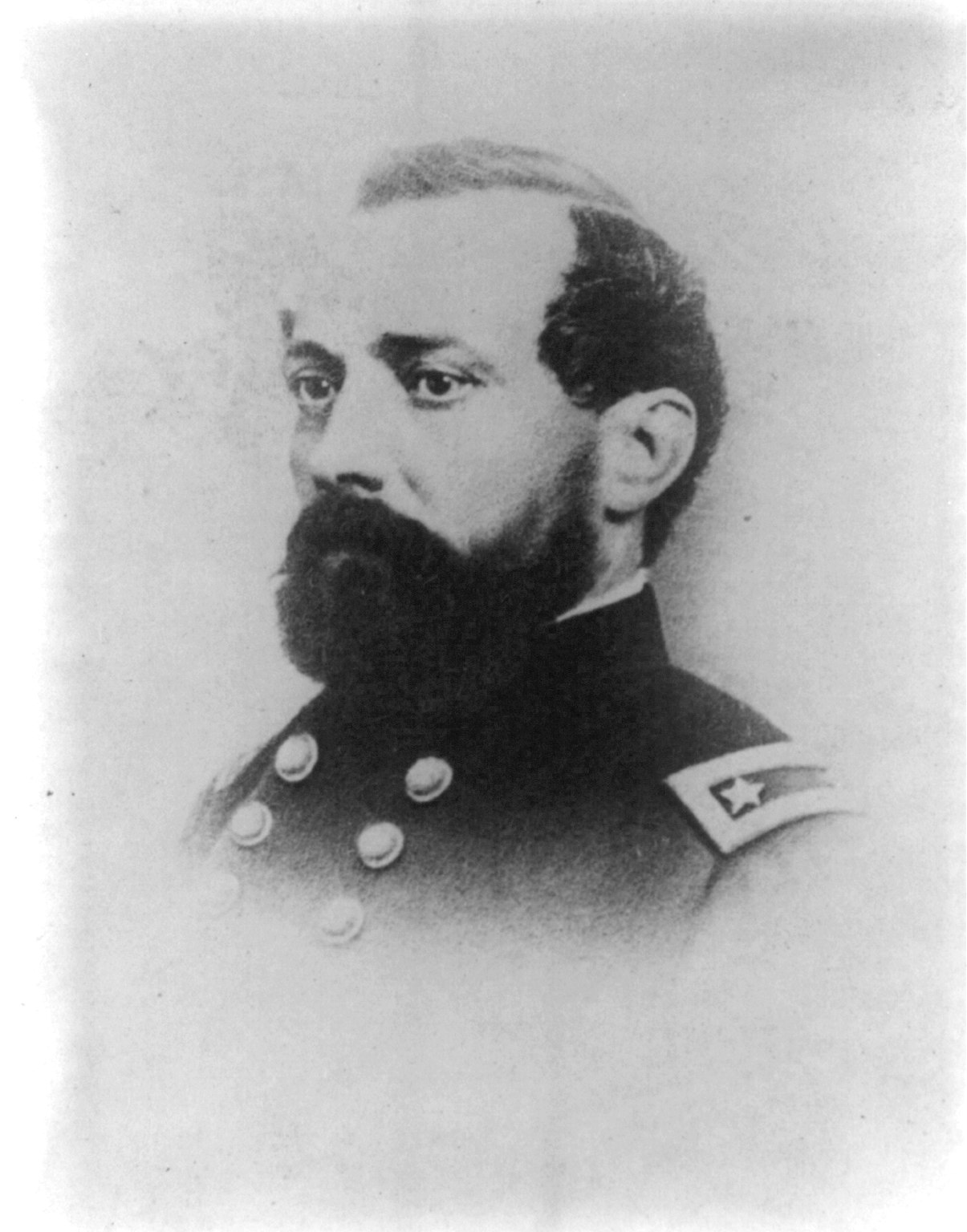
- Reno, 1842
- Born: Jesse Lee Reno; April 20, 1823; Wheeling, Virginia (now West Virginia), U.S.
- Died: September 14, 1862 (aged 39) near Boonsboro, Maryland, U.S.
- Burial place: Oak Hill Cemetery, Washington, D.C., U.S.
- Military career
- Allegiance: United States, Union
- Branch: United States Army; Union Army
- Service years: 1846–1862
- Rank: Major General
- Commands: Mount Vernon Arsenal, IX Corps
- Conflicts: Mexican–American War; American Civil War; Burnside's North Carolina Expedition; Battle of Roanoke Island; Battle of New Bern; Battle of South Mills; Northern Virginia Campaign; Maryland Campaign; Battle of South Mountain †

Jesse Lee Reno (April 20, 1823 – September 14, 1862) was a career United States Army officer who served in the Mexican–American War, in the Utah War, on the western frontier and as a Union General during the American Civil War from West Virginia. Known as a "soldier's soldier" who fought alongside his men, he was killed while commanding a corps at Fox's Gap during the Battle of South Mountain. Reno, Nevada; Reno County, Kansas; Reno, Ohio; El Reno, Oklahoma; Reno, Pennsylvania; Fort Reno in Oklahoma; and Fort Reno Park in Washington, D.C. were named after him.

== Early life ==
Reno was born in Wheeling, Virginia (now West Virginia), the third-oldest of eight children of Lewis Thomas and Rebecca (Quinby) Reno. His Huguenot ancestors changed the spelling of their surname from "Reynaud" to the more Anglicized "Reno" when they arrived near Richmond, Virginia] from France in 1770,.

His family moved to the Franklin, Pennsylvania, area in 1830, and Reno spent his childhood there.

Reno was admitted to the United States Military Academy in 1842 and graduated eighth in his class of 59 cadets in 1846, initially commissioned a brevet second lieutenant of Ordnance. Reno and Thomas J. "Stonewall" Jackson became close friends while at West Point. Other classmates and friends included George B. McClellan, George Pickett, Darius N. Couch, A. P. Hill, and George Stoneman.

Reno married Mary Cross Reno on November 1, 1853. The couple had five children, including Conrad Reno and Jesse W. Reno (the man who invented the first working escalator).

== Mexican–American War ==
During the Mexican–American War in 1847, Reno commanded an artillery battery under General Winfield Scott and fought in the Siege of Vera Cruz and other battles in Mexico. Reno was brevetted twice during the war—once for "gallant and meritorious conduct" at the Battle of Cerro Gordo, and later for bravery at the Battle for Mexico City and the Battle of Chapultepec, where he was seriously wounded while commanding a howitzer battery. During the occupation of Mexico City, Reno became an original member of the Aztec Club of 1847.

After the Mexican–American War ended, Reno served in several locations, including as a mathematics instructor at West Point, as the secretary of a group assigned to "create a system of instruction for heavy artillery", and at the Ordnance Board in Washington, D.C. He was promoted to first lieutenant, in 1853, and sent to conduct a road survey from the Big Sioux River to Mendota, Minnesota. When he returned to Washington, he married Mary Blanes Cross, and the couple had five children, two of whom had notable achievements of their own: Conrad Reno became an attorney and writer of note in Boston, Massachusetts, and Jesse W. Reno graduated from Lehigh University and invented the first working escalator.

Reno's next assignment was as ordnance officer at the Frankford Arsenal, northeast of Philadelphia, where he spent the next few years. In 1857, Reno was assigned to go with Brigadier General Albert Sydney Johnston (later a senior Confederate general in the Western Theater) as chief of ordnance on a two-year expedition to the Utah Territory.

== Civil War ==
When he returned from Utah in 1859, Reno was promoted to captain after fourteen years of continuous service in the Army. Captain Reno then took command of the Mount Vernon Arsenal near Mount Vernon, Alabama, in 1859. At dawn on January 4, 1861, Reno was forced to surrender the arsenal to troops from Alabama, a bloodless transfer ordered by the governor of Alabama, Andrew B. Moore. Alabama seceded from the Union a week later.

Upon leaving Alabama with his small force, Reno was temporarily assigned to command the Fort Leavenworth Arsenal until he was appointed brigadier general of volunteers in the fall of 1861. He transferred to Virginia, took command of the 2nd Brigade, Burnside Expeditionary Force, and soon had organized five regiments. The 2nd Brigade fought in Major General Ambrose Burnside's North Carolina Expedition from February through July 1862. Reno became a division commander in the IX Corps, which had become part of the Army of the Potomac. In the Northern Virginia Campaign, Reno actively opposed his friend and classmate Stonewall Jackson during the Second Battle of Bull Run and the Battle of Chantilly. Reno was appointed a major general on August 20, 1862. (This promotion was confirmed posthumously on March 9, 1863, with date of rank established as July 18, 1862.) Burnside became commander of the Army of the Potomac's right wing for the start of the Maryland Campaign in September, elevating Reno to command of the IX Corps from September 3.

Reno had a reputation as a "soldier's soldier" and often was right beside his troops without a sword or any sign of rank. On September 12, 1862, Reno's IX Corps spent the day in Frederick, Maryland, as the Army of the Potomac under Major General George McClellan advanced westward in pursuit of the Confederate Army of Northern Virginia under Gen. Robert E. Lee. Elements of Lee's army defended three low-lying "gaps" of South Mountain—Crampton's, Turner's, and Fox's—while concentrating at Sharpsburg, Maryland, to the west, the location of the subsequent Battle of Antietam (September 17, 1862). In the Battle of South Mountain on September 14, Reno stopped directly in front of his troops as he reconnoitered the enemy's forces advancing up the road at Fox's Gap. He was shot in the chest by a rookie Union soldier from the 35th Massachusetts who mistook him for Confederate cavalry at dusk. The manuscript of Union Officer Ezra A. Carman, published in The Maryland Campaign of September 1862, Volume 1: South Mountain, Edited and annotated by Thomas G. Clemens, documents Reno's death by men of General John Bell Hood who were in the treeline and fired from the woods that the 35th Massachusetts skirmishers had just retreated from.

He was brought by stretcher to Brigadier General Samuel D. Sturgis's command post and said in a clear voice, "Hallo, Sam, I'm dead!" Sturgis, a long-time acquaintance and fellow member of the West Point Class of 1846, thought that he sounded so natural that he must be joking and told Reno that he hoped it was not as bad as all that. Reno repeated, "Yes, yes, I'm dead—good-by!", dying a few minutes later. In his official report, Confederate general Daniel Harvey Hill sarcastically remarked, "The Yankees on their side lost General Reno, a renegade Virginian, who was killed by a happy shot from the Twenty-third North Carolina."

== Legacy ==
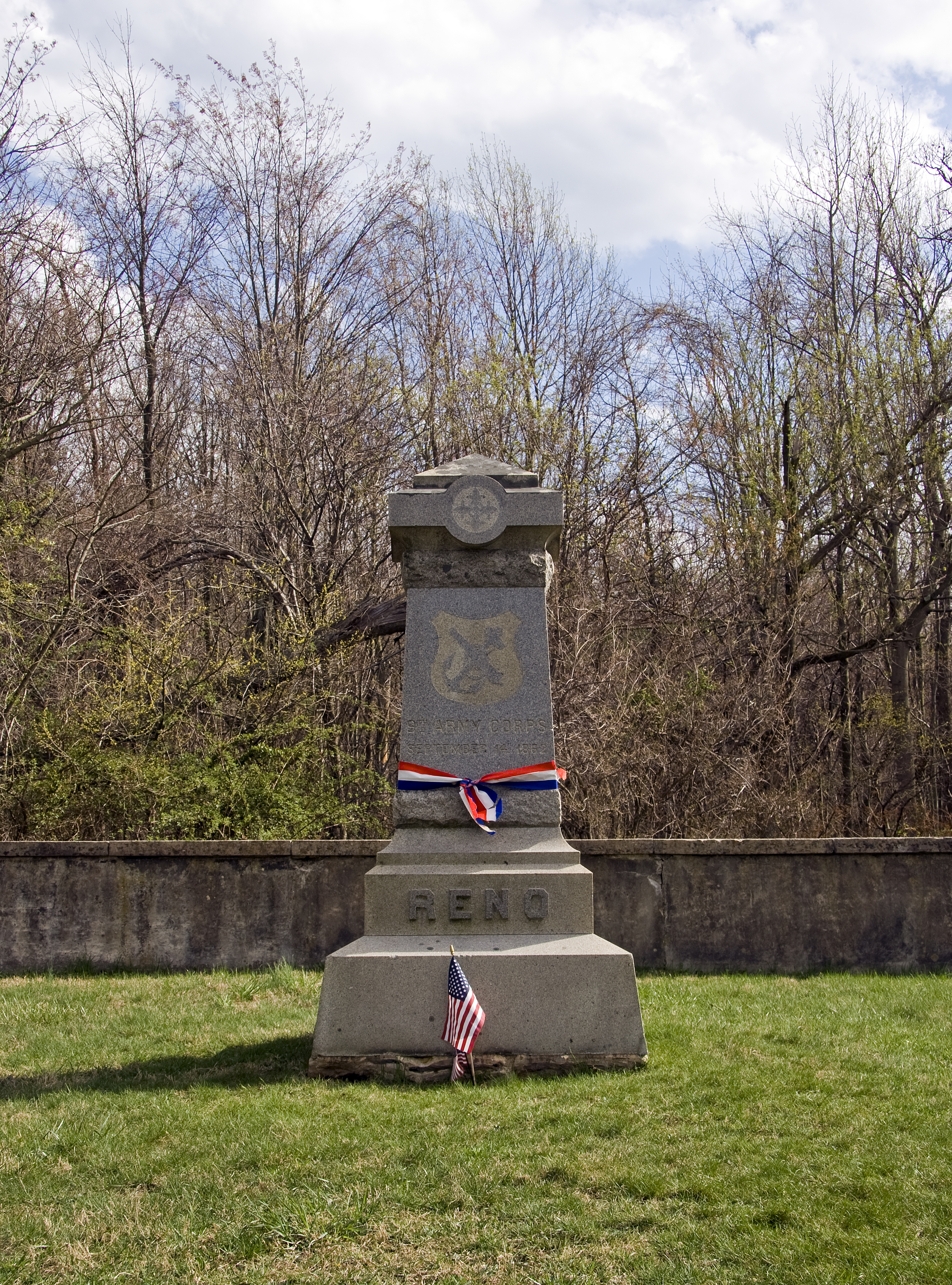
Reno Monument at Fox's Gap, South Mountain Battlefield

Reno's body was first taken to Boston, the home of his wife, and placed in a vault in Trinity Church. On April 9, 1867, his remains were reinterred in Oak Hill Cemetery in Georgetown, Washington, D.C.

A memorial marking the location of his death was erected in 1889 by IX Corps veterans on present-day Reno Monument Road in Fox's Gap at the South Mountain State Battlefield Park. A monument for Confederate Brig. Gen. Samuel L. Garland, Jr. of Virginia also killed near here was erected nearby in 1993 by the Sons of Confederate Veterans and the Central Maryland Heritage League along with a large stone and bronze sculpture to North Carolina soldiers defending the line in 2005.

The cities of Reno, Nevada, Reno, Ohio, El Reno, Oklahoma, and Reno, Pennsylvania, are all named for the general. The first two contain monuments to him in their downtown areas. The one in Reno stands along Virginia Street; the one in El Reno stands in Youngheim Plaza on Russell Street.

The United States Army named three outposts after Reno: Fort Pennsylvania in present-day Washington, D.C., was renamed Fort Reno in 1862, Fort Reno was constructed near present-day El Reno, Oklahoma in 1874, the third Fort Reno was built in present-day Wyoming on the Bozeman Trail in 1865.

Reno County, Kansas is also named in his honor.

The Jesse L. Reno School in Washington, DC was named in his honor. It closed in 1950.

== See also ==
- List of American Civil War generals (Union)
