= Jesse W. Reno =

American inventor (1861-1947)

- Born: Jesse Wilford Reno; August 4, 1861; Fort Leavenworth, Kansas, U.S.
- Died: June 2, 1947 (aged 85); Pelham Manor, New York, U.S.
- Resting place: Oak Hill Cemetery
- Education: Lehigh University (BS)
- Occupations: Inventor; engineer
- Spouse: Baroness Marie G. Snowman
- Parents: Jesse L. Reno (father); Mary Blanes Cross (mother)

Jesse Wilford Reno (August 4, 1861 – June 2, 1947) was an American inventor and engineer. He invented the first working escalator in 1891 (patented March 15, 1892) used at the Old Iron Pier, Coney Island, New York City. His invention was referred to as the "inclined elevator." An earlier escalator machine, termed "revolving stairs" by its inventor Nathan Ames, was patented March 9, 1859, but was never built.

Reno was born in 1861 in Fort Leavenworth, Kansas. He was the son of American Civil War notable Jesse L. Reno. He graduated from Lehigh University in 1883 with an engineering degree in mining, later a metallurgical degree, where he was a member of Chi Phi fraternity.

Reno was buried in Oak Hill Cemetery.

It has been said that Reno's inspiration for the escalator stemmed from his time as an undergraduate. Not only does Lehigh's campus feature the highest residence hall east of the Mississippi, but also there are approximately three hundred stairs that must be climbed to ascend 100+ meters from the lowest point on campus to the Chi Phi fraternity house on South Mountain.
