= John Garland (general) =

American general (1793–1861)

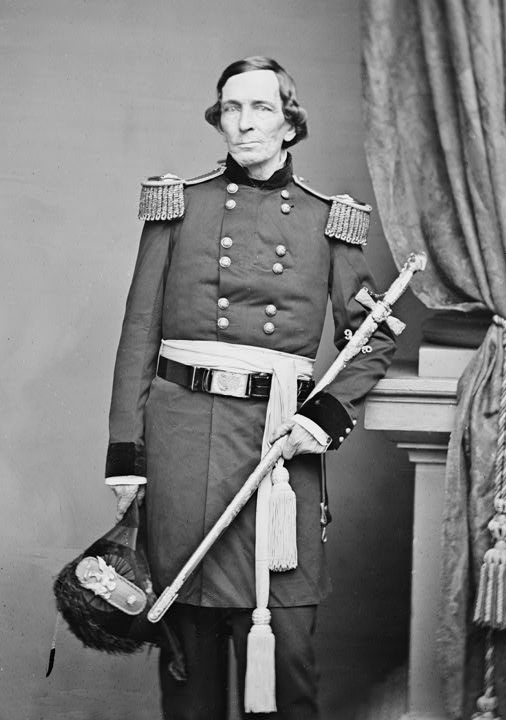
- Born: November 15, 1793; Virginia
- Died: June 5, 1861 (aged 67); New York City, New York, U.S.
- Burial place: Oak Hill Cemetery; Georgetown, Washington, D.C.
- Relatives: Samuel Garland, Jr. (nephew); William Penn (great-grandnephew)
- Military career
- Allegiance: United States of America; Union
- Branch: United States Army; Union Army
- Service years: 1813–1861
- Rank: Colonel; Bvt. Brigadier General
- Commands: 8th U.S. Infantry
- Conflicts: War of 1812; Seminole Wars; Mexican–American War; Battle of Palo Alto; Battle of Resaca de la Palma; Battle of Monterrey; Siege of Vera Cruz; Battle of Cerro Gordo; Battle of Contreras; Battle of Churubusco; Battle of Molino del Rey; Battle of Chapultepec; American Civil War

John Garland (November 15, 1793 – June 5, 1861) was an American general in the Regular Army who had a long and distinguished career spanning fifty years of service during the War of 1812, Seminole Wars, Mexican–American War, Utah War and very briefly into the American Civil War.

== Early life and career ==
Garland was born in Virginia to Hudson Martin and Elizabeth Penn (née Phillips) Garland. His mother was the grandniece of William Penn. One of his brothers was James Garland. He joined the U.S. Army during the War of 1812 and by 1813 was a first lieutenant. He served throughout the war in the 35th Infantry and was transferred to the 3rd Infantry at the war's close. He stayed in the army serving in the quartermaster's department. He fought under General William J. Worth in the Seminole Wars in northern and central Florida.

== Mexico ==
=== Northern Mexico ===
Garland was promoted to lieutenant colonel of the 4th U.S. Infantry on May 7, 1839. He fought under Zachary Taylor at the battles of Palo Alto and Resaca de la Palma. During this time he commanded a second lieutenant U.S. Grant. For services in these two battles, he was brevetted to full colonel and commanded a brigade of regulars in David E. Twiggs' division of the Army of Occupation. At the Battle of Monterrey, Garland temporarily led the division in the initial attack on the city as General Twiggs had taken an overdose of a laxative before the battle.

=== Central Mexico ===
Garland joined Winfield Scott's army and, for the second time in his career, he was serving under William Worth, who was now his division commander. Garland fought at the battles of Veracruz, Battle of Cerro Gordo, Contreras and Churubusco. For his distinguished services in the last two battles, he was appointed brevet brigadier general of regulars. He led his brigade at the Battle of Molino del Rey and in the attack on Chapultepec. He had survived the war thus far without any serious injury, but when he marched his brigade into fallen Mexico City, he was hit in the chest by a Mexican sharpshooter and severely wounded.

== Utah War and Civil War ==
He recovered and returned to duty in the army, being made colonel of the 8th U.S. Infantry in May 1849. In 1848 James Longstreet married Garland's daughter and named his firstborn son John Garland Longstreet in honor of his father-in-law. Garland was in command of a military district that dealt with the Utah War in 1857–58. He was still on active duty in the Regular Army when the American Civil War broke out in 1861. He stayed loyal to the Union, despite being from Virginia and his close ties with James Longstreet, who soon became a prominent Confederate general. His services to the North were short lived however, as he died on June 5, 1861, in New York City while still on active duty.

Garland was interred at Oak Hill Cemetery in Washington, D.C.

His nephew, Samuel Garland, Jr., served as a Confederate general and was killed at the Battle of South Mountain in 1862.

== Honors ==
Fort Garland in Colorado was named for him.
