= Fox's Gap =

Wind gap in Blue Ridge Mountains

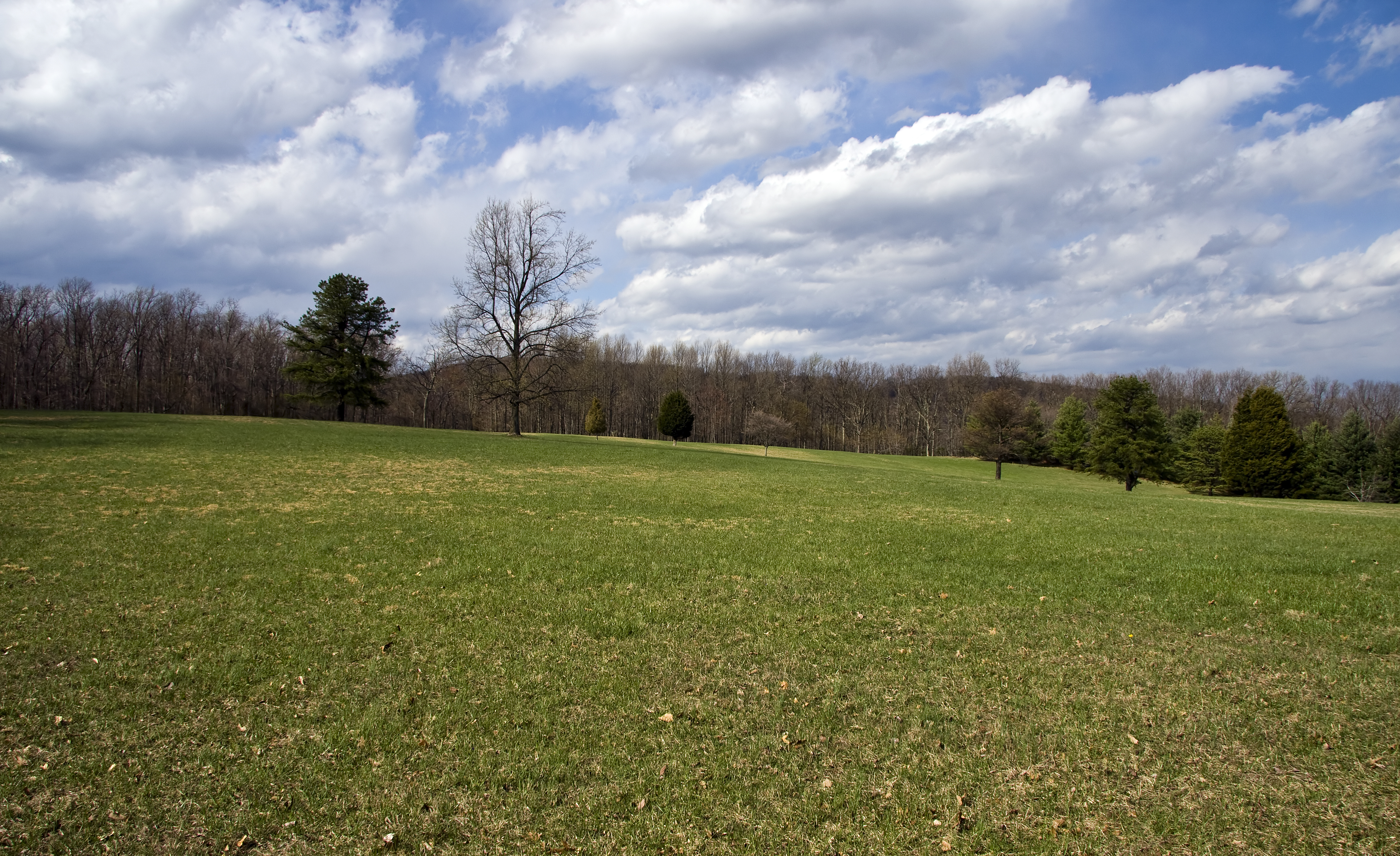
- Fox's Gap looking northeast towards Turner's Gap

- Location within Maryland
- Elevation: 1,060 ft (320 m)

Third Approach
- Location: Maryland, United States
- Range: Blue Ridge Mountains; South Mountain
- Coordinates: 39°28′15″N 77°37′02″W

Fox's Gap, also known as Fox Gap, is a wind gap in the South Mountain Range of the Blue Ridge Mountains, located in Frederick County and Washington County, Maryland. The gap is traversed by Reno Monument Road. The Appalachian Trail also crosses the gap along the ridgeline.

== Geography ==
The gap is about 200 feet (61 m) below the ridge line to the north, 400 feet (120 m) below the ridge line to the south and about 400 feet (120 m) above the surrounding lowlands. To the east of the gap lies the Middletown Valley and to the west the Hagerstown Valley. Turner's Gap is 1 mile (1.6 km) to the north, while Lambs Knoll is immediately to the south.

== History ==
The area was settled in early 1751 by the John and Christiana Fox family and their son Frederick, German immigrants from Hesse. Frederick assembled adjoining lands which eventually extended to Turner's Gap. The area is first mentioned as "Foxes Gap" in a September 10, 1792, letter. Frederick Fox moved to Ohio in the early 1800s after the death of his wife. Fox's gap was in use by Euromerican colonists for decades before anyone settled there on the slopes of the mountain or gave it a lasting name. This was the original, early route of what would be known as The Great Philadelphia Wagon Road. John MacGruder's 1732 patent along Catoctin Creek is described as “about 1/2 mile above the wagon road that goes from Connestoga to Opeckon” indicating the road being well established by that early date. The main migration wagon road would eventually be relocated to the center of the valley, but the Middletown to Sharpsburg route would remain in use as a local road over essentially the same roadbeds from the 1730s until present. General Braddock, George Washington, and Dunbar's Regiment went through Fox's Gap during May 1755 in the Braddock Expedition and their attempt to capture Fort Duquesne.

The Daniel Wise family bought a portion of the property in 1858 for $46.96, clearing fields and building a log cabin. The Wise House was demolished in 1919. On September 14, 1862, the area was the scene some of the heaviest engagements of the Battle of South Mountain. The Reno Monument erected in 1889 by fellow soldiers at the top of Fox's Gap along Reno Monument Road commemorates the death of Union general Jesse L. Reno. Another monument has been erected nearby in the 1990s, which commemorates also the death of Confederate Brig. General Samuel Garland, Jr. and about a half-mile south is a bronze sculpture on a granite stone base dedicated in 2003 to remember the North Carolina troops that held the line here.

The area is listed on the National Register of Historic Places as part of the Turner's and Fox's Gaps Historic District.

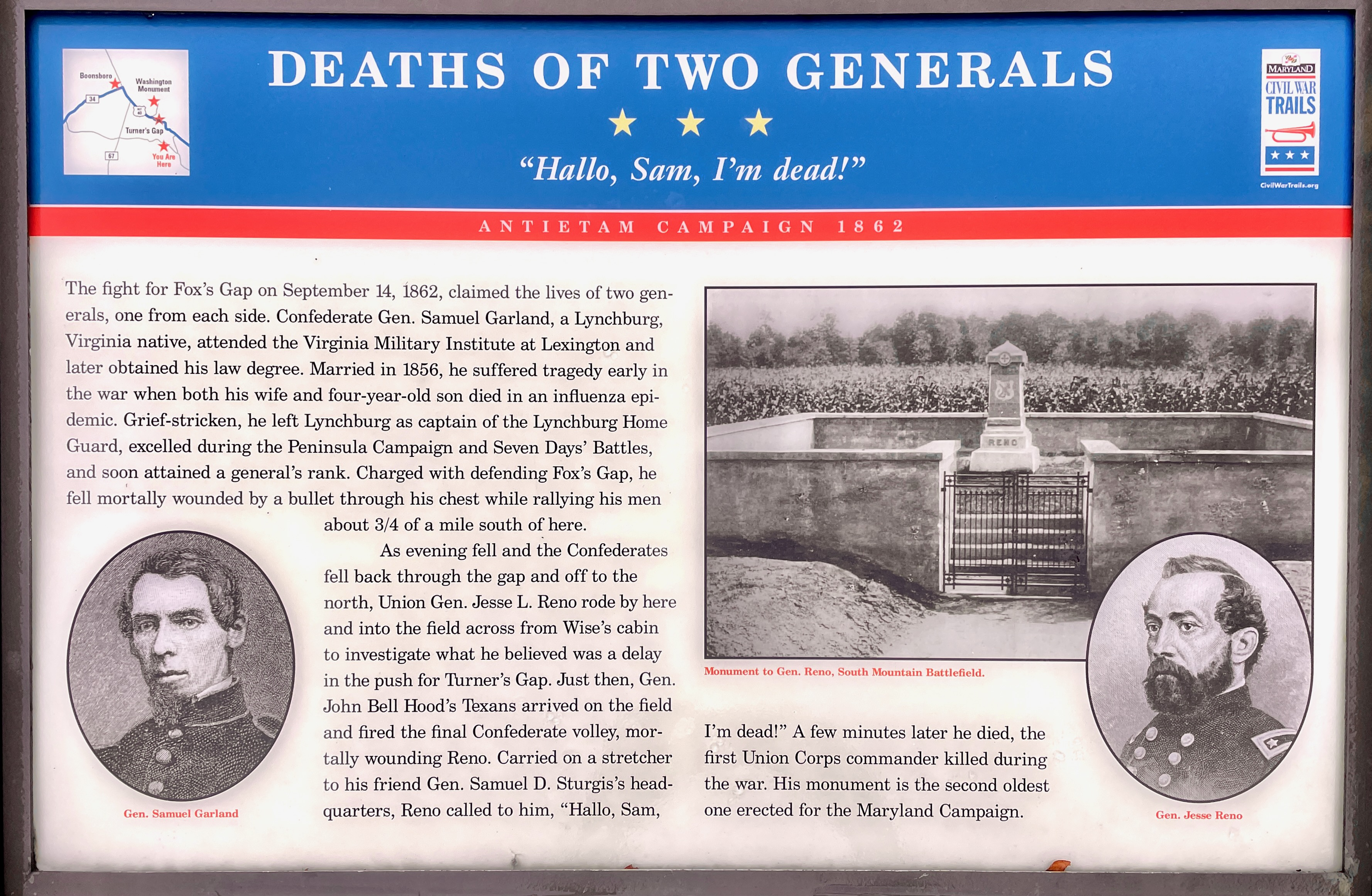
Civil War Trails – Deaths of Two Generals

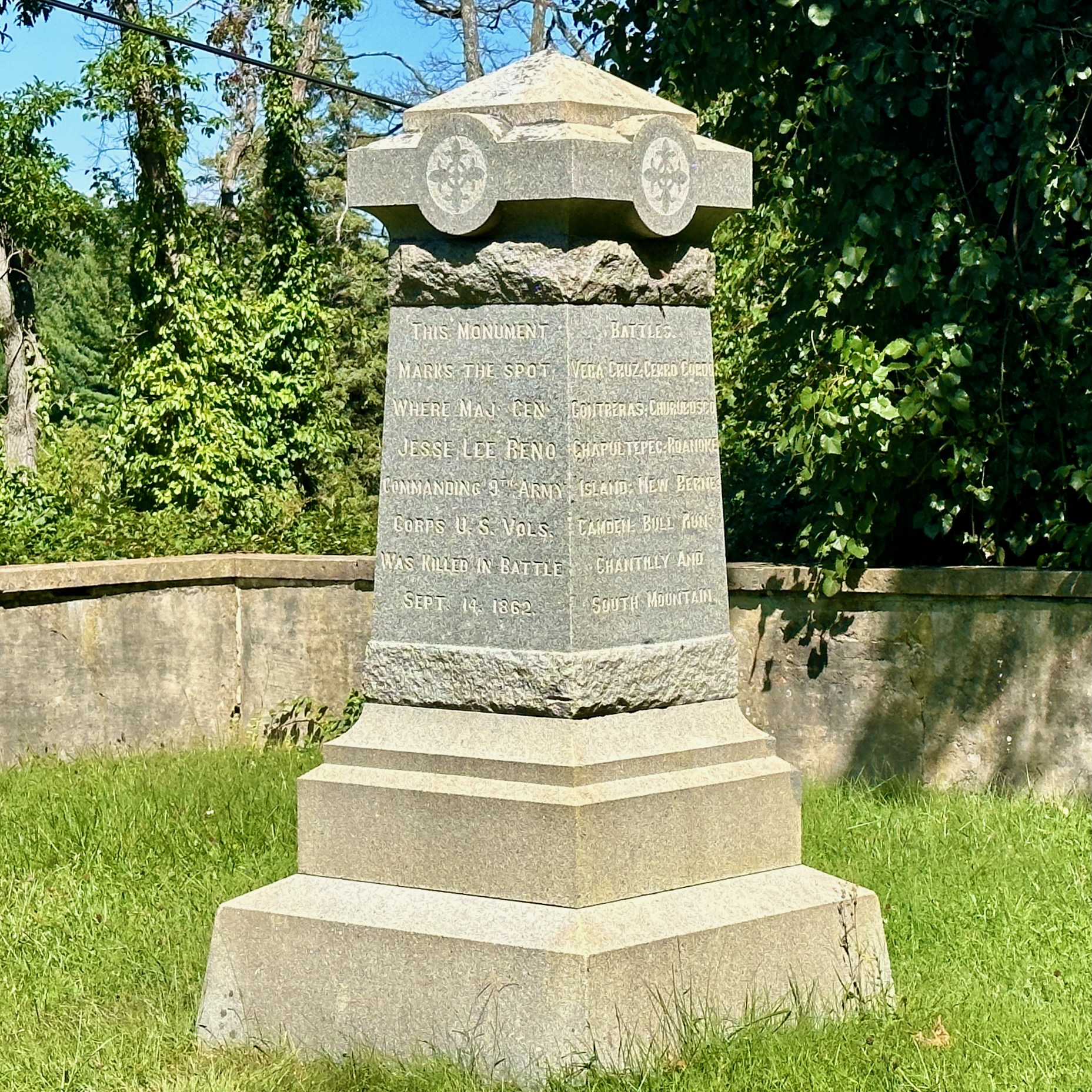
Reno Monument

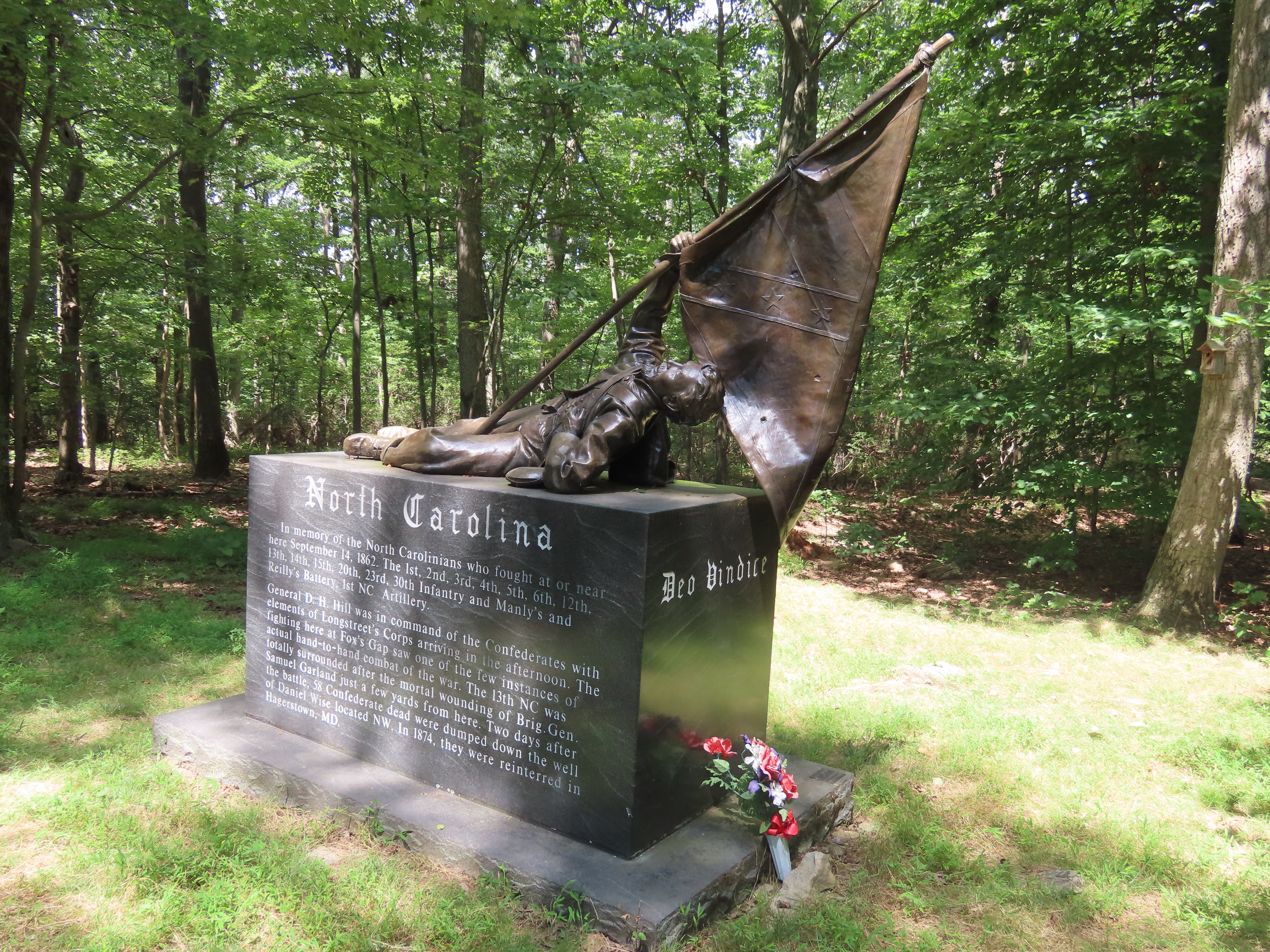
North Carolina Memorial at Fox's Gap (2003)
