= Turner's Gap =

Wind gap in Maryland, United States

- Looking east across the Middletown Valley at Catoctin Mountain from Turners Gap
- Interactive map of Turner's Gap
- Elevation: 1,070 ft (330 m)
- Traversed by: U.S. Route 40 Alt.

Third Approach
- Location: Maryland, United States
- Range: Blue Ridge Mountains; South Mountain
- Coordinates: 39°29′05″N 77°37′13″W

Turner's Gap is a wind gap in the South Mountain Range of the Blue Ridge Mountains, located in Frederick County and Washington County, Maryland. The gap is traversed by U.S. Route 40 Alternate, the old National Pike. The Appalachian Trail also crosses the gap along the ridgeline.

== Geography ==
The gap is 200 feet (61 m) below the ridgeline to the south, 400 feet (120 m) below the ridgeline to the south and 400 feet (120 m) above the surrounding lowlands. To the east of the gap lies the Middletown Valley and to the west the Hagerstown Valley. Fox's Gap is 1 mile (1.6 km) to the south.

== History ==
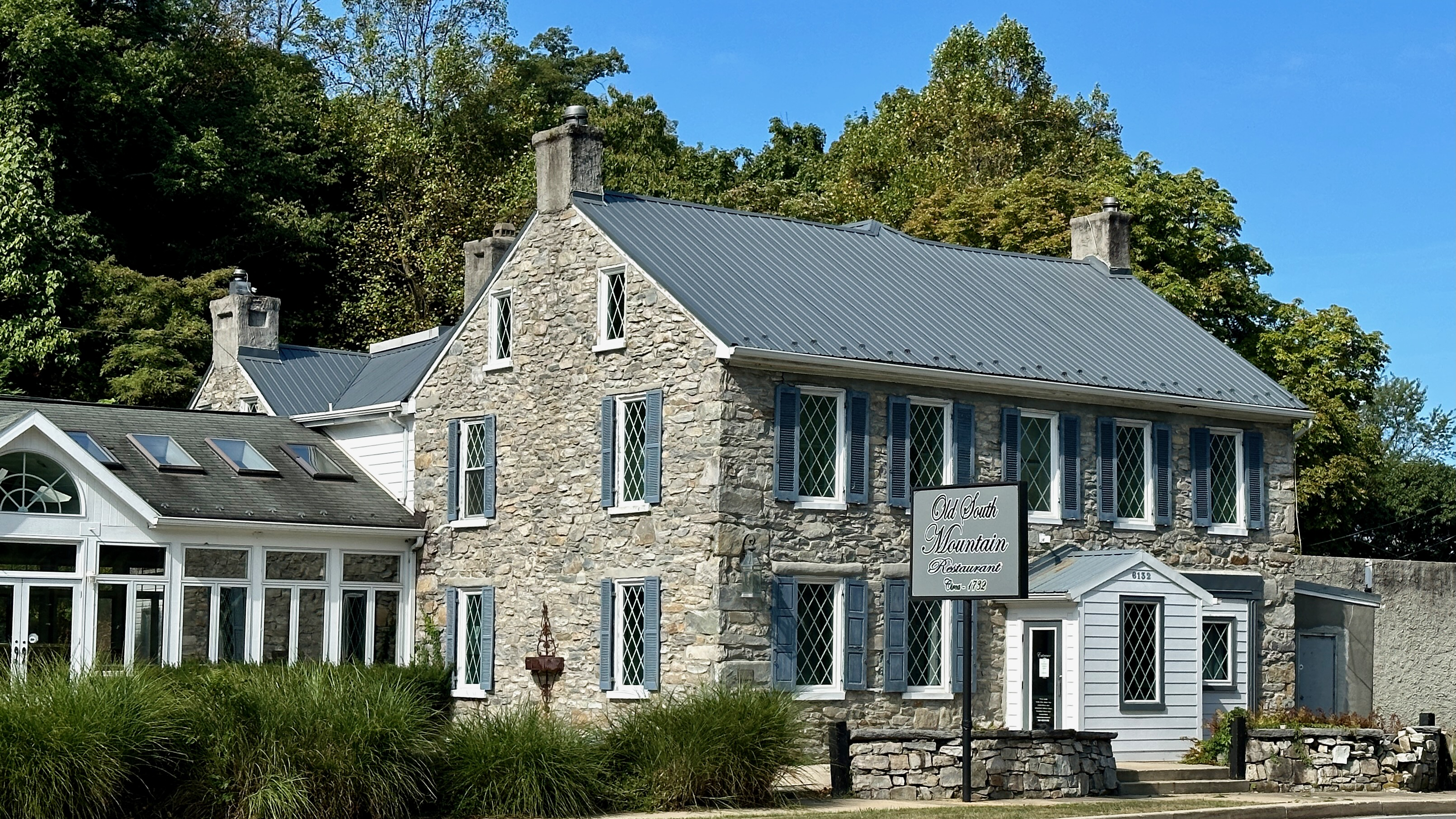
Old South Mountain Inn

The Old South Mountain Inn and Dahlgren Chapel are located at Turner's Gap.

The first road through Turner's Gap was created in 1756 as the Road from Frederick to Fort Frederick that connected the town of Frederick with the new fort built as a result of Braddock's Defeat in 1755.

A land tract named Flonham patented on April 20, 1774, by Philip Jacob Shafer includes the immediate area near the Mountain House. Frederick Fox patented a land tract named Addition to Friendship on May 27, 1805. The tract stretches from Turner's Gap to Fox's Gap and consists of approximately 95 acres at Turner's Gap and 95 acres at Fox's Gap with 12 acres connecting the two larger segments. The connecting land became the path of the Wood Road and is today the path of the Appalachian Trail between Fox's and Turner's Gaps.

Turner's Gap was the scene of heavy fighting during the Battle of South Mountain in September 1862 during the American Civil War. The area is listed on the National Register of Historic Places as part of the Turner's and Fox's Gaps Historic District.
