= Battle of Malvern Hill =

1862 battle in the American Civil War

- Part of the Seven Days Battles during the Peninsula Campaign of the American Civil War (Eastern Theater)
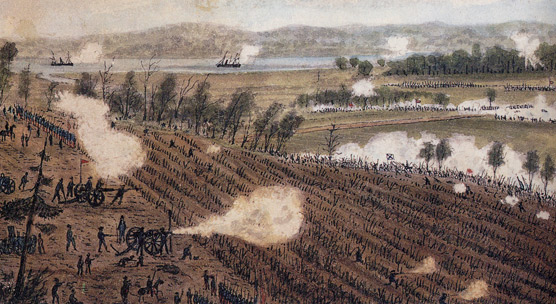
- A watercolor of the Battle of Malvern Hill by Robert Sneden
Date	July 1, 1862
Location	Henrico County, Virginia 37°24′45″N 77°15′00″W
Result	Union victory

Belligerents
United States	Confederate States

Commanders and leaders
(United States) George B. McClellan (United States) Fitz John Porter	Robert E. Lee

Units involved
(United States) Army of the Potomac	Army of Northern Virginia

Strength
54,000; 33 batteries, 171 guns (more in reserve); 3 ships	55,000; 12–14 batteries

Casualties and losses
Total: 3,007; 314 killed; 1,875 wounded; 818 missing	Total: 5,650; 869 killed; 4,241 wounded; 540 missing

The Battle of Malvern Hill, also known as the Battle of Poindexter's Farm, was fought on July 1, 1862, between the Confederate Army of Northern Virginia, led by Gen. Robert E. Lee, and the Union Army of the Potomac under Maj. Gen. George B. McClellan. It was the final battle of the Seven Days Battles during the American Civil War, taking place on a 130-foot (40 m) elevation of land known as Malvern Hill, near the Confederate capital of Richmond, Virginia and just one mile (1.6 km) from the James River. Including inactive reserves, more than fifty thousand soldiers from each side took part, using more than two hundred pieces of artillery and three warships.

The Seven Days Battles were the climax of the Peninsula Campaign, during which McClellan's Army of the Potomac sailed around the Confederate lines, landed at the tip of the Virginia Peninsula, southeast of Richmond, and struck inland towards the Confederate capital. Confederate general Joseph E. Johnston fended off McClellan's repeated attempts to take the city, slowing Union progress on the peninsula to a crawl. When Johnston was wounded, Lee took command and launched a series of counterattacks, collectively called the Seven Days Battles. These attacks culminated in the action on Malvern Hill.

The Union's V Corps, commanded by Brig. Gen. Fitz John Porter, took up positions on the hill on June 30. McClellan was not present for the initial exchanges of the battle, having boarded the ironclad USS Galena and sailed down the James River to inspect Harrison's Landing, where he intended to locate the base for his army. Confederate preparations were hindered by several mishaps. Bad maps and faulty guides caused Confederate Maj. Gen. John Magruder to be late for the battle, an excess of caution delayed Maj. Gen. Benjamin Huger, and Maj. Gen. Stonewall Jackson had problems collecting the Confederate artillery.

The battle occurred in stages: an initial exchange of artillery fire, a minor charge by Confederate Brig. Gen. Lewis Armistead, and three successive waves of Confederate infantry charges triggered by unclear orders from Lee and the actions of Maj. Gens. Magruder and D. H. Hill, respectively. In each phase, the effectiveness of the Federal artillery was the deciding factor, repulsing attack after attack, resulting in a tactical Union victory. In the course of four hours, a series of blunders in planning and communication had caused Lee's forces to launch three failed frontal infantry assaults across hundreds of yards of open ground, unsupported by Confederate artillery, charging toward firmly entrenched Union infantry and artillery defenses. These errors provided Union forces with an opportunity to inflict heavy casualties.

Despite the Union army's victory, the battle did little to alter the outcome of the Peninsula Campaign: after the battle, McClellan and his forces withdrew from Malvern Hill to Harrison's Landing, where he remained until August 16. His plan to capture Richmond had been thwarted. The Confederate press heralded Lee as the savior of Richmond. In stark contrast, McClellan was accused of being absent from the battlefield, a harsh criticism that haunted him when he ran for president in 1864.

== Background ==
=== Military situation ===
In spring 1862, Union commander Maj. Gen. George B. McClellan developed an ambitious plan to capture Richmond, the Confederate capital, on the Virginia Peninsula. His 121,500-man Army of the Potomac, along with 14,592 animals, 1,224 wagons and ambulances, and 44 artillery batteries, would load onto 389 vessels and sail to the tip of the peninsula at Fort Monroe, then move inland and capture the capital, some 80 miles away. The bold and sweeping landing was executed with few incidents, but the Federals were delayed for about a month in the siege of Yorktown. When McClellan's army finally did attack on May 4, the defensive earthworks around Yorktown were undefended. After some hours, the Army of the Potomac pursued the retreating Confederates. When Union troops encountered the Confederate rearguard at Williamsburg, the two armies fought an inconclusive battle. The Confederates continued their withdrawal that night. To stymie the Southerners' retreat, McClellan sent Brig. Gen. William F. "Baldy" Smith to Eltham's Landing by boat, resulting in a battle there on May 7. When the Union Army tried to attack Richmond by way of the James River, they were turned back at Drewry's Bluff on May 15. All the while, McClellan continued his pursuit of Confederate forces, who were withdrawing quickly towards Richmond.

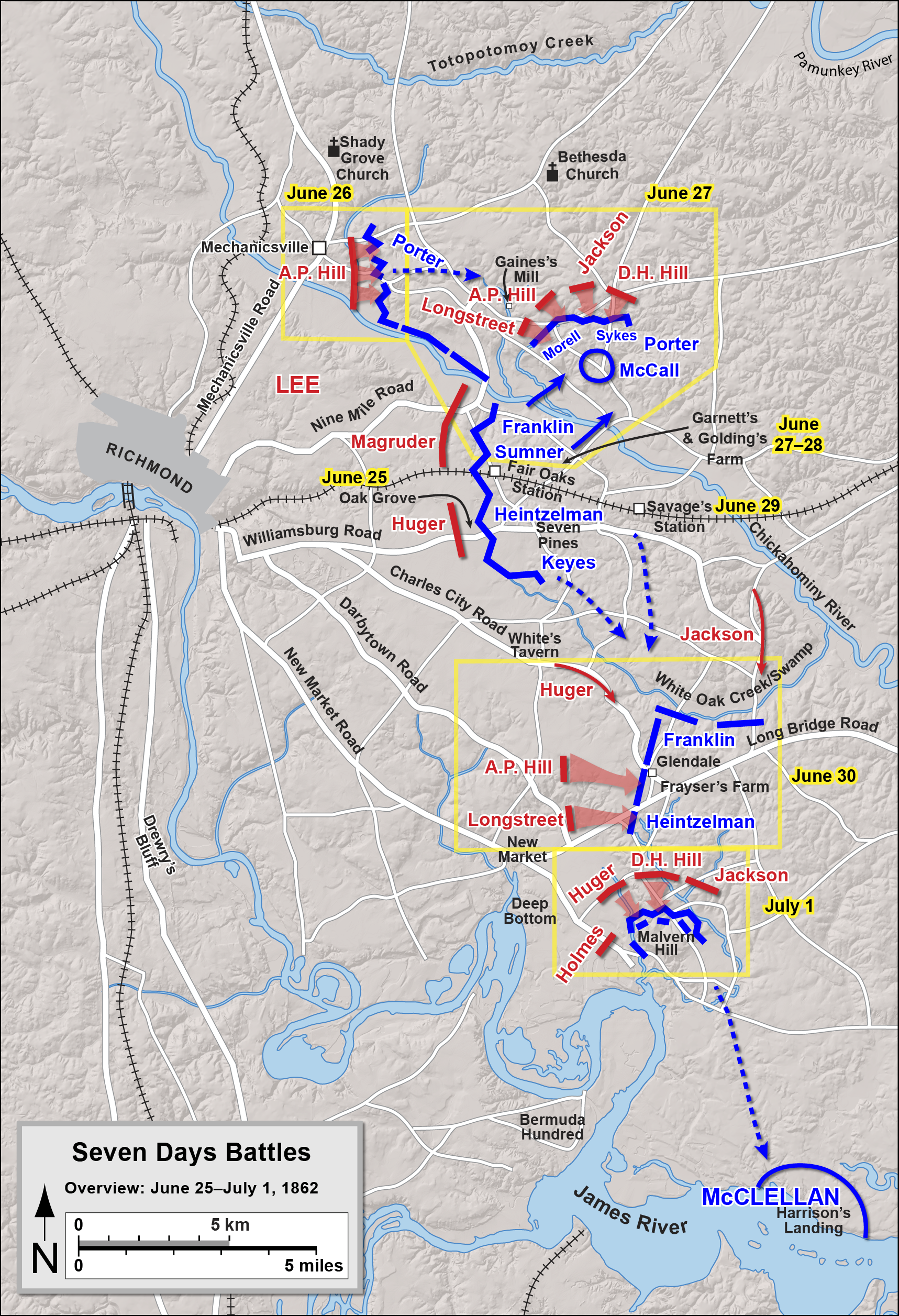
Seven Days Battles map shows the succession of battles: Mechanicsville, Gaines Mill, Savage's Station, Glendale, and Malvern Hill.

The lack of decisive action on the Virginia Peninsula spurred President Abraham Lincoln to order McClellan's army to move into positions close to Richmond. By May 30, McClellan had begun moving troops across the Chickahominy River, the only major natural barrier that separated his army from Richmond. However, heavy rains and thunderstorms on the night of May 30 caused the water level to swell, washing away two bridges and splitting the Federal army in two across the Chickahominy. In the subsequent Battle of Seven Pines, Confederate general-in-chief Joseph E. Johnston sought to capitalize on the bifurcation of McClellan's army, attacking the half of the Union Army that was stuck south of the river. Johnston's plan fell apart, and McClellan lost no ground. Late in the battle, Johnston was hit in the right shoulder by a bullet and in the chest by a shell fragment; his command went to Maj. Gen. Gustavus W. Smith. Smith's tenure as commander of the Army of Northern Virginia was short. On June 1, after an unsuccessful attack on Union forces, Jefferson Davis, the President of the Confederacy, appointed Robert E. Lee, his own military adviser, to replace Smith as the commander-in-chief of the Confederate armies.

The subsequent two weeks on the peninsula were mostly quiet. On June 25, though, a surprise attack by McClellan began a series of six major battles over the next week near Richmond—the Seven Days Battles. On the first day, as Lee led the Army of Northern Virginia toward the Union lines, McClellan preempted him with an attack at Oak Grove. Lee's men successfully warded off the Union assault, and Lee continued with his plans. The next morning, the Confederates attacked the Army of the Potomac at Mechanicsville. Union forces turned back the Confederate onslaught, inflicting heavy losses. After Mechanicsville, McClellan's army withdrew to a position behind Boatswain's Swamp. There, on June 27, the Union soldiers suffered another Confederate attack, this time at Gaines's Mill. In the resulting battle, the Confederates launched numerous failed charges, until a final concerted attack broke the Union line, resulting in the only clear Confederate victory during the Seven Days. The action at Garnett's and Golding's Farm, fought next, was merely a set of skirmishes. Lee attacked the Union Army at the Battle of Savage's Station on June 29 and the battles of Glendale and White Oak Swamp June 30, but all three battles were inconclusive. After this series of conflicts that inflicted thousands of casualties on both armies, McClellan began to assemble his forces in an imposing natural position atop Malvern Hill.

=== Geography and location ===
It was as beautiful a country as my eyes ever beheld. The cultivated fields, interspersed with belts & clusters of timber & dotted with delightful residences, extended several miles. The hills were quite high, but the slopes gradual & free from abruptness. Wheat was in the shock, oats were ready for the harvest, & corn was waist high. All were of most luxuriant growth.

— Lieutenant Charles B. Haydon of the 2nd Michigan Infantry, personal diary

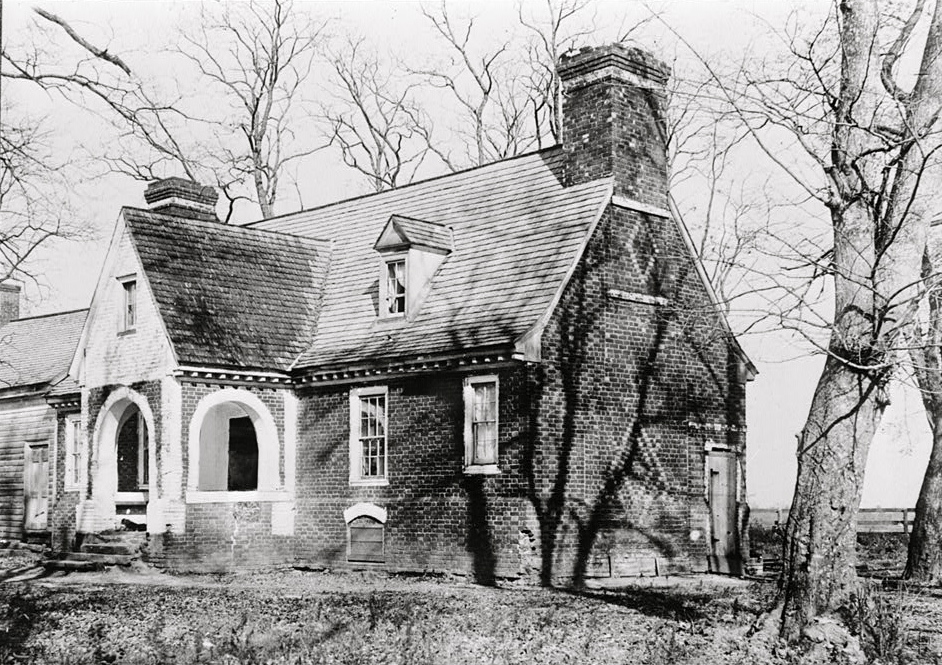
The Malvern House

Malvern Hill, a plateau-like elevation in Henrico County, Virginia, provided an impressive natural military position about two miles (3.2 km) north of the James River. The hill rose some 130 feet (40 m) to its crest to form a crescent about 1.5 miles (2.4 km) in length and 0.75 miles (1.21 km) wide. Its slope was about one mile (1.6 km) in length and very gradual, with only one or two notable depressions. Along the western side of the hill ran Malvern Cliffs, a bluff-like formation that overlooked Turkey Run, a tributary of nearby Turkey Island Creek. Western Run was another tributary of Turkey Island Creek, which lay mostly along the eastern side of the hill and slanted slightly into the northern side. One depression dipped some sixty feet (18 m) at the valley of Western Run and slanted upwards to the plateau. Malvern Hill's center was slightly lower than the flanks. The gentle, bare slant meant that any assailing army could not easily take cover, and artillery would have the benefit of a clear, open field.

Several farms were positioned near Malvern Hill. Roughly 1,200 yards (1,100 m) north of the hill were the Poindexter and Carter farms. Between the two farms was a swampy and thickly wooded area that made up the course of Western Run. The largest in the area was the Mellert family's farm, usually called the Crew farm for a former owner, situated at the western side of the hill. About a quarter of a mile due east of Malvern Hill was the West farm. Between these two farms lay the Willis Church Road, which some locals called the Quaker Road. This road also ran past the Malvern house, the hill's namesake, which was perched atop the southern edge of the plateau. "It was, altogether, an exceedingly formidable position", wrote historian Douglas Southall Freeman. "Had the Union engineers searched the whole countryside below Richmond, they could not have found ground more ideally set for the slaughter of an attacking army."

== Prelude ==
=== Key participants ===
Commanders in the Battle of Malvern Hill
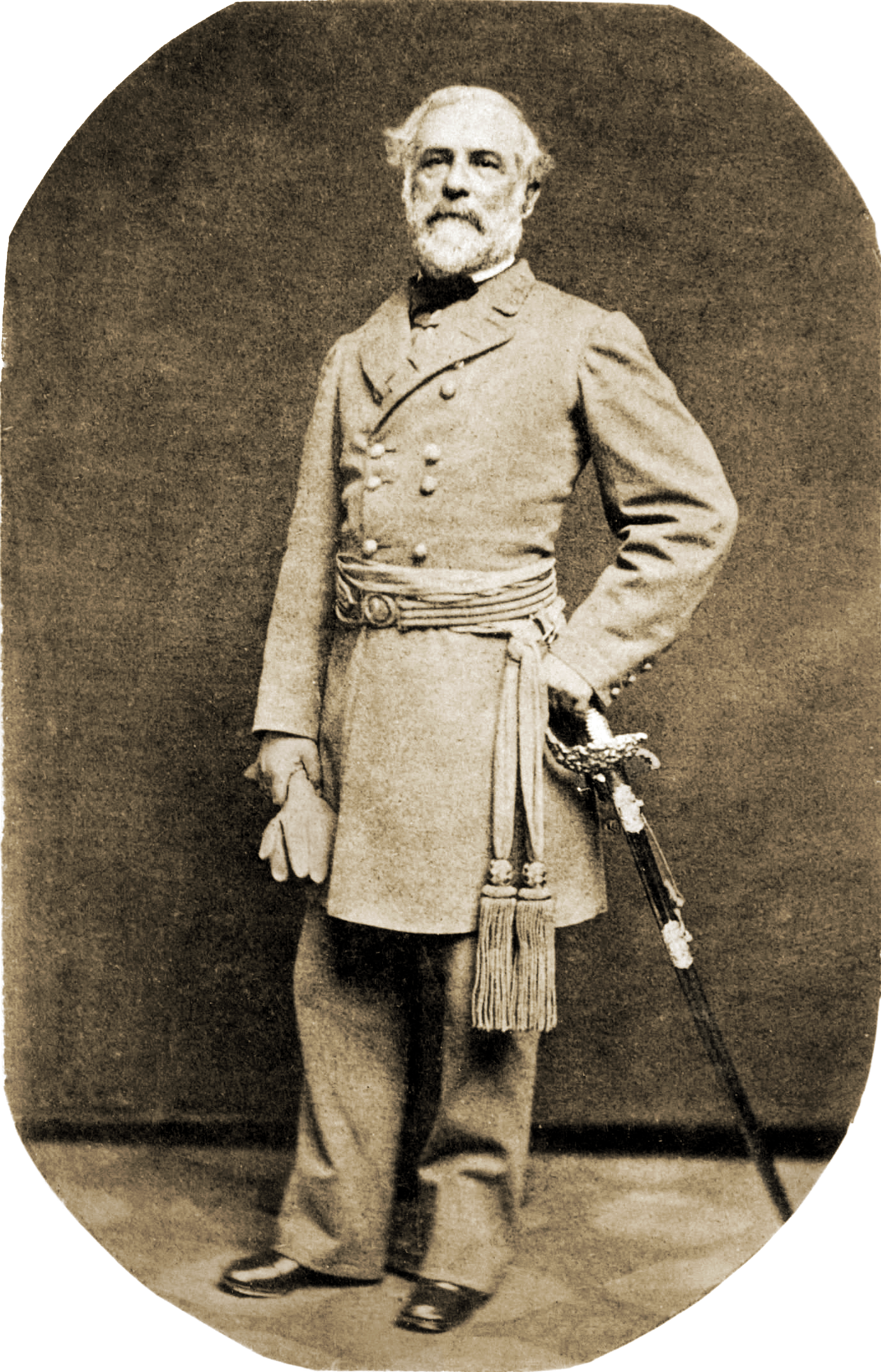
General Robert E. Lee. Lee's Army of Northern Virginia attacked the Union forces at Malvern Hill.

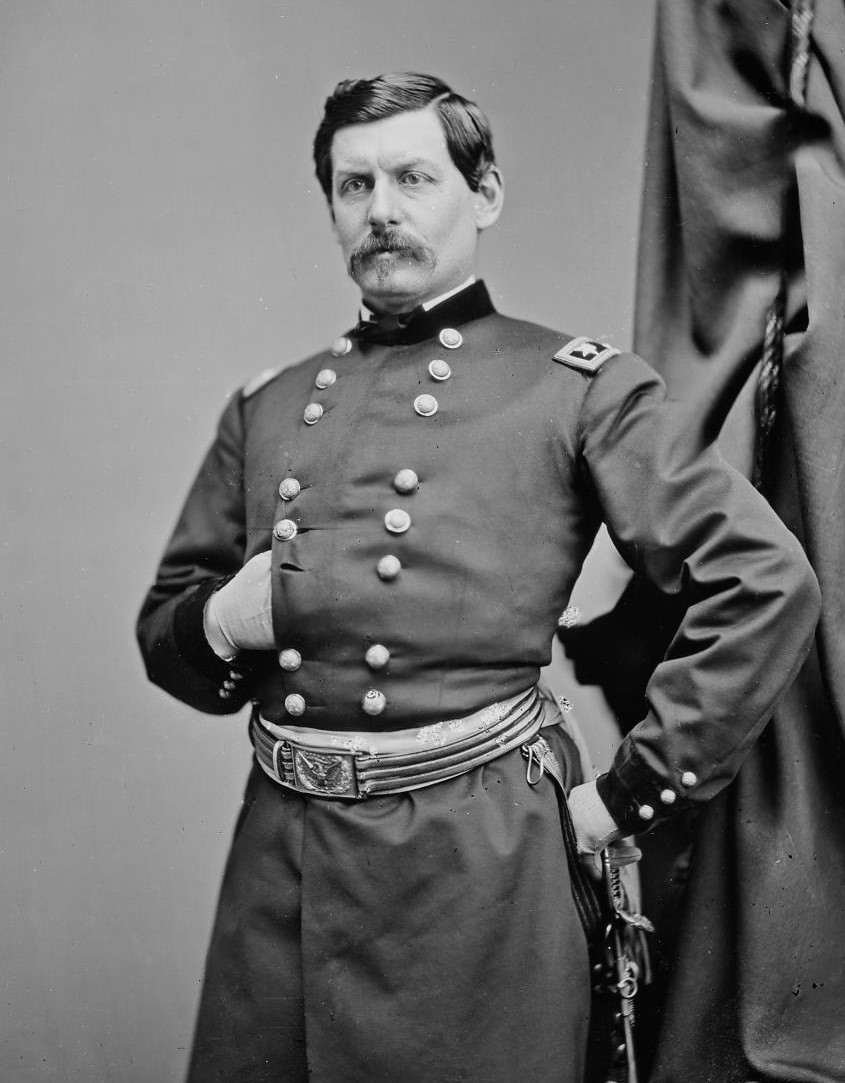
Major General George B. McClellan. McClellan's Army of the Potomac defended its position at Malvern Hill.

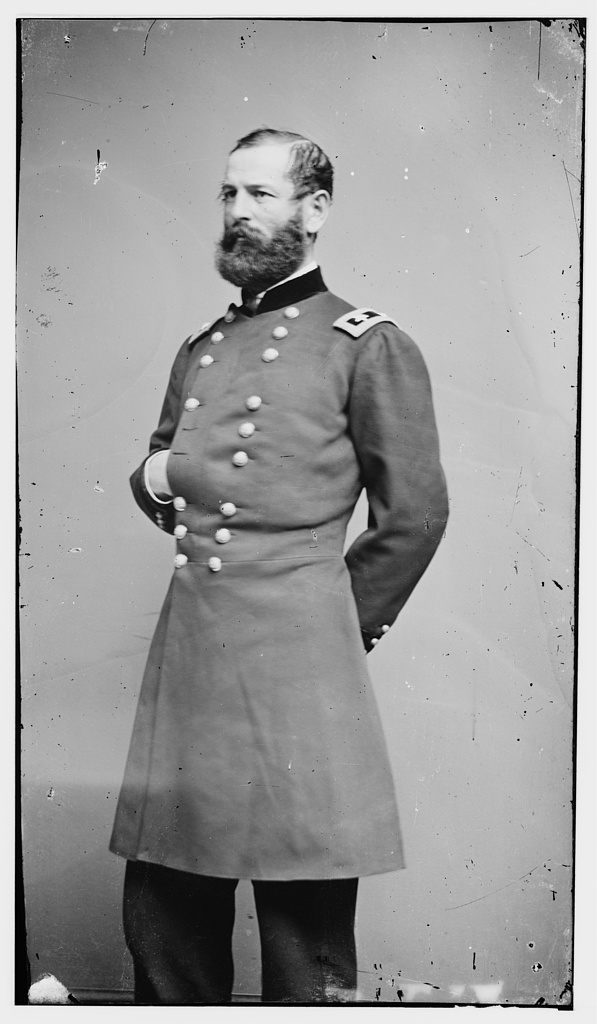
Brigadier General Fitz John Porter. After McClellan's departure from Malvern Hill, Fitz John Porter became the de facto commander of the Union troops on the hill.

=== McClellan's forces prepare ===
A few days prior to the action on Malvern Hill, McClellan incorrectly believed the Army of the Potomac was vastly outnumbered by its Confederate foe, and his fear of being cut off from his supply depot left him cautious and wary. On the night of June 28, McClellan told his generals he intended to move his army to a position on the north bank of the James River called Harrison's Landing, where they would be protected by Union gunboats. The Army of the Potomac came to Malvern Hill, the army's final stop before reaching the Landing, with approximately 54,000 men.

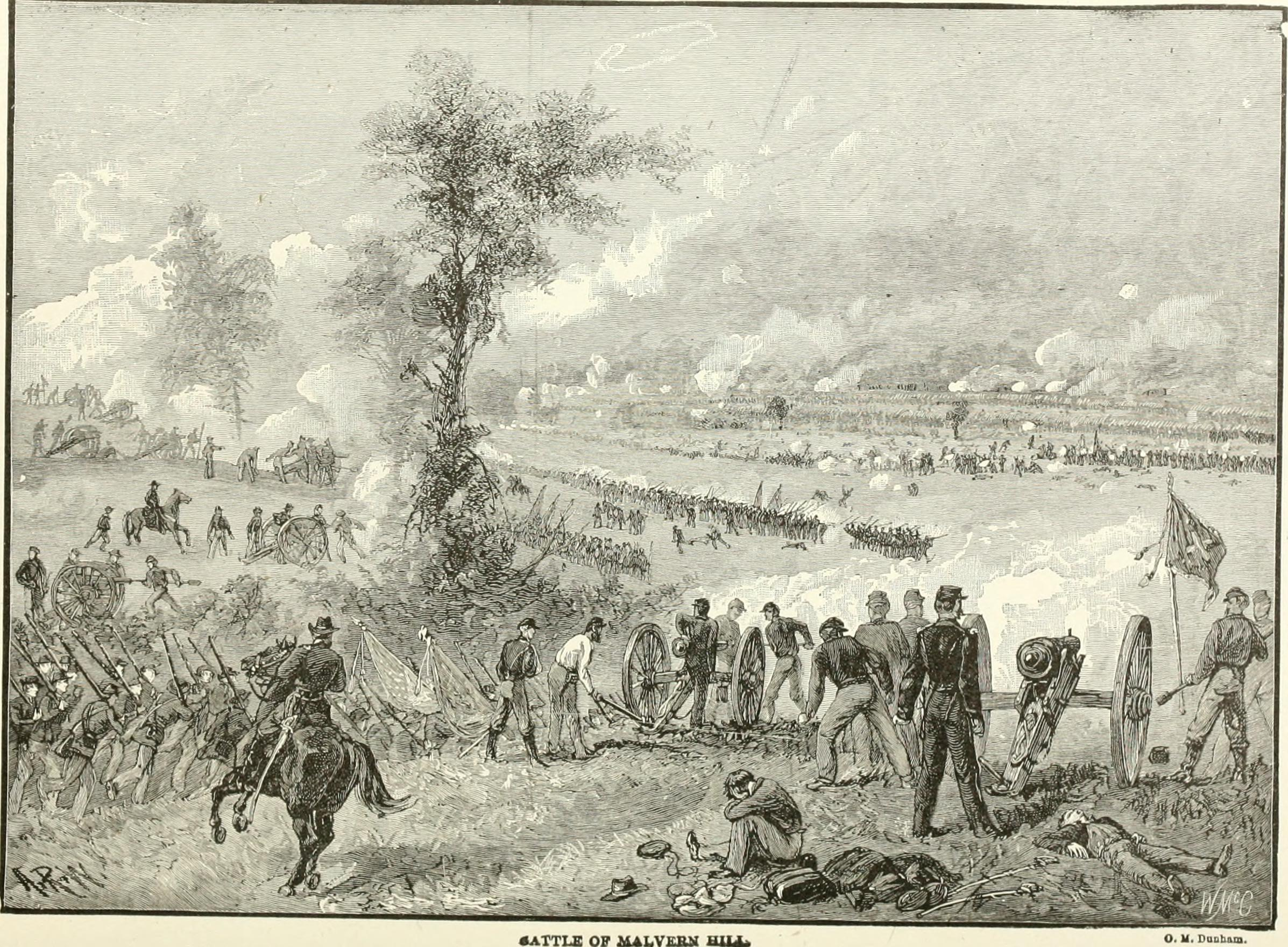
Engraving after a sketch of the battle by Alfred Waud.

On the morning of June 30, 1862, the Union V Corps under Fitz John Porter, a part of McClellan's Army of the Potomac, amassed atop Malvern Hill. Col. Henry Hunt, McClellan's skilled chief of artillery, posted 171 guns on the hill and 91 more in reserve in the south. The artillery line on the hill's slope consisted of eight batteries of field artillery with 37 guns. Brig. Gen. George Sykes's division would guard the line. In reserve were additional field artillery and three batteries of heavy artillery, which included five 4.5-inch (11 cm) Rodman guns, five 20-pounder (9.1 kg) Parrott rifles and six 32-pounder (15 kg) howitzers. As more of McClellan's forces arrived at the hill, Porter continued to reinforce the Union line. Brig. Gen. George Morell's units, stationed between the Crew and West farms, extended the line to the northeastern section. Brig. Gen. Darius Couch's division of the IV Corps, as yet unbloodied by the skirmishes of the Seven Days, further extended the northeastern line. This left 17,800 soldiers from Couch's and Morell's divisions at the northern face of the hill, overlooking the Quaker Road, from which the Federals expected Lee's forces to attack.

Early the next day, Tuesday, July 1, McClellan, having come from nearby Haxall's Landing the night before, examined his army's battle line on Malvern Hill. His inspection left him worried most about the Union Army's right (eastern) flank, which lay behind Western Run. Western Run was an area necessary for McClellan's plans to relocate to Harrison's Landing, and he feared an attack might come from there. As a result, he posted the largest portion of his army there: two divisions from Edwin Sumner's II Corps, two divisions from Brig. Gen. Samuel P. Heintzelman's III Corps, two divisions from Brig. Gen. William Franklin's VI Corps and one division from Maj. Gen. Erasmus Keyes's IV Corps, who were stationed across the James. The division under Brig. Gen. George McCall, badly mangled in the fighting at Glendale and having lost McCall and two of its three brigadiers, was held in general reserve.

McClellan did not believe his army was ready for a battle, and hoped Lee would not give them one. Nonetheless, he left his troops at Malvern Hill and traveled downstream aboard the ironclad USS Galena to inspect his army's future resting place at Harrison's Landing. McClellan did not delegate an interim commander; Porter, who was in command during the initial attack, became the de facto leader on the Union side of the battle.

=== Lee's forces advance ===
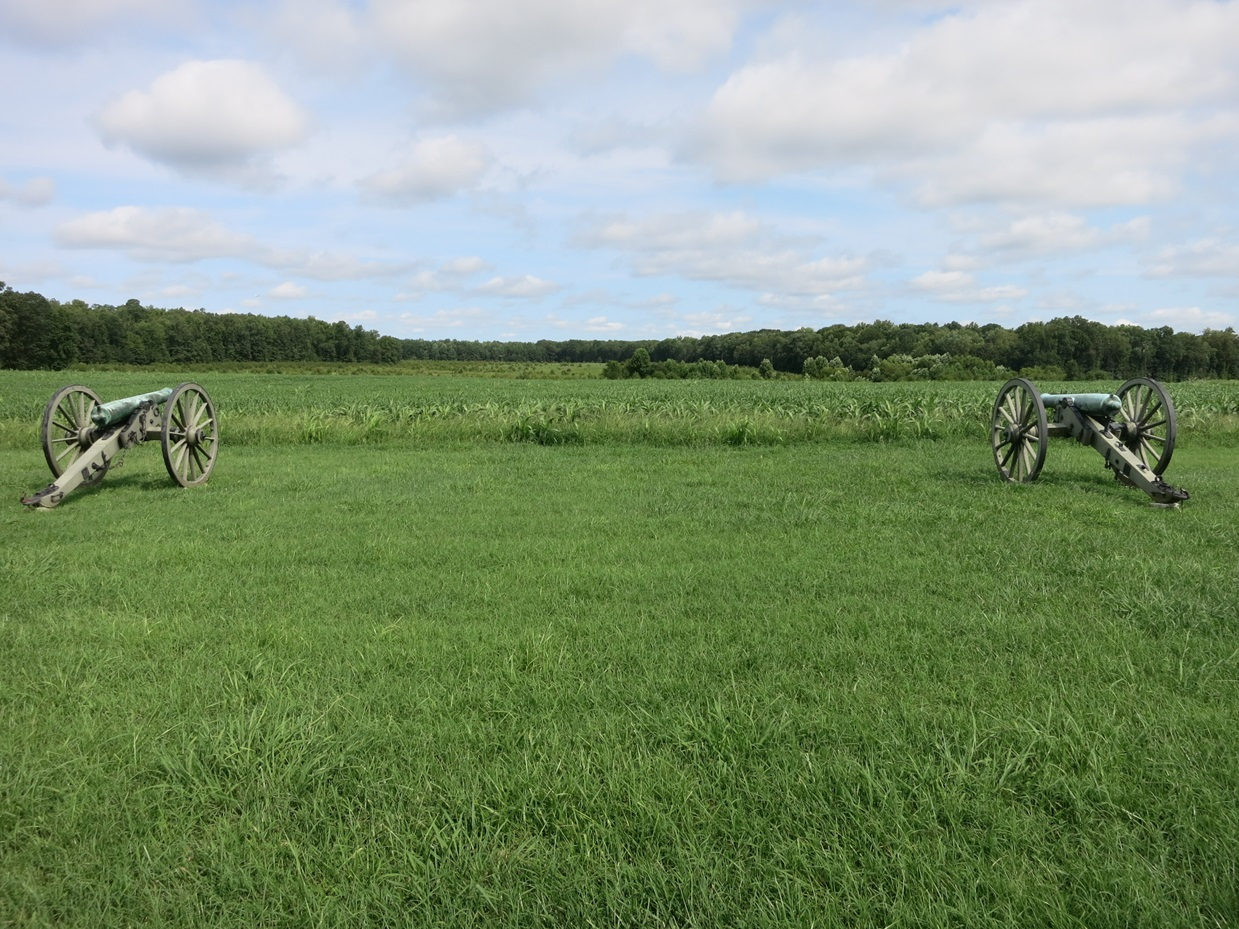
Two 12-lb Napoleons on the west side of Willis Church Road mark the Union position at Malvern Hill, facing north. The Confederates attacked directly toward the guns.

With around 55,000 soldiers, the Army of Northern Virginia was about evenly matched with the Federals, and with Lee at the helm, notably more aggressive. He wanted a final, decisive attack that would effectively scatter the Federals. Several pieces of evidence—abandoned commissary stores, wagons and arms, and the hundreds of Union stragglers and deserters his units had happened upon and captured—led Lee to conclude that the Army of the Potomac was demoralized and retreating. In all the battles up to Malvern Hill, Lee's plans to destroy the Federal army had failed for one reason or another. Though he was undeterred, his chances for decisive victory were diminishing quickly.

Early on the morning of the battle, Lee met with his lieutenants, including Maj. Gens. James Longstreet, A. P. Hill, Thomas "Stonewall" Jackson, John Magruder and D. H. Hill. D. H. Hill, after talking with a chaplain familiar with the geography of Malvern Hill, cautioned against mounting an attack. "If General McClellan is there in strength," Hill said, "we had better let him alone." Longstreet laughed off Hill's objections, saying "Don't get so scared, now that we've got him [McClellan] whipped."

Lee chose the relatively well-rested commands of D. H. Hill, Stonewall Jackson and John Magruder to lead the Confederate offensive, as they had barely participated in the fighting of the day before. James Longstreet and A.P. Hill's divisions were held in reserve as they were in no condition to fight after Glendale, with almost half their officers and close to a quarter of the enlisted men killed or wounded. Brig. Gen Winfield Featherston's brigade was temporarily commanded by Brig. Gen George B. Anderson of D.H. Hill's division, as there was nobody left in the brigade above the rank of major. According to Lee's plan, the Army of Northern Virginia would form a semi-circle enveloping Malvern Hill. D. H. Hill's five brigades would be placed along the northern face of the hill, forming the center of the Confederate line, and the commands of Stonewall Jackson and John Magruder would take the left and right flanks, respectively. Whiting's forces would position themselves on the Poindexter farm, with the outfits of Brig. Gen. Charles Sidney Winder and Richard Ewell nearby. The infantry of these three detachments would provide reinforcement for the Confederate line if necessary. Two veteran generals rejoined the Army of Northern Virginia for the battle, Brig. Gen Wade Hampton and Brig. Gen Jubal Early, both wounded two months earlier. Hampton and Early were given command of two of Jackson's brigades which had lost their commanders at Gaines Mill and had only inexperienced colonels to lead them. Maj. Gen. Theophilus Holmes would take up a position on the extreme Confederate right flank.

=== Disposition of armies ===
The Army of the Potomac's disposition in the lead-up to the battle was more orderly than Lee's Army of Northern Virginia; all of McClellan's forces would be concentrated in one place, save for Erasmus Keyes and one of his two divisions, which were stationed across the James River. A Confederate scout observed Union soldiers resting in position, and moving about the hill unworried, whilst the disposition of the cannons around the hill's slope gave him the impression that the position was "almost impregnable". McClellan's army was on the hill in force.

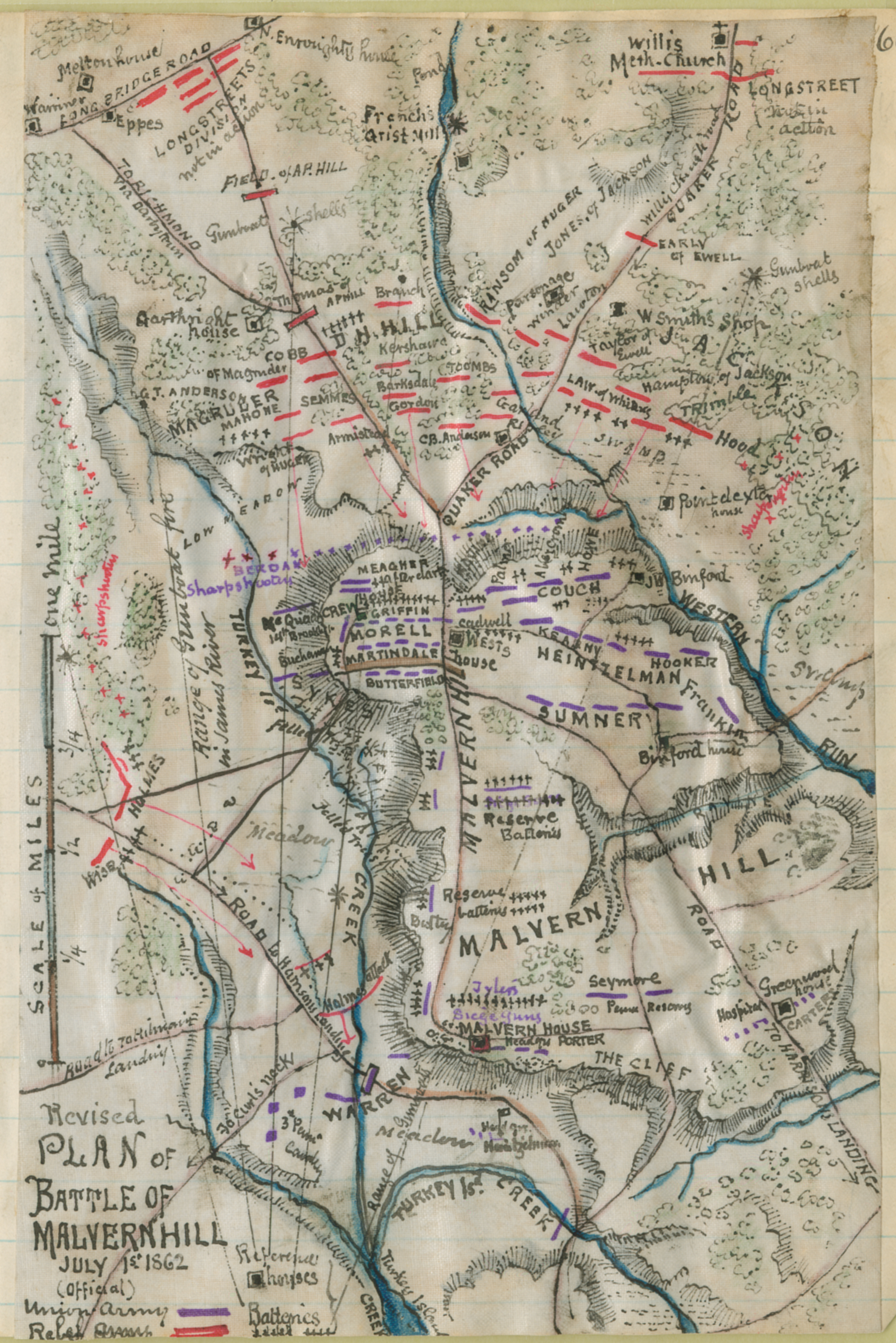
This map of the Malvern Hill battlefield labels the Willis Church Road as "Quaker Road". Magruder's "Quaker Road" branched off of the Long Bridge Road, which appears in the upper left corner.

Throughout the Seven Days Battles, Lee's forces had been separated and scattered due to swamps, narrow roads and other geographic obstacles, and occasionally due to unclear orders. As the days of marching and fighting wore on the number of stragglers swelled to fill narrow roads and significantly deplete the Confederate ranks, presenting a significant additional strain on their combat readiness. These hindrances continued during the Battle of Malvern Hill, with both Magruder and Huger making mistakes in the deployment of their forces.

At first, Magruder's units were behind Stonewall Jackson's column while marching down the Long Bridge Road, which led to Malvern Hill. Along this road were several adjoining pathways. One such road, called the Willis Church Road by some locals and the Quaker Road by others, led south from Glendale to Malvern Hill. Lee's maps labeled this "Quaker Road". Another of these paths began near a local farm and angled southwest toward an upriver point on the River Road—some locals called this the Quaker Road, including Magruder's guides, who led Magruder's army down this road rather than the Quaker Road shown on Lee's maps. James Longstreet eventually rode after Magruder, and persuaded him to reverse course. This incident delayed Magruder's arrival to the battlefield for three hours.

Huger, worried about clashing with Union forces while marching towards Malvern Hill, had also failed to manage his division effectively. He deployed two of his brigades, commanded by Brig. Gens. Lewis Armistead and Ambrose Wright, to perform a flanking maneuver around any Federals they found, to avoid the Union threat. Longstreet eventually notified Huger that he would be unobstructed by Federal forces if he marched to Malvern Hill. Huger, however, remained in place until someone from Lee's headquarters came to guide them to the battlefield.

As noon drew near with no sight of either Huger or Magruder, who were supposed to be manning the Confederate right flank, Lee replaced these two forces with the smaller units of Brig. Gens. Armistead and Wright, two of Huger's brigades that had reached the battlefield some time earlier. Huger and his other two brigades (under Brig. Gens. Ransom and Mahone) were still too far north of the scene. Despite the mishaps and disunity, Malvern Hill would be the first time during the Seven Days Battles that Lee managed to concentrate his force.

== Battle ==
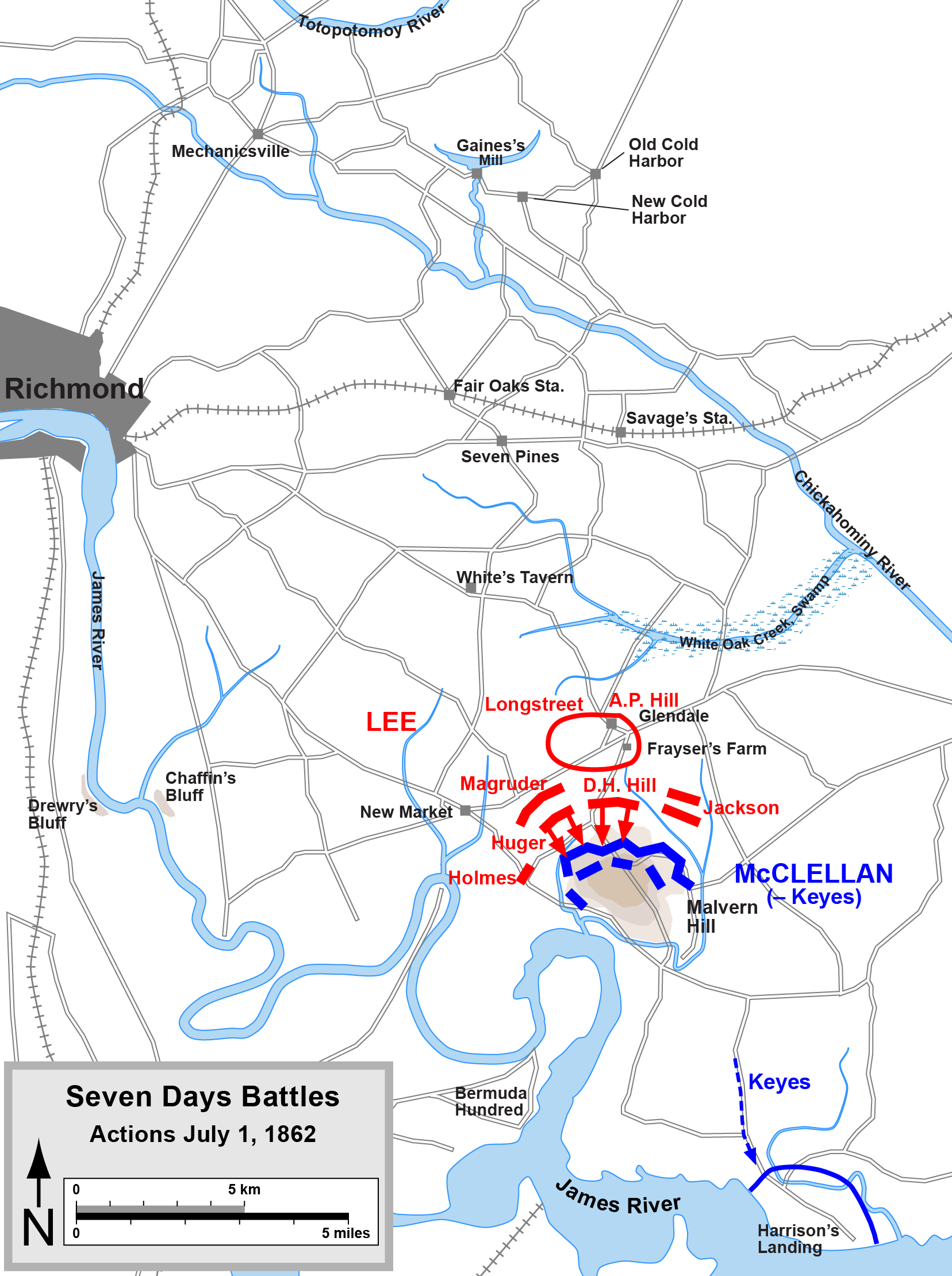
Battle of Malvern Hill; Confederate forces are indicated in red, and Union forces are indicated in blue.

=== Lee orders artillery crossfire ===
Message to Confederate commanders (Note: According to historian Stephen W. Sears, it is quite unlikely that Lee saw and approved such a vague and faulty order. Rather, he dictated his plan to Chilton, and had Chilton draft the order.)

Batteries have been established to rake the enemies' line. If broken as is probable, [Brig. Gen. Lewis] Armistead, who can witness the effect of the fire, has been ordered to charge with a yell. Do the same.

— Col. Robert H. Chilton's draft to commanders, sent July 1, 1862, about 1:30 pm.

Lee surveyed the left flank himself for possible artillery positions. After a reconnoitering expedition on the right flank, James Longstreet returned to Lee; the two compared their results and concluded that two grand battery-like positions would be established at the left and right sides of Malvern Hill. The converging artillery fire from the batteries, they reasoned, could weaken the Union line so a Confederate infantry attack could break through. If this plan did not work out, Lee and Longstreet felt the artillery fire would buy them time to consider other plans.

With a battle plan in order, Lee sent a draft to his lieutenants, written by his chief of staff, Col. Robert Chilton. The orders were not well-crafted, however, since they designated the yell of a single charging brigade as the only signal of attack for a full fifteen brigades. Amid the tumult and clamor of battle, this was bound to create confusion. Moreover, Chilton's draft effectively left the attack solely at the discretion of Lewis Armistead, who had never before held command of a brigade during battle. The draft also did not note the time it had been written, which later caused confusion for Magruder.

=== Failed Confederate barrage ===
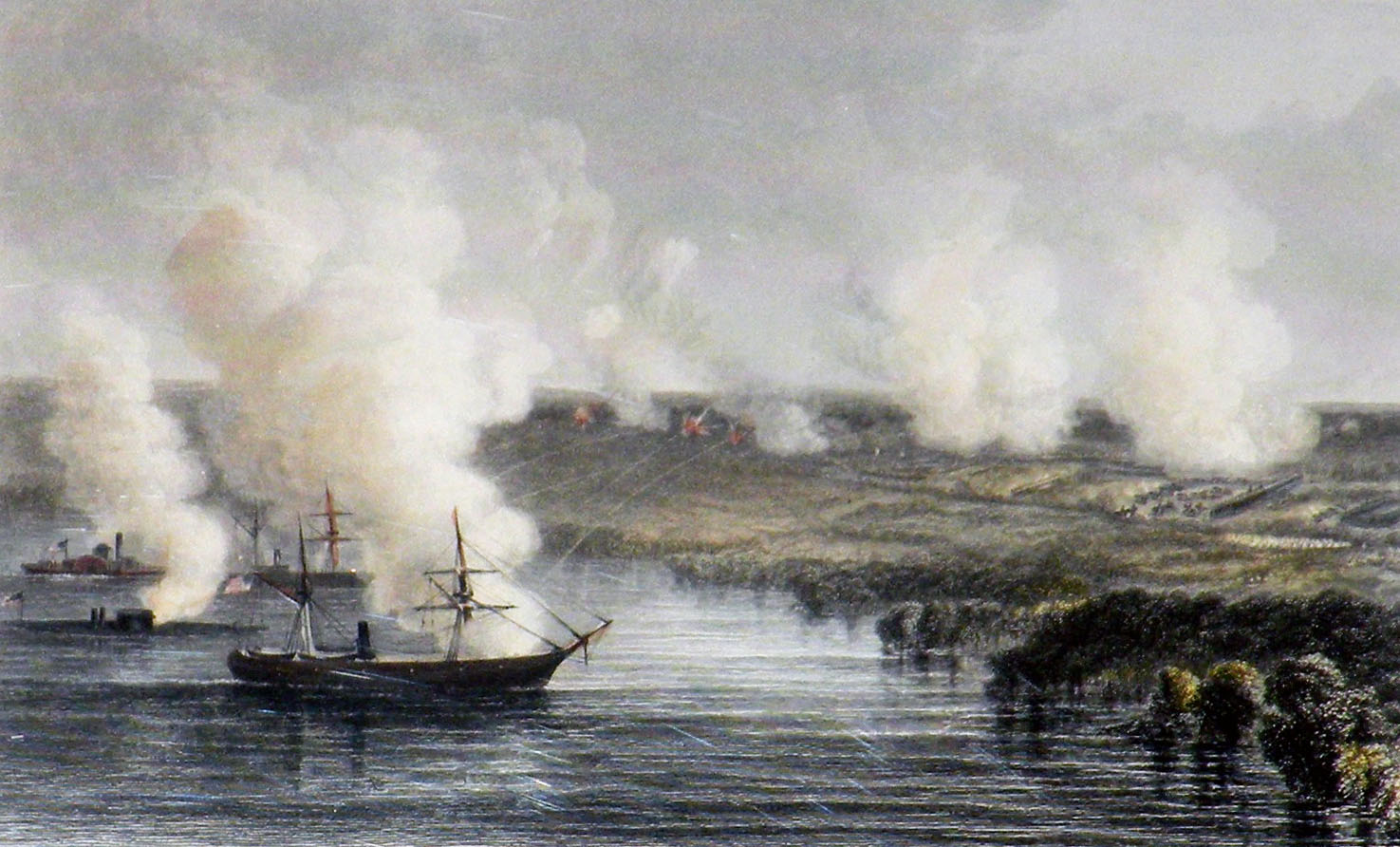
Union ships launching missiles onto the battlefield at Malvern Hill

Beginning around 1 pm, Union artillery fired first, initially upon infantry in the woods, and later upon any Confederate artillery that attempted to move into firing position. On the Confederate left flank, two batteries from Whiting's division and one from Jackson's (Note: Whiting's two batteries were Balthis' Battery, Staunton (Virginia) Artillery, led by Capt. W. L. Balthis; and Reilly's Battery, Rowan (North Carolina) Artillery, under Capt. James Reilly. Jackson's was Poague's Battery, Rockbridge (Virginia) Artillery, commanded by Capt. William T. Poague.) soon began firing from their position upon Darius Couch's division of the IV Corps, who were near the center of the Union line. This began a fierce firefight, with the Union's eight batteries and 37 guns concentrated against three Confederate batteries and sixteen guns. The Union fire silenced the Rowan Artillery and made their position untenable. The other two Confederate batteries, placed by Jackson himself, were in somewhat better positions, and managed to keep firing. Over a period of more than three hours, a total of six or eight Confederate batteries engaged the Union Army from the Confederate left flank, but they were usually engaged only one at a time. (Note: Settles gives the total at eight; Sears says it was six. Both accounts include the two of Ewell's batteries that briefly supported the charges of Wright and Mahone.)

On the Confederate right flank a total of six batteries (Note: Magruder's batteries were Hart's Battery, Washington (South Carolina) Artillery: Capt. James F. Hart, and McCarthy's (Virginia) Battery, 1st Richmond Howitzers: Capt. E. S. McCarthy. Huger's batteries were Grimes' (Virginia) Battery: Capt. Carey F. Grimes, and Moorman's (Virginia) Battery: Capt. M. N. Moorman. The sole engaged battery from Pendleton's reserves was Davidson's Battery, Letcher (Virginia) Artillery: Capt. Greenlee Davidson. A single battery from A. P. Hill's Light Division also engaged: Pegram's (Virginia) Battery: Capt. William J. Pegram.) engaged the Federals, but they did so one-by-one instead of in unison, and each was consecutively cut to pieces by concentrated Union artillery fire. Moreover, they engaged the Union artillery later than the guns of the left flank, so the desired crossfire bombardment was never achieved.

In all, the Confederate artillery barrage on both flanks completely failed to achieve its objectives. Confederate fire did manage to kill Capt. John E. Beam of the Union's 1st New Jersey Artillery, along with a few others, and several Federal batteries (though none that were actually engaged) had to move to avoid the fire. Although the barrage by Lee's forces did claim a few lives, Union forces remained unfazed and continued their fearsome barrage. Indeed, Union Army Lt. Charles B. Haydon supposedly fell asleep during the artillery fight. On both the left and right flanks, several of the batteries that did engage lasted no more than minutes before being rendered incapable of fire. Moreover, in a failure of command that, according to historian Thomas M. Settles, must ultimately be placed on Lee's shoulders, the movements of the two flanks were never coordinated with each other. D. H. Hill found the failure of the Confederate artillery discouraging and later dismissed the barrage as "most farcical".

Meanwhile, the Union artillery fire was planned and directed nearly flawlessly. As historian Jennings Cropper Wise notes, Col. Hunt, McClellan's chief of artillery, continuously refocused Union fire on various fronts, in an "enormous sheaf of fire of more than 50 superior pieces, disabling four of Huger's and several of Jackson's batteries almost the instant they came into action". This severely hampered the Confederates' ability to respond effectively to the Federal barrage. The Union artillery subdued a number of the Southerners' batteries; those few that remained attacked piecemeal, and failed to produce any significant result.

=== Confederate infantry assaults ===
Intense Confederate and especially Union artillery fire continued for at least an hour, slackening at about 2:30 pm. At about 3:30 pm, Lewis Armistead noticed Union skirmishers creeping towards his men where the grand battery on the Confederate right flank was, nearly within rifle range of them. Armistead sent three regiments (about half of his brigade) (Note: The three units were the 14th Virginia, the 38th Virginia and the 53rd Virginia.) from his command to push back the skirmishers, thus beginning the infantry part of the battle. The skirmishers were repelled quickly, but Armistead's men found themselves in the midst of an intense Union barrage. The Confederates decided to nestle themselves in a ravine along the hill's slant. This position protected them from the fire, but pinned them down on the slopes of Malvern Hill, unsupported by either infantry or artillery. They did not have enough men to advance any further and retreating would have put them back into the crossfire.

==== Magruder's charge ====
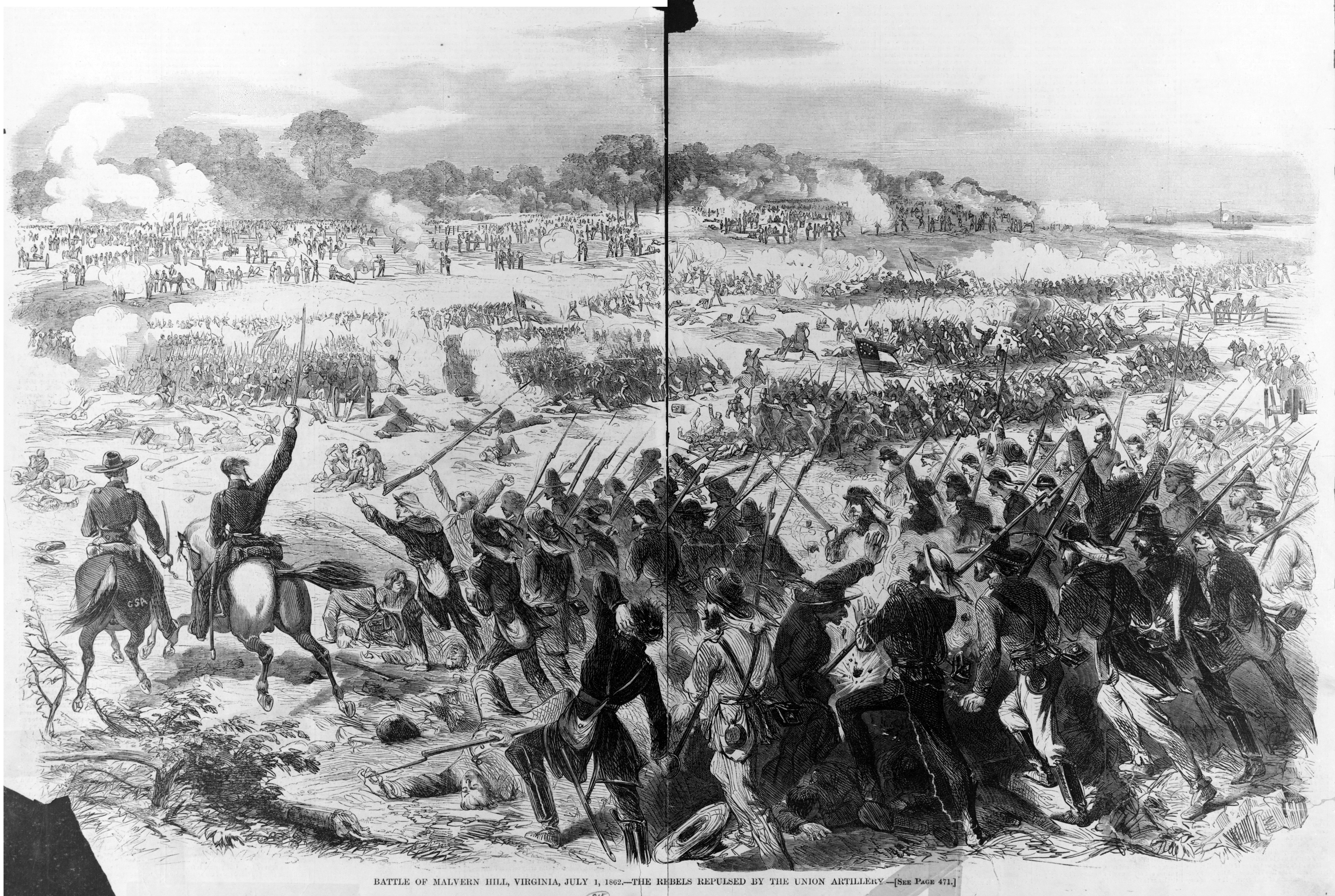
Confederate attacks repulsed by Unionist artillery, Harper's Weekly 1862 July 26

Not long after the advance of Armistead's regiments, John Magruder and his men arrived near the battlefield, albeit quite late because of the confusion regarding the names of local roads—by this time, it was 4 pm. Magruder was told at that morning's war council to move to Huger's right, but he was unaware of Huger's position, and sent Major Joseph L. Brent to locate Huger's right flank. Brent found Huger, who said he had no idea where his brigades were. Huger was noticeably upset that his men had been given orders by someone other than himself; Lee had told Huger's two brigades under Armistead and Ambrose Wright to advance to the right part of the Confederate line. Upon hearing of this, Magruder was quite confused. He sent Capt. A. G. Dickinson to find Lee and inform him of the "successful" charge of Armistead's men and request further orders. Contrary to this message, Armistead was in fact pinned down halfway up Malvern Hill. At the same time, Whiting sent Lee an incorrect report that Union forces were retreating. Whiting had mistaken two events for a Federal withdrawal—the movement of Edwin Sumner's troops, who were adjusting their position to avoid the Confederate fire, and the relaxing of Union fire on his side, which was actually the Union artillery concentrating their firepower to a different front. Whiting and Magruder's erroneous reports led Lee to send a draft of orders to Magruder via Dickinson: "General Lee expects you to advance rapidly", wrote Dickinson. "He says it is reported that the enemy is [retreating]. Press forward your whole line and follow up Armistead's success." Before Dickinson returned with these orders, Magruder was belatedly handed the order sent out three hours previously (at 1:30 pm) by Chilton. Since no time was affixed to the text of the orders, Magruder was unaware that these orders had been rendered meaningless by the failure of the Confederate artillery during the past few hours, and believed he had received two successive orders from Lee to attack.

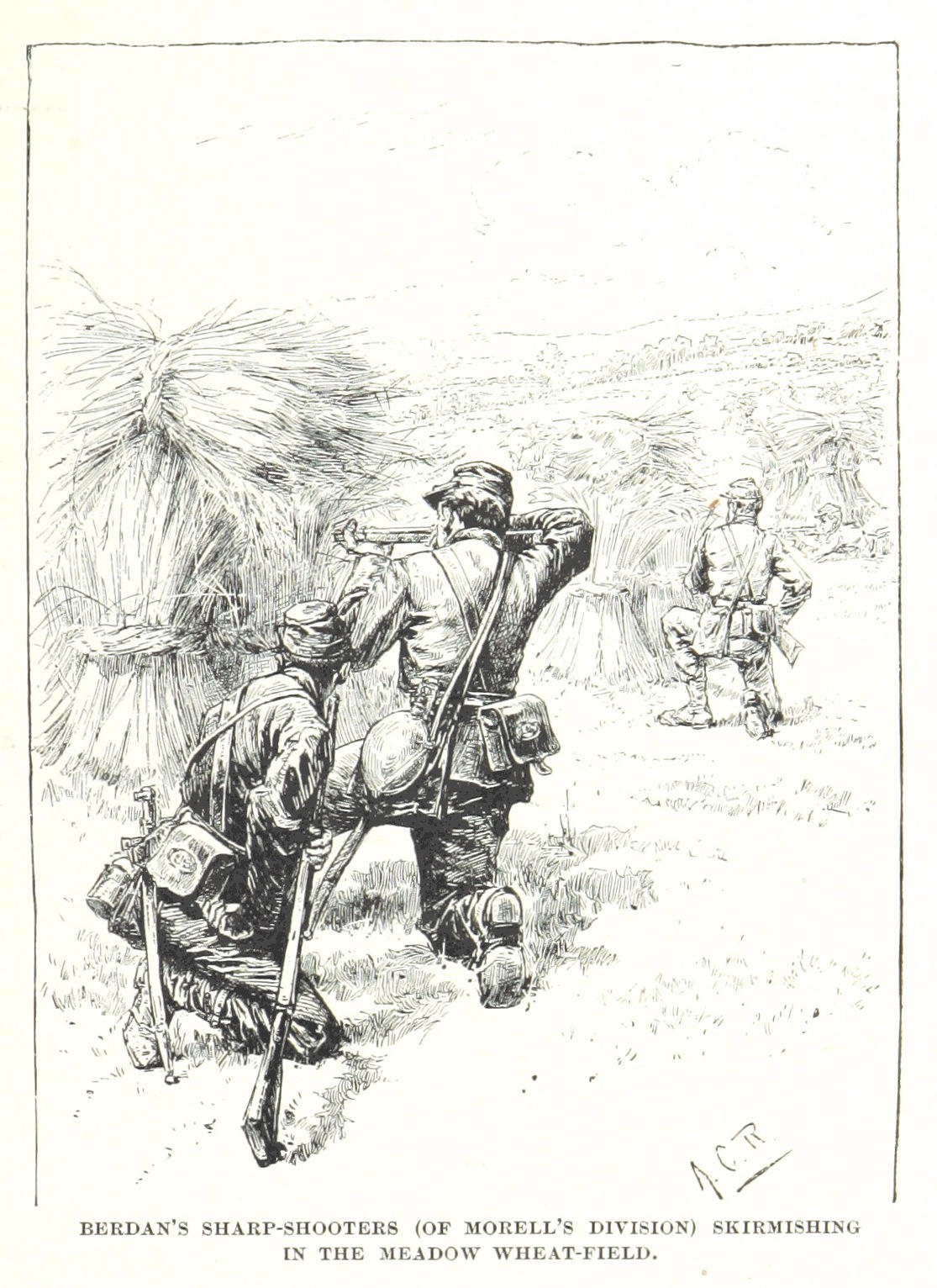
Union sharpshooters of the 1st United States Sharpshooters fire on the Confederates.

Believing himself bound by Lee's order to charge, but with his own brigades not yet in attacking position, Magruder mustered some five thousand men from Huger's brigades, including those of Ambrose Wright and Maj. Gen. William Mahone and half of the men from Armistead's brigade who were caught in the open battlefield. Magruder had also sent for Brig. Gen. Robert Ransom, Jr., also under Huger's command, who noted that he had been given strict instructions to ignore any orders not originating from Huger, and apologetically said he could not help Magruder. Magruder additionally ordered men under his personal command—three regiments of Brig. Gen. Howell Cobb's brigade, plus Col. William Barksdale's full brigade—to the attack. Because of the confusion regarding Quaker Road, however, these brigades were not yet near enough to do more than move into supporting position, and Magruder wanted to attack immediately. Despite this, under Magruder's order at about 5:30 pm, Wright's brigade with Armistead's, then Mahone's brigade, started darting out of the woods and towards the Union line. The artillery of the Confederate left flank, under Jackson's personal command, also renewed their barrage with the late arrival of two batteries of Richard Ewell's division. The Confederates were initially engaged solely by Union sharpshooters, but the latter quickly fell back to give their own artillery a clear field of fire. Antipersonnel canister shot was employed with deadly effect. Wright's men were pinned down in a small depression on the rolling hillside, to the right of Armistead's; Mahone's were driven back into retreat in about the same area. At some point during the first wave of assaults, Cobb moved into close supporting position behind Armistead. Barksdale's men were also supporting, to the left of Armistead.

The firefight also alerted the three Union boats on the James—the ironclad USS Galena, and the gunboats USS Jacob Bell and USS Aroostook (Note: Sources do not make clear what time the warships began their barrage. However, the Galena returned from Harrison's Landing with McClellan on-board about 3:30 pm, and it is unlikely it participated in the salvo before that.)—which began lobbing missiles twenty inches (510 mm) in length and eight inches (200 mm) in diameter from their position on the James River onto the battlefield. The explosions and impacts of the gunboat fire impressed the Confederate troops, but the guns' aim was unreliable, and the large shells did considerably less damage than might have been expected.

==== Hill's charge ====
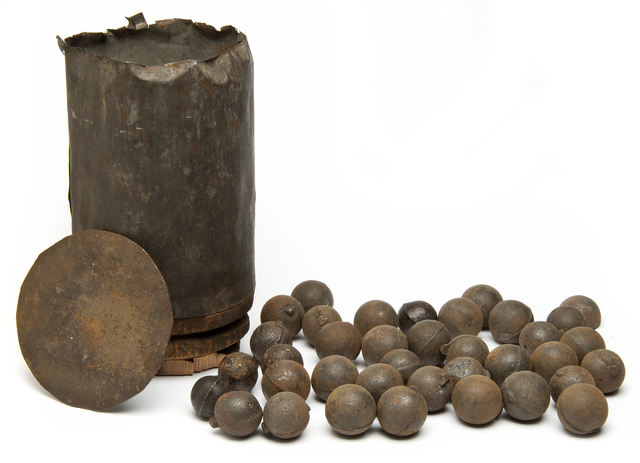
Artillery antipersonnel shot-canister for a 12-pounder (5.4 kg) cannon from the Civil War era

D. H. Hill had been discouraged by the failure of the Confederate artillery, and asked Stonewall Jackson to supplement Chilton's draft. Jackson's response was that Hill should obey the original orders: charge with a yell after Armistead's brigade did so. No yell was heard for hours, and Hill's men began building bivouac shelters to sleep in. Around 6 pm Hill and his five brigade commanders (Note: By that point in the Seven Days Battles, Hill's brigade commanders were Col. John B. Gordon, Col. Charles C. Tew, Brig. Gen. Samuel Garland, Col. Alfred H. Colquitt and Brig. Gen. Roswell S. Ripley.) had assumed that the lack of a signal meant their army would not attempt any assault. They were conferring together about Chilton's order when they heard yells and the commotion of a charge from their right flank, roughly where Armistead was supposed to be. (Note: Wright's men gave a rebel yell as they charged, and Armistead's men also gave a yell of encouragement when they saw Wright and Mahone's advancing.) Hill took the yell as the signal and shouted to his commanders, "That must be the general advance. Bring up your brigades as soon as possible and join in it." D. H. Hill's five brigades, with some 8,200 men, had to contend with the dense woodlands around the Quaker Road and Western Run, which destroyed any order they may have had. Men advanced out of the woods towards the Union line in five separate, uncoordinated attacks, and each brigade charged up the hill alone: "We crossed one fence, went through another piece of woods, then over another fence [and] into an open field on the other side of which was a long line of Yankees", wrote William Calder of the 2nd Regiment, North Carolina Infantry. "Our men charged gallantly at them. The enemy mowed us down by fifties." Some brigades in Hill's division made it close enough to exchange musket fire and engage in hand-to-hand combat, but these were driven back. The artillery response on the Federal side to Hill's charge was particularly withering, and soon, Hill's men needed support just to hold their ground. In Extraordinary Circumstances: The Seven Days Battles, Brian K. Burton called Hill's charge "unnecessary and costly". The successive assaults of Hill's brigades on the well-entrenched Federals were short-lived, and achieved little.

==== Final assaults ====
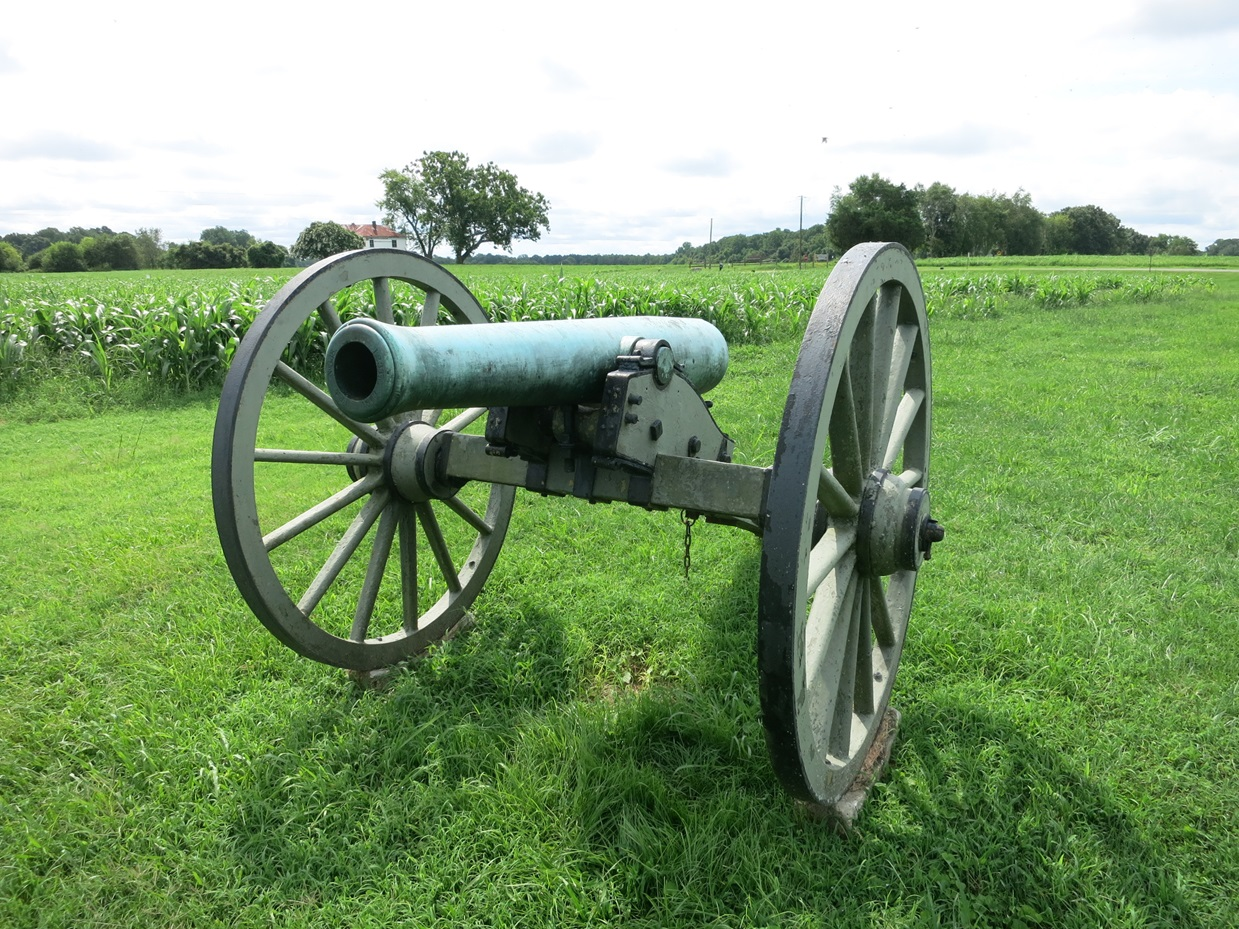
12-lb Napoleon is positioned west of Willis Church Road with the Thomas J. West House visible above the wheel on the left.

Preceding attacks by Lee's army had done barely anything to accomplish Confederate objectives, but this did not deter Magruder, who rode back and forth across the battlefield, calling for reinforcements and personally launching unit after unit into a charge of the Union line. At this point, men who had always been directly under Magruder's command began to join the battle. Magruder first encountered some units of Brig. Gen. Robert Toombs. With Toombs's brigade widely dispersed, the individual units Magruder found were not with Toombs himself. Magruder personally led the men in a short-lived charge, followed by a disordered retreat. Other units nominally under Toombs's command appeared, charged and retreated at various times throughout the next few hours, with little or no organization. The brigades of Col. George T. Anderson and Col. William Barksdale emerged from the woods to the right of Toombs, but as they did so, Anderson's men also became separated, as the left side outpaced the right. This created an advance with two of Anderson's regiments on the far Confederate left next to Toombs, Barksdale's men in the middle, and three more Anderson regiments on the far right, near the remnants of Wright and Mahone. Anderson's right flank charged, but made it no farther than the foot of the hill before breaking and retreating under a hail of antipersonnel artillery. Anderson's left flank never charged. Barksdale's brigade charged at roughly the same time, and made it considerably farther up the hill, engaging the Union infantry of Brig. Gen. Daniel Butterfield in a firefight that lasted more than an hour.

Lee received Magruder's calls for reinforcement and instructed Huger to let Ransom go support the men trapped on the field of battle. He also sent orders to the brigades of Brig. Gens. Joseph B. Kershaw and Paul Jones Semmes, in Maj. Gen. Lafayette McLaws's division within Magruder's command. Robert Ransom's unit, after they finally showed up with Huger's permission, first attempted to charge straight up the hill, following the path of other Confederate brigades attempting to aid Magruder. When this proved useless, Ransom ordered them to regroup in the woods to the Confederate right, march double-time a half a mile in a hook to the right around all the other Confederate units and attack the far Union western flank. While Ransom was angling west, Jackson responded to a request for reinforcement from D. H. Hill by sending forward brigades from his own command to move from the east into the area where D. H. Hill had attacked. From his own division Jackson sent Brig. Gens. Alexander Lawton and Charles S. Winder, and from Ewell's division, Brig. Gen. Isaac R. Trimble and Cols. Leroy A. Stafford and Jubal Early. Brig. Gen John R. Jones was wounded in the hand and command of his brigade went to Lt. Col Richard Cunningham of the 48th Virginia, who had commanded the brigade a few days earlier while Jones was on sick leave.

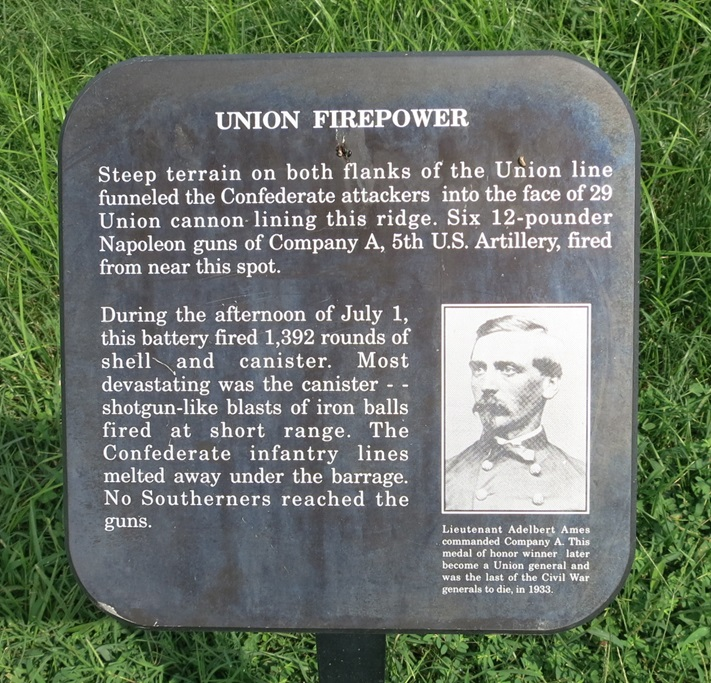
Marker at Malvern Hill Battlefield for Battery A, 5th US Artillery commanded by Lieutenant Adelbert Ames.

Ransom's men managed to come closer to the Union line than any Confederates that day, guided by the flashing light of the cannons amidst an encroaching darkness; however, George Sykes's artillery repelled that attack. The brigades of Kershaw and Semmes, sent earlier by Lee, arrived to the front while Ransom was moving to attack in another position. Semmes and Kershaw were quickly sent in; they too were repulsed not long after. Semmes was west of the junction of Carter's Mill Road and Willis Church Road, in the vicinity of Barksdale, Mahone and Wright. Semmes made the final charge of the day west of these roads, and like the charges before, it was to little effect. Kershaw angled east, in the area where Toombs, Anderson and Cobb had attacked. This was an area of great confusion. Kershaw's troops arrived ahead of all the reinforcements sent by Jackson, and took fire from both friendly and hostile forces: from Confederates behind them firing wildly and Federals in front firing effectively. Kershaw's men retreated in rout. The brigades behind Kershaw charged incoherently, with some men pushing forward, and others getting separated from their units or confused when they encountered groups of retreating Confederates. Disorganized, retreating soldiers from various units were so numerous they slowed Jackson's men to nearly a standstill. Jackson's unit commanders attempted to organize their various regiments and rally the retreaters to join in, but it was all to very little effect. A few units fought fiercely against Union infantry and artillery. In particular, three regiments of Kershaw's brigade made it close enough to Union lines to engage in hand-to-hand combat with the troops of Brig. Gen. Daniel Sickles before being driven back. As the sun was starting to go down, Brig. Gen Isaac Trimble began to move his brigade forward. Stonewall Jackson asked him what he was planning to do. "I am going to charge those batteries, sir!" Trimble answered. "I guess you'd better not try it. General D.H. Hill has just tried with his entire division and been repulsed. I guess you'd better not try it," Jackson replied.

Night was falling, however, and eventually all these troops were ordered to merely hold their positions without charging. In the end, the charges of Semmes and Kershaw were the last coherent Confederate actions, and neither was successful. Brig. Gen. Porter summed up the Confederate infantry charges at Malvern Hill this way:

As if moved by a reckless disregard of life equal to that displayed at Gaines' Mill, with a determination to capture our army, or destroy it by driving us into the river, brigade after brigade rushed at our batteries, but the artillery of both Morell and Couch mowed them down with shrapnel, grape, and canister, while our infantry, withholding their fire until the enemy were in short range, scattered the remnants of their columns, sometimes following them up and capturing prisoners and colors.

With the infantry part of the battle over, Union artillery continued to boom across the hill. They stopped firing at 8:30 pm, leaving a wreath of smoke upon the crest's edge, and ending the action on Malvern Hill.

== Aftermath ==
=== Casualties ===
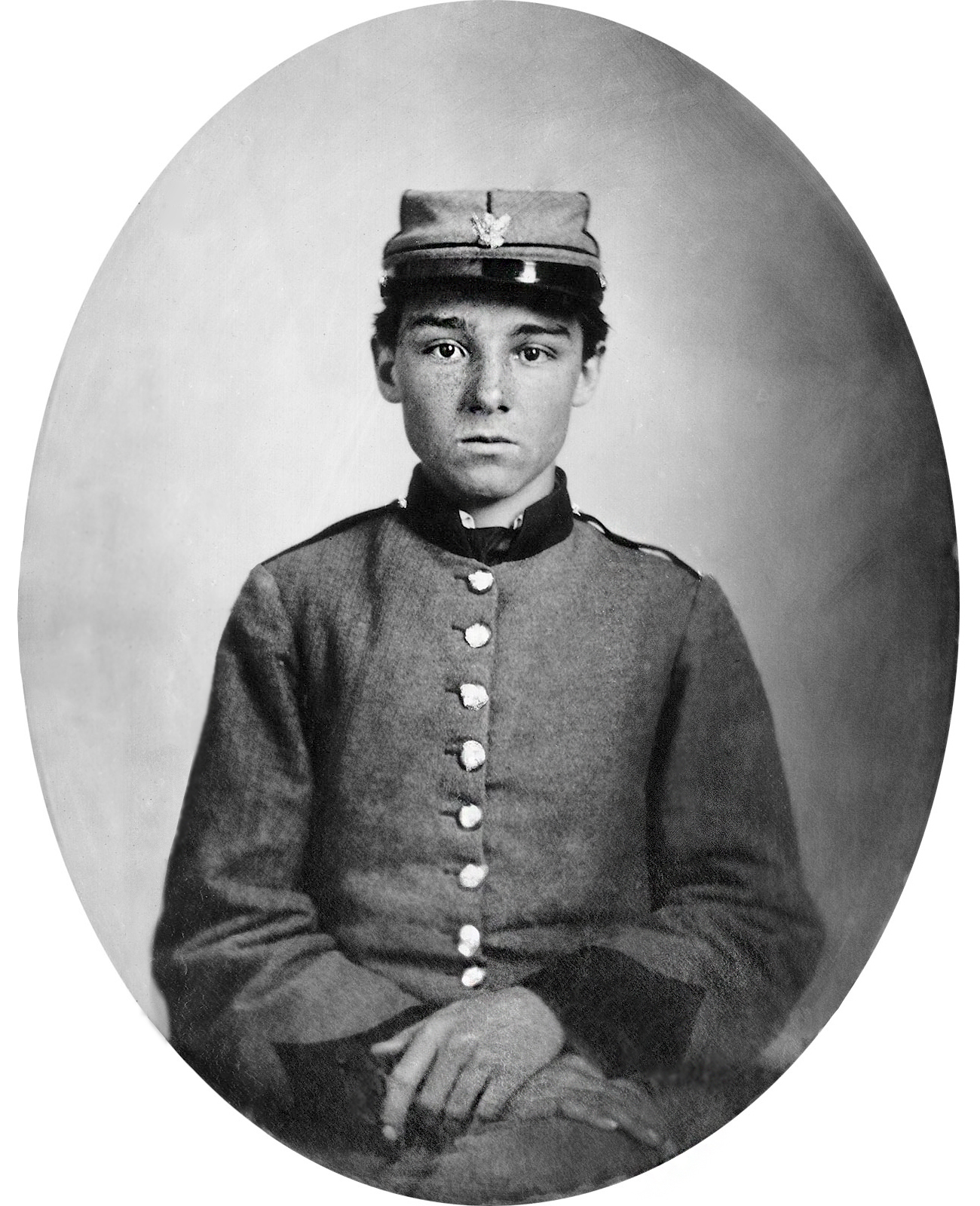
Seventeen-year-old Confederate soldier Edwin Francis Jemison was one of those killed in the battle.

The human toll of the Battle of Malvern Hill and the Seven Days Battles was shown clearly as both capitals, Washington and Richmond, set up numerous provisional hospitals to care for the dead, wounded and missing. Ships sailed from the Peninsula to Washington carrying the wounded. Richmond was nearest to the battlefields of the Seven Days, and the immense number of casualties overwhelmed hospitals and doctors. People from about the Confederacy descended upon Richmond to care for the conflict's casualties. Graves could not be dug quickly enough.

The Confederates counted some 5,650 casualties. Some 30,000 Confederates engaged that day, though several thousand more endured the Union shelling. Whiting's unit suffered 175 casualties in the Malvern Hill conflict, even though they had limited involvement in the assaults. Charles Winder's brigade of just over 1,000 men suffered 104 casualties in their short involvement in the battle. D. H. Hill spent days removing the wounded, burying the dead and cleaning up the battlefield, with help from Magruder and Huger's units. One of D. H. Hill's brigades lost 41% of its strength at Malvern Hill alone. He later estimated that more than half of all the Confederate killed and wounded at Malvern Hill were as a result of artillery fire. Two Confederate generals were wounded, Brig. Gens George B. Anderson and John R. Jones. No Union officers above the regimental level were killed or wounded.

=== Reasons for outcome ===
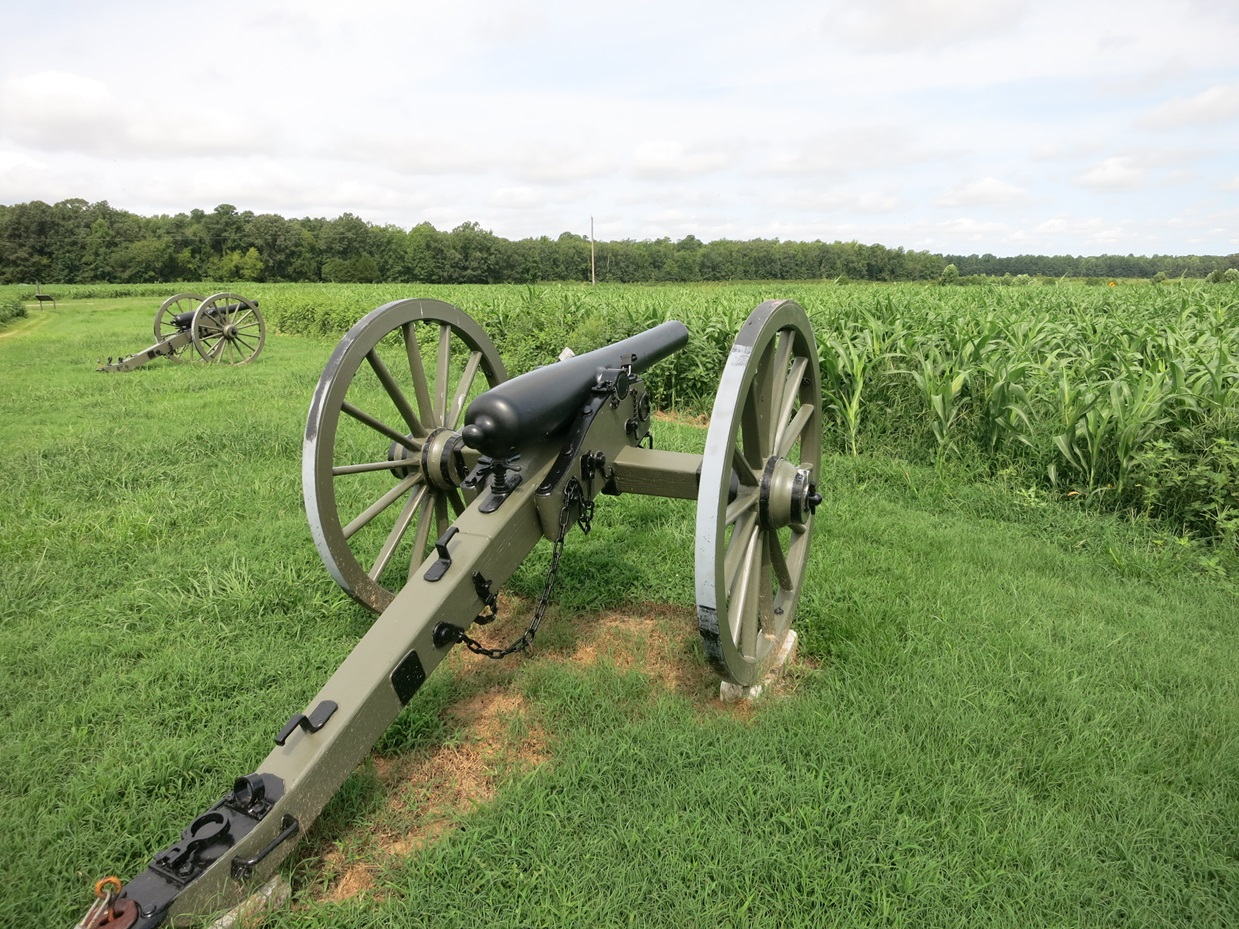
Two 3-inch Ordnance rifles mark the Union position east of the Willis Church Road, facing north toward the Confederate attackers.

The battle on Malvern Hill was a resounding Union tactical victory. The victory was due in no small part to Henry Hunt, the Union chief artillerist, who did proficient work in accumulating and concentrating the Union guns. Troop placement before the battle by the army's principal topographical engineer, Col. A. A. Humphreys, was also carried out capably. The ground on Malvern Hill was used effectively and the Union line had depth with a healthy amount of rested troops available to defend it. Fitz John Porter, the de facto commander for the day, played an important role in this. He posted his men well on June 30, and stationed reinforcements near to the Union line. Darius Couch, whose forces comprised half of the Union center, positioned his reinforcements skilfully as well and cooperated with George Morell, whose units formed the other part of the Union middle. The infantrymen performed well also. As Brian K. Burton notes, "[the infantrymen] stayed behind the guns most of the time and did not advance too far during countercharges. This behavior allowed the gunners a clear field of fire." Furthermore, if more of anything was needed, infantry or artillery, it was available. (Note: At Gaines's Mill, nearly all men fought that day. At Malvern Hill, the III Corps, with some 10,000 men, was entirely unused. Moreover, about 10,000 men from the II Corps were close at hand to support the Union line if needed, and some 38 guns were still in reserve by the end of the day, having not fired a single round of ammunition.) At the forefront of the Union victory, however, was the overwhelming firepower of their artillery, as later accounts by soldiers from both armies repeatedly attested.

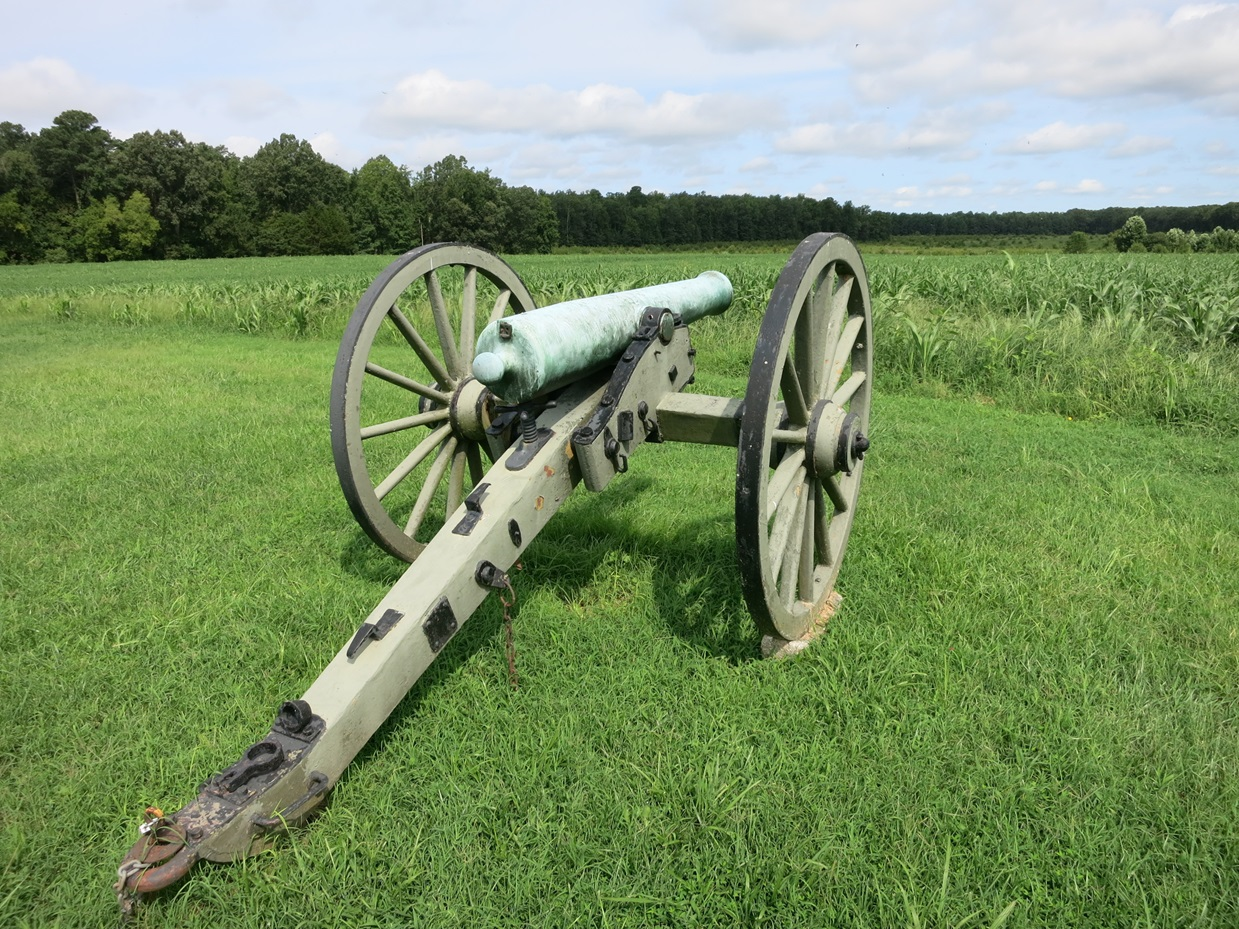
12-pounder Napoleon is located west of the Willis Church Road, facing north.

A number of shortcomings in planning and execution contributed to the debacle suffered by the Confederates. The Confederate brigade leaders performed well, with the exception of a few minor instances; Burton surmises that the blame of July 1 must lie with the overall commanders. Longstreet was overconfident about the artillery strategy, which proved less effective than it could have been largely because of problems gathering the artillery for the assault. The Confederate practice of moving artillery with individual units instead of in one mass and the difficult terrain surrounding Malvern Hill contributed to this issue. A potential solution to this problem lay with Brig. Gen. William N. Pendleton's fourteen batteries in reserve. However, Lee's headquarters never contacted Pendleton, who spent July 1 "await[ing] events and orders, in readiness for whatever service might be called for." These orders never came, and Pendleton's batteries went unused. Magruder might also share in the blame; his late arrival to the battlefield was caused by bad maps and faulty guides. Since Magruder received Chilton's draft late in the day, and with no time attached to it, there was no way for him to determine the relevance of the order. Burton suggests that Magruder cannot be reasonably blamed for his attacks on the Union line: he was responding to Lee's orders and did initially try to form a unified attack on the Union line. Finally, Magruder was riding back and forth across the battlefield, making it difficult for him to be found by junior officers seeking guidance. Several other factors may have played into the Confederate repulse, including Theophilus Holmes's refusal to participate in the battle, dismissing any notion of actively engaging the enemy.

Lee's part in the Confederate defeat at Malvern Hill has been criticized by historians. Though he put rested troops on the field and accepted Longstreet's suggestions, which did not commit him to a charge, Lee himself was not present on the battlefield to observe the fighting. Historian Stephen Sears points out that Lee's ineffective communication with his generals and apparent failure to write his own communications to his brigadier generals (instead leaving orders open to interpretation) may have contributed to the defeat. Lee could also have countermanded Chilton's orders when it became apparent they were fruitless, or verified the "success" of Armistead. Consequently, Lee must also share blame in the repeated lack of coordination of attacks throughout the day.

=== Subsequent events ===
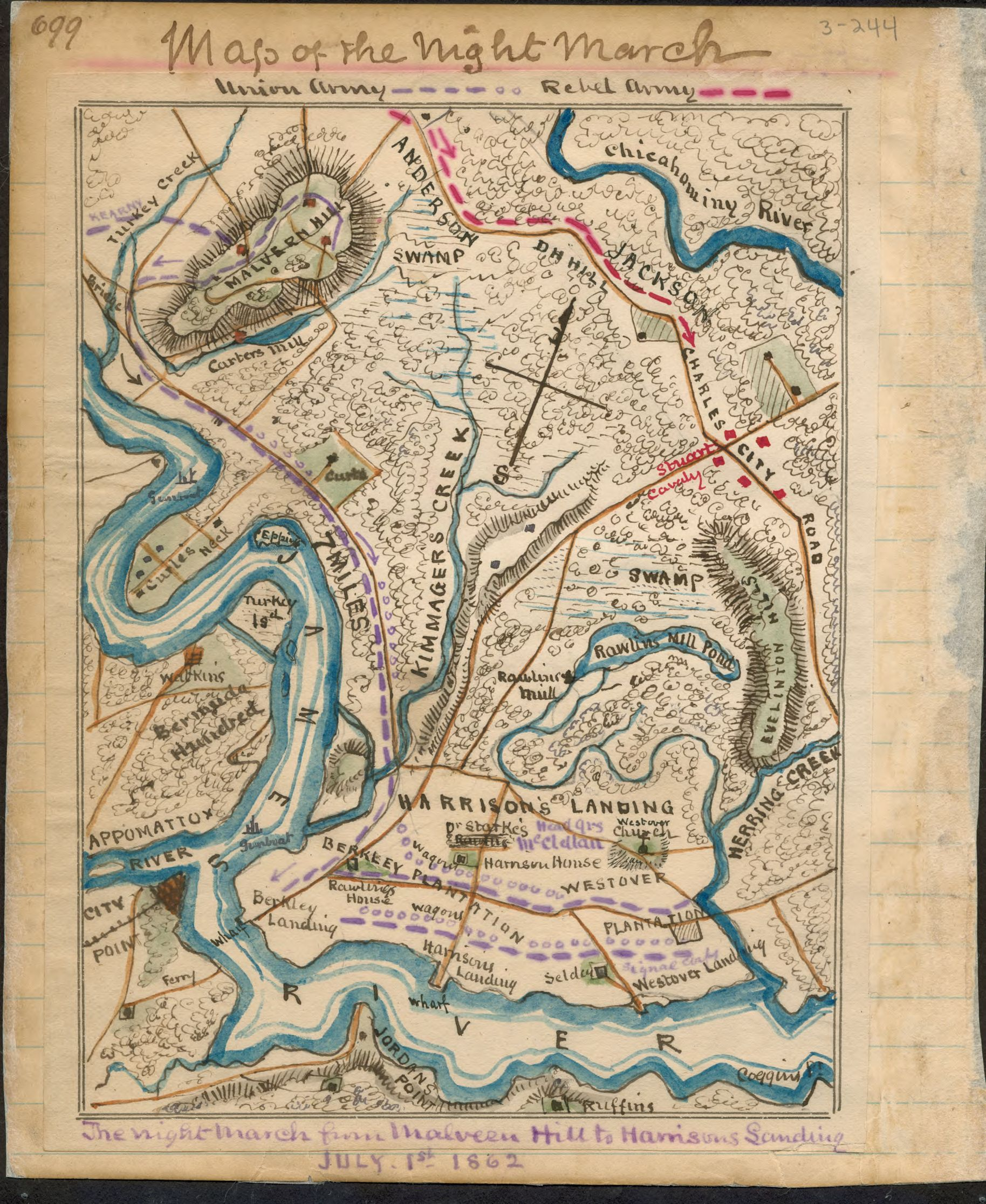
Map of the night march from Malvern Hill to Harrison's Landing; by Pvt. Robert K. Sneden of Brig. Gen. Heintzelman's III Corps. Union Army indicated in purple; Confederates or "Rebels" indicated in red.

Despite the strength of Malvern Hill, as demonstrated in the battle, McClellan felt he needed to continue with his planned withdrawal to Harrison's Landing, to Fitz John Porter's chagrin. Porter felt the Army of the Potomac should remain atop the hill or perhaps even continue their advance to Richmond. McClellan however insisted that Confederate troops greatly outnumbered his own, felt he could not protect Harrison's Landing from his current position at Malvern Hill, and feared being cut off from his supply depot. McClellan's mentality prevailed. The Union batteries and McClellan's engineers began moving to Harrison's Landing soon after the end of the Battle of Malvern Hill. Starting at about 11 p.m. unit after unit began to follow. Within hours, nearly all of McClellan's Army of the Potomac was marching towards Harrison's Landing. Once the last of these men had crossed the Turkey Island Bridge, they destroyed the bridge and felled trees over it to stymie any pursuit, leaving the James River between the Union and Confederate armies.

The areas around Malvern Hill hosted much of Lee's army the night after the battle. Some of the Confederates were close enough to hear the sounds made by the Army of the Potomac retreating under cover of darkness, and see the lanterns of Northerners helping their wounded. The day after the Battle of Malvern Hill, Lee and Stonewall Jackson met President Jefferson Davis at Poindexter farm. They considered immediately pursuing McClellan; however, in view of the rain and confusion, Davis and Lee deemed large-scale pursuit of McClellan's army too risky. Jackson disagreed, saying, "They have not all got away if we go immediately after them." Jackson even had the bodies of the dead moved so his soldiers had a clear line of attack when pursuing McClellan. However, Davis and Lee thought it necessary to rest the army. They did not completely rule out a pursuit though; Lee even ordered J. E. B. Stuart to reconnoiter McClellan's position for future attacks. Lee ordered Theophilus Holmes to move to Drewry's Bluff, and decided to keep the men on Malvern Hill through July 3 to forestall any potential Union attack against that location.

On July 4, 1862, Lee's men began marching towards Harrison's Landing. He made his headquarters a few miles north of Evelington Heights, a sixty-foot (18 m) elevation approximately thirteen miles (21 km) from Harrison's Landing, and stayed nearby with his army for several days, searching for weaknesses in the Union line at the heights that might allow for an attack. No weakness presented itself though, and by the end of July 8, the entire Army of Northern Virginia, save for cavalry stations and picket forces, was back near Richmond. The Peninsula Campaign was over.

=== Reactions and effects ===
Despite the defeat on Malvern Hill, the Seven Days Battles accomplished the original Confederate goal of removing any direct threat to Richmond from the Union Army. The three newspapers in Richmond exulted in this strategic victory and lionized Robert E. Lee as a national hero: "No captain that ever lived," opined the Richmond Dispatch, "could have planned or executed a better plan." Similarly, Confederate Navy Secretary Stephen Mallory said, "the Great McClelland [sic] the young Napoleon now like a whipped cur lies on the banks of the James River crouched under his Gun Boats." Throughout Richmond and the once-beleaguered South, there was a triumphant mood, and scant attention was paid to the flaws in Lee's tactics or execution.

Lee was not exultant, but "deeply, bitterly disappointed" at the result. "Our success has not been as great or complete as we should have desired", Lee wrote to his wife. In his official report, he wrote, "Under ordinary circumstances, the Federal Army should have been destroyed." The North Carolinian D. H. Hill shared Lee's bitterness, and wrote that the "blood of North Carolina poured like water". In a post-war article he wrote that the battle "was not war; it was murder." Lee did not distribute blame for the failure to reach his desired result, but there were repercussions. Several commanders were reassigned, including Theophilus Holmes and John Magruder, and his army was reorganized into two wings, one under Stonewall Jackson and another under James Longstreet. Further, Confederate artillery would now be moved in battalion-sized units, at the head of Confederate columns.

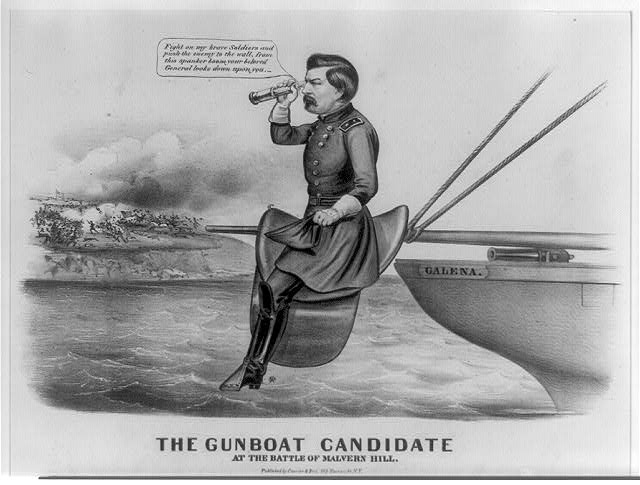
An 1864 newspaper cartoon of McClellan on the USS Galena, labelled "The Gunboat Candidate". McClellan was harshly criticized during his 1864 presidential campaign for his placement during the Battle of Malvern Hill. The dialogue box reads: "Fight on my brave Soldiers and push the enemy to the wall, from this spanker boom your beloved General looks down upon you."

In McClellan's case, his success on Malvern Hill was overshadowed by his overall defeat in the Seven Days Battles. The Northern public met McClellan's defeat with despondency, and his reputation was tarnished. Some of McClellan's soldiers voiced their continued confidence in him. Such opinions were not unanimous, however; one of McClellan's engineers, Lt. William Folwell, wondered why "they deify a General whose greatest feat has been a masterly retreat." A similar opinion was shared by many others in the rank and file of the Union military. Some in politics also abandoned the Democratic McClellan. He was also accused of being on the Galena during the Battle of Malvern Hill, and newspapers and tabloids around the country heaped scorn on him for this, especially when he ran for president in 1864. President Lincoln was also losing faith in McClellan. On June 26, the day of Lee's first offensive during the Seven Days, the Army of Virginia was formed and the command given to Maj. Gen. John Pope. While McClellan was at Harrison's Landing, parts of his Army of the Potomac were continuously reassigned to Pope. Pope and his Army of Virginia left for Gordonsville, Virginia on July 14, setting the stage for the subsequent Northern Virginia Campaign.

In his Battle-Pieces publication, Herman Melville penned a poem about the battle, titled with the same name as the hill on which it was fought. In the poem, Melville questions the elms of Malvern Hill of whether they recall "the haggard beards of blood" the day of the battle.

== Battlefield preservation ==
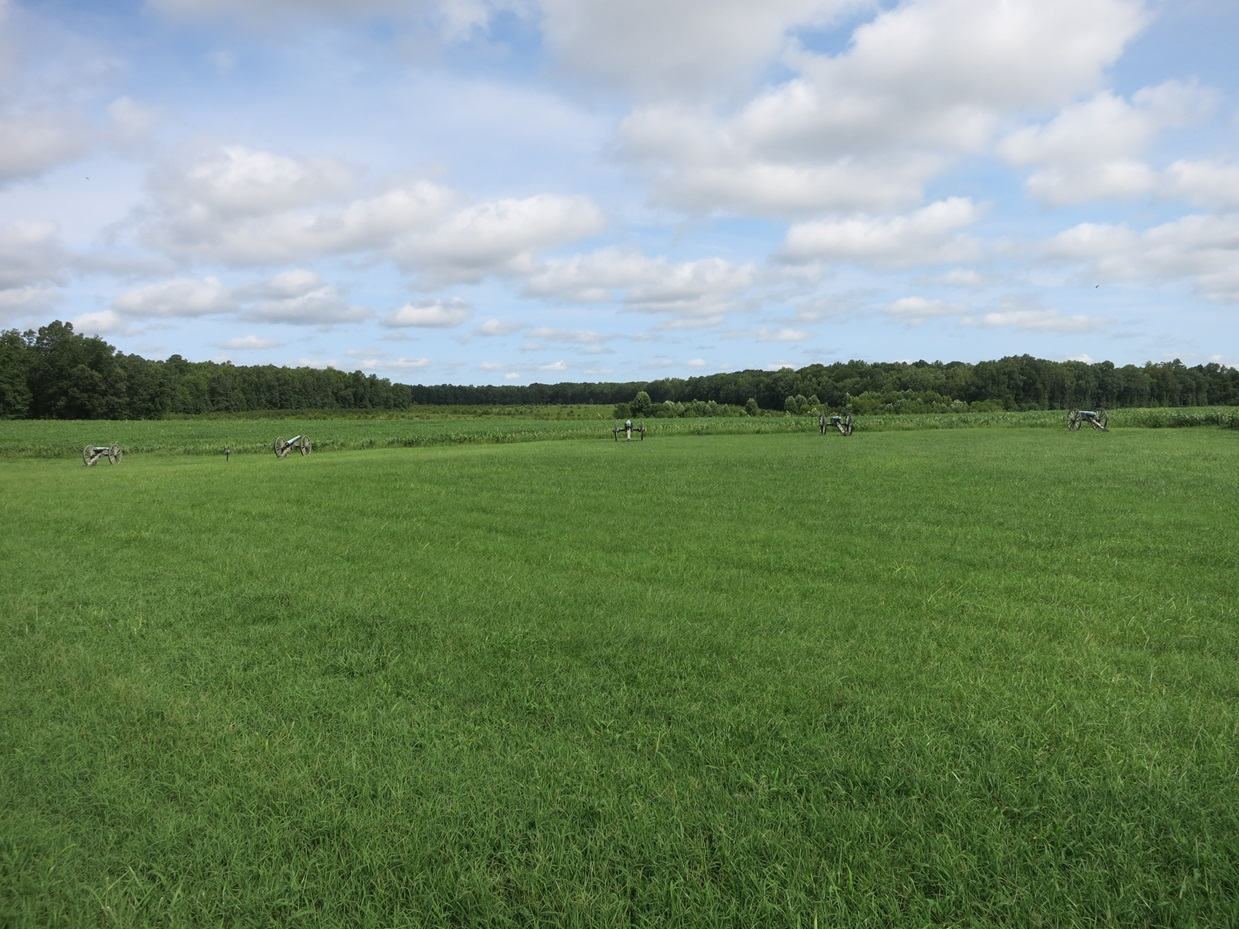
Five of six 12-pounder Napoleons on the west side of the Willis Church Road face to the north at Malvern Hill.

The National Park Service has called the battlefield at Malvern Hill "the best preserved Civil War battlefield in central or southern Virginia".

Most recent preservation efforts there have represented cooperation between Richmond National Battlefield Park and the American Battlefield Trust, formerly known as The Civil War Trust. The American Battlefield Trust and its land preservation partners have acquired and preserved 1,441 acres (5.83 km^{2}) of the battlefield in more than six transactions from 1994 through November 2021. Its efforts have been bolstered by the Virginia Land Conservation Fund, the Association for the Preservation of Virginia Antiquities, and officials from Henrico County. Most of this tract wraps around the intersection of Willis Church Road and Carter's Mill Road. The land includes the starting point for the Confederate assaults on the day of the battle: the Willis Church Parsonage, the ruins of which remain visible today. As of 2005, the National Park Service reported that 1,332.5 acres (5.392 km^{2}) of land was protected on and around Malvern Hill to preserve the battlefield. Driving and walking tours, among other services, are offered at the site.

In August 2016, the 871-acre (352 ha) Malvern Hill Farm was listed for sale for $10.6 million by the descendants of William H. Ferguson Sr. (1885–1984). It was purchased by the non-profit Capital Region Land Conservancy (CRLC) in February 2018 for $6.6 million. CRLC subsequently recorded conservation easements to protect 465 acres (188 ha) with the Virginia Department of Historic Resources and 25 acres (10 ha) with the Virginia Outdoors Foundation. Portions of the property were then given to Henrico County for the future site of an open space area for education and passive recreation as well as the James River Association for a canoe and kayak launch into Turkey Island Creek, which flows into the James River at Presquile National Wildlife Refuge. Capital Region Land Conservancy is holding the remaining 380 acres (150 ha) to be included into the National Park Service Richmond National Battlefield Park.

== See also ==
- List of American Civil War battles
- List of costliest American Civil War land battles
- List of Virginia Civil War units
- Richmond in the Civil War
- Troop engagements of the American Civil War, 1862
- Virginia in the American Civil War
- USAV Malvern Hill, US Army ship named after this battle

== Sources ==
- Abbott, John Stevens Cabot (2012) [1866]. The history of the Civil War in America: comprising a full and impartial account of the origin and progress of the rebellion, of the various naval and military engagements, of the heroic deeds performed by armies and individuals, and of touching scenes in the field, the camp, the hospital, and the cabin. Charleston, South Carolina: Gale, Sabin Americana. ISBN 978-1-275-83646-4.
- Burton, Brian K. (2010). Extraordinary Circumstances: The Seven Days Battles. Bloomington, Indiana: Indiana University Press. ISBN 978-0-253-10844-9.
- Dougherty, Kevin (2010). The Peninsula Campaign of 1862: A Military Analysis. Jackson, Mississippi: University Press of Mississippi. ISBN 978-1-60473-061-6.
- Eicher, David J. (2002). The Longest Night: A Military History of the Civil War. London: Simon and Schuster. ISBN 0-7432-1846-9.
- Freeman, Douglas S. (1936). R. E. Lee: A Biography, Volume 2. New York: C. Scribner's Sons. ISBN 0-6841-5483-8.
- Freeman, Douglas S. (2001). Lee's Lieutenants: A Study in Command. New York: Simon & Schuster. ISBN 0-6848-5979-3.
- Hattaway, Herman (1997). Shades of Blue and Gray: An Introductory Military History of the Civil War. Columbia, Missouri: University of Missouri Press. ISBN 0-8262-1107-0.
- Roland, Charles P. (1995). Reflections on Lee: A Historian's Assessment. Mechanicsburg, Pennsylvania: Stackpole Books. ISBN 0-8117-0719-9.
- Rollyson, Carl E.; Paddock, Lisa O.; Gentry, April (2007). Critical Companion to Herman Melville: A Literary Reference to His Life and Work. New York: Infobase Publishing. ISBN 978-1-4381-0847-6.
- Salmon, John S. (2001). The Official Virginia Civil War Battlefield Guide (illustrated ed.). Mechanicsburg, Pennsylvania: Stackpole Books. ISBN 0-8117-2868-4.
- Sears, Stephen W. (1992). To the Gates of Richmond: The Peninsula Campaign. New York: Ticknor & Fields. ISBN 0-89919-790-6.
- Sears, Stephen W. (2003). Landscape Turned Red: The Battle of Antietam (reprint ed.). New York: Houghton Mifflin Harcourt. ISBN 0-618-34419-5.
- Settles, Thomas M. (2009). John Bankhead Magruder: A Military Reappraisal. Baton Rouge, Louisiana: Louisiana State University Press. ISBN 978-0-807133-91-0.
- Snell, Mark A. (2002). From First to Last: The Life of Major General William B. Franklin (illustrated ed.). New York: Fordham University Press. ISBN 0-8232-2149-0.
- Sweetman, Jack (2002). American Naval History: An Illustrated Chronology of the U.S. Navy and Marine Corps, 1775–present (illustrated ed.). Annapolis, Maryland: Naval Institute Press. ISBN 1-55750-867-4.
- Wise, Jennings Cropper (1991). The Long Arm of Lee: The History of the Artillery of the Army of Northern Virginia, Volume 1: Bull Run to Fredericksburg. Lincoln, Nebraska: University of Nebraska Press. ISBN 0-8032-9733-5.
