= USAV Malvern Hill =

Landing Craft Utility of the Runnymede class

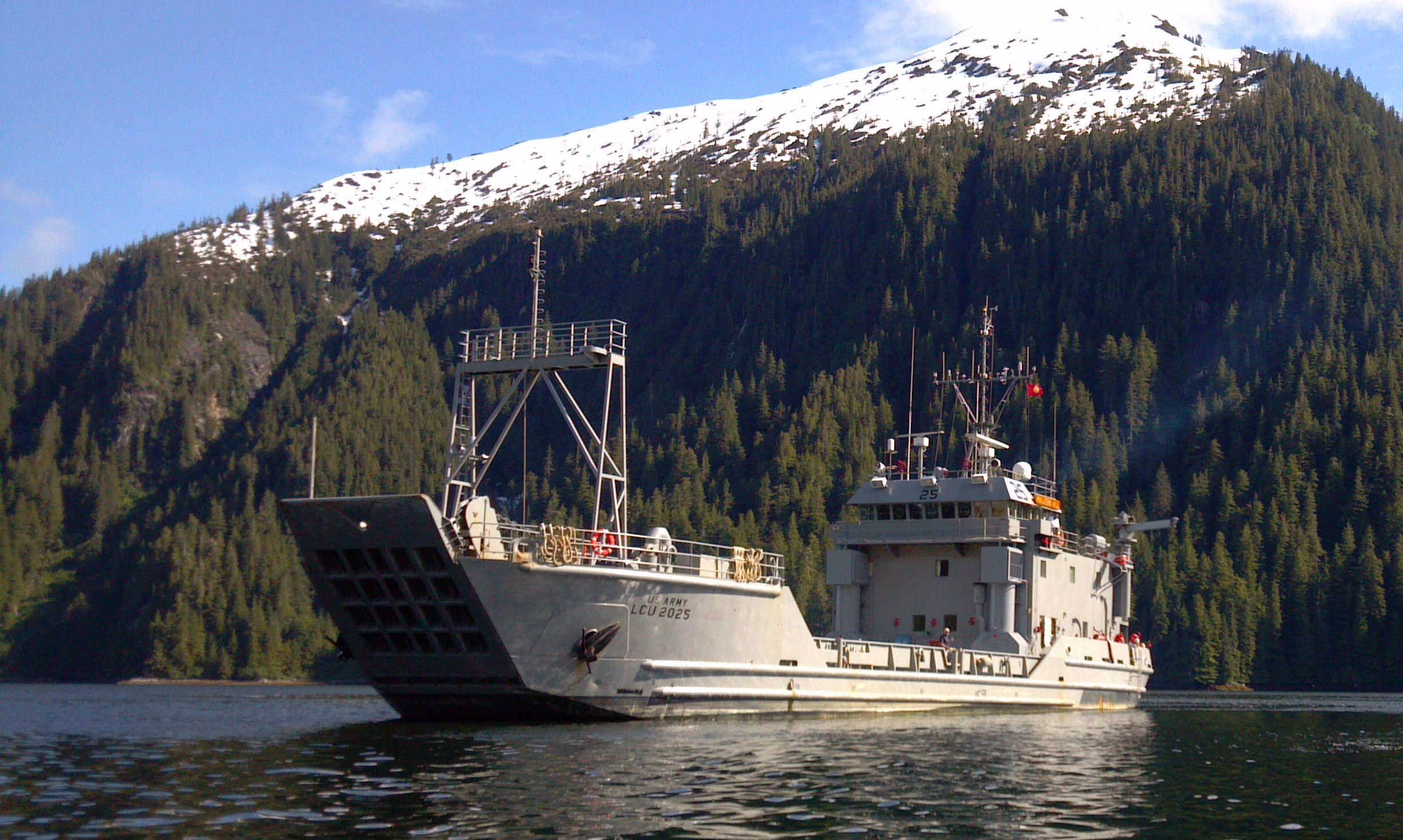
- USAV Malvern Hill on temporary duty in Alaska during USAR summer training 2012

History

United States
- Name: USAV Malvern Hill
- Namesake: battle of Malvern Hill in the U.S. Civil War
- Builder: VT Halter Marine, Gulfport, Mississippi
- Home port: Tacoma, WA
- Identification: MMSI number: 366959000; Callsign: ADMW
- Status: in active service

General characteristics
- Type: Landing Craft Utility
- Displacement: 1,120 long tons (1,138 t)
- Length: 174 ft (53 m)
- Beam: 42 ft (13 m)
- Draft: 8.5 ft (2.6 m)
- Speed: 11.5 knots
- Complement: 2 officers, 10 enlisted

The United States Army Vessel Malvern Hill (LCU 2025) is a Landing Craft Utility of the Runnymede class. Though currently assigned to the 481st Transportation Company (Heavy Boat) (U.S. Army Reserve), which is headquartered in Port Hueneme, California, the craft is berthed in Tacoma, Washington. The vessel's namesake is the battle of Malvern Hill in the U.S. Civil War.
