= Little Haystack Mountain =

Mountain in New Hampshire, United States

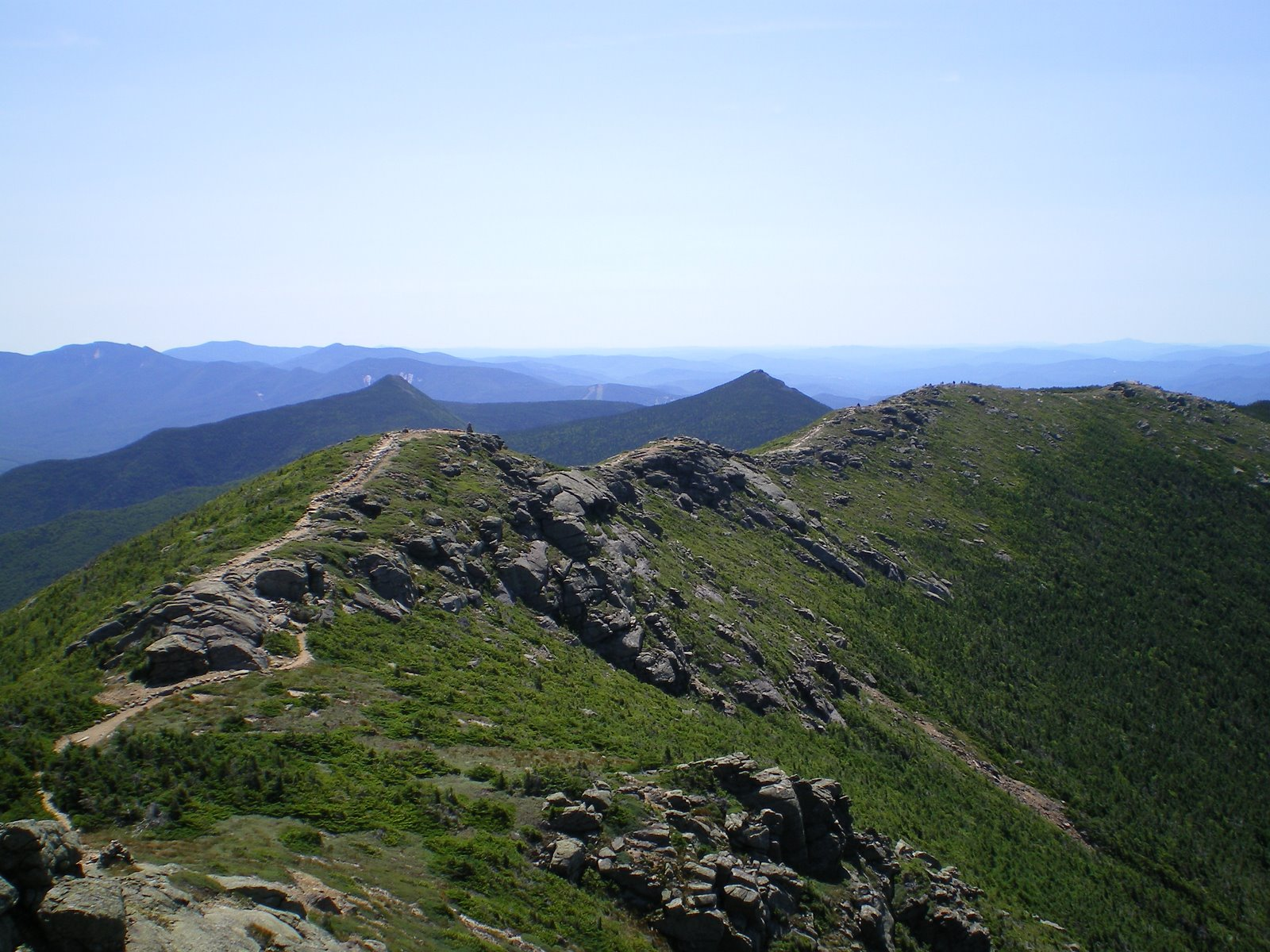
- The Franconia Ridge as seen from Mount Lincoln looking south. Little Haystack is visible down the ridge; Mount Liberty and Mount Flume are visible behind the ridge line.

Highest point
- Elevation: 4760+ ft (1451+ m)
- Prominence: less than 80 feet (24 m)
- Coordinates: 44°08′26″N 71°38′41″W

Geography
- Location: Grafton County, New Hampshire, U.S.
- Parent range: Franconia Range
- Topo map: USGS Franconia

Climbing
- Easiest route: Trail hike

Little Haystack Mountain is a peak on the Franconia Range of the White Mountains located in Grafton County, New Hampshire, United States. It is flanked to the north by Mount Lincoln and to the southwest by Mount Liberty.

The Appalachian Trail, a 2,170-mile (3,490 km) National Scenic Trail from Georgia to Maine, traverses Franconia Ridge, including Little Haystack.

Although well over 4,000 feet (1,200 m) in height, the Appalachian Mountain Club doesn't consider Little Haystack a "four-thousand footer" because it stands less than 200 ft (61 m) above the col on the ridge from Lincoln.

The Falling Waters Trail is the most popular route up Little Haystack Mountain, leading 2.8 miles (4.5 km) from U.S. Route 3 to the summit on the crest of Franconia Ridge. One of the most popular hikes in the Northeastern United States is to traverse the summits of Little Haystack, Lincoln, and Lafayette in a 9-mile (14 km) loop.

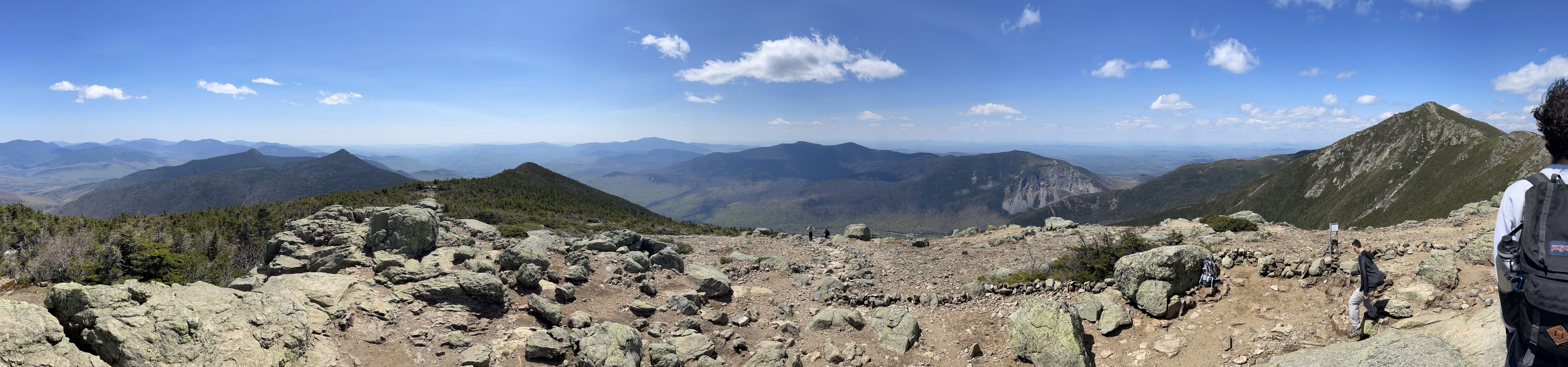
Little Haystack Mountain panorama, looking west. Mount Lafayette and Mount Lincoln are visible at right, with Mount Liberty and Mount Flume visible at left.

== See also ==
- List of mountains in New Hampshire
- White Mountain National Forest
