= Lincoln, New Hampshire =

- Town
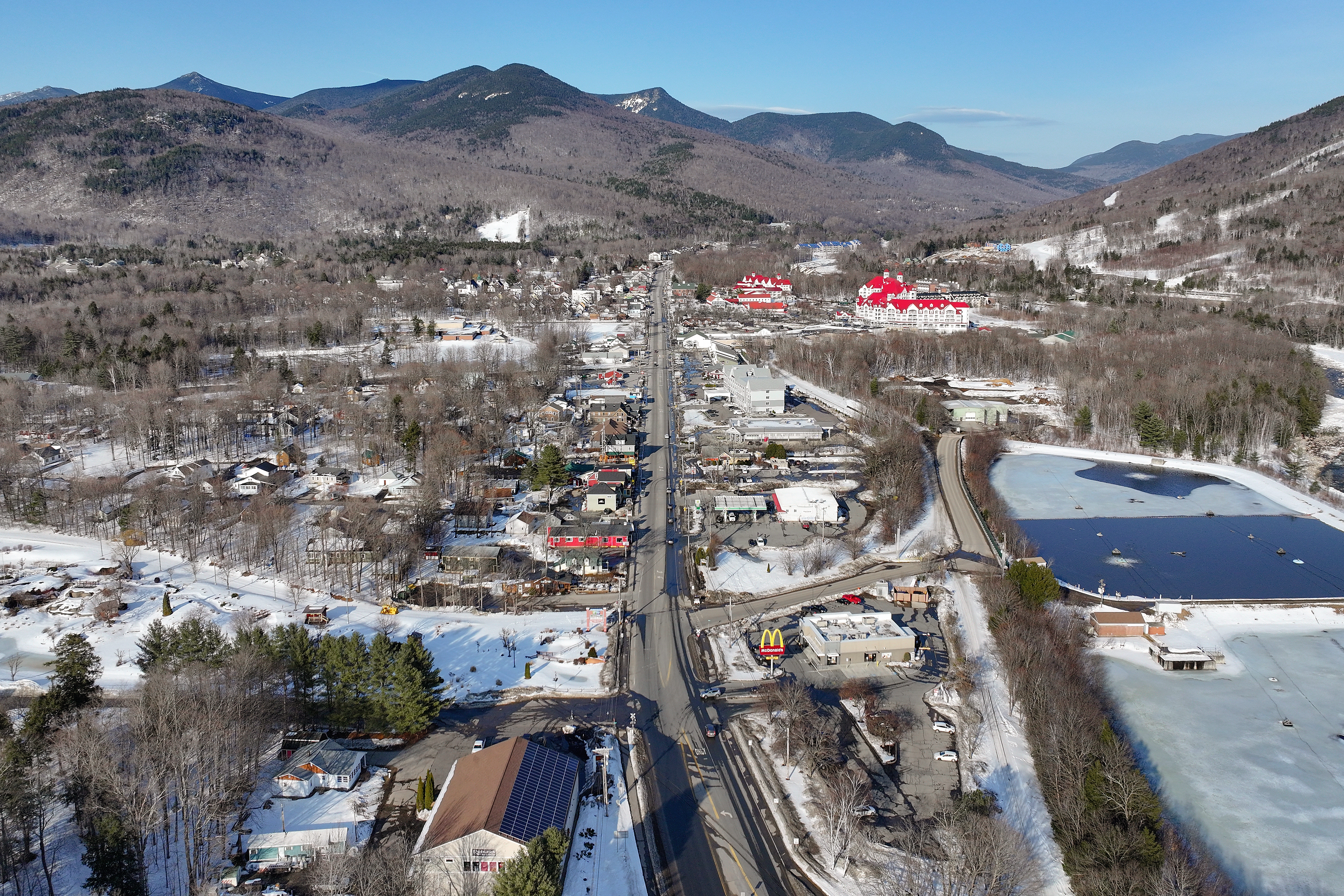
- Main Street (NH Route 112)

- Seal

- Location in Grafton County, New Hampshire
- Coordinates: 44°3′4″N 71°39′26″W
- Country: United States
- State: New Hampshire
- County: Grafton
- Incorporated: 1764

Area
  - Total: 131.0 sq mi (339.3 km^{2})
  - Land: 130.5 sq mi (337.9 km^{2})
  - Water: 0.54 sq mi (1.4 km^{2}) 0.43%
- Elevation: 1,411 ft (430 m)

Population (2020)
  - Total: 1,631
  - Density: 12/sq mi (4.8/km^{2})
- Time zone: UTC-5 (Eastern)
  - Summer (DST): UTC-4 (Eastern)
- ZIP Code: 03251
- Area code: 603
- FIPS code: 33-41860
- GNIS feature ID: 873646
- Website: www.lincolnnh.org

Lincoln is a town in Grafton County, New Hampshire, United States. It is the second-largest town by area in New Hampshire. The population was 1,631 at the 2020 census. The town is home to the New Hampshire Highland Games and to a portion of Franconia Notch State Park. Set in the White Mountains, large portions of the town are within the White Mountain National Forest. The Appalachian Trail crosses the western and northeastern parts of the town. Lincoln is the location of Loon Mountain Ski Resort and associated recreation-centered development.

The primary settlement in town, where 969 people resided at the 2020 census, is defined as the Lincoln census-designated place (CDP) and is located along New Hampshire Route 112 east of Interstate 93. The town also includes the former village sites of Stillwater and Zealand (sometimes known as Pullman) in the town's remote eastern and northern sections respectively, which are now within the White Mountain National Forest.

== History ==
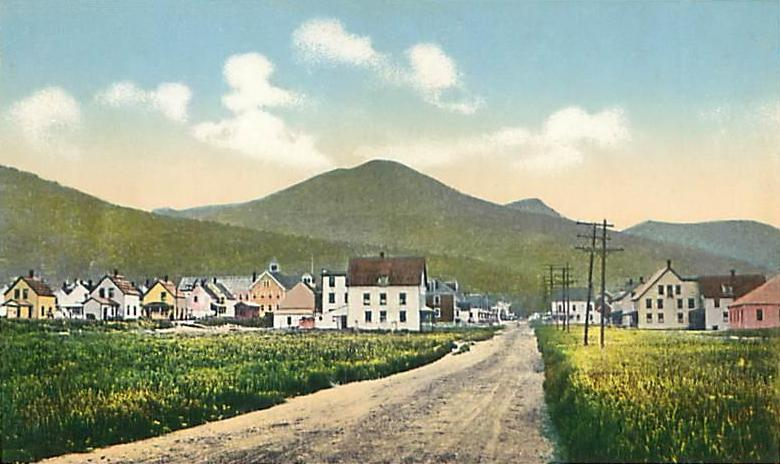
General view c. 1915

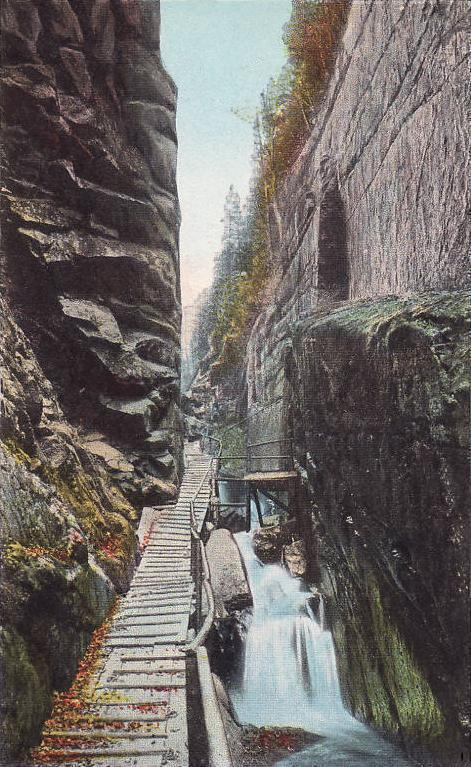
The Flume c. 1915

In 1764, colonial Governor Benning Wentworth granted 32,456 acres (131.34 km^{2}) to a group of approximately 70 land investors from Connecticut. Lincoln was named after Henry Fiennes Pelham-Clinton, 2nd Duke of Newcastle, 9th Earl of Lincoln – a cousin of the Wentworth governors. He held the position of comptroller of customs for the port of London under King George II and George III, which was important to trade between America and England.

The town was settled about 1782. The 1790 census indicates that it had 22 inhabitants. Rocky soil yielded poor farming, but the area's abundant timber, combined with water power to run sawmills on the Pemigewasset River and its East Branch, helped Lincoln develop into a center for logging. By 1853, the Merrimack River Lumber Company was operating. The railroad transported freight, and increasingly brought tourists to the beautiful mountain region. In 1892, James Everell Henry (1831–1912) bought approximately 100,000 acres (400 km^{2}) of virgin timber and established a logging enterprise at what is today the center of Lincoln. In 1902, he built a pulp and paper mill. He erected the Lincoln House hotel in 1903, although a 1907 fire would nearly raze the community. Until he died in 1912, Henry controlled his company town, installing relatives in positions of civic authority.

In 1917, Henry's heirs sold the business to the Parker Young Company, which in turn sold it to the Marcalus Manufacturing Company in 1946. Franconia Paper took over in 1950, producing 150 tons of paper a day until bankruptcy in 1971, at which time new river classification standards discouraged further papermaking in Lincoln.

Tourism is today the principal business. Nearby Loon Mountain has long drawn skiers, and in recent years has attempted to convert itself into a four-season attraction. The Flume is one of the most visited attractions in the state. Discovered in 1808, it is a natural canyon extending 800 feet (240 m) at the base of Mount Liberty. Walls of Conway granite rise to a height of 70 to 90 feet (21 to 27 m) and are only 12 to 20 feet (3.7 to 6.1 m) apart.

== Geography ==
According to the United States Census Bureau, the town has a total area of 131.0 square miles (339.3 km^{2}), of which 130.5 square miles (337.9 km^{2}) are land and 0.54 square miles (1.4 km^{2}) are water, comprising 0.43% of the town. It is the second-largest town in area in New Hampshire, after Pittsburg.

Lincoln is drained by the Pemigewasset River and its East Branch. Lincoln lies almost fully within the Merrimack River watershed, with the western edge of town in the Connecticut River watershed. Kancamagus Pass, elevation 2,860 feet (870 m), is on the Kancamagus Highway at the eastern boundary. The highest point in Lincoln is the summit of Mount Bond at 4,698 ft (1,432 m) above sea level.

== Demographics ==
Historical population
Census	Pop.	Note	%±
1790	22		—
1800	41		86.4%
1810	100		143.9%
1820	32		−68.0%
1830	50		56.3%
1840	76		52.0%
1850	57		−25.0%
1860	71		24.6%
1870	71		0.0%
1880	65		−8.5%
1890	110		69.2%
1900	541		391.8%
1910	1,278		136.2%
1920	1,473		15.3%
1930	1,548		5.1%
1940	1,560		0.8%
1950	1,415		−9.3%
1960	1,228		−13.2%
1970	1,341		9.2%
1980	1,313		−2.1%
1990	1,229		−6.4%
2000	1,271		3.4%
2010	1,662		30.8%
2020	1,631		−1.9%
U.S. Decennial Census

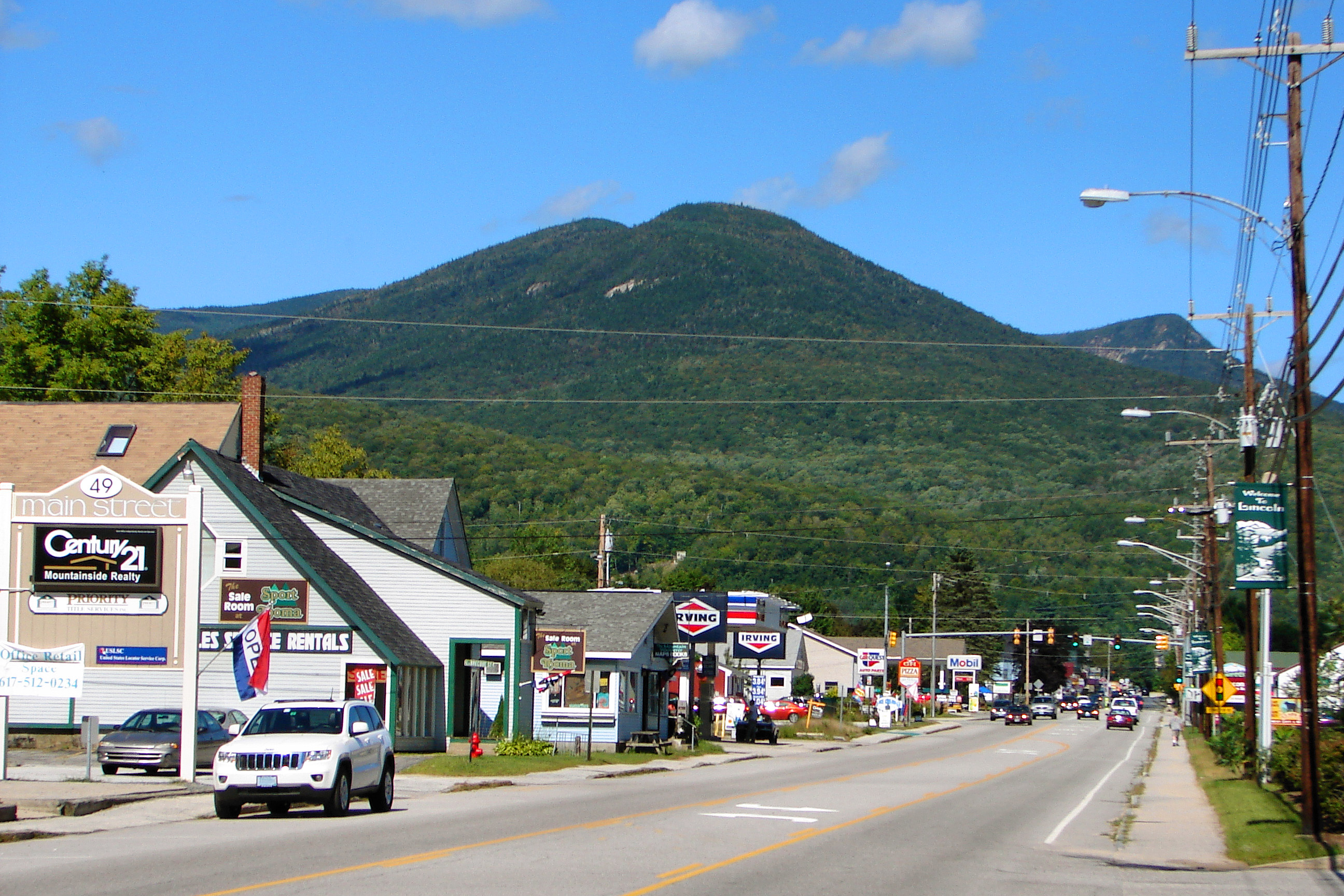
Route 112 thru Lincoln

As of the census of 2010, there were 1,662 people, 794 households, and 439 families residing in the town. There were 2,988 housing units, of which 2,194, or 73.4%, were vacant. 2,083 of the vacant units were for seasonal or recreational use. The racial makeup of the town was 96.9% white, 0.3% African American, 0.1% Native American, 1.7% Asian, 0.0% Native Hawaiian or Pacific Islander, 0.3% some other race, and 0.6% from two or more races. 1.7% of the population were Hispanic or Latino of any race.

Of the 794 households, 21.5% had children under the age of 18 living with them, 43.1% were headed by married couples living together, 7.8% had a female householder with no husband present, and 44.7% were non-families. Of all households, 37.0% were made up of individuals, and 13.4% were someone living alone who was 65 years of age or older. The average household size was 2.09, and the average family size was 2.75.

In the town, 18.7% of the population were under the age of 18, 6.8% were from 18 to 24, 19.4% from 25 to 44, 34.8% from 45 to 64, and 20.4% were 65 years of age or older. The median age was 48.5 years. For every 100 females, there were 105.2 males. For every 100 females age 18 and over, there were 103.3 males.

For the period 2011–2015, the estimated median annual income for a household was $37,095, and the median income for a family was $55,326. Male full-time workers had a median income of $31,106 versus $27,381 for females. The per capita income for the town was $24,109. 21.0% of the population and 9.1% of families were below the poverty line. 20.2% of the population under the age of 18 and 8.6% of those 65 or older were living in poverty.

== Education ==
The town is home to the Lin-Wood Public School.

== Sites of interest ==
- Clark's Bears (formerly Clark's Trading Post)
  - White Mountain Central Railroad
- Franconia Notch State Park, including:
  - Flume Gorge
  - Lonesome Lake
- Granite State Scenic Railway (formerly Hobo Railroad)
- Loon Mountain ski resort
- Whale's Tale Water Park

== See also ==
- White Mountain art
