= Scar Ridge =

Mountain in New Hampshire, United States

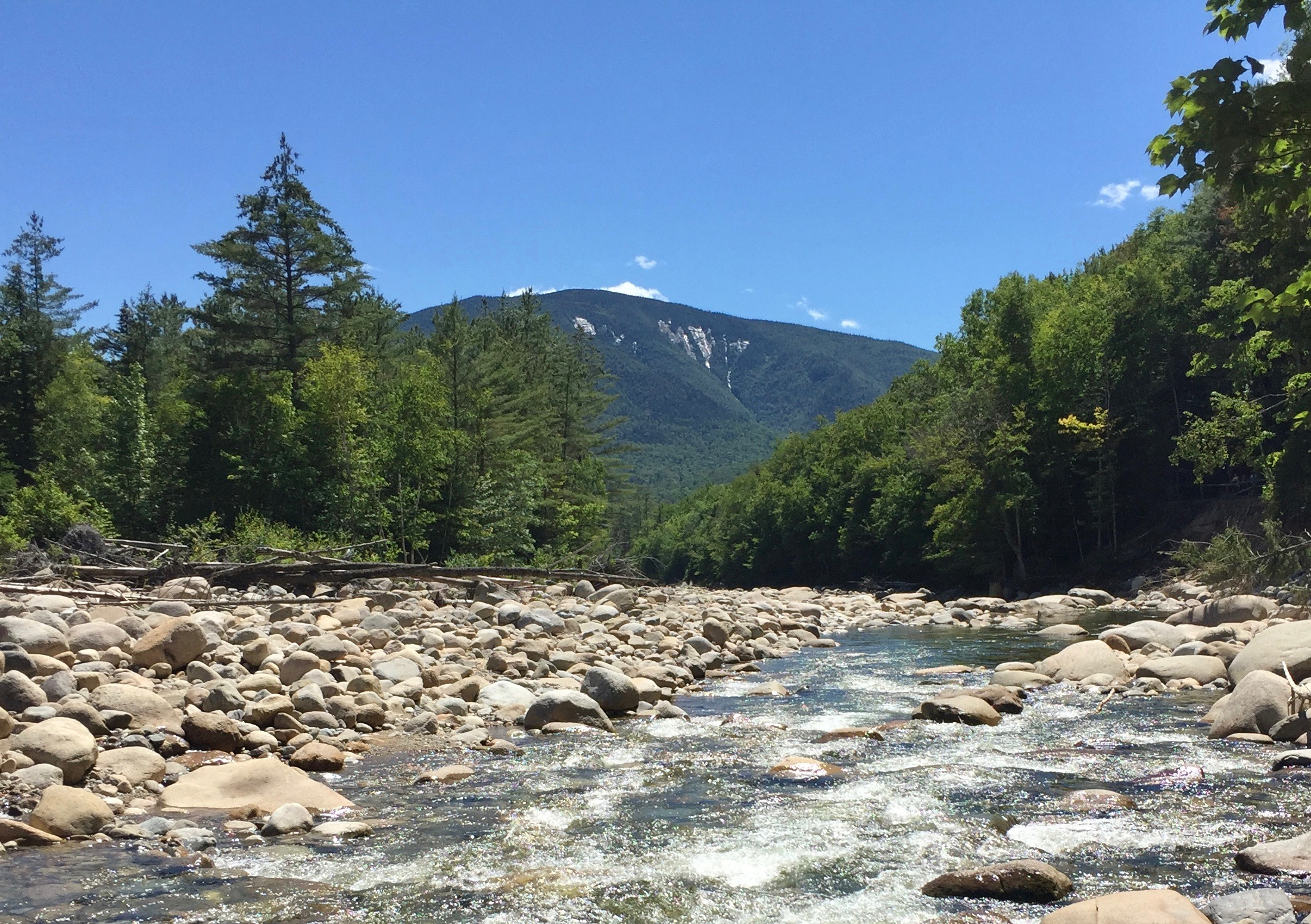
- Scar Ridge as seen from the East Branch Pemigewasset River

Highest point
- Elevation: 3,774 ft (1,150 m)
- Prominence: 654 ft (199 m)
- Listing: #97 New England 100 Highest
- Coordinates: 44°01′43″N 71°35′34″W

Geography
- Location within New Hampshire
- Location: Grafton County, New Hampshire
- Parent range: White Mountains
- Topo map: USGS Mount Osceola

Climbing
- Easiest route: trailless bushwhack

Scar Ridge, also known as Scar Ridge (West Peak), is a mountain located in Grafton County, New Hampshire. It is part of the White Mountains. It is officially trailless and several different routes are possible. Scar Ridge is flanked to the west by Loon Mountain, to the northwest by Black Mountain, and to the east by Mount Osceola.

Scar Ridge stands within the watershed of the Pemigewasset River, which drains into the Merrimack River, and into the Gulf of Maine at Newburyport, Massachusetts. The northeast side of Scar Ridge drains into the Hancock Branch, a tributary of the East Branch of the Pemigewasset River. The southwest side of Scar Ridge drains into Telford Brook, Mack Brook, and Little East Pond Brook, all of which drain into Eastman Brook, and thence into the Pemigewasset.

== See also ==
- List of mountains in New Hampshire
- White Mountain National Forest
- New England Hundred Highest
