= Loon Mountain =

Mountain in New Hampshire, United States

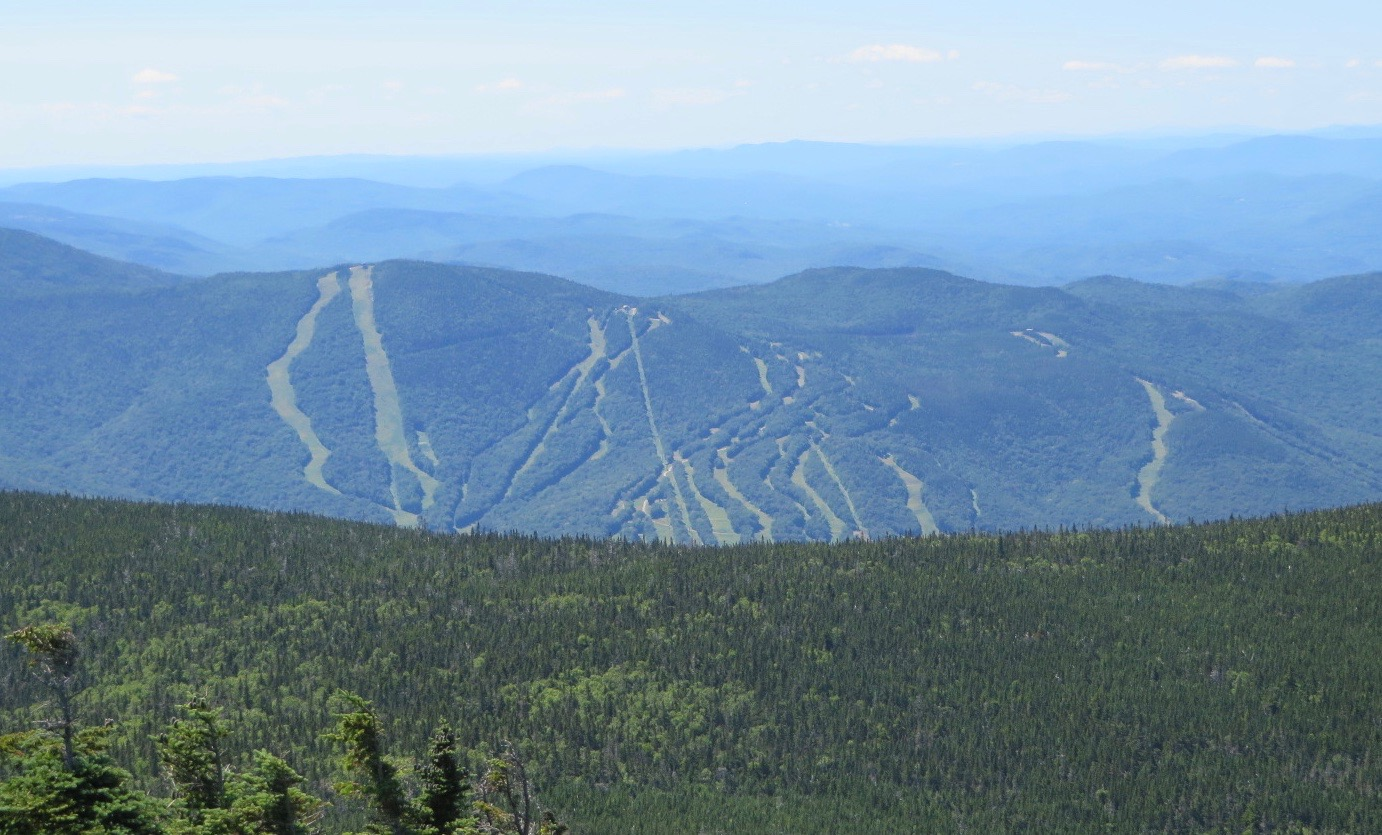
- Loon Mountain as seen from Mount Flume

Highest point
- Elevation: 3,065 ft (934 m)
- Prominence: 200 ft (61 m)
- Coordinates: 44°02′09″N 71°37′17″W

Geography
- Location within New Hampshire
- Location: Lincoln / Livermore, New Hampshire, U.S.
- Parent range: White Mountains
- Topo map(s): USGS Mount Osceola and Lincoln quadrangles

Climbing
- Easiest route: chairlift

Loon Mountain is a mountain in Lincoln and Livermore, New Hampshire, in Grafton County. It is in the White Mountain National Forest.

The 3,065-foot (934 m) mountain is known for Loon Mountain Ski Resort, which, like most New England mountain resorts, has expanded into an all-season recreation area.

== Geography ==
There are two summits to Loon Mountain: the North Peak at 3,065 feet (934 m), and the South Peak at 2,807 feet (856 m) above sea level. Between the two peaks and slightly to the north, at an elevation of 2,418 feet (737 m), is Loon Pond. "Loon Peak", with an elevation of 2,733 feet (833 m), is a northwest spur of North Peak. Each of the three peaks is the summit of one or more chairlifts belonging to the ski resort.

Loon Mountain is at the western end of Scar Ridge, which runs southeast to Mount Osceola and has numerous summits, the highest of which is 3,774 feet (1,150 m) above sea level. To the southwest of Loon Mountain is 2,424-foot (739 m) Russell Mountain.

The north side of Loon Mountain drains via Boyle Brook and Loon Pond Brook to the East Branch of the Pemigewasset River. To the west of the South Peak, Horner Brook drains directly to the Pemigewasset River. The southern slopes of Loon Mountain drain via Talford Brook to Eastman Brook and then into the Pemigewasset, which flows south to the Merrimack River and ultimately the Gulf of Maine.
