= Mount Lafayette =

Mountain in New Hampshire, United States

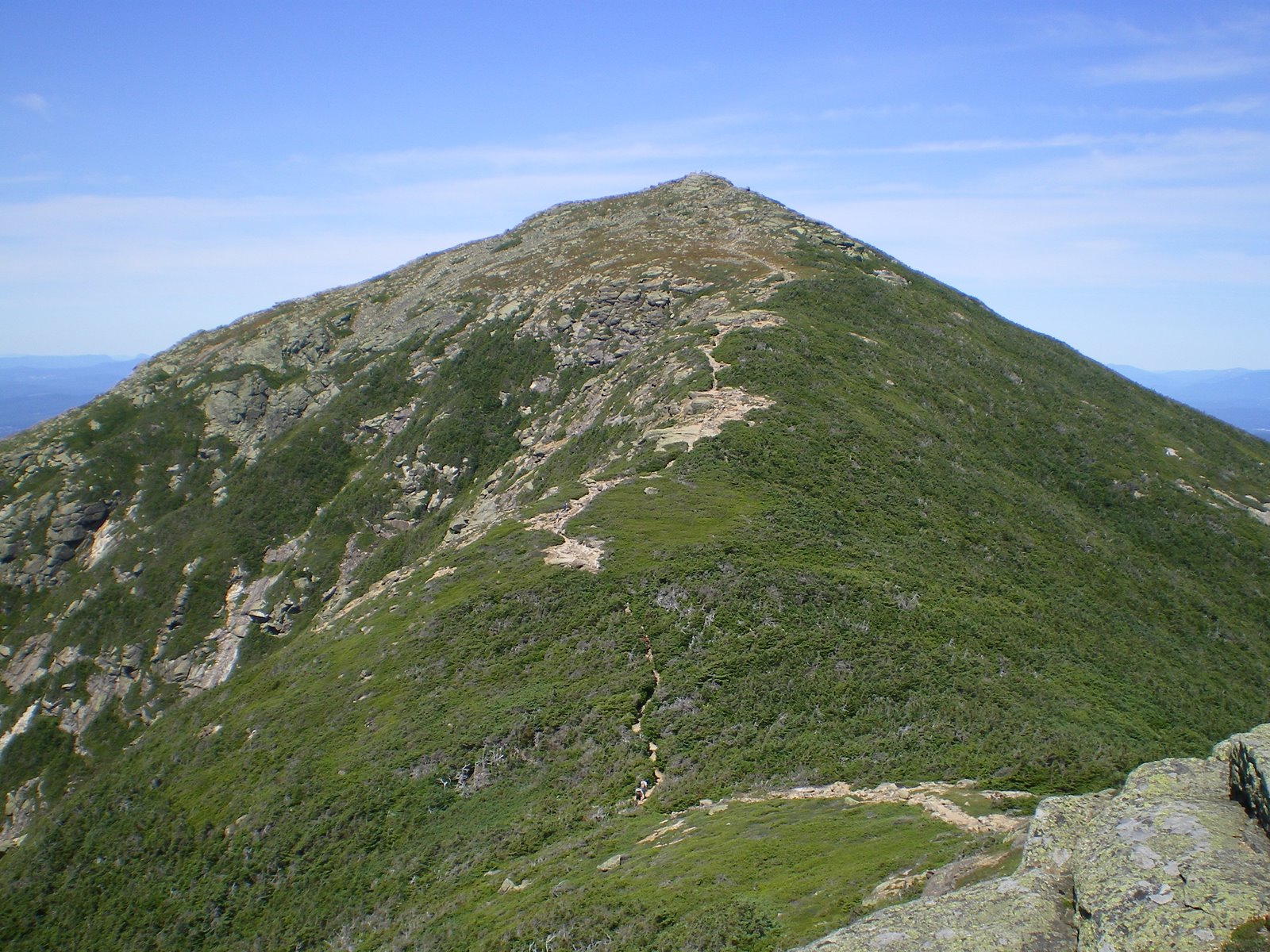
- Mount Lafayette as viewed from Franconia Ridge. Hikers are visible hiking through the krummholz in the col.

Highest point
- Elevation: 5,249 ft (1,600 m) NAVD 88
- Prominence: 3,320 ft (1,010 m)
- Parent peak: Mount Monroe
- Listing: White Mountain 4000-footers; #4 New England Fifty Finest
- Coordinates: 44°09′39″N 71°38′40″W

Geography
- Location within New Hampshire Location within the United States
- Country: United States
- State: New Hampshire
- District: Grafton County
- Subdivision: Franconia
- Parent range: Franconia Range
- Topo map: USGS Franconia

Climbing
- Easiest route: Hike from trailheads directly off Interstate 93

Mount Lafayette is a 5,249-foot (1,600 m) mountain at the northern end of the Franconia Range in the White Mountains of New Hampshire, United States. It lies in the town of Franconia in Grafton County, and appears on the New England Fifty Finest list of the most topographically prominent peaks in New England. The mountain's upper reaches are located in the alpine zone, an area where only dwarf vegetation exists due to the harsh climate.

== The mountain ==
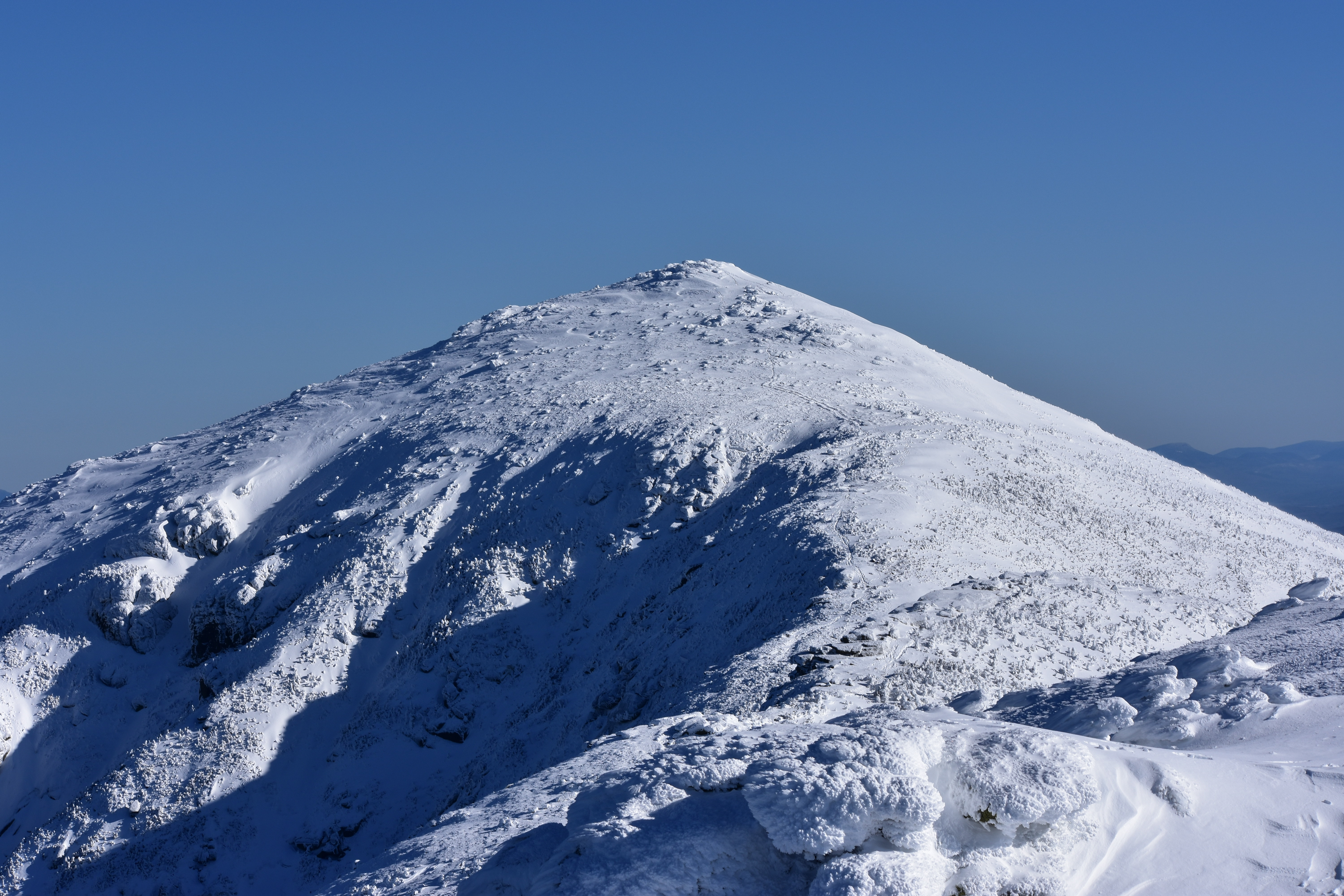
Mount Lafayette from Mount Lincoln

Mount Lafayette is the highest point in the Franconia Range, a line of peaks along the east side of Franconia Notch. It is the sixth highest peak in New Hampshire and the highest outside of the Presidential Range. It is the second most prominent peak in the state.

On the western side, its lower slopes lie inside Franconia Notch State Park. The remainder of the mountain lies within the White Mountain National Forest. The summit marks the western border of the Pemigewasset Wilderness Area within the WMNF.

=== Trails ===
A variety of trails lead up over 3,000 vertical feet (900 m) to its exposed summit. The Greenleaf Trail begins at the parking lot for the Cannon Mountain tramway and ascends to the Appalachian Mountain Club's Greenleaf Hut, then continues to the summit. The Bridle Path trail follows a western spur ridge of Lafayette from Lafayette Place Campground on Interstate 93 past Greenleaf Hut and joins the Greenleaf Trail, reaching the summit 1.1 miles (1.8 km) after the hut. The peak is at the junction of the Garfield Ridge Trail, which follows the ridge northeast to Mount Garfield, and the Franconia Ridge Trail, which leads south to Mounts Lincoln, Liberty, and Flume. Both the Garfield Ridge Trail and the Franconia Ridge Trail form part of the Appalachian Trail.

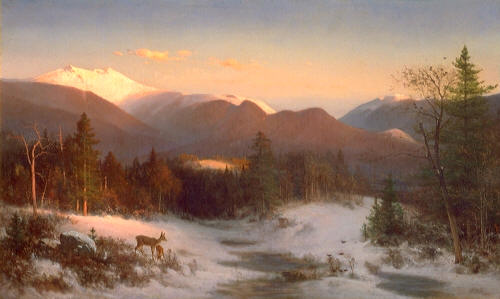
Mount Lafayette in Winter, by Thomas Hill, 1870

A very popular hike is to make a loop combining the three most notable summits of the Franconia Range. The loop starts with the Old Bridle Path to the AMC Greenleaf Hut. From there, one takes the Greenleaf Trail to the summit of Mt. Lafayette. Turning south along the Franconia Ridge Trail, one passes over Mount Lincoln and Little Haystack, then descends via the Falling Waters Trail, which connects back with the beginning of the Old Bridle Path. This loop is 8.9 miles (14.3 km) long, with a cumulative elevation gain of about 3,900 feet (1,200 m).

== History ==
The mountain is named to honor General Gilbert du Motier, Marquis de La Fayette, a French military hero who fought with and significantly aided the Continental Army during the American Revolutionary War. Loved and adopted as an aide by George Washington during the conflict, Lafayette made a triumphal tour re-visiting New Hampshire and all the other then states in 1824-1825 celebrating the 50th anniversary of the Battle of Bunker Hill.

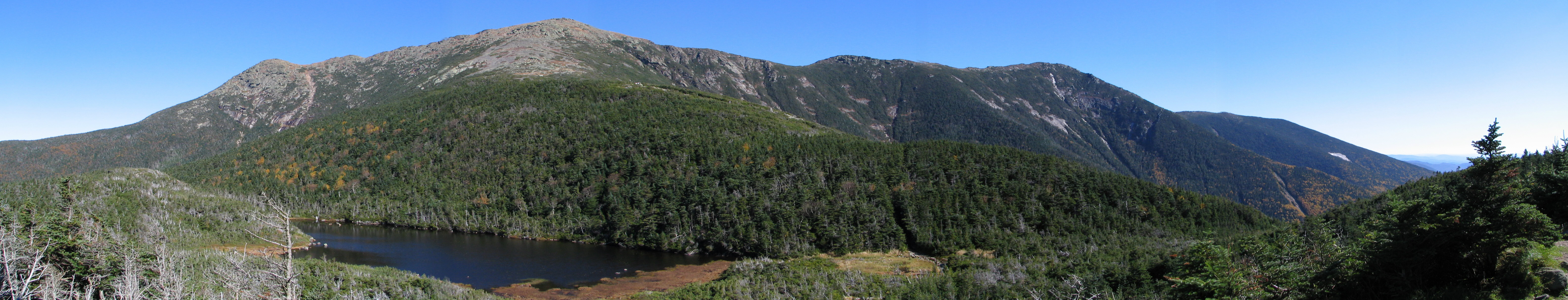
Left to right: Eagle Lake, Mount Lafayette and the Franconia Ridge as viewed from the Greenleaf Hut

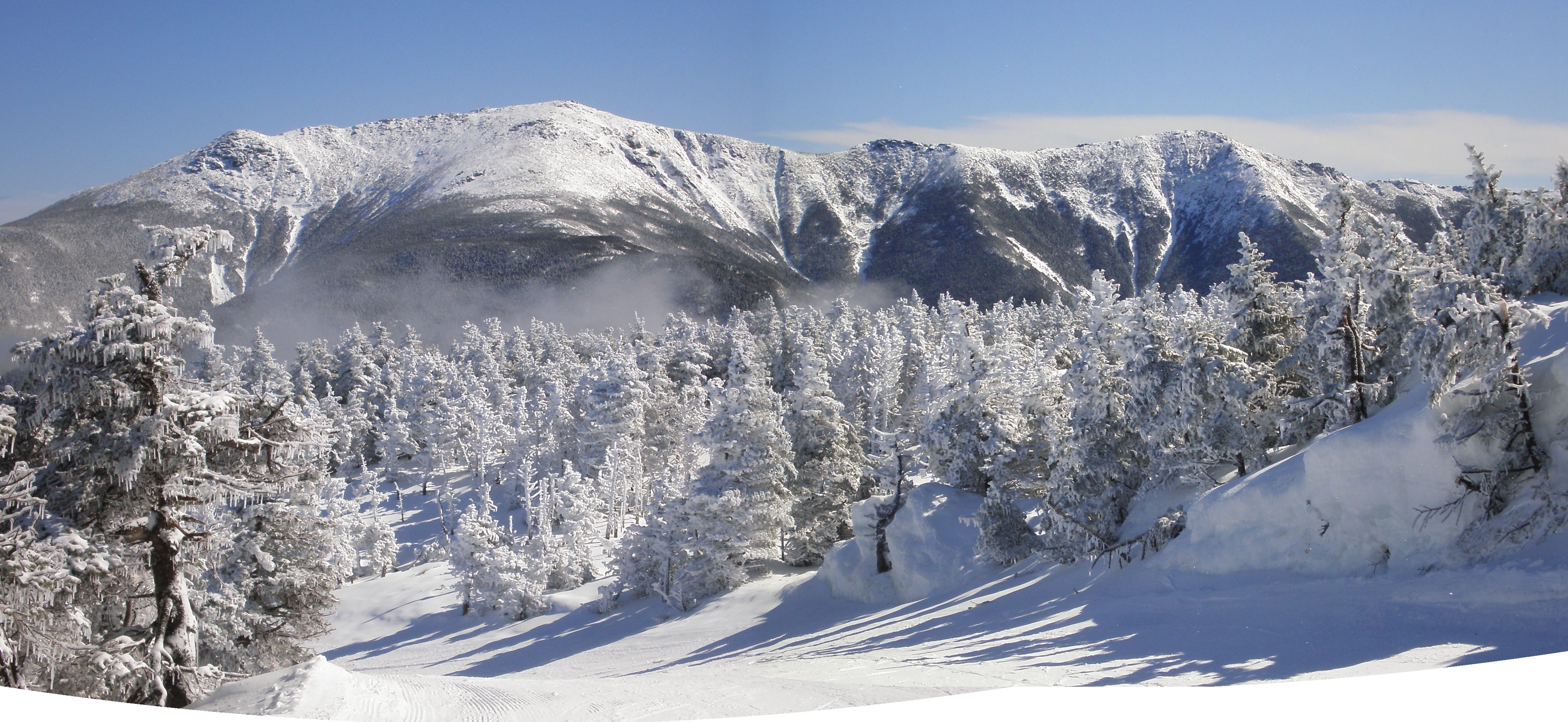
Mount Lafayette and Franconia Ridge viewed from Cannon Mountain

== Climate ==
Climate data for Mount Lafayette 44.1578 N, 71.6427 W, Elevation: 4,793 ft (1,461 m) (1991–2020 normals)
| Month | Jan | Feb | Mar | Apr | May | Jun | Jul | Aug | Sep | Oct | Nov | Dec | Year |
|---|---|---|---|---|---|---|---|---|---|---|---|---|---|
| Mean daily maximum °F (°C) | 16.8 (−8.4) | 18.5 (−7.5) | 25.0 (−3.9) | 41.0 (5.0) | 54.3 (12.4) | 62.9 (17.2) | 67.8 (19.9) | 65.7 (18.7) | 58.5 (14.7) | 46.7 (8.2) | 30.9 (−0.6) | 22.3 (−5.4) | 42.5 (5.9) |
| Daily mean °F (°C) | 9.1 (−12.7) | 10.3 (−12.1) | 17.2 (−8.2) | 31.1 (−0.5) | 44.6 (7.0) | 53.8 (12.1) | 58.8 (14.9) | 57.1 (13.9) | 50.1 (10.1) | 38.1 (3.4) | 24.6 (−4.1) | 14.9 (−9.5) | 34.1 (1.2) |
| Mean daily minimum °F (°C) | 1.4 (−17.0) | 2.2 (−16.6) | 9.3 (−12.6) | 21.1 (−6.1) | 34.8 (1.6) | 44.7 (7.1) | 49.9 (9.9) | 48.4 (9.1) | 41.7 (5.4) | 29.5 (−1.4) | 18.3 (−7.6) | 7.6 (−13.6) | 25.7 (−3.5) |
| Average precipitation inches (mm) | 5.70 (145) | 4.33 (110) | 5.60 (142) | 5.23 (133) | 6.59 (167) | 8.96 (228) | 7.38 (187) | 6.64 (169) | 5.98 (152) | 7.02 (178) | 6.31 (160) | 6.87 (174) | 76.61 (1,945) |
Source: PRISM Climate Group

== See also ==
- White Mountains Region
- List of mountains in New Hampshire
