= East Peak Mount Osceola =

Mountain in New Hampshire, USA

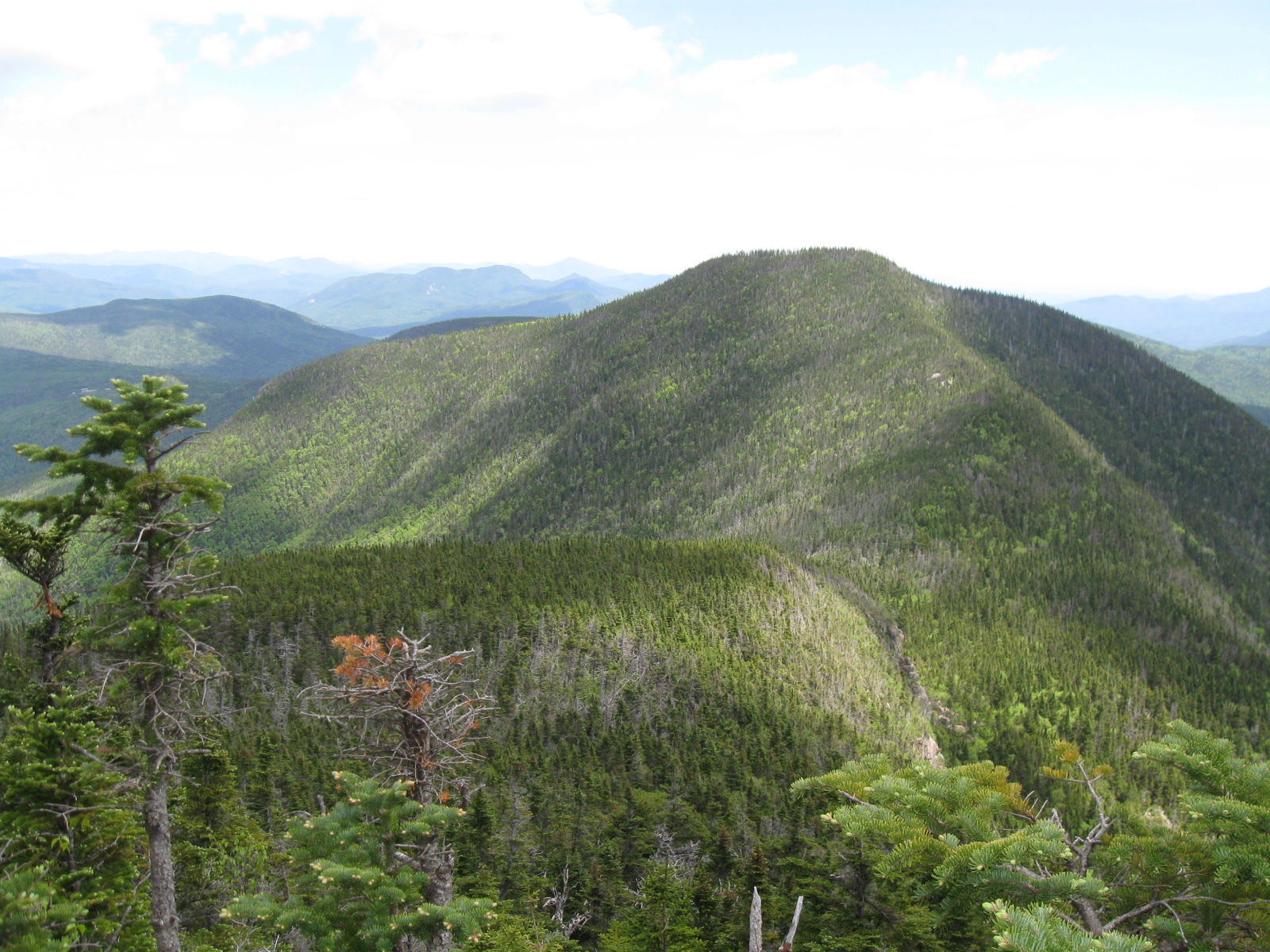
- East Osceola as seen from the summit of Mount Osceola

Highest point
- Elevation: 4,156 ft (1,267 m) NGVD 29
- Prominence: 316 ft (96 m)
- Listing: White Mountain 4000-Footers
- Coordinates: 44°00′22″N 71°31′14″W

Geography
- Location within New Hampshire
- Location: Grafton County, New Hampshire, U.S.
- Parent range: White Mountains
- Topo map: USGS Mount Osceola

The East Peak of Mount Osceola is one of the official New Hampshire 4000-footers, standing at an elevation of 4,156 feet (1,267 m). East Osceola's prominence is between 316 feet (96 m) and 356 feet (109 m), with the key saddle between it and Mount Osceola. It can be approached via the Greeley Ponds trail from the Kancamagus Highway or from the summit of neighboring Osceola. Both routes are not without difficulties; the trail from the ponds is extremely steep and prolonged, and the approach from Osceola contains a chimney, along with a less hazardous bypass by way of the saddle connecting the peaks. The summit is undistinguished and surrounded by trees.

== See also ==
- List of mountains in New Hampshire
