= Mount Lincoln (New Hampshire) =

Mountain in New Hampshire, United States

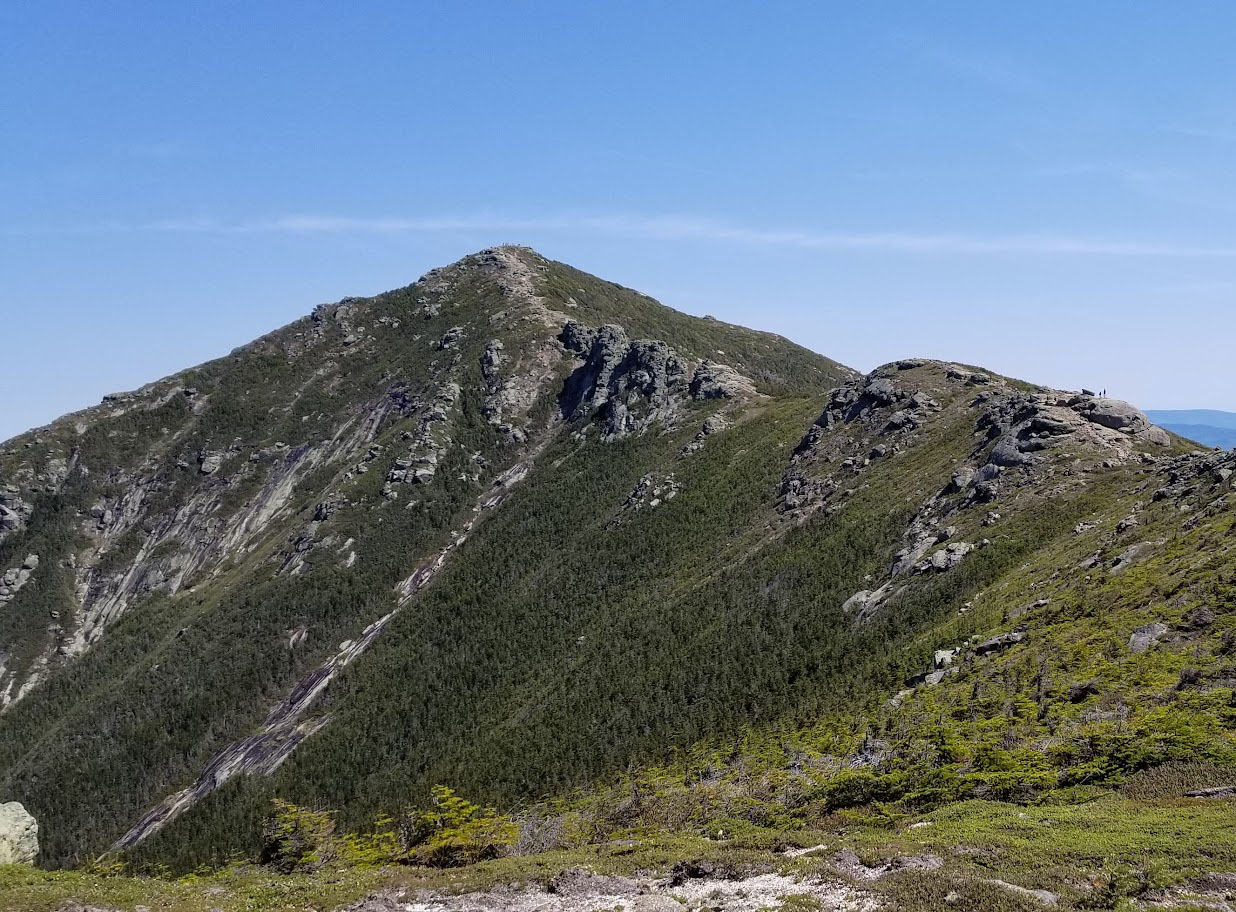
- Mount Lincoln viewed from Little Haystack Mountain on the Franconia Ridge.

Highest point
- Elevation: 5,089 ft (1,551 m)
- Prominence: 169 ft (52 m)
- Parent peak: Mount Lafayette
- Listing: White Mountain 4000-Footers
- Coordinates: 44°08′56″N 71°38′40″W

Geography
- Location within New Hampshire Location within the United States
- Location: White Mountain National Forest
- Country: United States
- State: New Hampshire
- District: Grafton County
- Subdivision: Franconia
- Parent range: Franconia Range
- Topo map: USGS Franconia

Climbing
- Easiest route: Hike

Mount Lincoln is a 5,089-foot-high (1,551 m) mountain within the Franconia Range of the White Mountains of New Hampshire. Lincoln is located between Little Haystack and Mount Lafayette. All three overlook Franconia Notch. The west side of Lincoln drains into the main stem of the Pemigewasset River. The east side drains into Lincoln Brook, thence into the Franconia Branch of the Pemigewasset.

The Appalachian Trail, a 2,170-mile (3,490 km) National Scenic Trail from Georgia to Maine, traverses Franconia Ridge, including Lincoln.

== See also ==
- Four-thousand footers
- White Mountains Region
- List of mountains in New Hampshire
