= Franconia Range =

Mountain range in New Hampshire, United States

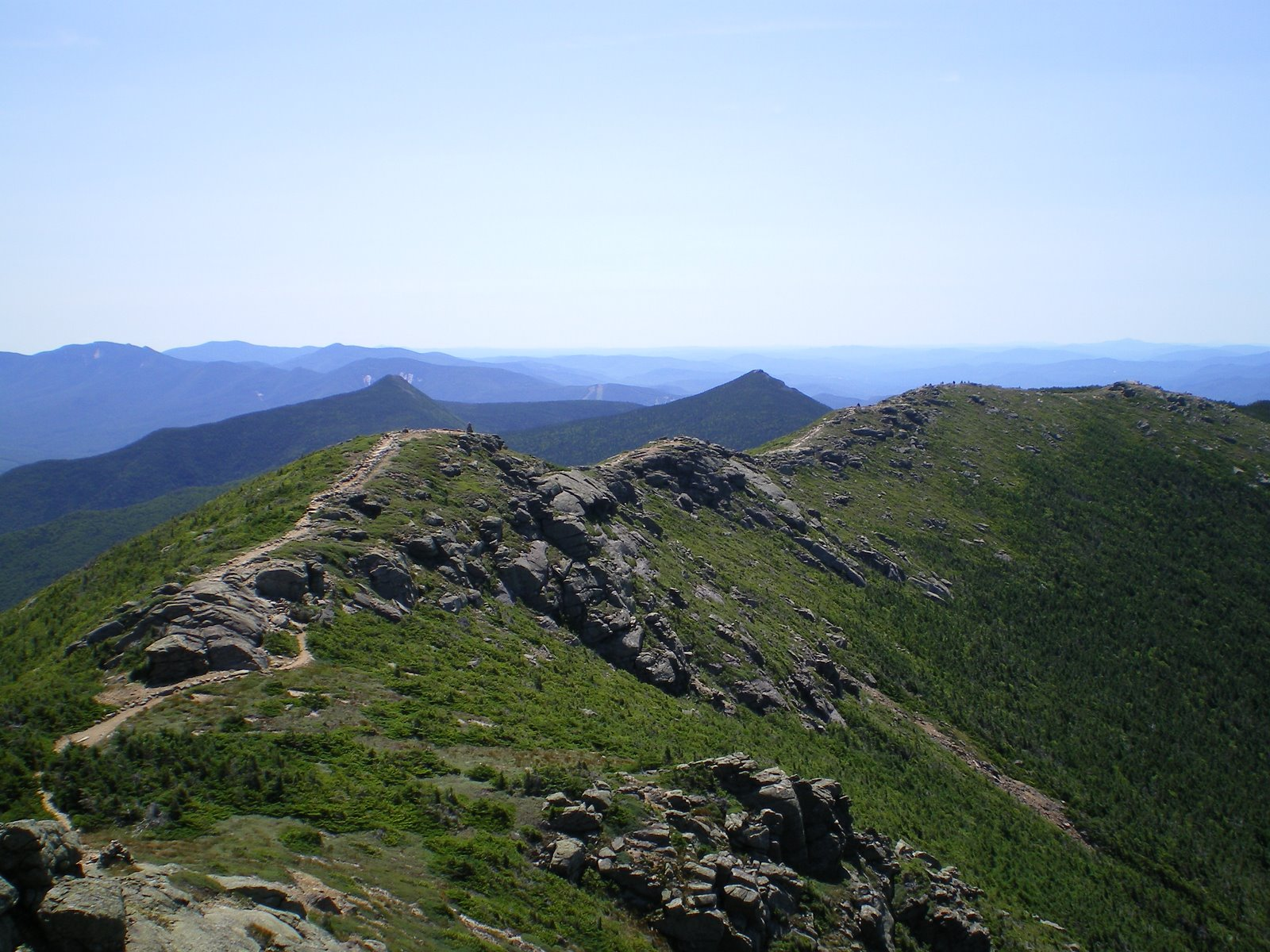
- Franconia Ridge viewed from Mount Lincoln, with the sharp peaks of Mount Flume (left) and Mount Liberty (right) visible behind the ridge.

Highest point
- Peak: Mount Lafayette
- Elevation: 5,249 ft (1,600 m)
- Coordinates: 44°9.65′N 71°38.68′W

Geography
- Country: United States
- State: New Hampshire
- Parent range: White Mountains, Appalachian Mountains
- Borders on: Twin Range and Kinsman Ridge

The Franconia Range is a mountain range located in the White Mountains of the U.S. state of New Hampshire. It is the second-highest range of peaks (after the Presidential Range) in the White Mountains.

Franconia Ridge is a prominent ridge which forms the backbone of the range, stringing together all of its major summits.

== Summits ==
From north to south, the highest summits of the range include:

- Mount Lafayette 5,249 feet (1,600 m) *
- Mount Truman 5,000 feet (1,500 m)
- Mount Lincoln 5,089 feet (1,551 m) *
- Little Haystack Mountain 4,780 feet (1,460 m)
- Mount Liberty 4,459 feet (1,359 m) *
- Mount Flume 4,328 feet (1,319 m) *

The summits marked with an asterisk (*) are included on the Appalachian Mountain Club's peak-bagging list of "Four-thousand footers" in New Hampshire.

== Features ==
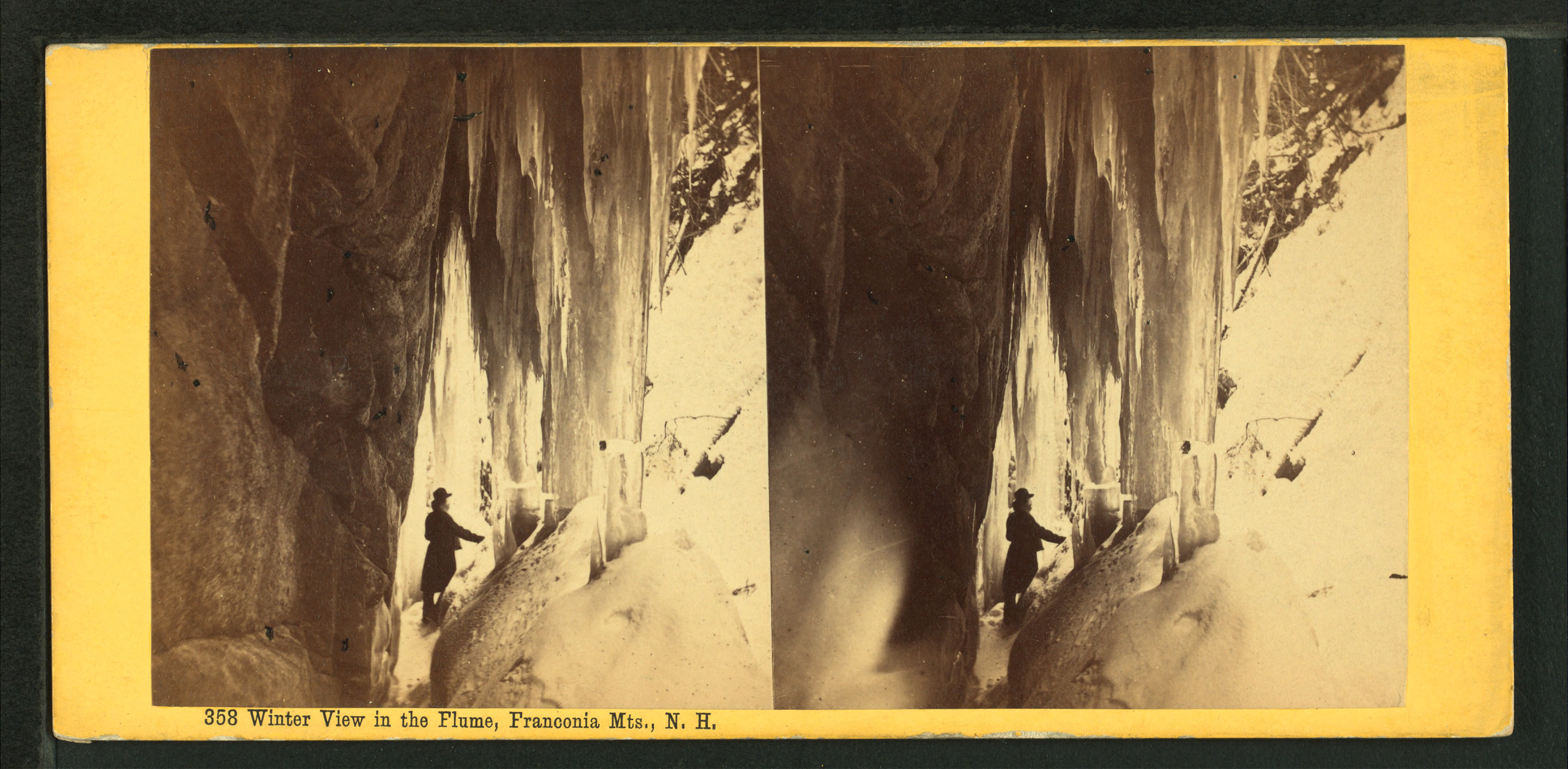
Stereoscopic image "Winter view in the Flume, Franconia Mts." by the Bierstadt Brothers

The Franconia Range hosts the third largest connected area of alpine tundra in the United States east of the Rocky Mountains, only surpassed by the Presidential Range and the Katahdin massif.

Approximately 2.5 miles (4.0 km) along the crest of the ridge is in the alpine zone. This area runs from the treeline just below the summit of Little Haystack all the way to the treeline north of Mount Lafayette, and affords constant 360-degree views of the White Mountains. To the east of the ridge lies the rugged and uninhabited Pemigewasset Wilderness.

Mount Liberty and Mount Flume are almost entirely forested; their summits have bare areas providing views of the area.

== Hiking ==
The Franconia Ridge Trail, which coincides with the Appalachian Trail from Mount Lafayette to Mount Liberty, traverses the ridge over all the aforementioned mountains.

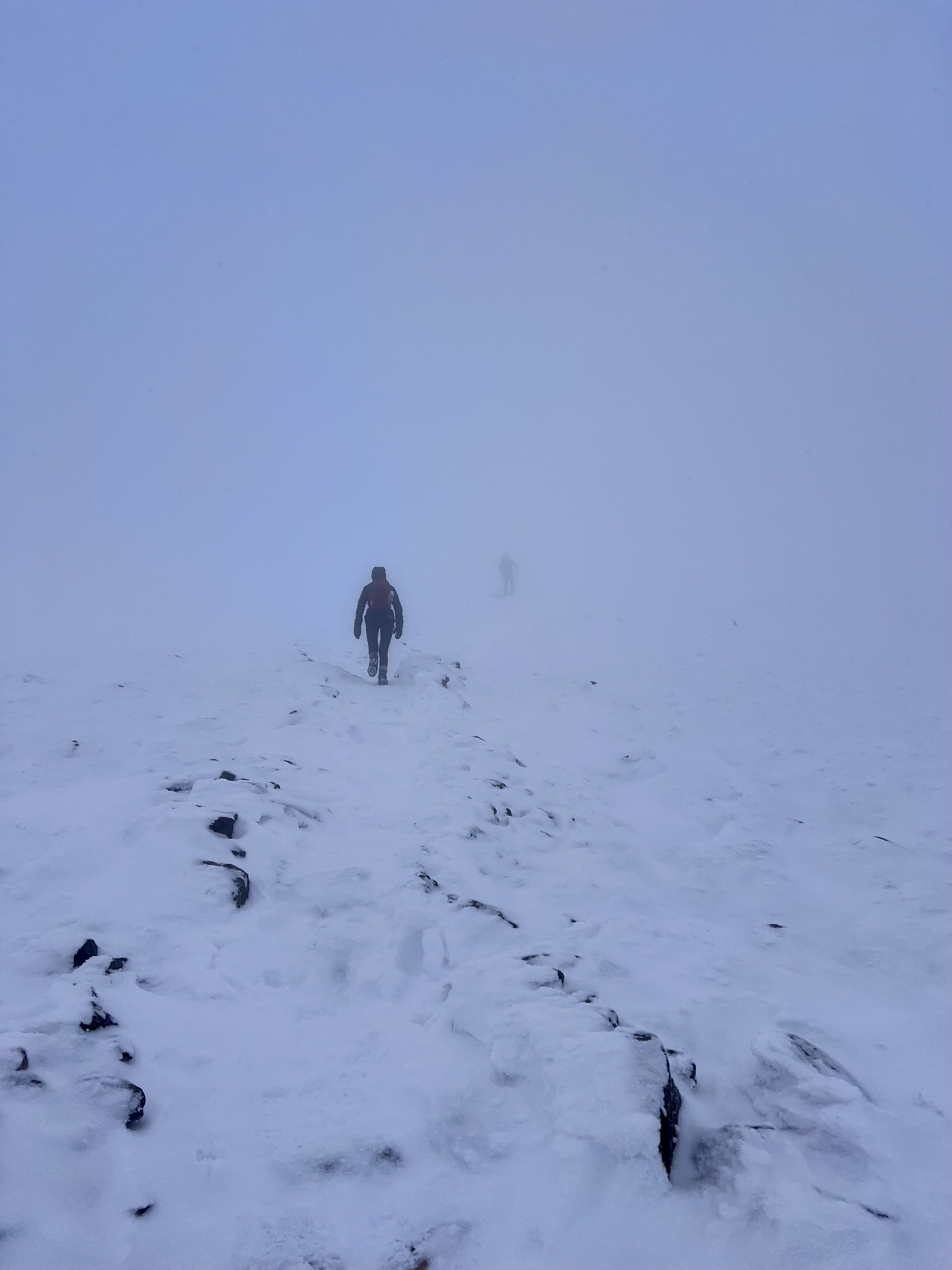
Picture of two hikers on the Franconia Ridge Trail, hiking through low visibility conditions in January 2025.

One hike on the ridge is an 8.9-mile (14.3-km) loop involving the Falling Waters Trail, the Franconia Ridge Trail, the Greenleaf Trail, and the Old Bridle Path, which includes the majority of the above-treeline portion of the ridge. Known as the Franconia Ridge Loop or Franconia Ridge Traverse, the loop is strenuous, with a cumulative gain of over 3,900 feet (1,200 m), and traverses the rocky cones of Little Haystack Mountain, Mount Lincoln, and Mount Lafayette. The northern portion of the loop also passes the Greenleaf Hut, one of the High Huts of the White Mountains.

== Dangers ==
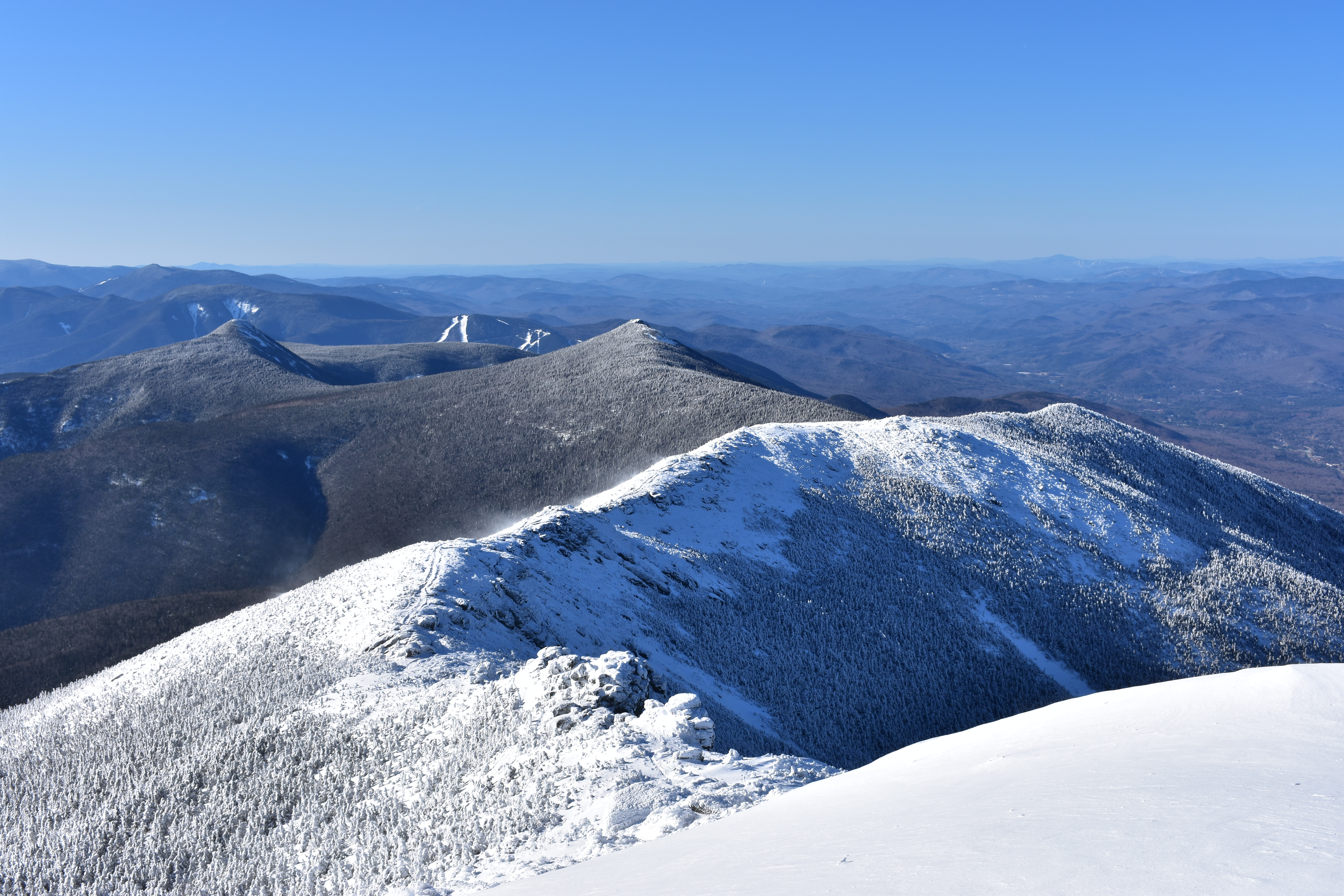
Franconia Ridge in winter

The exposed nature of the ridge and the changeable weather of the White Mountains make it a more dangerous hike than it may appear. Injuries and even fatalities from falls and exposure are not uncommon.

== See also ==
- List of subranges of the Appalachian Mountains
