= Mount Liberty (New Hampshire) =

Mountain in New Hampshire, United States

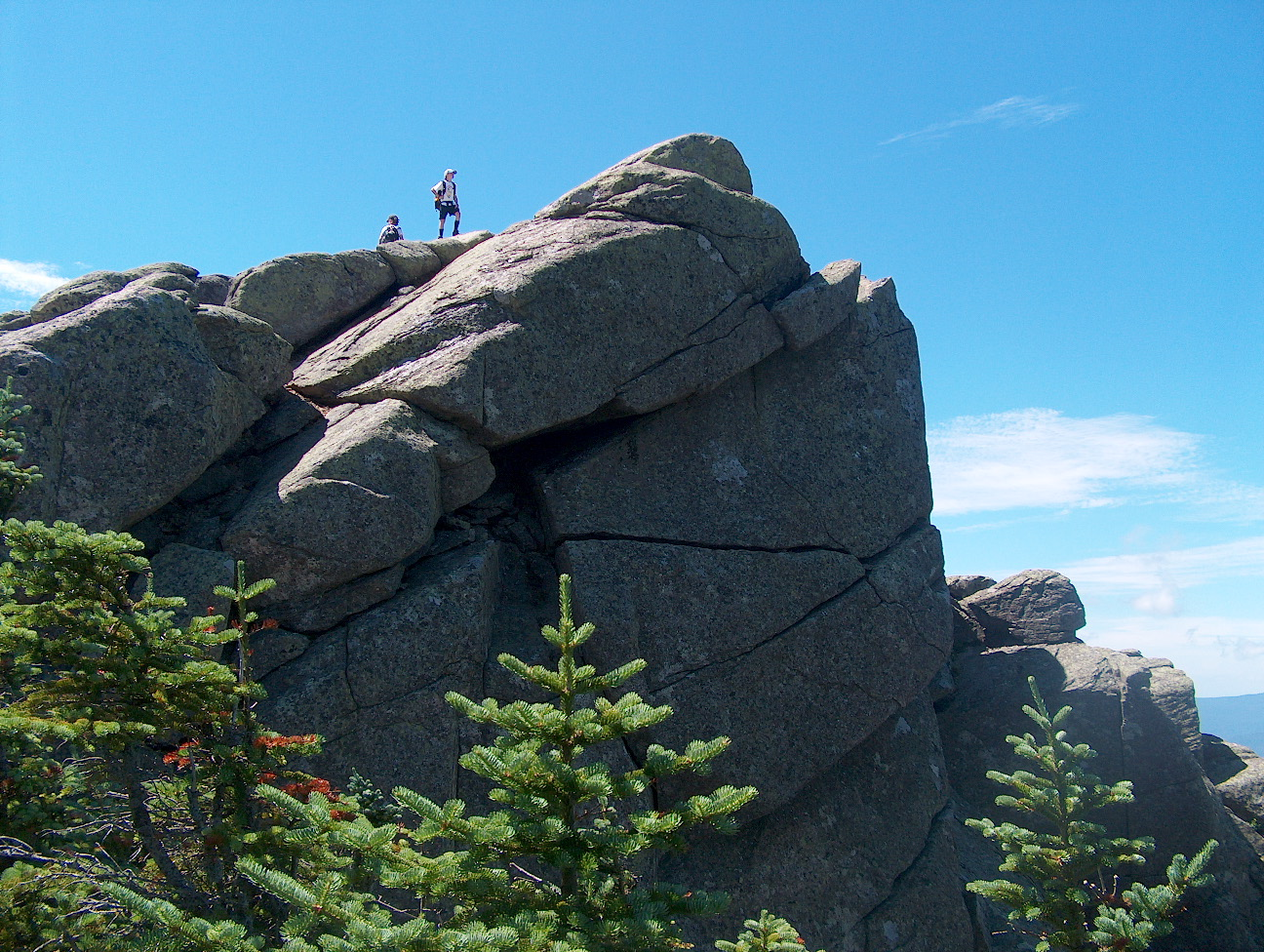
- Summit of Mount Liberty

Highest point
- Elevation: 4,459 ft (1,359 m)
- Prominence: 379 ft (116 m)
- Listing: White Mountain 4000-Footers
- Coordinates: 44°06′57″N 71°38′32″W

Geography
- Location: Grafton County, New Hampshire, U.S.
- Parent range: Franconia Range

Climbing
- Easiest route: Hike

Mount Liberty is a 4,459-foot-high (1,359 m) mountain in the White Mountains of New Hampshire. Overlooking Franconia Notch, it is part of Franconia Ridge, the second highest mountain group in the Whites after the Presidential Range. It lies south of Mount Lafayette, the highest summit along the ridge, and is listed among the Appalachian Mountain Club's "four-thousand footers".

== Gallery ==
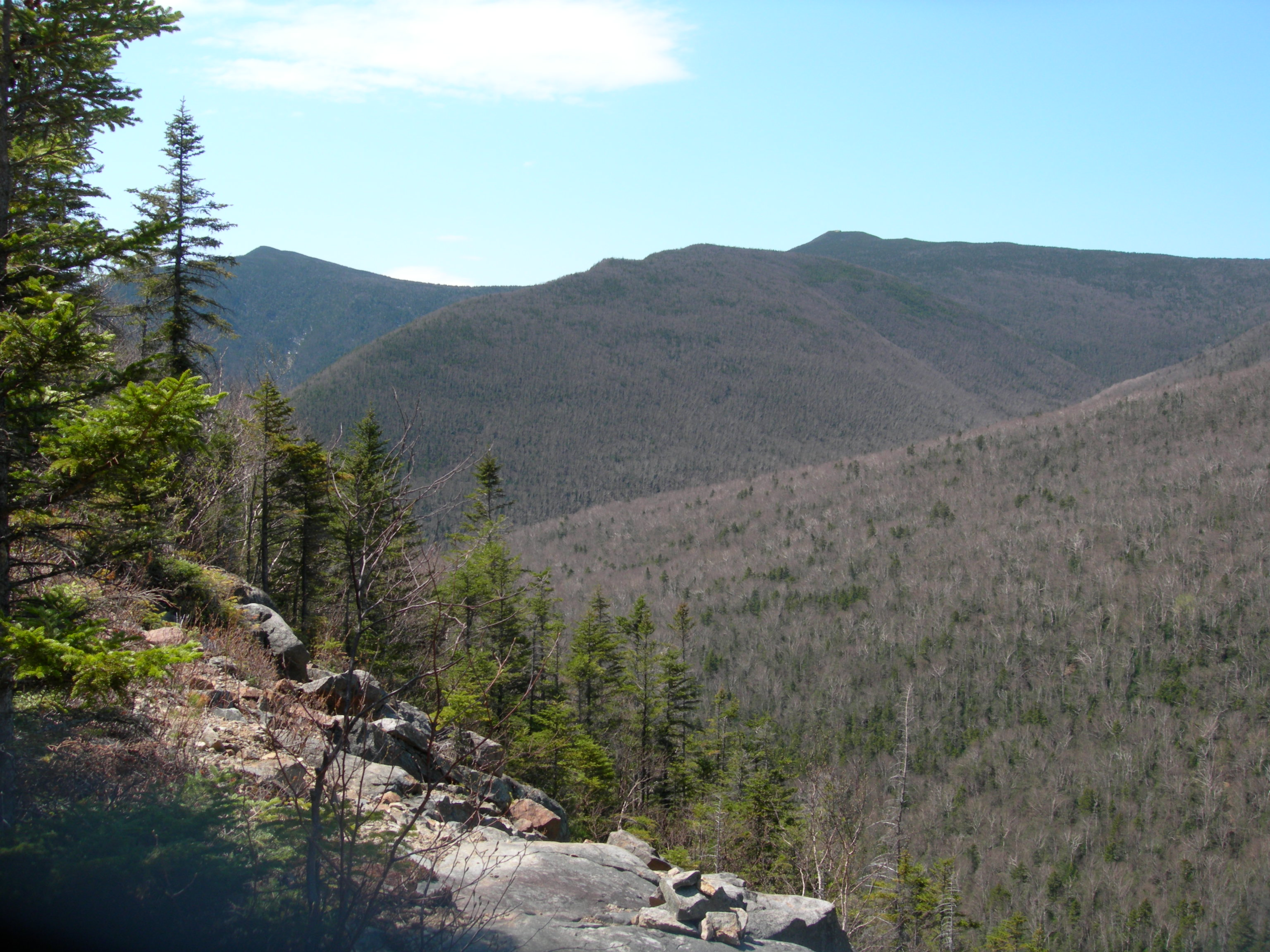
Mount Liberty seen from the slide on Owl's Head

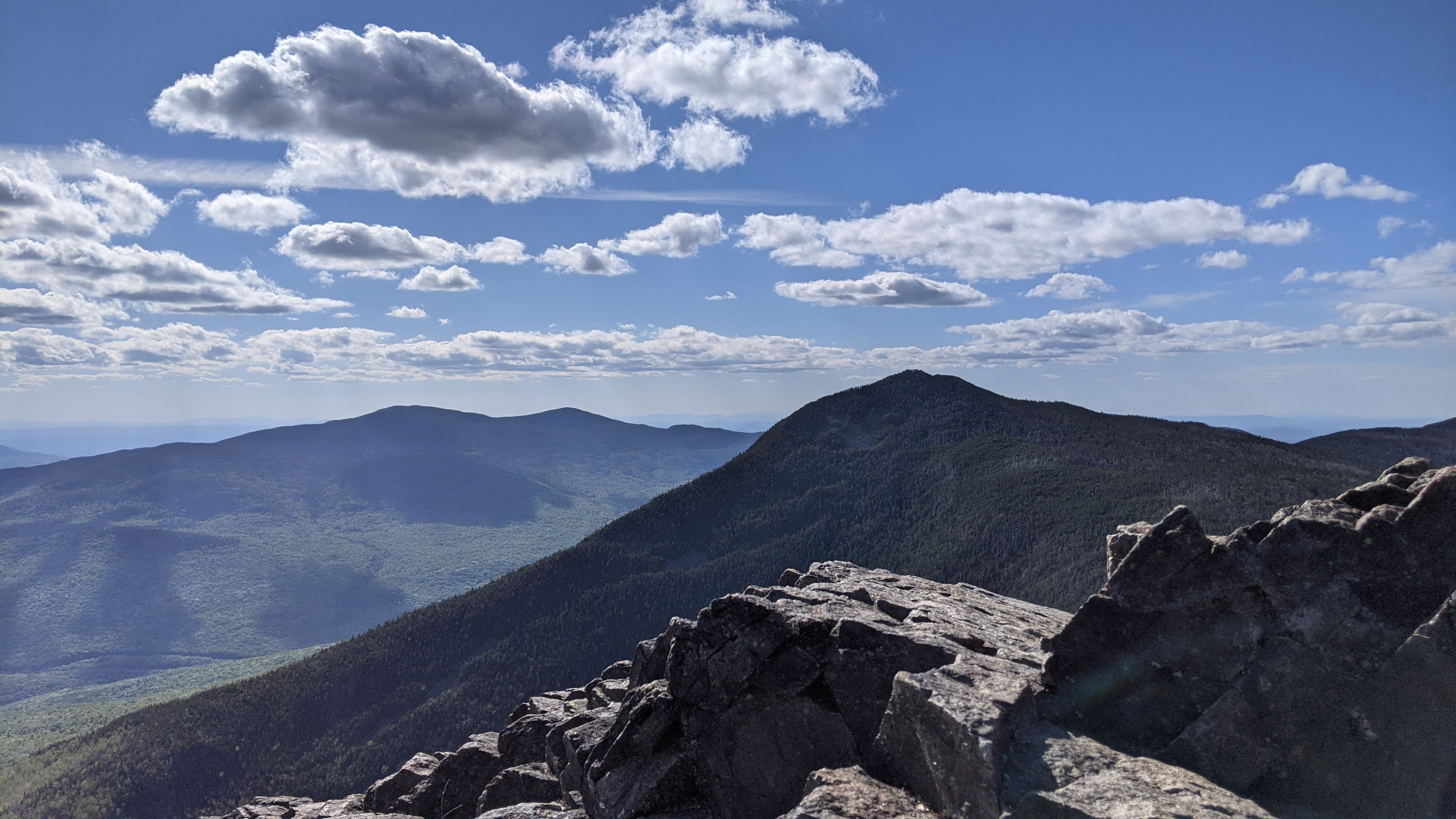
A view of Mt. Liberty from the summit of Mt. Flume

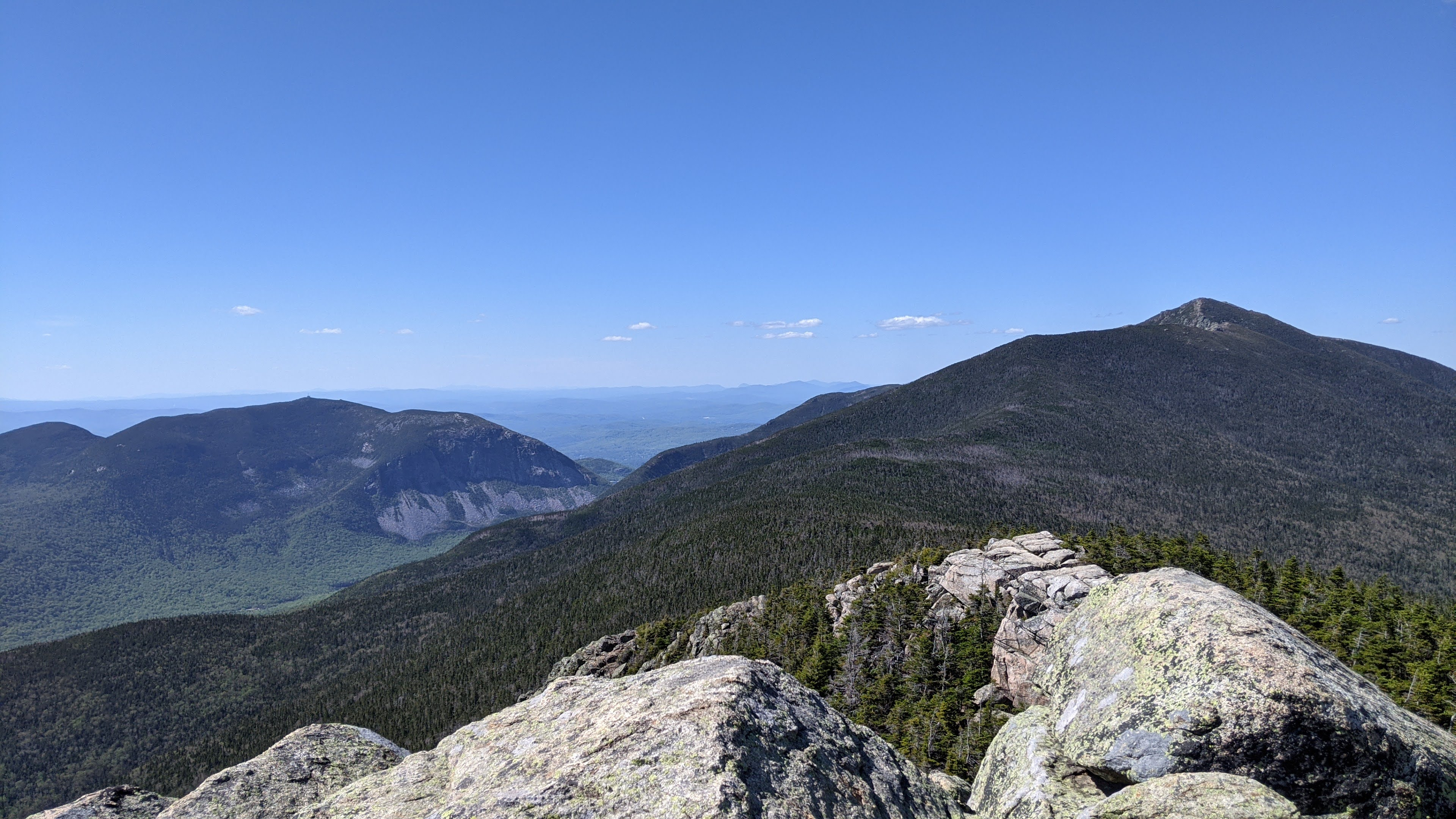
A view to the North-Northwest from the summit of Mt. Liberty

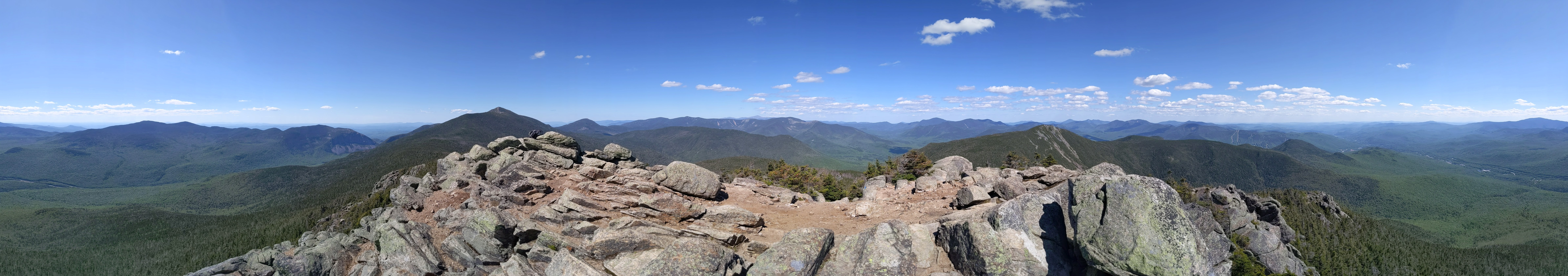
Panoramic view from the summit of Mt. Liberty

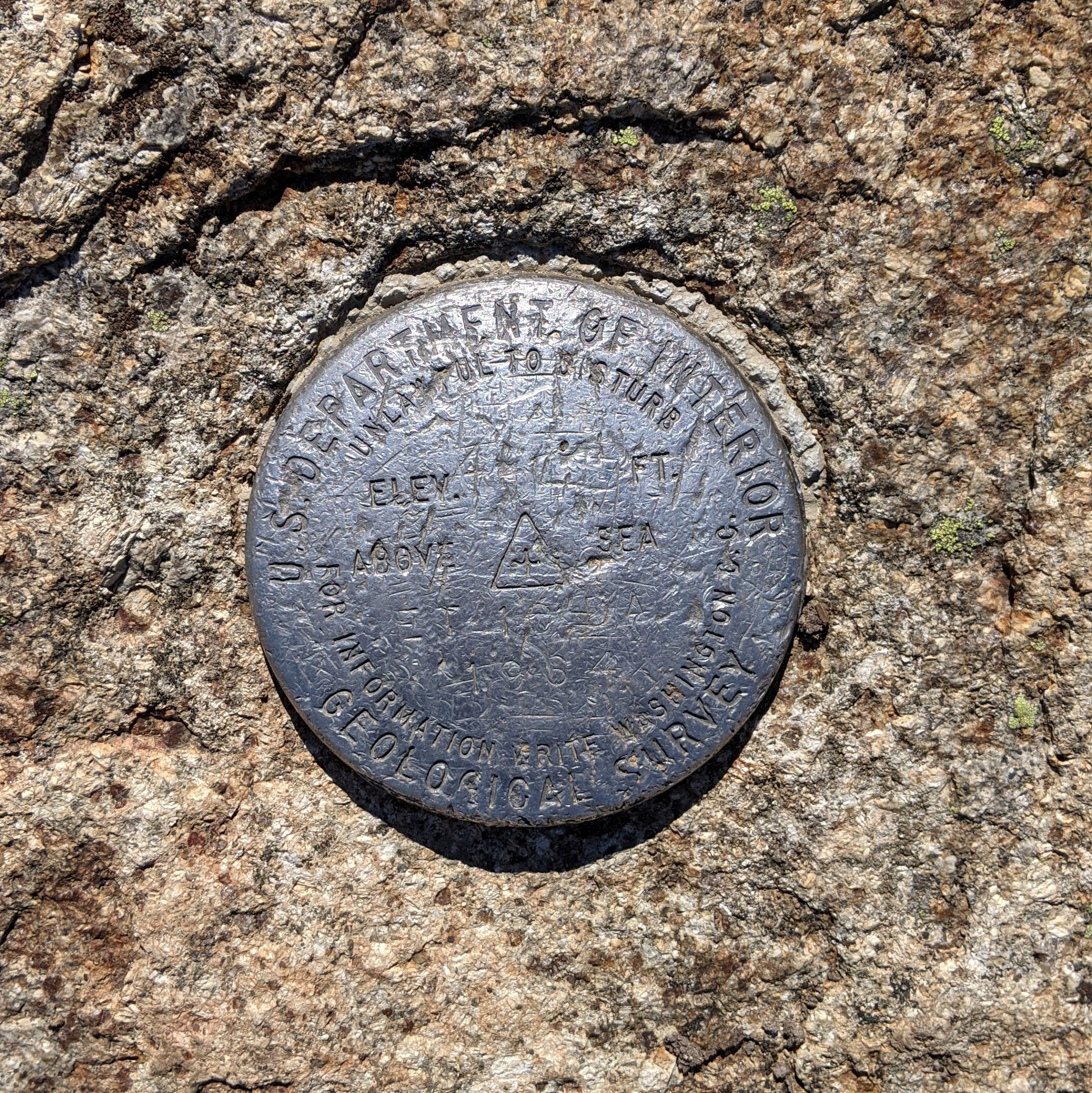
USGS survey marker at the top of Mt. Liberty

== See also ==
- Flume Gorge
