= Whale's Tale Water Park =

Water park in Lincoln, New Hampshire, US

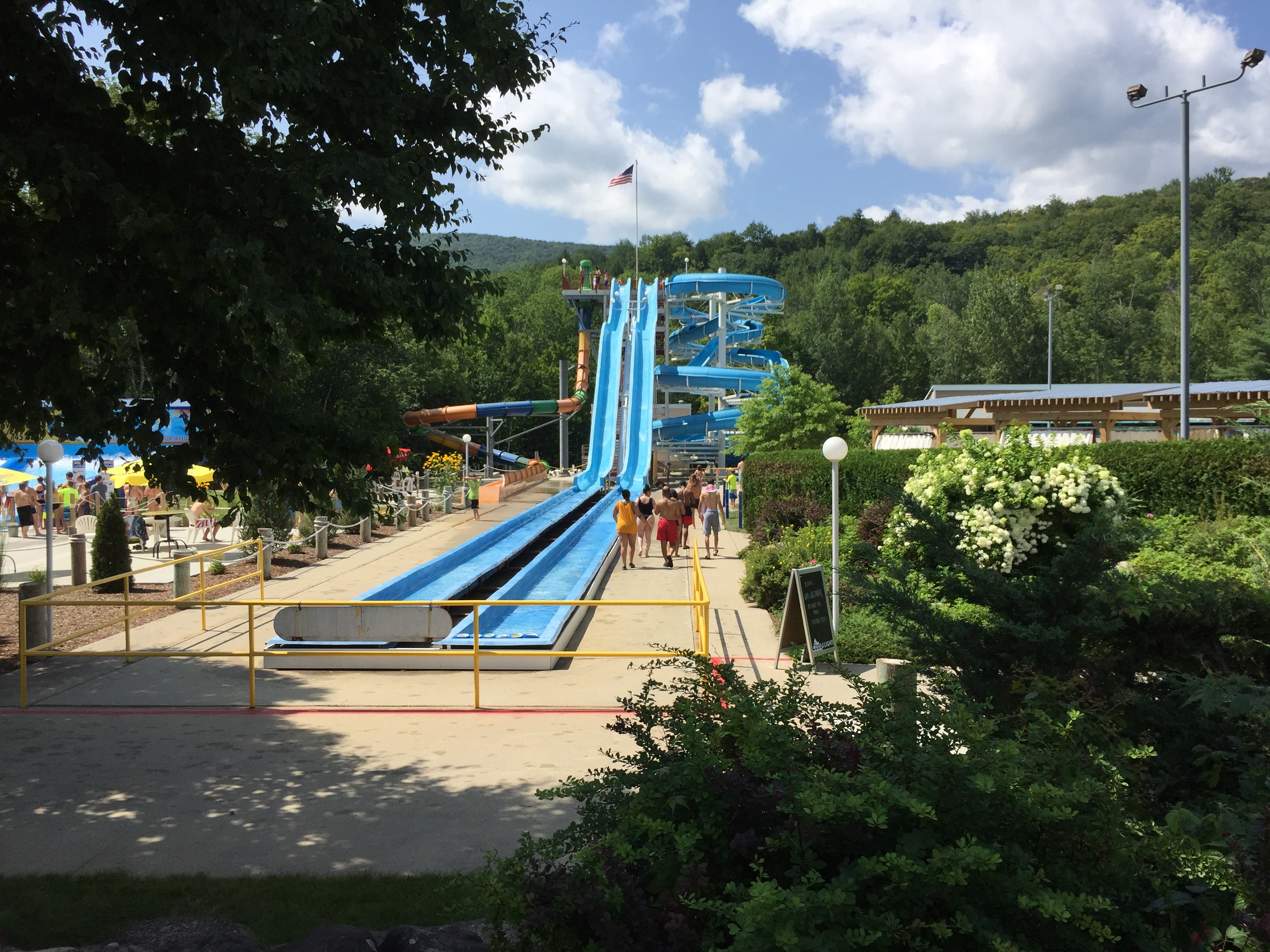
- Interactive map of Whale's Tale Water Park
- Slogan: "New England's favorite waterpark!"
- Location: Lincoln, New Hampshire, United States
- Coordinates: 44°04′18″N 71°41′12″W
- Website: www.whalestalewaterpark.net

Whale's Tale Water Park is a 17-acre (6.9 ha) water park located in Lincoln, New Hampshire, United States. It has been in operation for more than 30 years.

== Rides ==
The park has a total of 11 attractions, with recent additions of Shipwreck Island in 2010, Poseidon's Voyage in 2013, and Akua Beach in 2017. The park features rides for all ages, such as the Whale Harbor, a pool no deeper than 16 inches (0.4 m) deeming it safe for young kids and toddlers. It contains four waterslides and three water fountains as well.

There are seven featured waterslides in the park.

1. Banzai Pipeline: a large water slide where riders start in an enclosed tube until they reach the peak where they experience a backward ride down the slide
2. Eye of the Storm: A large bowl-shaped waterslide where guests first accelerate through an enclosed tube before rotating several times around the bowl. The ride ends in a 4-foot drop through a hole in the center into a deep pool, so all riders are required to be competent swimmers on this attraction. A certified lifeguard is on duty at all times at the bottom.
3. Harpoon Express: a 400-foot-long (120 m) and 7-foot-wide (2.1 m) bobsled-style tube that carries 1-3 persons per raft
4. The Beluga Boggin: a 360-foot (110 m), figure-8 shaped, water slide suitable for small children
5. The Plunge: a double slide that reaches speeds up to 40 miles per hour (64 km/h), where riders can race each other
6. Downpour: a 430-foot-long (130 m) winding slide that starts 50 feet (15 m) in the air. It is also connected to the Plunge.
7. The Poseidon's Voyage: a long water slide where riders start in a SkyBox (a steep vertical launch capsule), which spirals down into a 360 degree loop towards the end

Side attractions include Shipwreck Island, a maze of elevated platforms featuring miniature water slides and various water sprays. Willie's Wild Waves is a 60-foot (18m) wide wave pool. The shallow end features a concrete beach area with chairs, while the deep end reaches a depth of 6 feet. Waves start and stop every 10 minutes, and tubes are available to use. Jonah's Escape is a large lazy river that moves swimmers around under gentle waterfalls. In the center of the lazy river is a side attraction called the Castaway Cove. It features an 85-foot (26 m) heated pool designed in the shape of a whale, set at 88 °F (31 °C) with underwater seating. It is surrounded by three large hot tubs, all maintained at 104 °F (40 °C), with available table services located around the pool.

== Food ==
The park includes two main food locations and one main beverage location, in addition to an outdoor bar and restaurant and concession stands.

Coolers are allowed into the park with food and drinks, but glass or alcohol are not permitted. Coolers will be checked at the front gates before entering into the park. All beverages are required to be factory sealed.

== Other attractions ==
Cabanas are made available to visitors on a first-come first-served basis, which include a 10-foot (3.0 m) shade with retractable screens, a lunch table of four chairs, two lounge chairs and a cocktail table. They are located around the beach and Castaway Cove.

All around the park are large green areas which are available to use by the visitors. Equipment like chairs and blankets can be brought and set up to use for the day.

Breakers Surf Shop is the featured 2,500-square-foot (230 m^{2}) gift shop at the park, which carries all beach necessities, toys, sunglasses, souvenirs, and more. Lifejackets can be borrowed free of charge at a booth next to the park entrance.

== Safety and weather ==
Safety at the Whale's Tale water park are certified by the American Red Cross, ServSafe and Certified Pool Operators. It is important that all park rules are followed by the visitors as they will be held responsible for any safety issues.

In the event of thunderstorms within a 10-mile radius, the park will close immediately, and rain checks for the current operating season will be issued to for the time missed.
