= Mount Osceola =

Mountain in the American state of New Hampshire

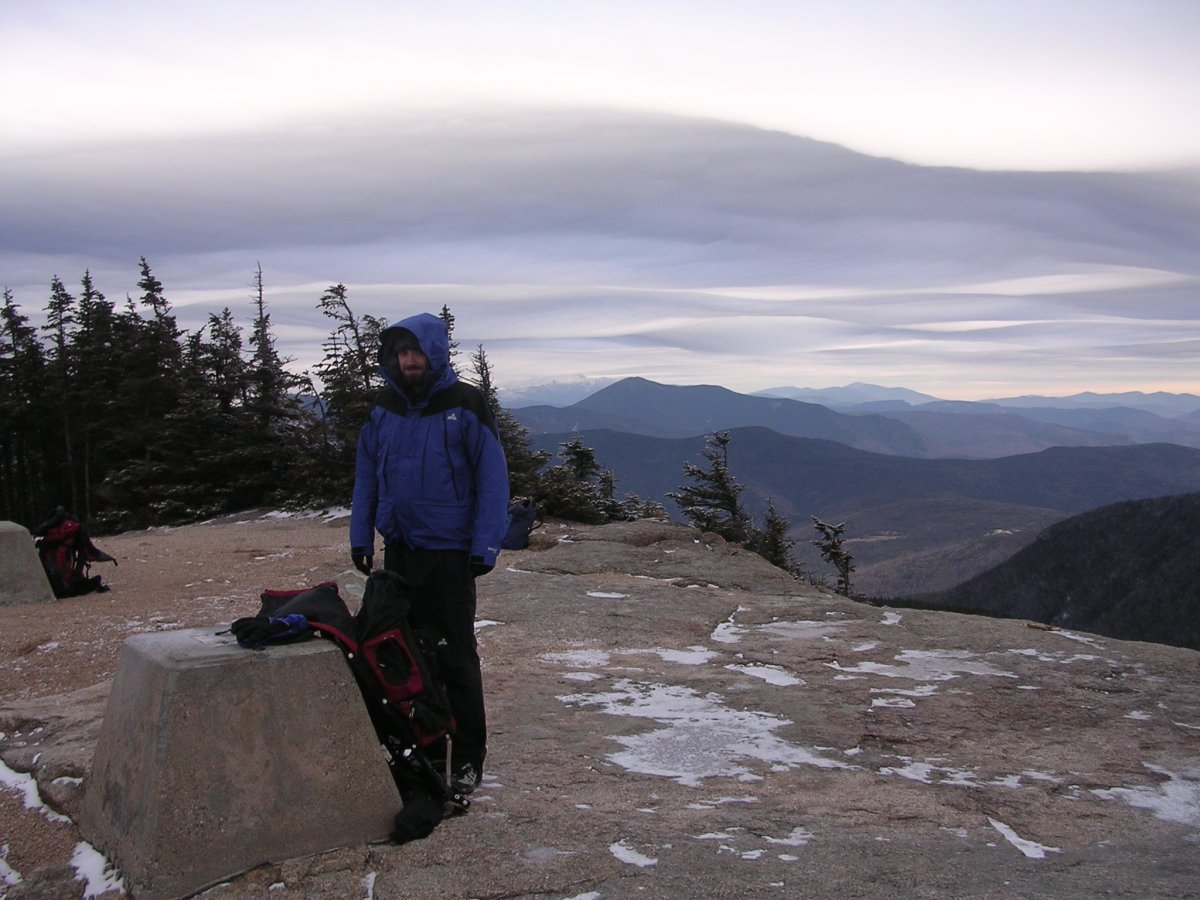
- Summit of Mount Osceola in late November 2004

Highest point
- Elevation: 4,340 ft (1,320 m)
- Prominence: 2,034 ft (620 m)
- Listing: White Mountain 4000-Footers, New England Fifty Finest
- Coordinates: 44°0′5.81″N 71°32′8.21″W

Geography
- Location: Grafton County, New Hampshire, U.S.
- Parent range: White Mountains
- Topo map: USGS

Climbing
- Easiest route: Mt. Osceola Trail

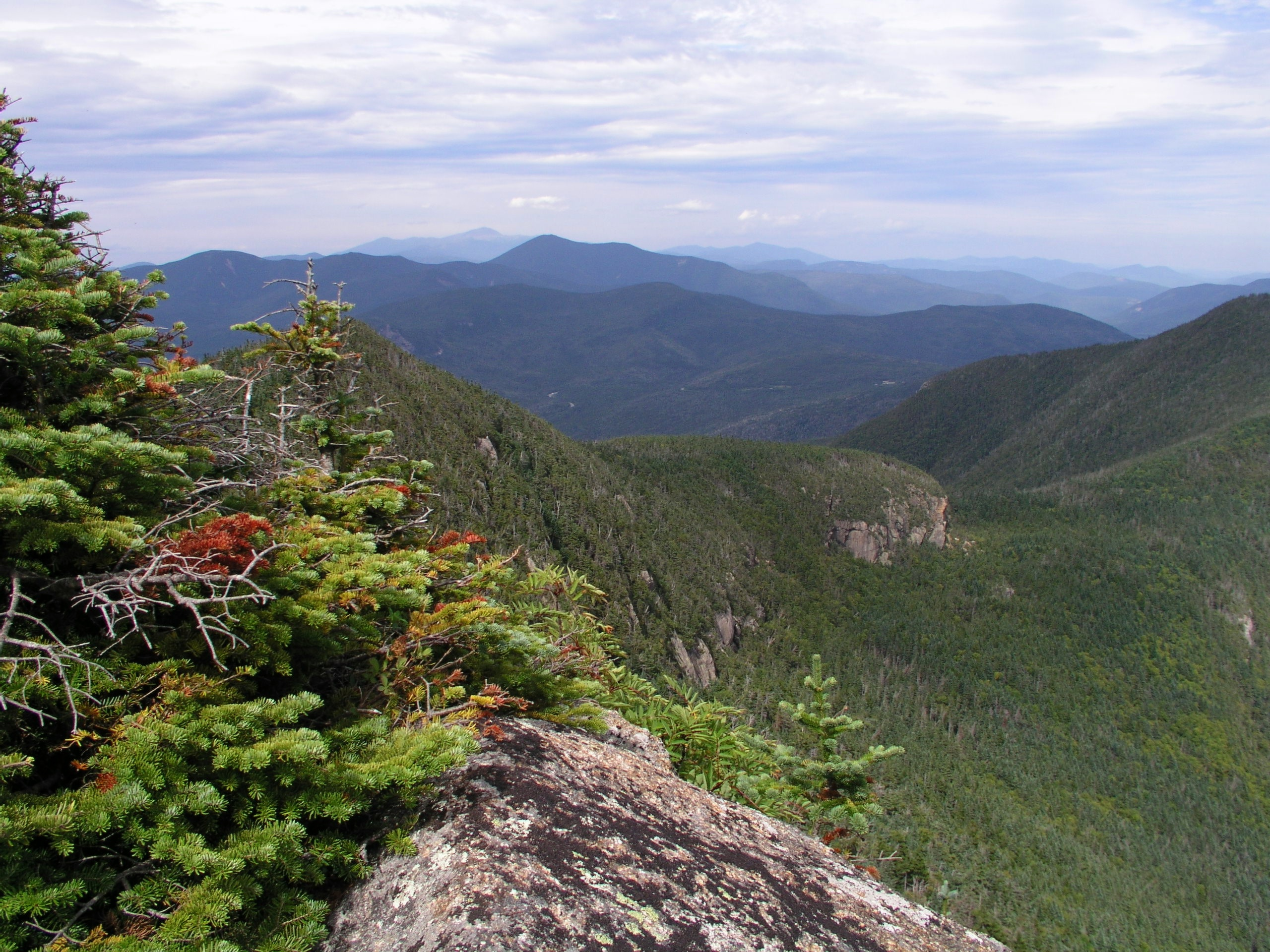
View from the summit, August 2010

Mount Osceola is a 4,340-foot (1,320 m) peak within the White Mountains of New Hampshire. Located in the White Mountain National Forest, the mountain is named for Osceola, the early-19th century Seminole leader. It is the highest peak in the Waterville Valley region.

Osceola can be ascended from the Greeley Pond Trail to the northeast of the mountain, which requires crossing the East Peak of Osceola first, or from the Tripoli Road to the south. There was a fire lookout tower at the top of the mountain, which significantly expanded the view from the peak, but it was taken down in the late 1970s. Views from the summit cover a large portion of the White Mountains, extending from Mount Washington in the northeast to the town of Waterville Valley in the south.

== Climate ==
Climate data for Mount Osceola 44.0016 N, 71.5399 W, Elevation: 3,888 ft (1,185 m) (1991–2020 normals)
Month	Jan	Feb	Mar	Apr	May	Jun	Jul	Aug	Sep	Oct	Nov	Dec	Year
Mean daily maximum °F (°C)	19.5 (−6.9)	21.7 (−5.7)	28.9 (−1.7)	43.7 (6.5)	56.2 (13.4)	64.6 (18.1)	68.9 (20.5)	67.7 (19.8)	61.0 (16.1)	48.6 (9.2)	35.0 (1.7)	25.0 (−3.9)	45.1 (7.3)
Daily mean °F (°C)	11.6 (−11.3)	13.2 (−10.4)	20.1 (−6.6)	33.4 (0.8)	46.0 (7.8)	54.8 (12.7)	59.5 (15.3)	58.4 (14.7)	52.0 (11.1)	40.3 (4.6)	28.6 (−1.9)	18.6 (−7.4)	36.4 (2.4)
Mean daily minimum °F (°C)	3.8 (−15.7)	4.7 (−15.2)	11.2 (−11.6)	23.2 (−4.9)	35.7 (2.1)	45.0 (7.2)	50.0 (10.0)	49.1 (9.5)	43.0 (6.1)	31.9 (−0.1)	22.2 (−5.4)	12.1 (−11.1)	27.7 (−2.4)
Average precipitation inches (mm)	4.44 (113)	4.28 (109)	5.21 (132)	6.04 (153)	5.64 (143)	6.66 (169)	7.88 (200)	5.93 (151)	5.27 (134)	7.57 (192)	5.99 (152)	6.50 (165)	71.41 (1,813)
Source: PRISM Climate Group

== See also ==
- Four-thousand footers
- White Mountains Region
- List of mountains of New Hampshire
