= Flume Gorge =

Natural gorge in New Hampshire, United States

- The Flume
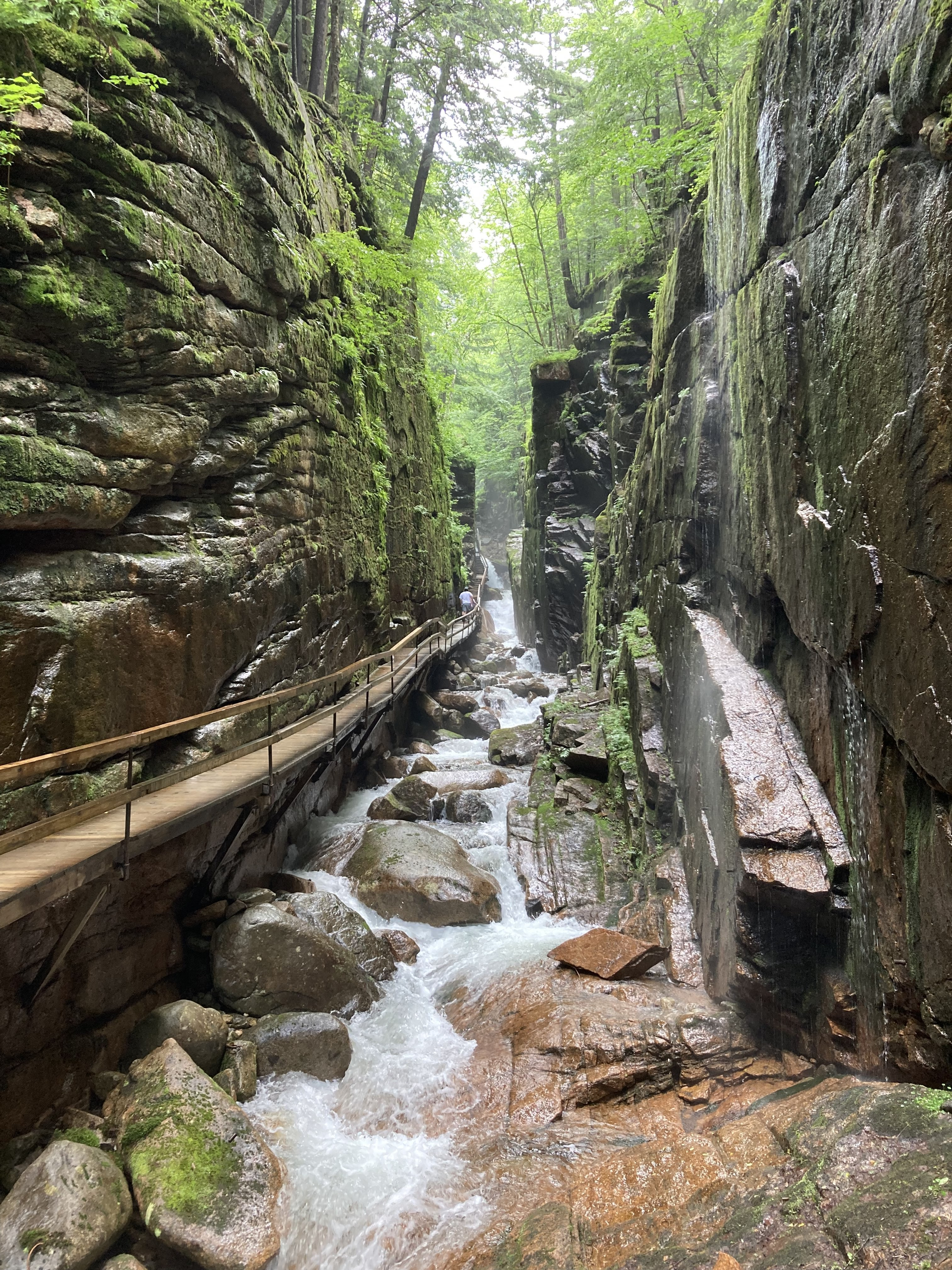
- Flume Gorge in July 2023

- Location within New Hampshire
- Length: 800 feet (240 m) E-W
- Width: 12–20 feet (3.7–6.1 m)
- Depth: 70–90 ft (21–27 m)

Geology
- Type: Gorge

Geography
- Location: New Hampshire
- Country: United States
- State: New Hampshire
- District: Grafton County
- Coordinates: 44°5′59″N 71°40′12″W
- Traversed by: Flume Gorge Trail
- River: Flume Brook
- Interactive map of Flume Gorge

The Flume Gorge (locally, just The Flume) is a natural gorge in Franconia Notch State Park, New Hampshire, United States. The Flume is now a paid attraction that allows visitors to walk through it from May 10 to October 20.

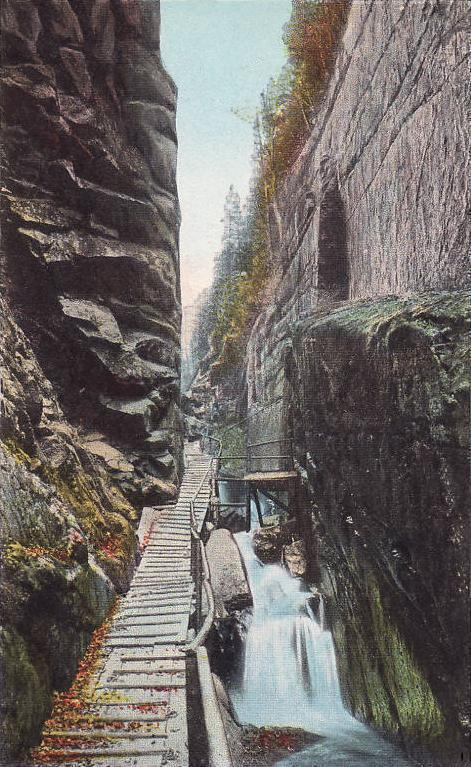
A 1915 postcard of the Flume

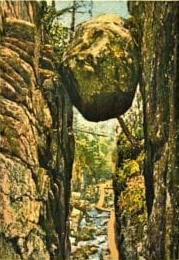
The Flume's hanging boulder before its 1883 fall (colorized)

== See also ==
- Franconia Notch
- Mount Flume
