= Mount Flume =

Mountain in New Hampshire, United States

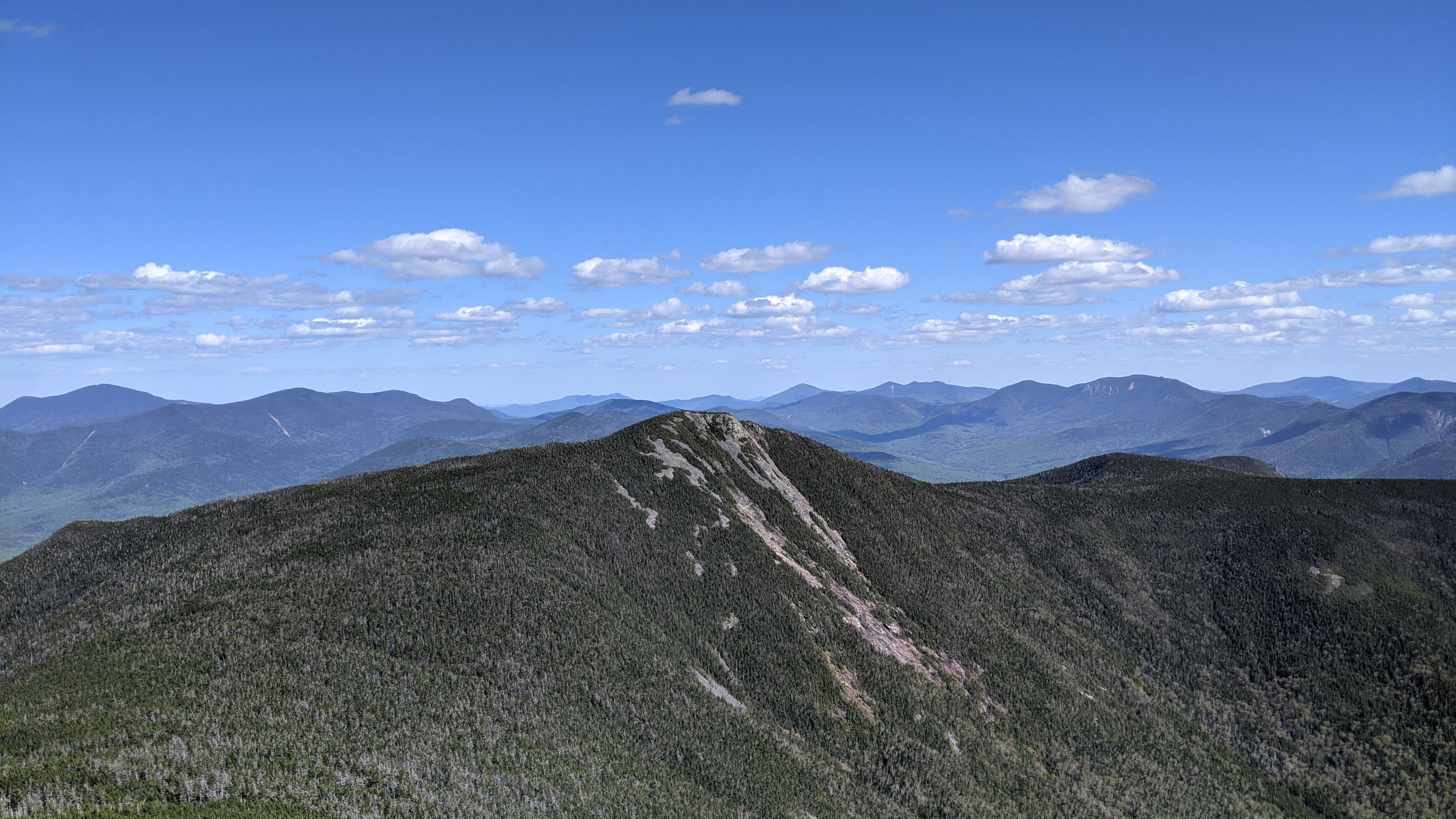
- View of Mount Flume from Mount Liberty

Highest point
- Elevation: 4,328 ft (1,319 m) NGVD 29
- Prominence: 408 ft (124 m)
- Listing: White Mountain 4000-Footers
- Coordinates: 44°06′32″N 71°37′40″W

Geography
- Location within New Hampshire Location within the United States
- Location: Grafton County, New Hampshire, U.S.
- Parent range: Franconia Range
- Topo map: USGS Lincoln

Climbing
- Easiest route: Hike

Mount Flume is a 4,328-foot (1,319 m) mountain at the southern end of the Franconia Range in the White Mountains of New Hampshire, United States. Mount Flume is the lowest in elevation of the peaks in the Franconia Range that are accessible by official hiking trails.

The summit marks the western border of the Pemigewasset Wilderness within the White Mountain National Forest. From the summit, there are outstanding views of Franconia Notch and the Kinsman Range to the west and the Franconia Range to the north, with limited views of the Pemigewasset Wilderness and the Twin Range to the east.

== Hiking ==
The peak can be reached from the southeast by starting on the Lincoln Woods Trail and turning onto the Osseo Trail, for a total of 5.6 miles (9.0 km) with a 3,150-foot (960 m) elevation gain. From the west the peak can be climbed via the Liberty Spring Trail, followed by the Flume Slide Trail, for a total of 4.1 miles (6.6 km) with a 2,950-foot (899 m) elevation gain. From the north the summit is reached by the Franconia Ridge Trail coming from the summit of Mount Liberty. The Flume Slide Trail is a notably steep and slippery climb, and its use is discouraged in wet weather or snow. It is not recommended as a descending trail.

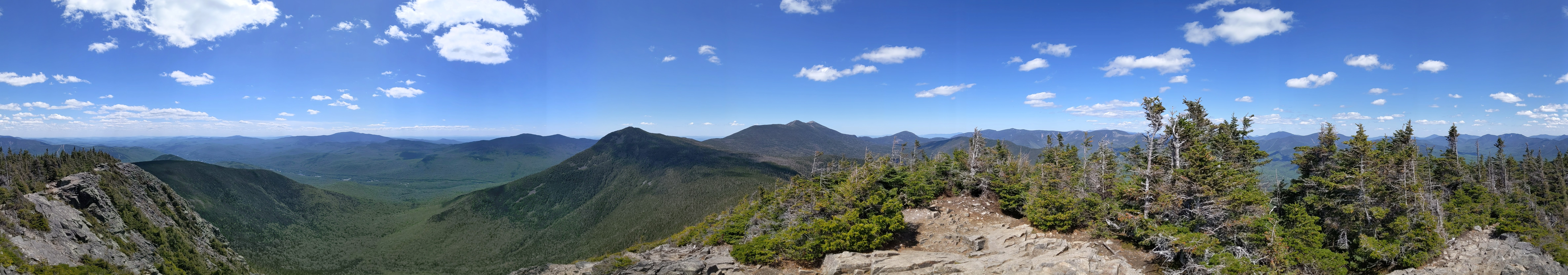
Mt. Flume panorama, looking north

== See also ==
- Four-thousand footers
- White Mountains Region
- List of mountains of New Hampshire
