= White Mountains (New England) =

Mountain range in New Hampshire and Maine, United States

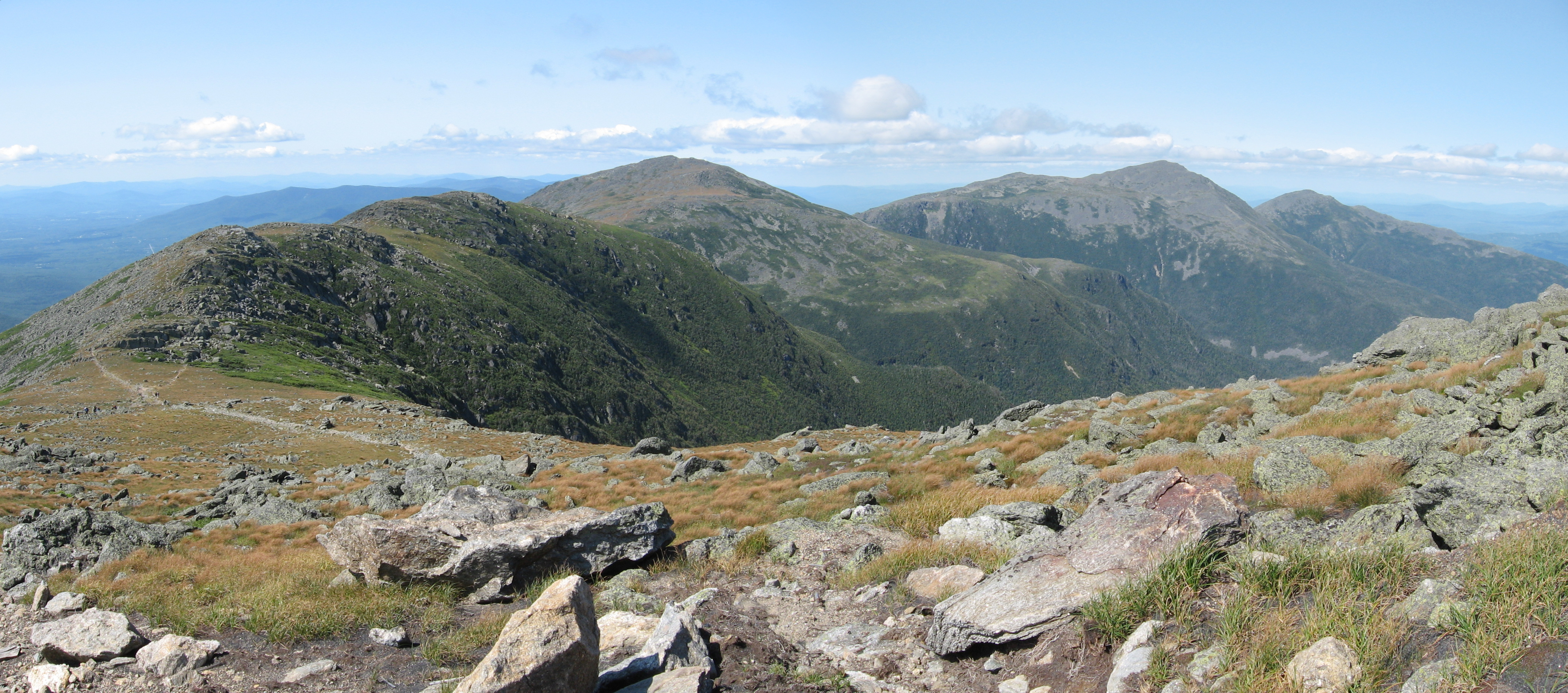
- From left to right: Mount Clay, Mount Jefferson, Mount Adams, and Mount Madison viewed from Mount Washington

Highest point
- Peak: Mount Washington
- Elevation: 6,288 ft (1,917 m)
- Coordinates: 44°16′15″N 71°18′12.5″W

Geography
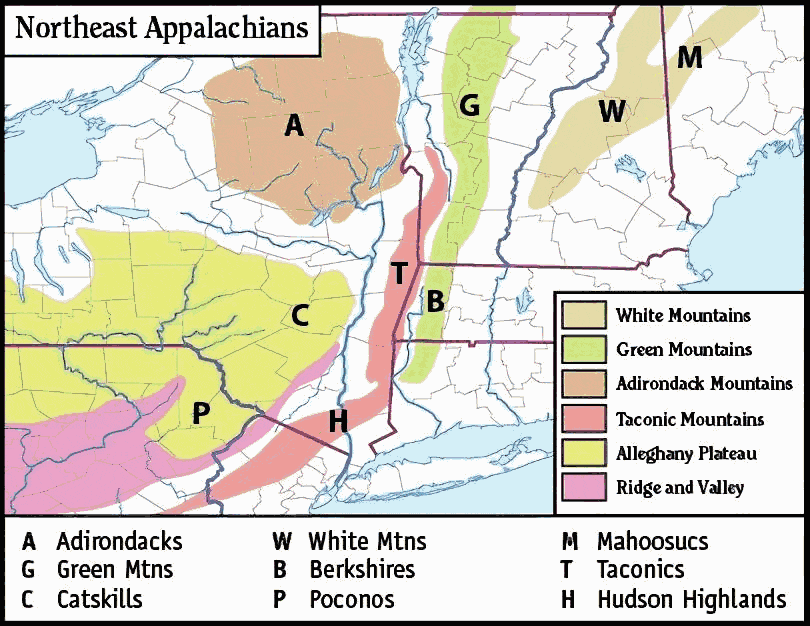
- Map of the main regions of the northeast Appalachians
- Country: United States
- States: New Hampshire; Maine
- Region: New England
- Range coordinates: 44°16′16″N 71°18′18″W
- Parent range: Appalachian Mountains

The White Mountains are a mountain range covering about a quarter of the state of New Hampshire and a small portion of western Maine in the United States. They are a subrange of the northern Appalachian Mountains and the most rugged mountains in New England. Several of the higher peaks contain an Alpine tundra. The range is heavily visited due to its proximity to Boston, New York City, and Montreal.

Most of the area is public land, including the White Mountain National Forest and a number of state parks. Its most famous mountain is 6,288-foot (1,917 m) Mount Washington, which is the highest peak in the Northeastern U.S. and for 76 years held the record for fastest surface wind gust in the world (231 miles per hour (372 km/h) in 1934). Mount Washington is part of a line of summits, the Presidential Range, that are named after U.S. presidents and other prominent Americans.

The White Mountains also include the Franconia Range, Sandwich Range, Carter-Moriah Range and Kinsman Range in New Hampshire, and the Mahoosuc Range straddling the border between it and Maine. In all, there are 48 peaks within New Hampshire as well as one (Old Speck Mountain) in Maine over 4,000 feet (1,200 m), known as the four-thousand footers.

The Whites are known for a system of alpine huts for hikers operated by the Appalachian Mountain Club. The Appalachian Trail crosses the area from southwest to northeast.

== Etymology ==
It is not clear where the name "White Mountains" came from. There is no record of what Native Americans called the range, although pre-Colonial names for many individual peaks are known. The name and similar ones such as "White Hills" or "Wine Hills" are found in literature from Colonial times. According to tradition, the mountains were first sighted from shipboard off the coast near the Piscataqua estuary. The highest peaks would often be snow-capped, appearing white. An alternate theory is that the mica-laden granite of the summits looked white to observers.

== Geology and physiography ==
The White Mountains are a physiographic section of the larger New England province, which in turn is part of the larger Appalachian Highlands physiographic division.

The magma intrusions forming the White Mountains today were created 124 to 100 million years ago as the North American Plate moved westward over the New England hotspot.

Widespread evidence of glaciation may be seen in the U-shaped form of various notches, or mountain passes. Glacial cirques form the heads of Tuckerman Ravine on Mt. Washington and King Ravine on Mt. Adams. Glacial striations are visible at numerous locations, including on the exposed rocks at the summit of Pine Mountain in Gorham.

The Red Hill Syenite, a rock unit of the White Mountains, found in central New Hampshire, is of interest to researchers due to the fact that it contains feldspathoids as well as quartz-bearing rocks.

== Attractions ==
The White Mountain National Forest, formed in 1911 after passage of the Weeks Act, includes most of the mountain range and now covers 800,000 acres (3,200 km^{2}) in New Hampshire and western Maine. The Mount Washington Auto Road and Mount Washington Cog Railway ascend the range's highest peak, which hosts a visitor center and weather observatory. Heavily visited Arethusa Falls, the second tallest waterfall in New Hampshire, lies on a southwest flank of Crawford Notch. The Old Man of the Mountain, a rock formation on Cannon Mountain that resembled the craggy profile of a man's face, was a White Mountain landmark until it fell in May 2003. It remains the state symbol of New Hampshire. The range also includes a natural feature dubbed "The Basin", consisting of a granite bowl, 20 feet (6 m) in diameter, fed by a waterfall, worn smooth by the Pemigewasset River. The areas around The Basin are popular spots for swimming in the cold water.

The range is crossed north–south by U.S. Route 3 and Interstate 93 through Franconia Notch and New Hampshire Route 16 through Pinkham Notch, and east–west by the Kancamagus Highway (part of New Hampshire Route 112) through Kancamagus Pass and U.S. Route 302 through Crawford Notch. Many of these highways are designated as scenic routes.

Several amusement parks lie in or near the White Mountains, including Story Land, Santa's Village, Whale's Tale Water Park and Clark's Trading Post. The White Mountains region is also home to numerous hiking attractions through the various river gorges, ravines, and caves in the area. The Flume Gorge, Lost River Reservation and Polar Caves Park all provide moderate hikes that one can complete in a few hours. Skiing is a popular attraction in the area. Cannon Mountain Ski Area, Loon Mountain Ski Resort, Attitash Mountain Resort, Wildcat Mountain Ski Area, Bretton Woods Mountain Resort, and Waterville Valley Resort are all popular winter ski resorts, and many of them provide year-round outdoor activities such as bridle paths, hiking trails, alpine slides, and the like. The Mount Washington Hotel located in Bretton Woods was the site of the Bretton Woods Conference following World War II, and today remains one of the few early twentieth century grand hotels still in use. An estimated six million visitors visit the region yearly.

== Mapping ==
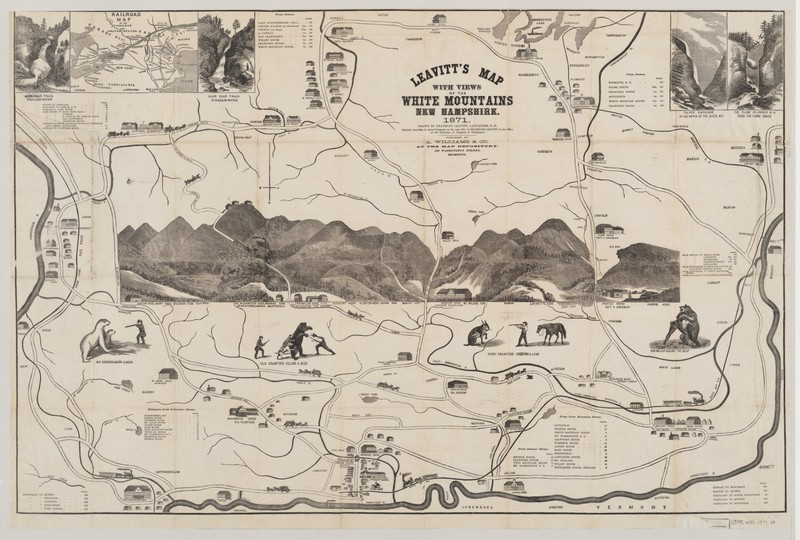
Map of the White Mountains, Franklin Leavitt, 1871

Some of the earliest maps of the White Mountains were produced as tourist maps and not topographical maps. One of the first two tourist maps of the mountains was that produced by Franklin Leavitt, a self-taught artist born near Lancaster, New Hampshire in 1824. Leavitt's hand-drawn map, today in the collection of Harvard University, is largely folk art, but does convey some of the region's features. Leavitt drew several versions of his map, beginning in 1852. The fourth version, printed in 1871, was printed at Boston and carried a retail price of one dollar. Other early maps of the region were drawn by H. Conant and by Harvard astronomer George Phillips Bond, who published the first topographical map of the region in 1853.

== Art ==
The White Mountains drew hundreds of painters during the 19th century. This group of artists is sometimes referred to as belonging to the "White Mountain school" of art. Others dispute the notion that these painters were a "school", since they did not all paint in the same style as, for example, those artists of the Hudson River School.

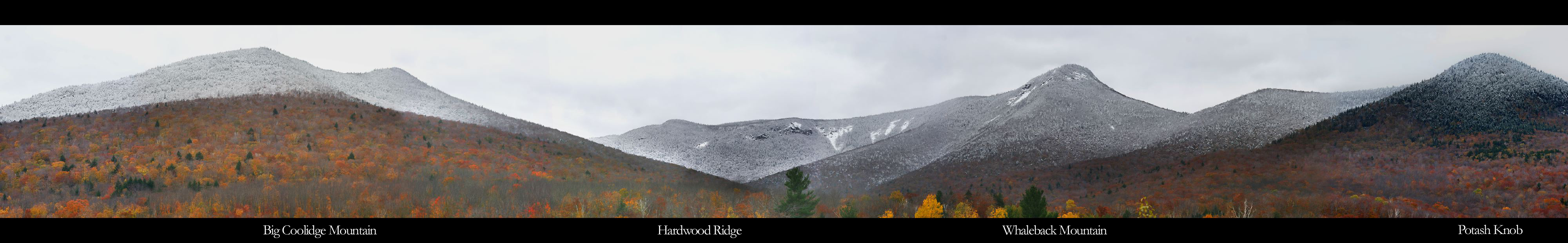
Peaks of the Franconia Range of the White Mountains as viewed from Loon Mountain resort after an October snowfall, looking to the north.

== In literature and drama ==
Nathaniel Hawthorne chose the White Mountains as the setting for his short story "The Great Carbuncle". Other White Mountain tales by Hawthorne include "The Ambitious Guest", "Sketches from Memory" and "The Great Stone Face". The White Mountain region also figures prominently in the writings of Louisa May Alcott, including the novel Eight Cousins and its sequel, Rose in Bloom.

== See also ==
- List of mountain passes in New Hampshire
- List of mountains of New Hampshire
- List of subranges of the Appalachian Mountains
- White Mountains Region
