= Twin Mountain =

Twin Mountain may refer to a location in the United States:

- Twin Mountain, New Hampshire, a village in Grafton County
- The Twin Mountains, a pair of summits in the White Mountains:
  - South Twin Mountain (New Hampshire)
  - North Twin Mountain (New Hampshire)
- Twin Mountain (Greene County, New York), a summit in the Catskill Mountains
