= The Cannon Balls =

Mountain ridge in New Hampshire, United States

The Cannon Balls (East peak)
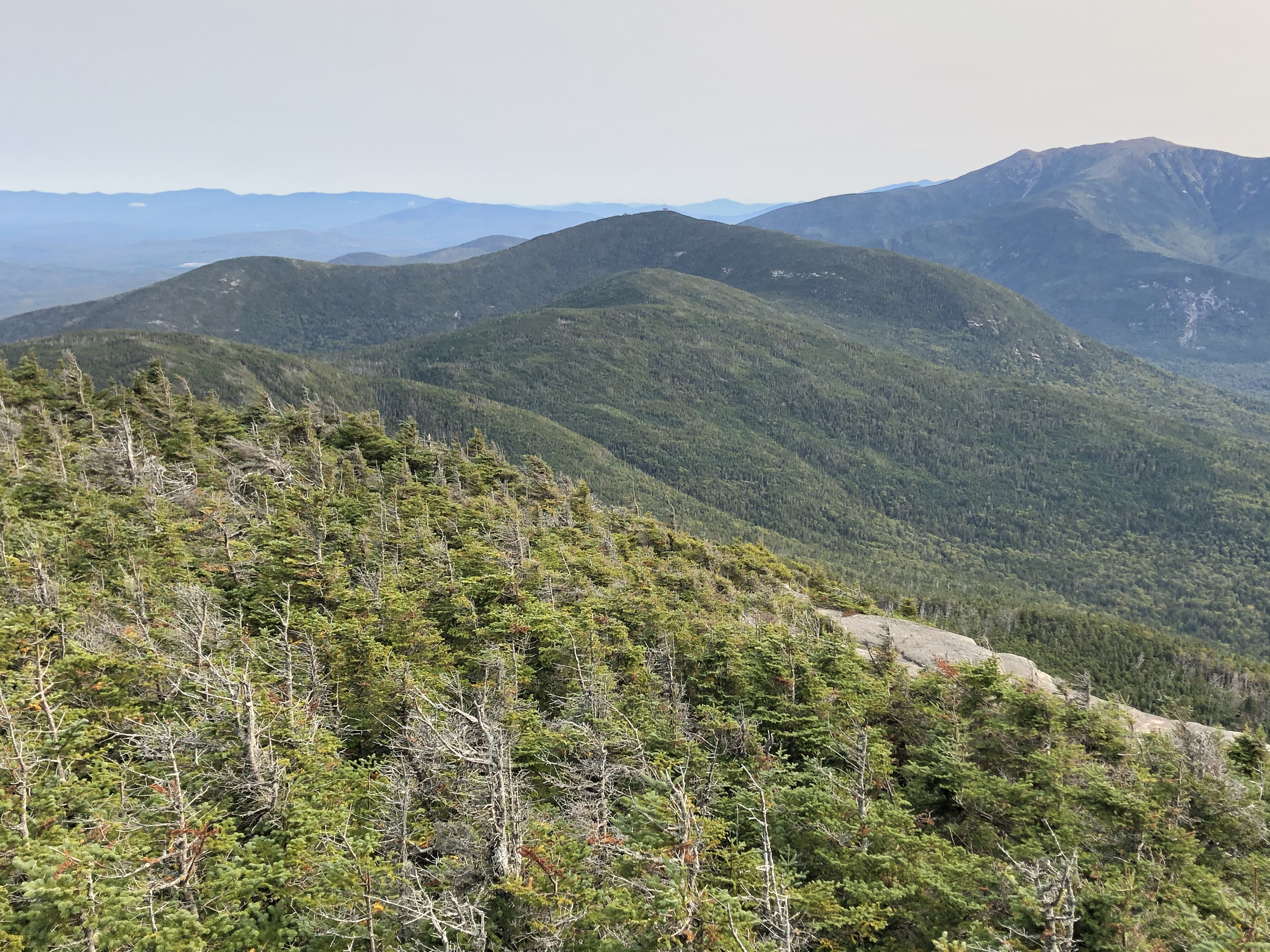
- The Cannon Balls are the three rounded peaks running from center left to center of the photo, in front of Cannon Mountain. The highest Cannon Ball is closest to Cannon Mountain. Mount Lafayette is on the right.

Highest point
- Elevation: 3,769 feet (1,149 m)
- Prominence: 190 feet (58 m)
- Listing: #100 N.E. Hundred Highest
- Coordinates: 44°9′00″N 71°42′37″W

Geography
- Location: Grafton County, New Hampshire
- Parent range: Kinsman Range
- Topo map: USGS Franconia

Climbing
- Easiest route: hiking trail

The Cannon Balls is a mountain ridge located in Grafton County, New Hampshire. It is part of the Kinsman Range of the White Mountains. The ridge has three peaks with elevations of, from west to east, 3,693, 3,660, and 3,769 feet (1,125, 1,115 and 1,148 meters). The ridge takes its name from adjacent Cannon Mountain, on which a series of boulders, when viewed from the foot of the mountain, resemble an antique artillery cannon. The Cannon Balls are flanked to the northeast by Cannon Mountain, and to the southwest by Kinsman Mountain.

The south side of the ridge drains into Cascade Brook, thence into the Pemigewasset River, the Merrimack River, and into the Gulf of Maine in Massachusetts. The north side drains into Coppermine Brook, thence into the Ham Branch of the Gale River, the Gale River, Ammonoosuc River, Connecticut River, and into Long Island Sound in Connecticut.

The Appalachian Trail, a 2,170-mile (3,490 km) National Scenic Trail from Georgia to Maine, runs across the southern base of the Cannon Balls between North Kinsman and Franconia Notch.

== See also ==
- List of mountains in New Hampshire
- White Mountain National Forest
- New England Hundred Highest
