= North Branch Gale River =

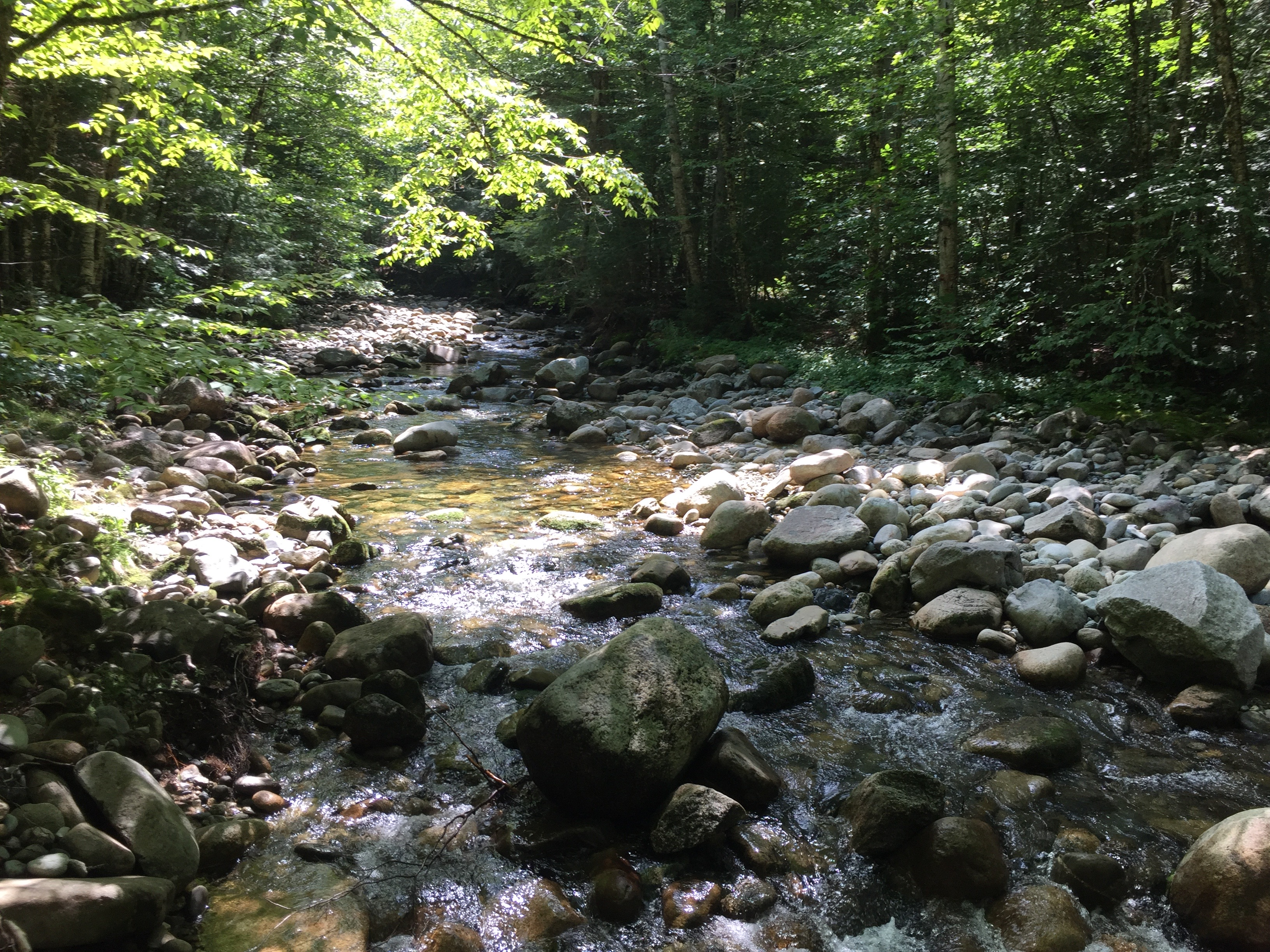
- The North Branch, south of U.S. Route 3

- Location within New Hampshire Location within the United States

Location
- Country: United States
- State: New Hampshire
- County: Grafton
- Towns: Franconia, Bethlehem

Physical characteristics
- Source: Galehead Mountain, South Twin Mountain
  - location: Franconia
  - coordinates: 44°11′27″N 71°33′50″W
  - elevation: 3,720 ft (1,130 m)
- Mouth: Gale River
  - location: Bethlehem
  - coordinates: 44°14′37″N 71°38′17″W
  - elevation: 1,306 ft (398 m)
- Length: 5.8 mi (9.3 km)

The North Branch of the Gale River is a 5.8-mile-long (9.3 km) river in the White Mountains of New Hampshire in the United States. Via the Gale River, it is a tributary of the Ammonoosuc River and part of the Connecticut River watershed.

The North Branch rises in the valley between South Twin and Galehead mountains, just north of the AMC Galehead Hut. It flows northwest out of the mountains, largely followed by the Gale River Trail (a hiking trail), and joins the South Branch to form the Gale River at the crossing of U.S. Route 3. The river flows entirely through the White Mountain National Forest, except for a short section where it passes through a small reservoir owned by the town of Littleton water department.

== See also ==
- List of rivers of New Hampshire
