= Galehead Mountain =

Mountain in the state of New Hampshire

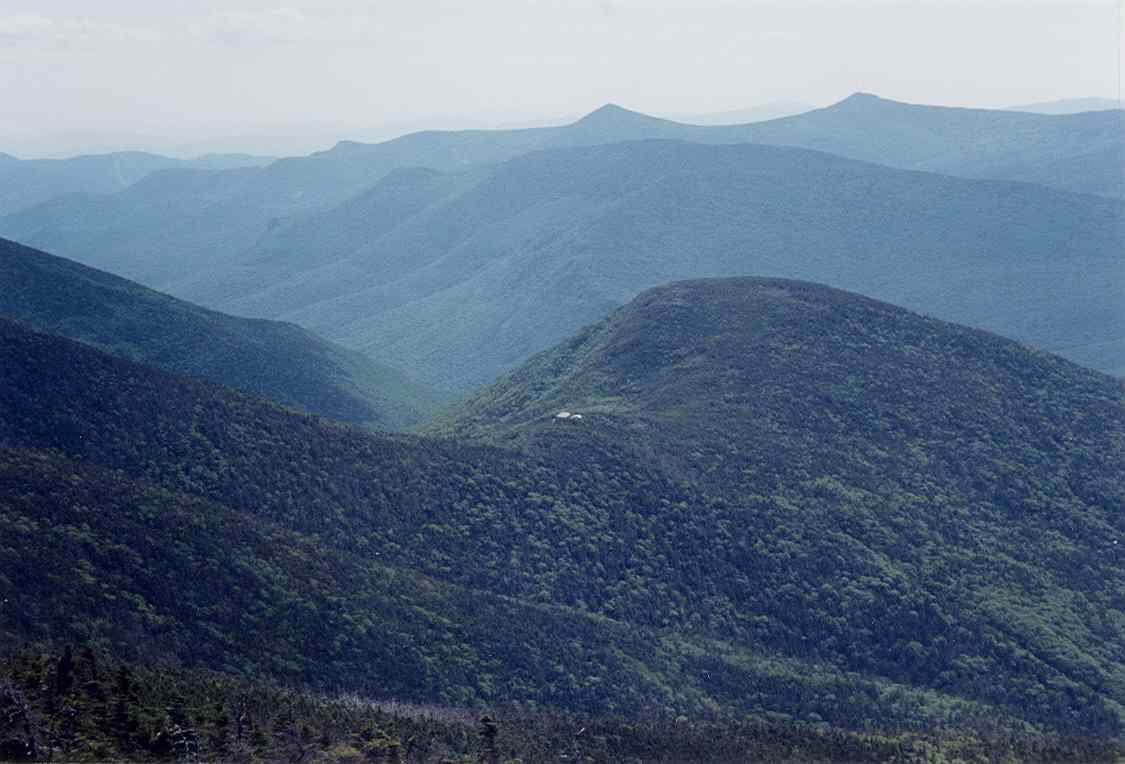
- Galehead Mountain and AMC Galehead Hut

Highest point
- Elevation: 4,024 ft (1,227 m)
- Prominence: 264 ft (80 m)
- Listing: White Mountain 4000-Footers
- Coordinates: 44°11′5.32″N 71°34′24.21″W

Geography
- Location within New Hampshire
- Location: Grafton County, New Hampshire, U.S.
- Parent range: Twin Range
- Topo map: USGS South Twin Mountain

Galehead Mountain is a mountain located in Grafton County, New Hampshire. The mountain is part of the Twin Range of the White Mountains. Galehead is flanked to the east by South Twin Mountain, and to the west by Mount Garfield. The summit is reached by the Frost Trail which departs from Galehead Hut (operated by the Appalachian Mountain Club). There are several ways to reach the hut, the Gale River Trail from the northwest being the most direct from a road.

Galehead is so named because it is located above the headwaters of the North Branch of the Gale River. The north face of Galehead drains into the North Branch, thence via the Gale River into the Ammonoosuc and Connecticut rivers, and into Long Island Sound in Connecticut. The southeast face of Galehead drains into Twin Brook, thence into the Franconia Branch of the East Branch of the Pemigewasset River, through the Pemigewasset Wilderness, thence into the Pemigewasset and Merrimack rivers, and into the Gulf of Maine in Massachusetts. The west face of Galehead also drains into the Franconia Branch.

The Appalachian Trail, a 2,170-mile (3,490 km) National Scenic Trail from Georgia to Maine, crosses the northern face of Galehead, 0.2 mi (0.3 km) north — and 400 feet (120 m) below — the summit. The Appalachian Mountain Club's Galehead Hut is located in the col between Galehead and South Twin.

== See also ==
- List of mountains in New Hampshire
- White Mountain National Forest
