= Mount Garfield (New Hampshire) =

Mountain in the state of New Hampshire

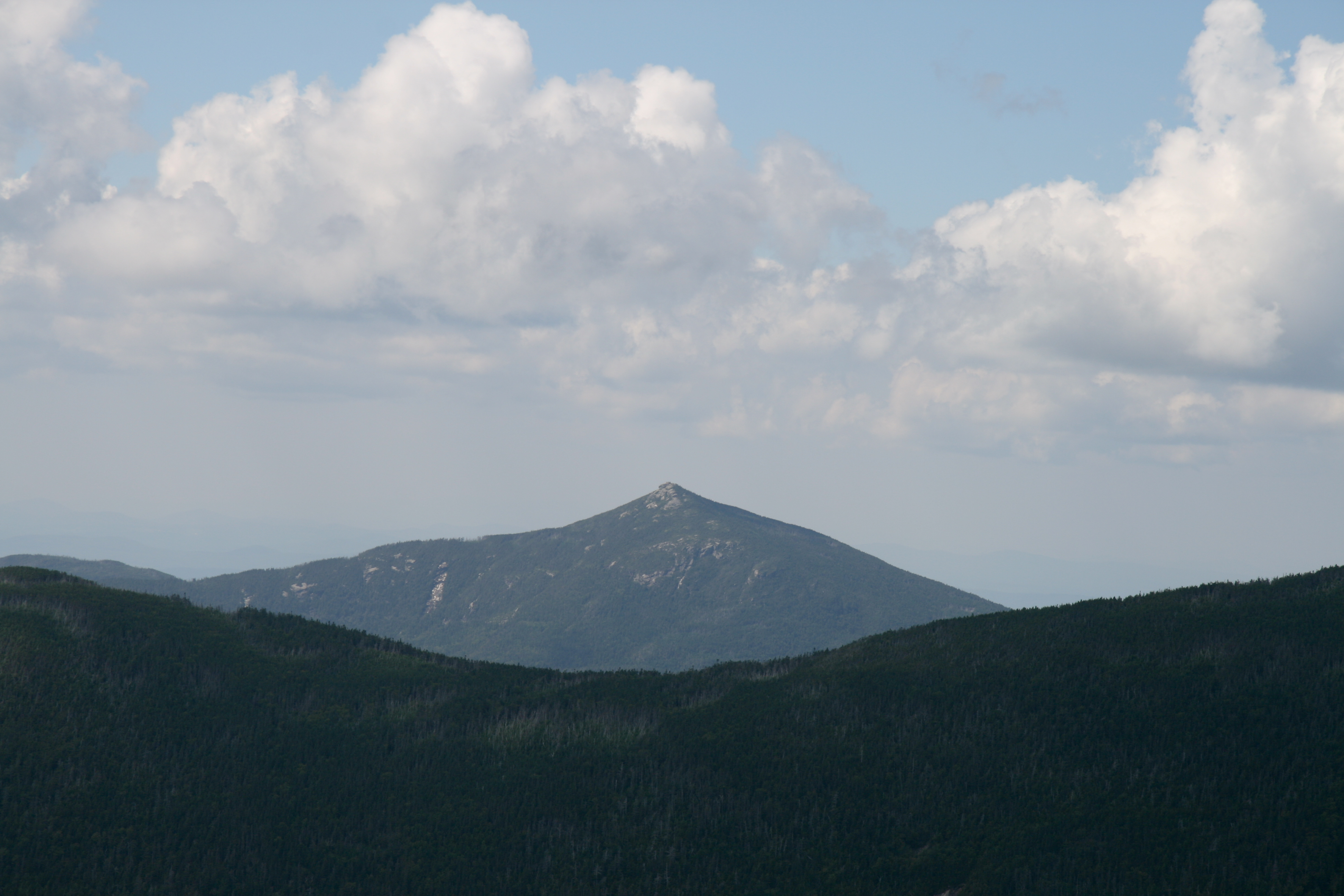
- Mt. Garfield as seen from Mt. Guyot, August 2009.

Highest point
- Elevation: 4480+ ft (1366+ m)
- Prominence: 800 ft (240 m)
- Listing: White Mountain 4000-Footers
- Coordinates: 44°11′13″N 71°36′39″W

Geography
- Location: Grafton County, New Hampshire, U.S.
- Parent range: White Mountains
- Topo map: USGS South Twin Mountain

Mount Garfield is a mountain located in Grafton County, New Hampshire. The mountain is part of the White Mountains. Mt. Garfield is flanked to the east by South Twin Mountain, and to the southwest along Garfield Ridge by Mount Lafayette.

The south faces of Garfield drain into the Franconia Branch of the East Branch of the Pemigewasset River, through the Pemigewasset Wilderness, thence into the Pemigewasset and Merrimack rivers, and into the Gulf of Maine at Newburyport, Massachusetts. The north faces of Garfield drain into the north and south branches of the Gale River, thence into the Ammonoosuc and Connecticut rivers, and into Long Island Sound at Old Saybrook, Connecticut.

The Appalachian Trail, a 2,170-mile (3,500-km) National Scenic Trail from Georgia to Maine, runs along the ridge, across the summit of Garfield.

== See also ==
- List of mountains in New Hampshire
- White Mountain National Forest
