= Kinsman Mountain =

Mountain in New Hampshire, United States

Kinsman Mountain (South Peak)
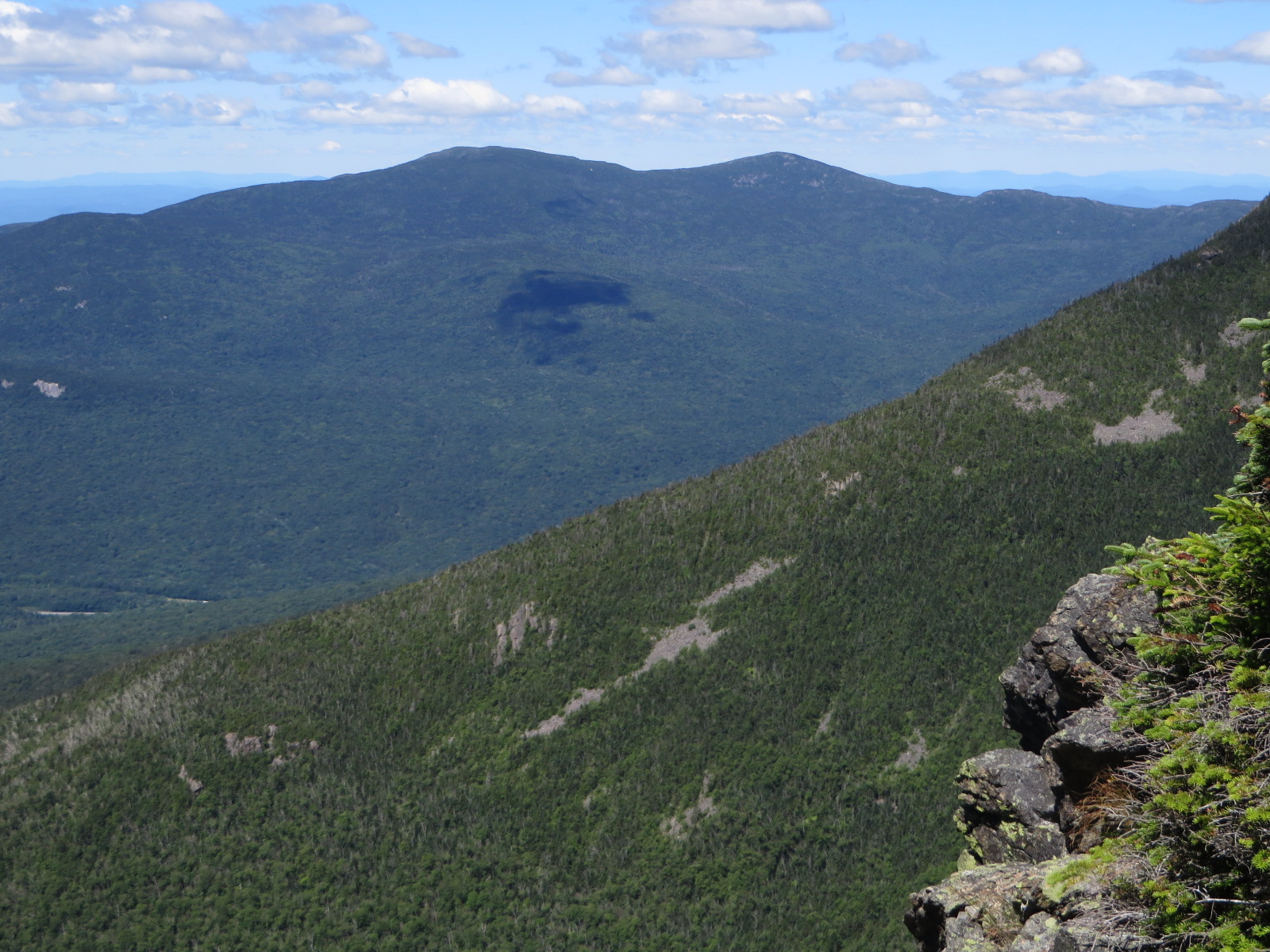
- Kinsman as seen from Mount Flume. South Peak is to the left.

Highest point
- Elevation: 4,358 ft (1,328 m)
- Prominence: 2,240 ft (680 m)
- Listing: White Mountain 4000-footers #20 New England Fifty Finest
- Coordinates: 44°7.38′N 71°44.20′W

Geography
- Location: Grafton County, New Hampshire, U.S.
- Parent range: Kinsman Range
- Topo map: USGS Lincoln

Kinsman Mountain (North Peak)
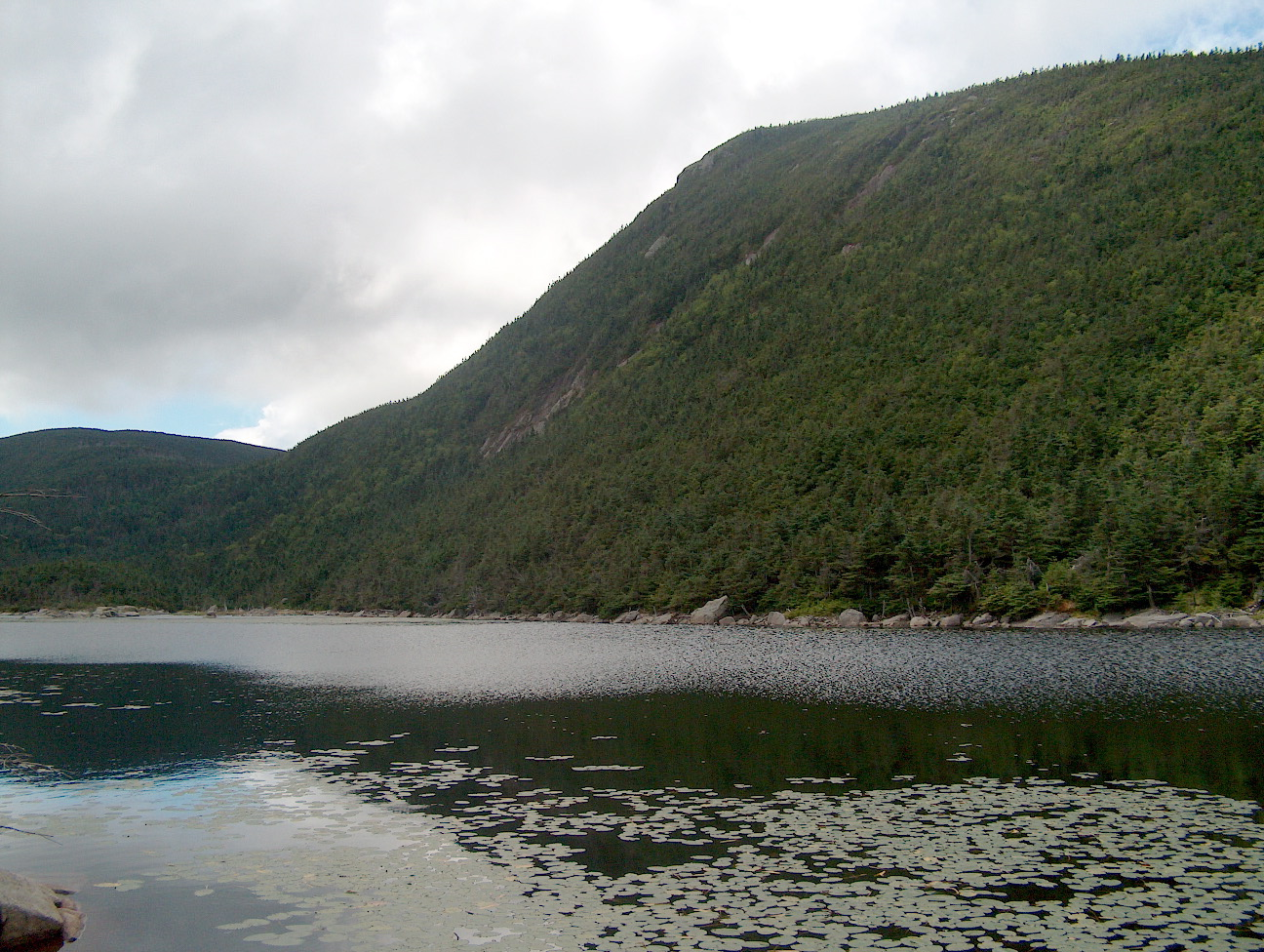
- North Peak of Kinsman, overlooking Kinsman Pond

Highest point
- Elevation: 4,293 ft (1,309 m)
- Prominence: 275 ft (84 m)
- Listing: White Mountain 4000-footers
- Coordinates: 44°7.99′N 71°44.21′W

Geography
- Topo map: USGS Franconia

Kinsman Mountain is a mountain located in Grafton County, New Hampshire. It is named after Nathan Kinsman, an early resident of Easton, New Hampshire, and is part of the Kinsman Range of the White Mountains. To the northeast, Kinsman is connected by The Cannon Balls ridge to Cannon Mountain.

The west side of Kinsman drains into Reel and Slide Brooks, thence into the Ham Branch of the Gale River, the Gale River, Ammonoosuc River, Connecticut River, and into Long Island Sound in Connecticut. The east side drains into Cascade Brook, thence into the Pemigewasset River, the Merrimack River, and into the Gulf of Maine in Massachusetts. The south face drains into Eliza Brook, thence into Harvard Brook, another tributary of the Pemigewasset.

The Appalachian Mountain Club considers both North and South Kinsman to be "four-thousand footers" because the divide between them gives the former more than 200 ft (61 m) of topographic prominence. South Kinsman is the sixth most prominent of the White Mountains, and is the highest point between Franconia Notch and Kinsman Notch.

The summit of North Kinsman Mountain is viewless, but a short bushwhack to the east takes hikers to steep granite ledges that fall off to Kinsman Pond and offer views of Cannon Mountain, South Kinsman, Franconia Ridge, and Lonesome Lake.

== See also ==
- List of mountains in New Hampshire
- White Mountain National Forest
