= Twin Mountains =

Mountains in New Hampshire, USA

Coordinates: 44.27077°N 71.54022°W

The Twin Mountains are a pair of mountains located in Franconia, New Hampshire. The Twin Mountains are composed of North Twin Mountain and South Twin Mountain, which are linked by the North Twin Trail. The village of Twin Mountain in the town of Carroll is named after these mountains.
