= Franconia, New Hampshire =

- Town
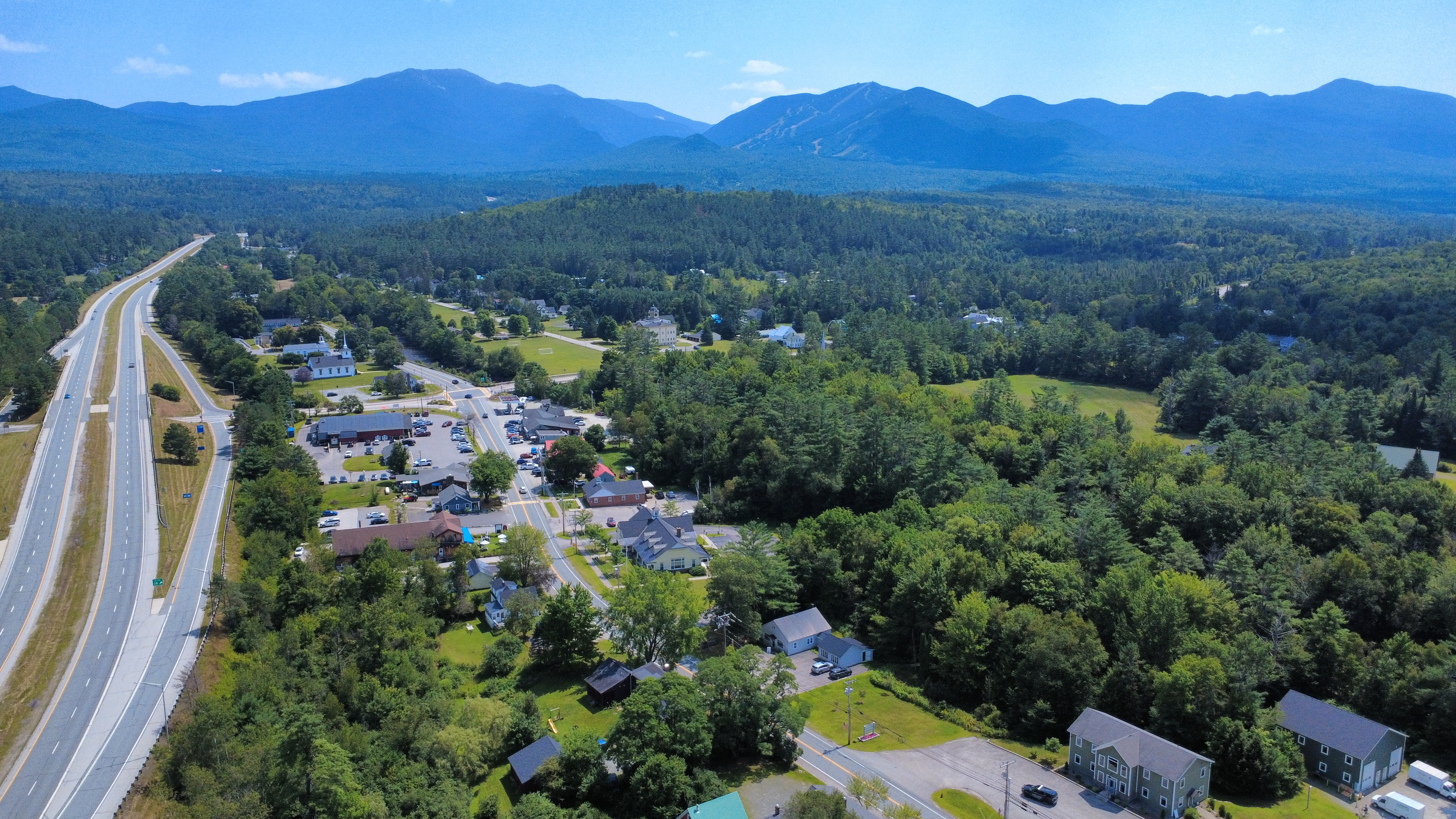
- View of Franconia, NH, from the northeast
- Motto: "Explore the Road Not Taken"
- Location in Grafton County, New Hampshire
- Coordinates: 44°11′03″N 71°39′41″W
- Country: United States
- State: New Hampshire
- County: Grafton
- Incorporated: 1764

Area
  - Total: 65.8 sq mi (170.5 km^{2})
  - Land: 65.5 sq mi (169.7 km^{2})
  - Water: 0.31 sq mi (0.8 km^{2}) 0.47%
- Elevation: 2,736 ft (834 m)

Population (2020)
  - Total: 1,083
  - Density: 17/sq mi (6.4/km^{2})
- Time zone: UTC-5 (Eastern)
  - Summer (DST): UTC-4 (Eastern)
- ZIP code: 03580
- Area code: 603
- FIPS code: 33-27300
- GNIS feature ID: 873599
- Website: www.franconianh.org

Franconia is a town in Grafton County, New Hampshire, United States. The population was 1,083 at the 2020 census. Set in the White Mountains, Franconia is home to the northern half of Franconia Notch State Park. Parts of the White Mountain National Forest are in the eastern and southern portions of the town. The Appalachian Trail crosses the town.

== History ==
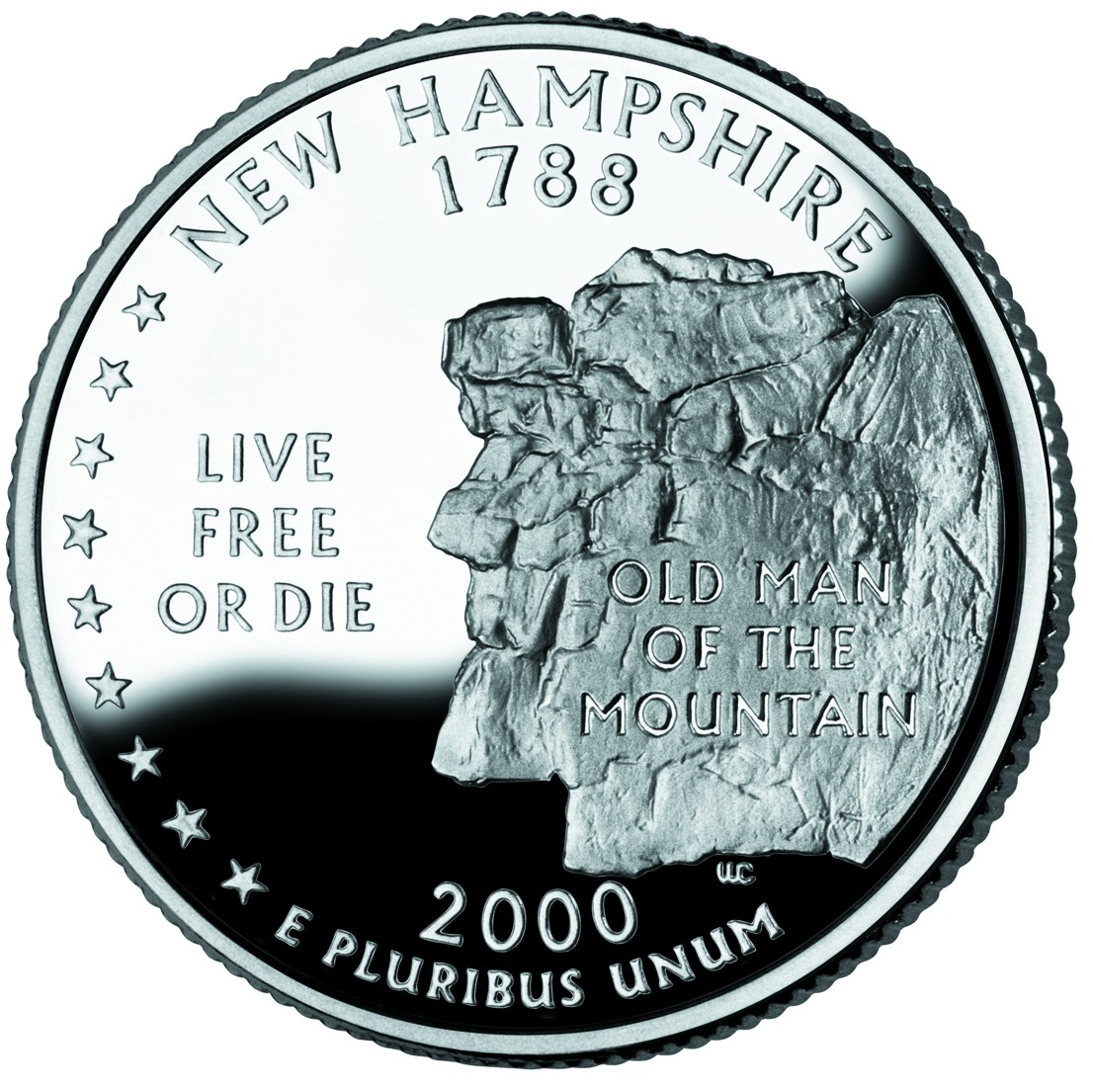
Old Man of the Mountain on the New Hampshire quarter

Town status was first granted in 1764 by colonial Governor Benning Wentworth as "Franconia", a name widely applied to the region by 1760 due to the terrain's resemblance to the Franconian Switzerland in Upper Franconia, Bavaria, Germany. Upon claims that a settlement was not made within the time prescribed under the terms of the charter, it was regranted in 1772 by his nephew, Governor John Wentworth, as "Morristown". Sometime between 1779 and 1782, after a legal battle over the two grants, the first grant was recognized and the original name of the town was resumed.

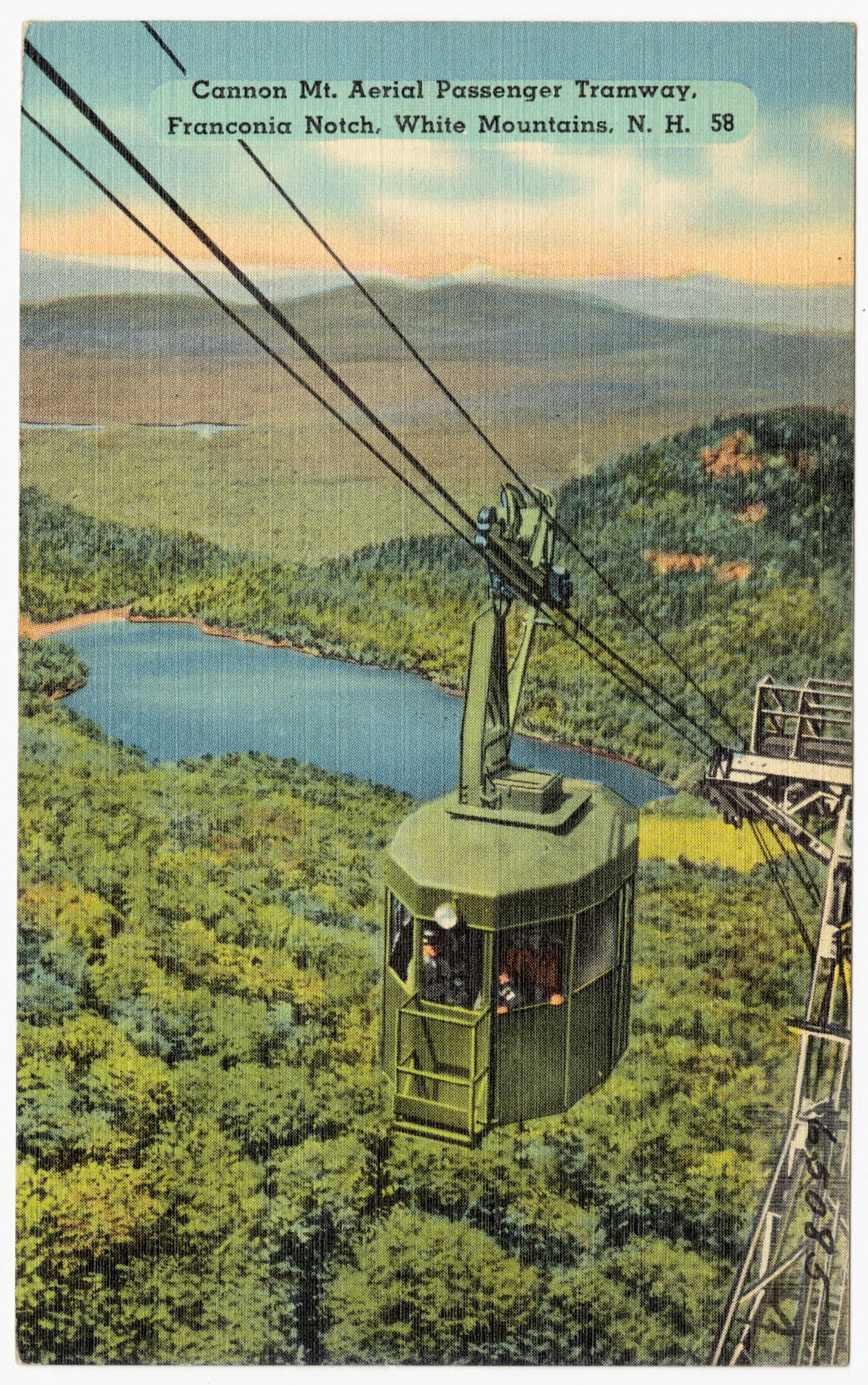
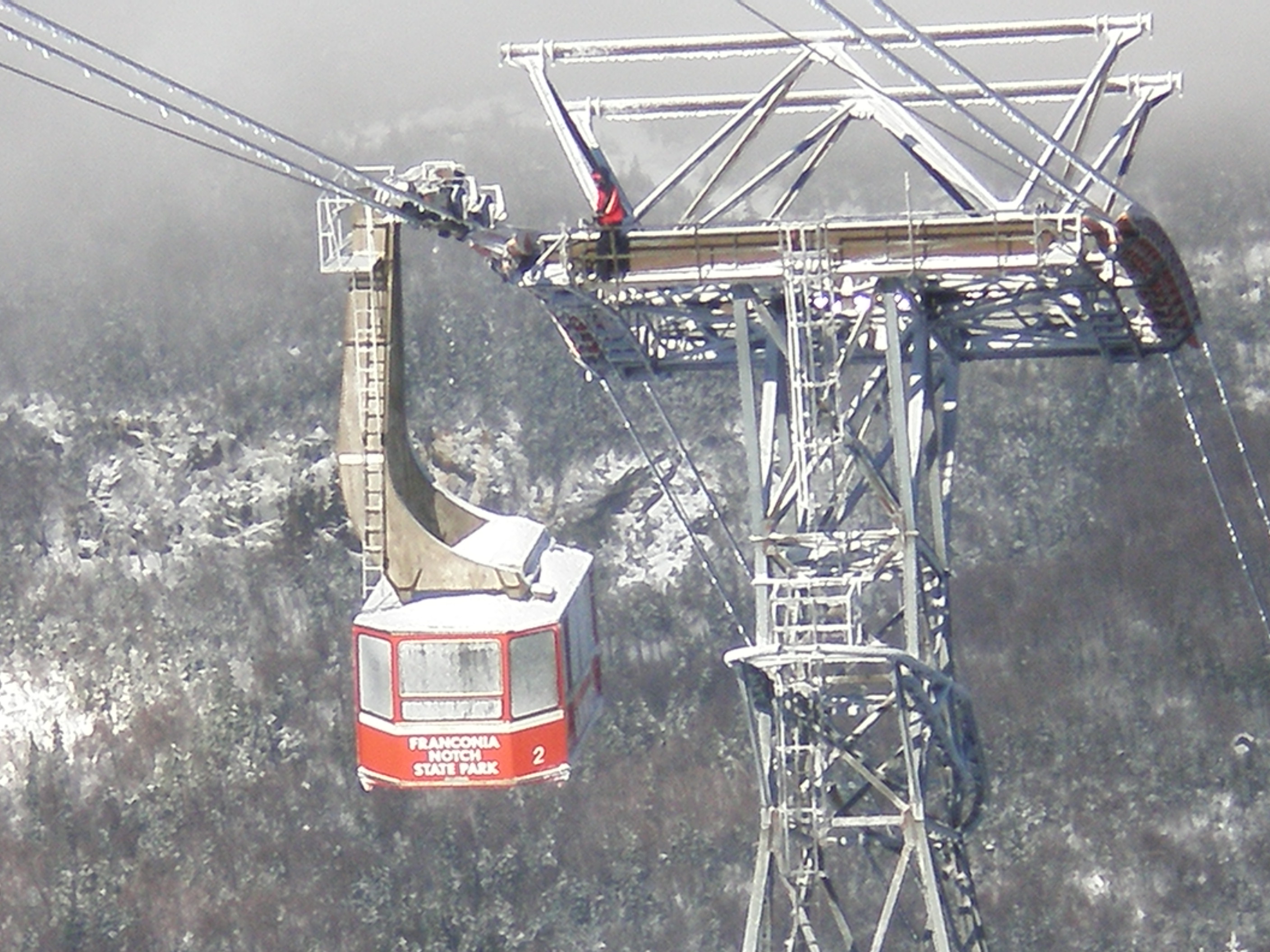
Cannon Mountain Aerial Tramway (old and new)

The town sits on a rich iron deposit, and the region once produced pig iron and bar iron for farm tools and cast iron ware.

Franconia is home to the Cannon Mountain Aerial Tramway, which rises to the 4,100-foot (1,200 m) summit of Cannon Mountain. Built in 1938, it was the first passenger aerial tramway in North America. From the time of its construction in 1938 to its retirement in 1980, the original tramway carried 6,581,338 passengers to the summit of Cannon Mountain. The original tramway was replaced by a new 80-passenger tram in 1979. Construction and testing of the new tram were completed in February 1980, and the red and yellow tram cars were still running year-round as of 2015.

Around 1940, actress Bette Davis vacationed in Sugar Hill, the town bordering Franconia to the west. On a solo hike to Bridal Veil Falls at the western foot of Cannon Mountain, she got lost in the woods. Arthur Farnsworth, who worked at Peckett's Ski School, found her and rescued her from the woods. They fell in love and soon married. Farnsworth died unexpectedly as a result of freak accident in Los Angeles. Davis had a plaque placed in a rock on the trail to Bridal Veil Falls to commemorate Farnsworth, in which was inscribed the words "The Keeper of Stray Ladies", although Davis did not include her name in the plaque. The plaque can be seen today on the Coppermine Trail to Bridal Veil Falls.

The town was home to Franconia College during the 1960s and 1970s.

== Geography ==
According to the United States Census Bureau, the town has a total area of 65.8 square miles (170.5 km^{2}), of which 65.5 square miles (169.7 km^{2}) are land and 0.3 square miles (0.8 km^{2}) are water, comprising 0.47% of the town. Franconia is drained by the Pemigewasset River, the Franconia Branch of the East Branch Pemigewasset River, the Gale River, and the Ham Branch of the Gale River, in addition to Lafayette Brook. The north-western two-thirds of Franconia lies within the Connecticut River watershed, while the southeastern portion which drains to the Pemigewasset and its branches lies in the Merrimack River watershed.

The area of Franconia Notch is well known for its natural features, including Profile and Echo lakes, the Basin, Mount Lafayette, Mount Lincoln, and Cannon Mountain. Mount Lafayette, at 5,249 feet (1,600 m) above sea level, is the highest peak in Franconia and in Grafton County, as well as the second-most prominent peak in the White Mountains, after Mount Washington. The Old Man of the Mountain, a profile-like cliff on the side of Cannon Mountain which inspired Nathaniel Hawthorne to write "The Great Stone Face", collapsed on May 3, 2003.

In addition to the mountains around Franconia Notch, there are several other four-thousand footers within the town limits: Mount Garfield, Galehead Mountain, South Twin Mountain, and Owl's Head.

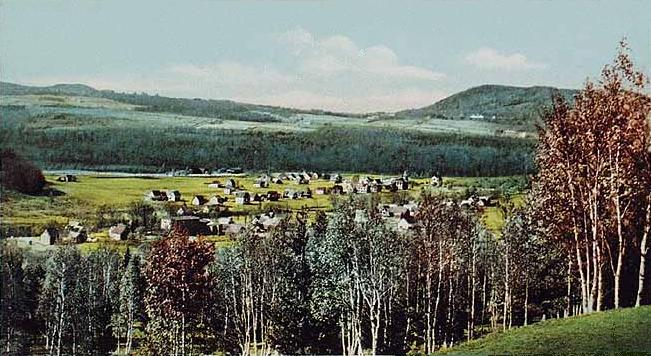
Franconia Village with Sugar Hills background c. 1908

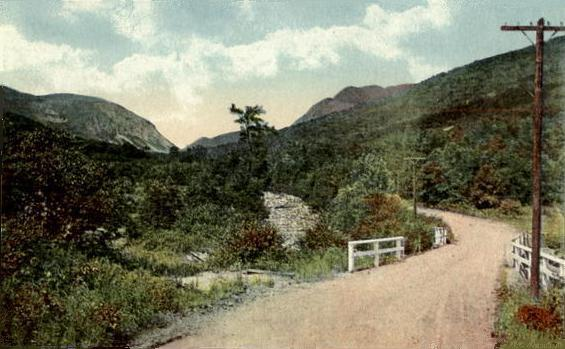
Franconia Notch, c. 1915

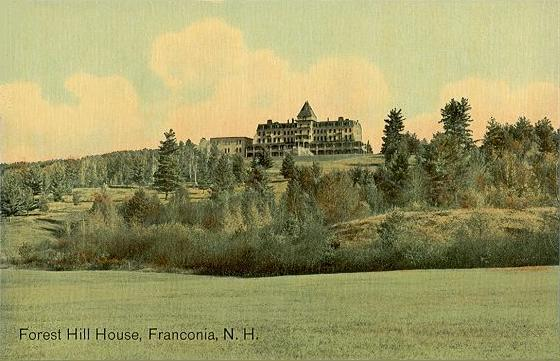
Forest Hill House, c. 1909

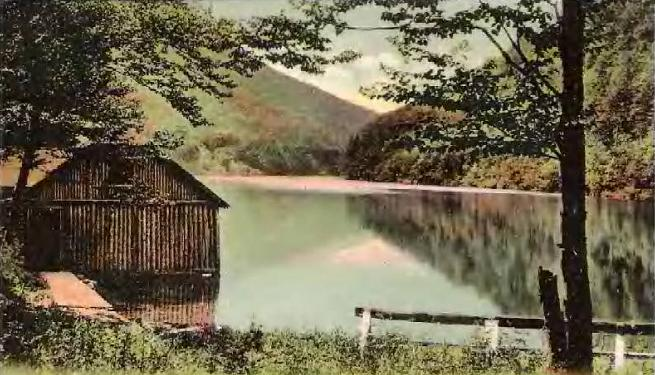
Echo Lake c. 1905

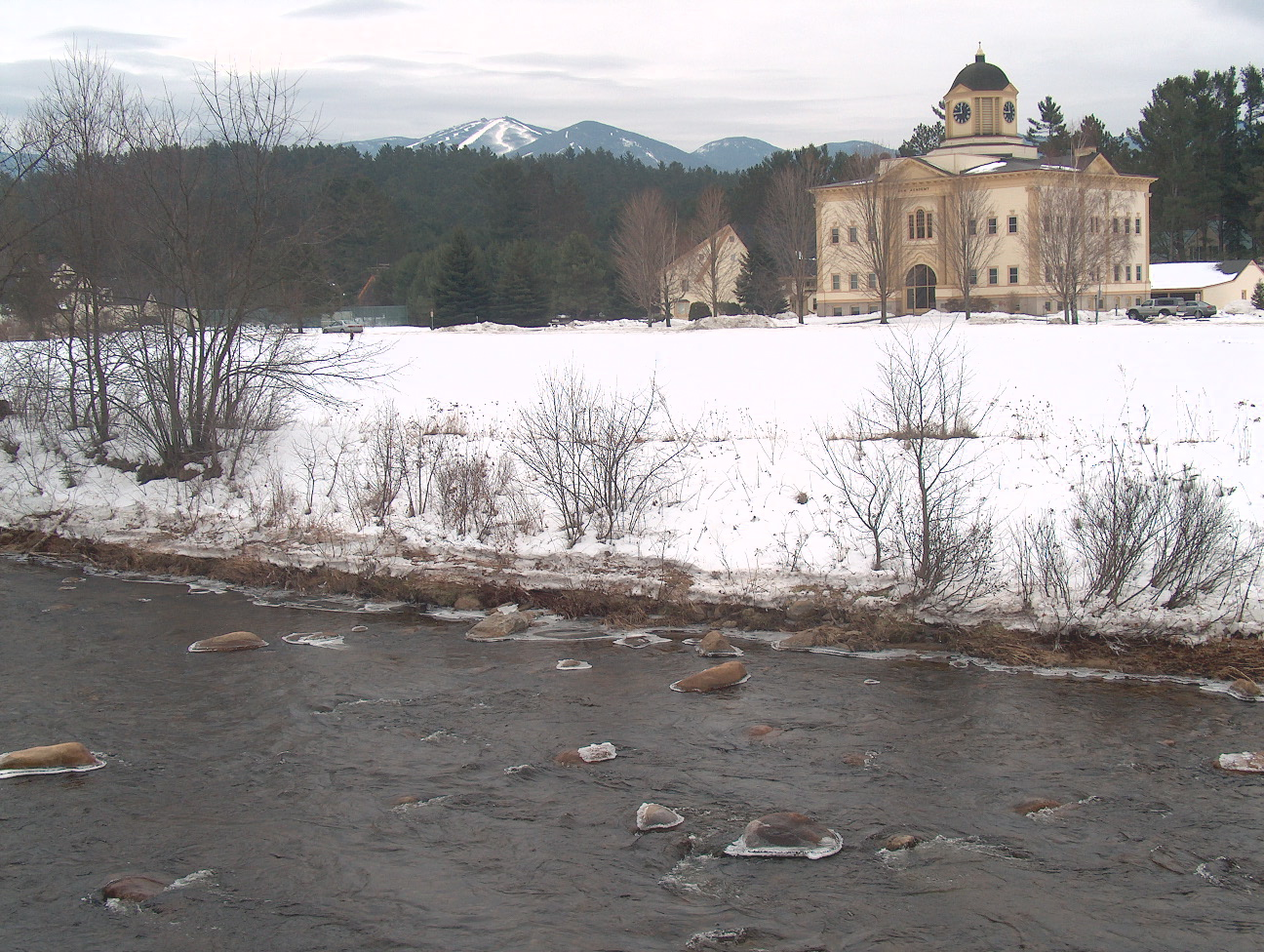
Cannon Mountain rising over Franconia village in 2007

== Demographics ==
Historical population
Census	Pop.	Note	%±
1790	72		—
1800	129		79.2%
1810	358		177.5%
1820	373		4.2%
1830	443		18.8%
1840	523		18.1%
1850	584		11.7%
1860	708		21.2%
1870	549		−22.5%
1880	550		0.2%
1890	594		8.0%
1900	655		10.3%
1910	504		−23.1%
1920	440		−12.7%
1930	514		16.8%
1940	568		10.5%
1950	549		−3.3%
1960	491		−10.6%
1970	655		33.4%
1980	743		13.4%
1990	811		9.2%
2000	924		13.9%
2010	1,104		19.5%
2020	1,083		−1.9%
U.S. Decennial Census

=== 2020 census ===
The 2020 United States census counted 1,083 people, 473 households, and 305 families in Franconia. The population density was 16.5 per square mile (6.4/km^{2}). There were 838 housing units at an average density of 12.8 per square mile (4.9/km^{2}). The racial makeup was 94.37% (1,022) white or European American (94.37% non-Hispanic white), 0.74% (8) black or African-American, 0.28% (3) Native American or Alaska Native, 1.2% (13) Asian, 0.0% (0) Pacific Islander or Native Hawaiian, 0.83% (9) from other races, and 2.59% (28) from two or more races. Hispanic or Latino people of any race were 0.92% (10) of the population.

Of the 473 households, 20.1% had children under the age of 18; 54.1% were married couples living together; 22.6% had a female householder with no spouse or partner present. 27.5% of households consisted of individuals and 15.6% had someone living alone who was 65 years of age or older. The average household size was 2.3 and the average family size was 2.7. The percent of those with a bachelor's degree or higher was estimated to be 43.9% of the population.

15.0% of the population was under the age of 18, 5.0% from 18 to 24, 12.9% from 25 to 44, 32.4% from 45 to 64, and 34.7% who were 65 years of age or older. The median age was 58.0 years. For every 100 females, there were 101.7 males. For every 100 females ages 18 and older, there were 106.5 males.

The 2016–2020 5-year American Community Survey estimates show that the median household income was $92,689 (with a margin of error of +/- $24,260). The median family income was $94,924 (+/- $30,588). Males had a median income of $23,214 (+/- $18,832) versus $26,042 (+/- $12,775) for females. The median income for those above 16 years old was $24,609 (+/- $13,298). Approximately, 1.0% of families and 1.2% of the population were below the poverty line, including 5.1% of those under the age of 18 and 0.0% of those ages 65 or over.

=== 2000 census ===
As of the census of 2000, there were 924 people, 384 households, and 243 families residing in the town. The population density was 14.0 inhabitants per square mile (5.4/km^{2}). There were 702 housing units at an average density of 10.7 per square mile (4.1/km^{2}). The racial makeup of the town was 97.51% White, 0.11% African American, 0.65% Native American, 0.87% Asian, 0.11% from other races, and 0.76% from two or more races. Hispanic or Latino people of any race were 0.32% of the population.

There were 384 households, out of which 27.1% had children under the age of 18 living with them, 53.4% were married couples living together, 7.8% had a female householder with no husband present, and 36.7% were non-families. 28.9% of all households were made up of individuals, and 8.6% had someone living alone who was 65 years of age or older. The average household size was 2.23 and the average family size was 2.76.

In the town, the population was spread out, with 20.0% under the age of 18, 4.5% from 18 to 24, 21.9% from 25 to 44, 33.1% from 45 to 64, and 20.5% who were 65 years of age or older. The median age was 47 years. For every 100 females, there were 88.6 males. For every 100 females age 18 and over, there were 82.5 males.

The median income for a household in the town was $40,114, and the median income for a family was $46,979. Males had a median income of $29,500 versus $24,000 for females. The per capita income for the town was $20,351. About 7.8% of families and 8.9% of the population were below the poverty line, including 10.1% of those under age 18 and 4.9% of those age 65 or over.

== Sites of interest ==
- The Frost Place, former home of poet Robert Frost
- New England Ski Museum
- Franconia Notch State Park & Cannon Mt Aerial Tramway
- Bridal Veil Falls
- Profile House
- Franconia Iron Works

== Notable people ==
- Elisabeth Elliot (1926–2015), Christian author, speaker
- Jessica Garretson Finch (1871–1949), suffragette, founder of Finch College
- Robert Frost (1874–1963), four time Pulitzer Prize-winning poet
- Sel Hannah (1913–1991), skier, ski area architect
- Bode Miller (born 1977), Olympic gold medalist skier
- Ernest Poole (1880–1950), author
- Annie Trumbull Slosson (1838–1926), author, entomologist
