= Polly's Pancake Parlor =

Restaurant in New Hampshire, United States

Coordinates: 44°13′15″N 71°46′30″W

Polly's Pancake Parlor is a restaurant and gift shop in Sugar Hill, New Hampshire, United States. Polly's has been featured in regional and national publications, garnering "glowing reviews" in Road Food, Every Day with Rachael Ray, Cooking with Paula Deen, the Food Network Magazine, New Hampshire Magazine, and Yankee magazine.

== History ==
Originally built about 1830, Polly's Pancake Parlor was a carriage shed, later used to store firewood. Polly and Wilfred (Sugar Bill) Dexter turned the shed into a small tea room in the 1930s. In 1938, to promote their maple products, they began offering pancakes, waffles, and French toast - "All you can eat for 50¢." Their daughter Nancy and son-in-law Roger Aldrich took over management in 1949. During the 1960s, they expanded to the point that they were open six months a year (they serve about 50,000 people per season), not three, and the dining room is now three times the original size. Nancy and Roger's daughter Kathie and her husband Dennis Cote are involved full-time in management.

== Awards and honors ==
- 2006, James Beard Foundation Award American Classics
- Best pancakes in New Hampshire
