= Kinsman Range =

Mountain range in New Hampshire, United States

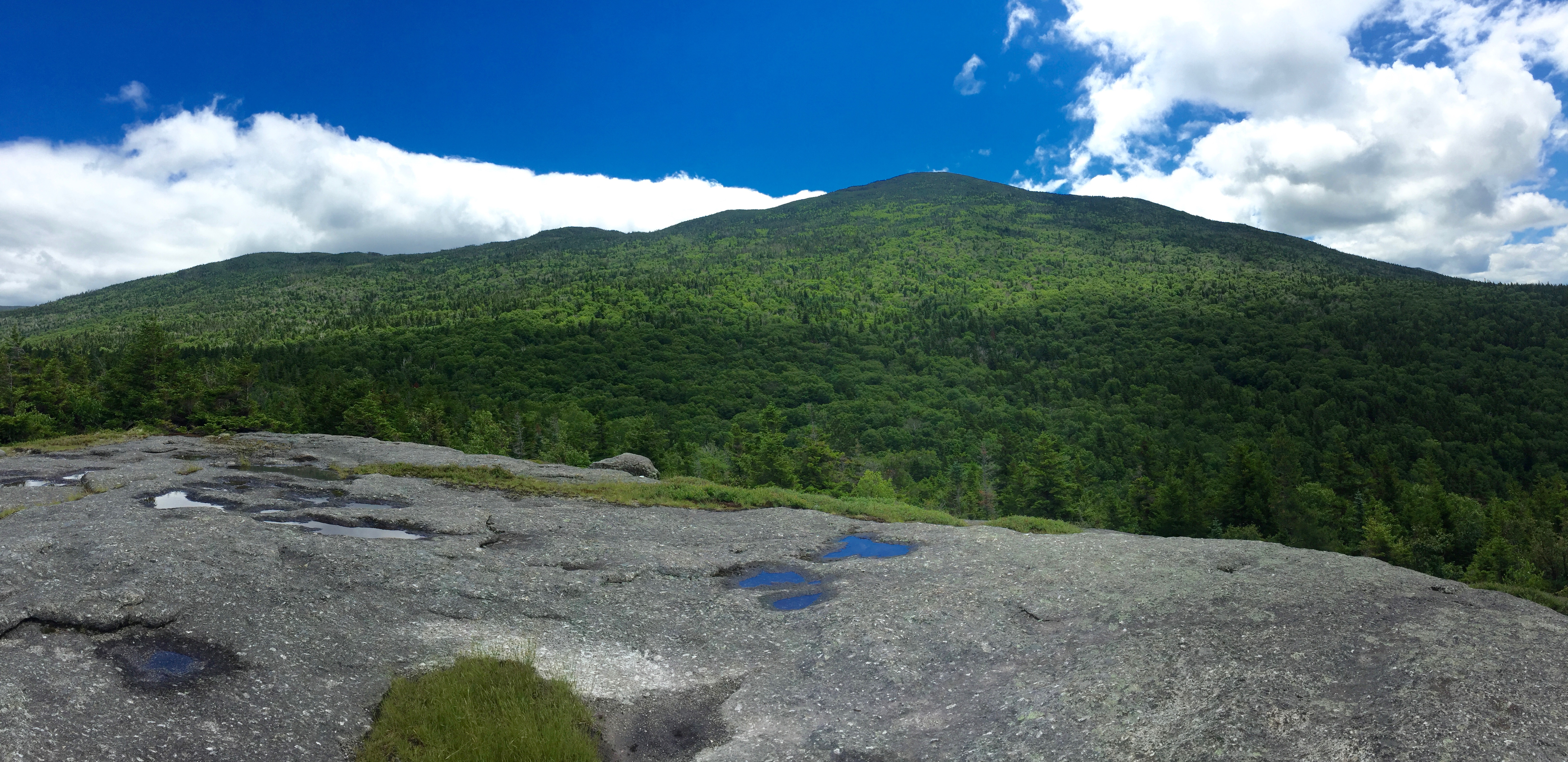
- Kinsman Mountain from Bald Peak on the west

Highest point
- Peak: Kinsman Mountain
- Elevation: 4,358 ft (1,328 m)
- Coordinates: 44°7′23″N 71°44′12″W

Geography
- Country: United States
- State: New Hampshire
- Parent range: White Mountains, Appalachian Mountains

The Kinsman Range, also known as the Cannon–Kinsman Range, is a north–south range in the White Mountains of New Hampshire in the United States. Its highest point is 4,358-foot-high (1,328 m) Kinsman Mountain, followed by the 4,293-foot (1,309 m) North Peak of Kinsman, and 4,080-foot (1,240 m) Cannon Mountain, one of the richest in rock climbing routes in the Whites. All are official "Four-thousand footers". 3,478-foot (1,060 m) Mount Wolf is on the crest of the range south of Kinsman Mountain. Rounding out the range are 2,470-foot (750 m) Bald Peak on the west side of Kinsman Mountain and 2,530-foot (770 m) Mount Pemigewasset on the east side, overlooking Franconia Notch.

To the northeast, the range is connected by The Cannon Balls ridge to Cannon Mountain. The southwest end of the range is at Kinsman Notch, a 1,870-foot (570 m) mountain pass and westernmost of the White Mountains' four major notches. The 16.9-mile-long (27.2 km) Kinsman Ridge Trail traverses the entire range from Kinsman Notch to the north base of Cannon Mountain in Franconia Notch. The Appalachian Trail follows the Kinsman Ridge Trail from Kinsman Notch to just north of the North Peak of Kinsman, where it turns east to Lonesome Lake before descending into the southern end of Franconia Notch.

The range is in Grafton County, near the town of Lincoln. Its west side drains into Long Island Sound via the Gale River, Ammonoosuc River, and Connecticut River, the east into the Gulf of Maine via the Pemigewasset River and Merrimack River.

== See also ==
- List of mountains of New Hampshire
- White Mountain National Forest
