= Sugar Hill, New Hampshire =

- Town
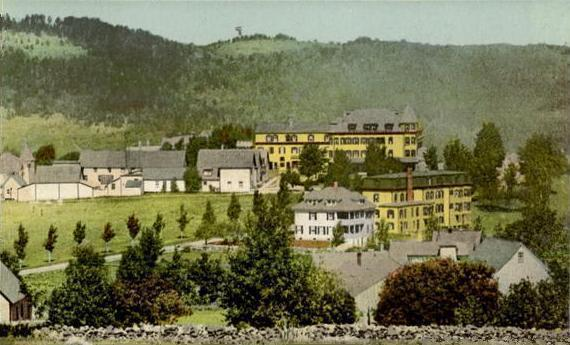
- The Sunset Hill House, Sugar Hill, c. 1910

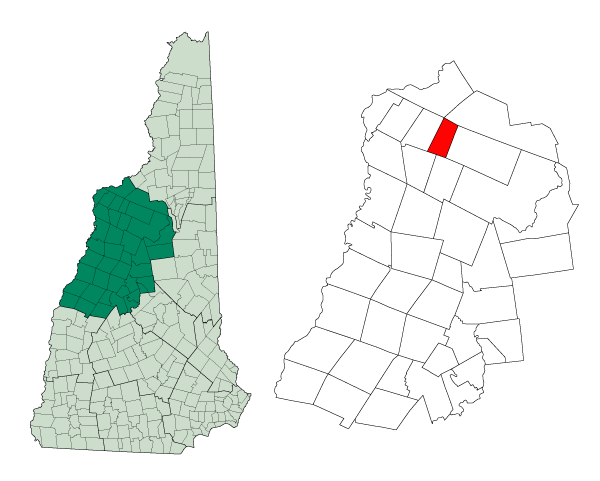
- Location in Grafton County, New Hampshire !-- Location -->
- Coordinates: 44°13′18″N 71°47′43″W
- Country: United States
- State: New Hampshire
- County: Grafton
- Incorporated: 16 July 1962

Area
  - Total: 17.23 sq mi (44.63 km^{2})
  - Land: 17.05 sq mi (44.16 km^{2})
  - Water: 0.18 sq mi (0.47 km^{2}) 1.06%
- Elevation: 1,280 ft (390 m)

Population (2020)
  - Total: 647
  - Density: 38/sq mi (14.7/km^{2})
- Time zone: UTC-5 (Eastern)
  - Summer (DST): UTC-4 (Eastern)
- ZIP code: 03586
- Area code: 603
- FIPS code: 33-74740
- GNIS feature ID: 873730
- Website: www.sugarhillnh.org

Sugar Hill is a town in Grafton County, New Hampshire, United States. The population was 647 at the 2020 census, an increase over the figure of 563 tabulated in 2010. The town overlooks the White Mountain National Forest, with views of the Presidential, Franconia, Kinsman and Dalton ranges. Sugar Hill was incorporated as a town in 1962, the most recent in New Hampshire.

== History ==
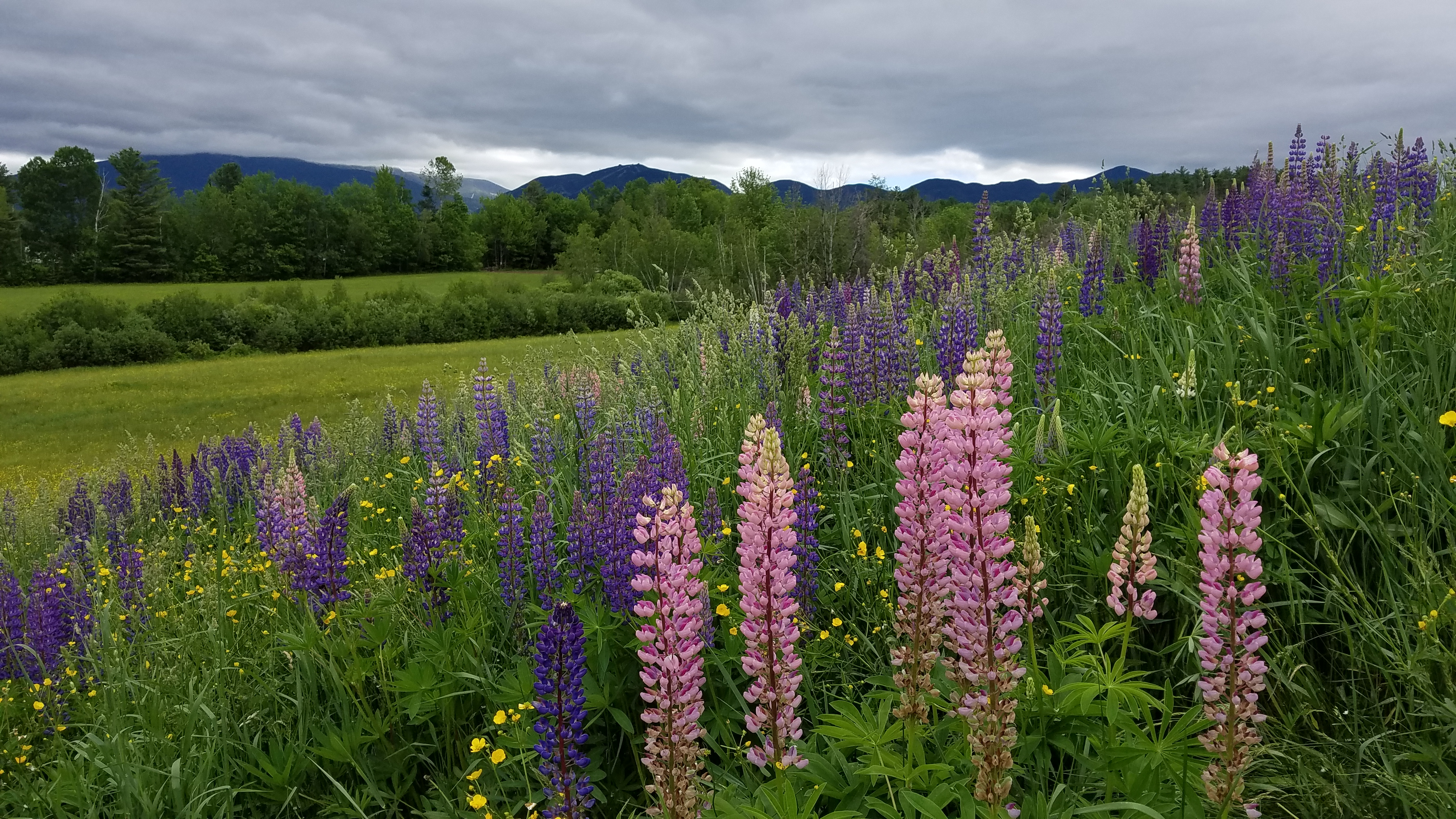
Sugar Hill is known for its lupine blooms every June.

Incorporated in 1962 out of the town of Lisbon after considerable litigation, Sugar Hill is the most recently incorporated town in the state. The name "Sugar Hill" comes from the large groves of sugar maples within the town limits.

Offering clean air and panoramic views from atop Sunset Hill Ridge of both the White Mountains and Green Mountains, the community became a fashionable Victorian resort. First attracted by paintings of White Mountain artists, the wealthy arrived by train to escape the heat, humidity and pollution of summers in Boston, Hartford, New York and Philadelphia. Several hostelries were built, including the Hotel Lookoff. But the grandest was the Sunset Hill House, built in 1880 after rail service arrived in neighboring Lisbon Village (Sunset Hill Station). With the longest porch on a single side in New Hampshire, the Second Empire hotel accommodated 350 guests and 300 staff. Patrons found amusement in the casino and bowling alley, or on carriage rides touring nearby Franconia Notch. Built in 1897, the 9-hole Sugar Hill House Golf Course, together with its 1900 clubhouse, are the oldest in the state and are listed on the National Register of Historic Places. Bobby Jones played the links.

With the advent of automobiles came a decline in grand hotels, however, as tourists were no longer restricted by the limits of rail service. The Sunset Hill House remained open until 1973, longer than many of its type in the region. But it closed at season's end, when the furnishings were sold at auction. The aging structure was demolished in 1974, although its annex survived and was purchased in 2013 by new owners, to reopen in 2015 as "The Inn at Sunset Hill".

=== Peckett's-on-Sugar Hill ===
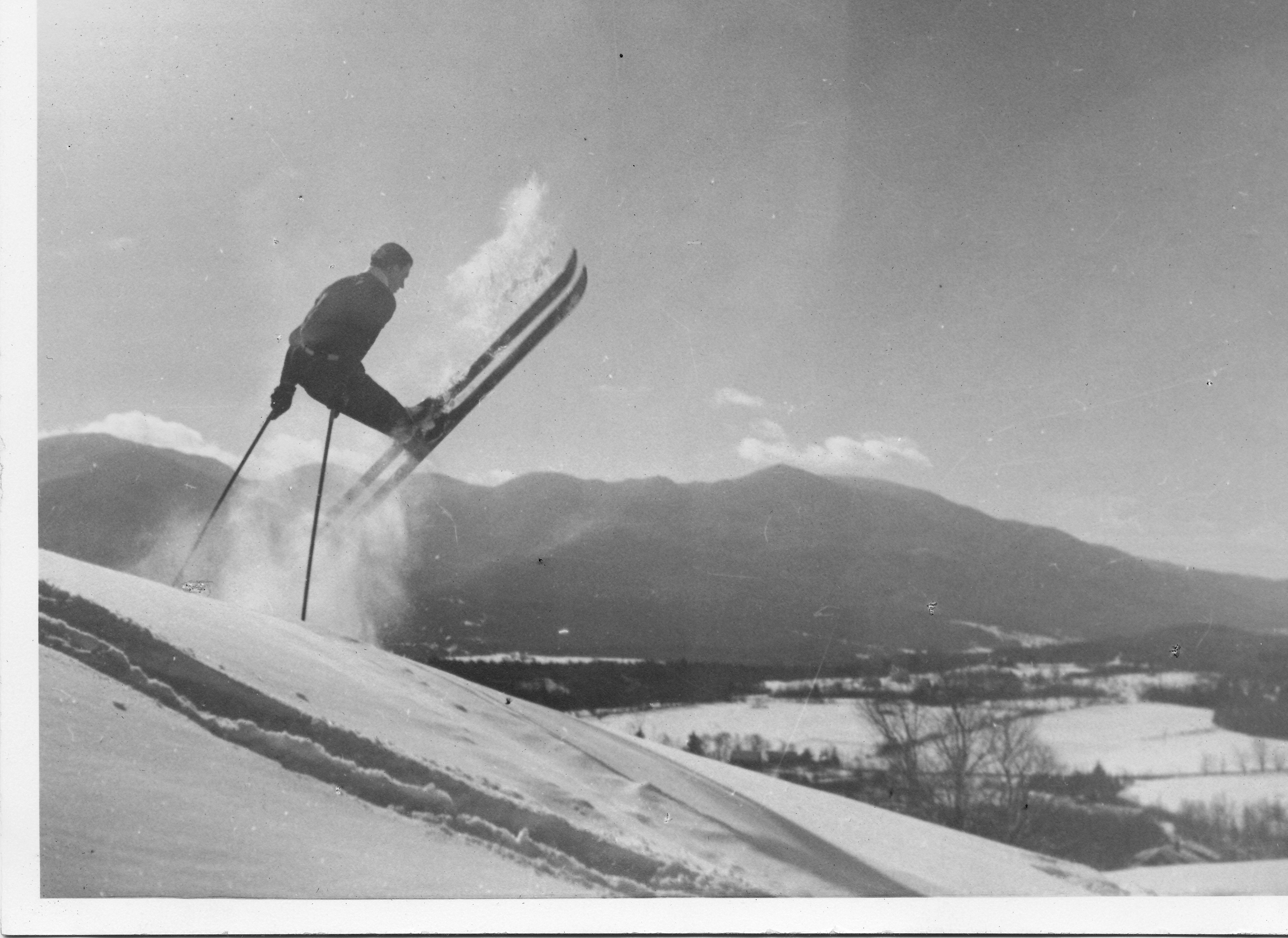
Otto Lang, ski instructor, on slope near Peckett's Inn – 1936

Robert P. Peckett Sr. acquired land on Sugar Hill around 1900 and founded the Peckett's-on-Sugar Hill Inn. While hosting winter guests early in the century, the need for increased clientele prompted him, with the assistance of his wife, Katharine Peckett, to establish the first resort-based ski school in the United States. The first two ski instructors were German; they introduced the Arlberg technique developed by Hannes Schneider at St. Anton. In 1931, Sig Buchmayr joined the staff. Kate Peckett brought in several more European instructors including Otto Lang to teach the Arlberg system. Among pupils were Nelson Rockefeller, Averell Harriman, Lowell Thomas, Minot Dole and Roger Peabody. Subsequent efforts by Kate, the CCC and others resulted in the development of the Taft Ski Trail and other facilities on the Cannon Mountain Ski Area.

=== Image gallery ===
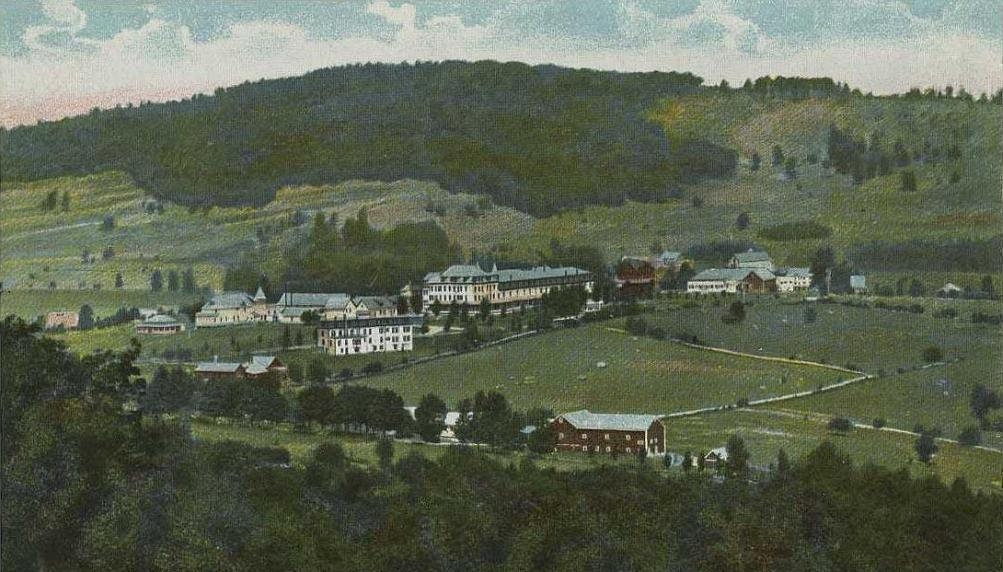
Sunset Hill House c. 1906

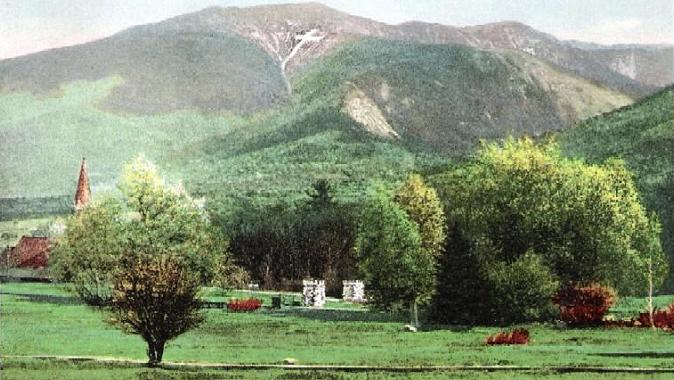
Mount Lafayette from Sugar Hill in 1913

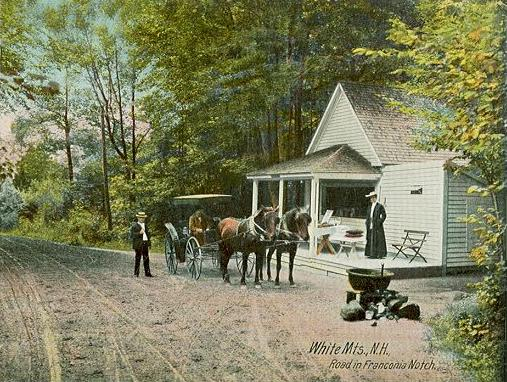
Carriage ride c. 1905

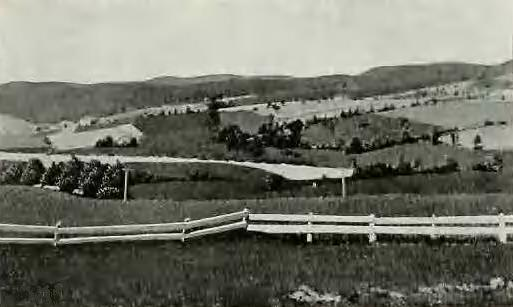
Green Mountains from Sugar Hill c. 1920

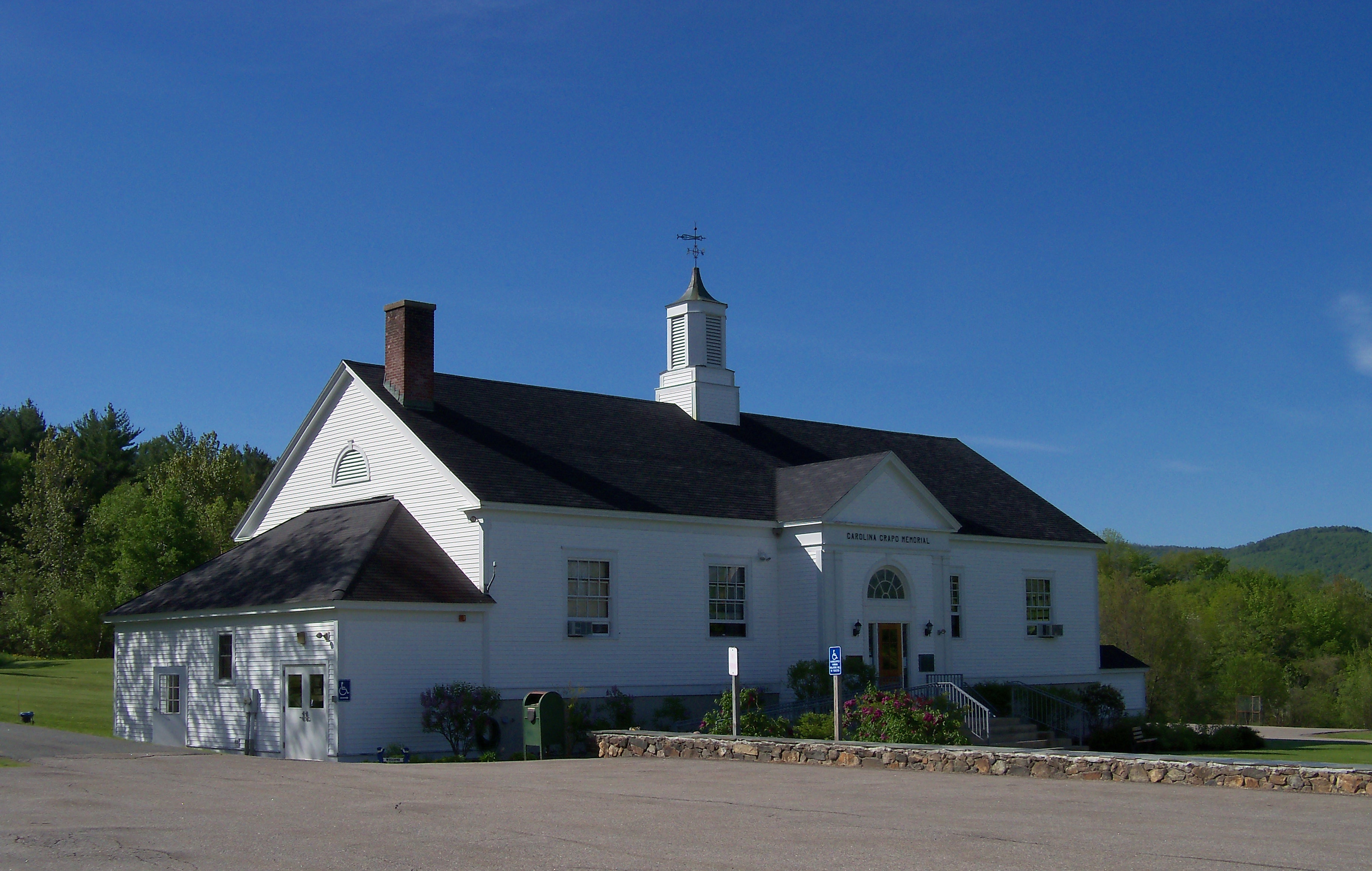
Town hall

== Geography ==
According to the United States Census Bureau, the town has a total area of 17.2 square miles (44.6 km^{2}), of which 17.1 square miles (44.2 km^{2}) are land and 0.2 square miles (0.5 km^{2}) are water, comprising 1.06% of the town. Sugar Hill is drained by the Gale River and other tributaries of the Ammonoosuc River, part of the Connecticut River watershed. The town is crossed by New Hampshire Route 117. Interstate 93 and New Hampshire Route 18 pass through the northeastern corner of the town. The highest point in Sugar Hill is the summit of Bronson Hill, at 2,078 feet (633 m) above sea level, in the southwestern corner of the town.

== Demographics ==
Historical population
Census	Pop.	Note	%±
1970	336		—
1980	397		18.2%
1990	464		16.9%
2000	563		21.3%
2010	563		0.0%
2020	647		14.9%
U.S. Decennial Census

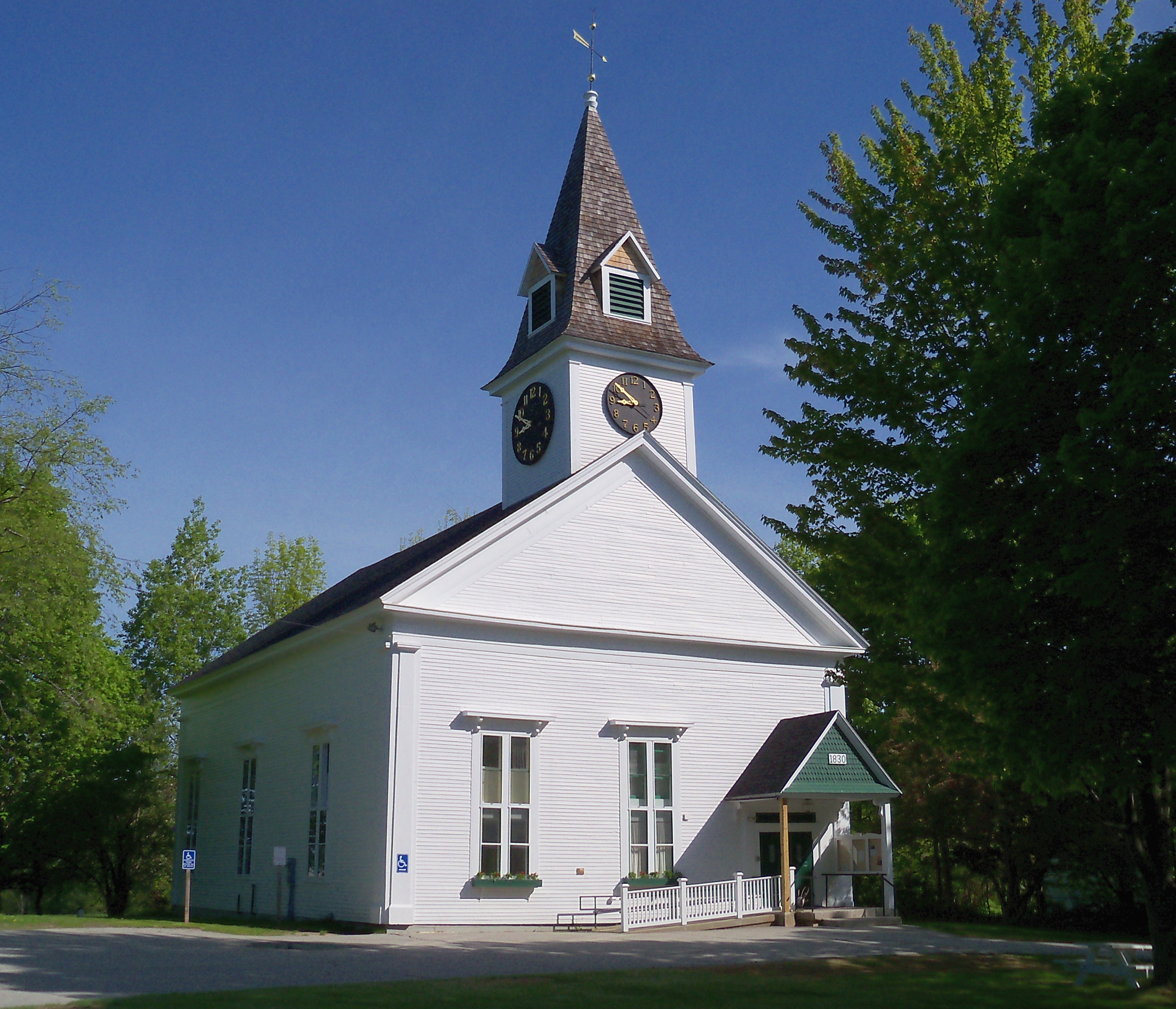
Sugar Hill Meetinghouse, listed on the New Hampshire State Register of Historic Places

As of the census of 2000, there were 563 people, 258 households, and 164 families residing in the town. The population density was 32.9 inhabitants per square mile (12.7/km^{2}). There were 385 housing units at an average density of 22.5 per square mile (8.7/km^{2}). The racial makeup of the town was 98.40% White, 1.24% Asian, and 0.36% from two or more races. Hispanic or Latino of any race were 0.18% of the population.

There were 258 households, out of which 22.1% had children under the age of 18 living with them, 56.2% were married couples living together, 4.7% had a female householder with no husband present, and 36.4% were non-families. 29.8% of all households were made up of individuals, and 12.0% had someone living alone who was 65 years of age or older. The average household size was 2.18 and the average family size was 2.72.

In the town, the population was spread out, with 18.1% under the age of 18, 5.3% from 18 to 24, 24.2% from 25 to 44, 33.7% from 45 to 64, and 18.7% who were 65 years of age or older. The median age was 46 years. For every 100 females, there were 98.9 males. For every 100 females age 18 and over, there were 101.3 males.

The median income for a household in the town was $49,219, and the median income for a family was $60,288. Males had a median income of $36,667 versus $25,714 for females. The per capita income for the town was $29,743. About 4.3% of families and 5.3% of the population were below the poverty line, including none of those under age 18 and 10.6% of those age 65 or over.

== Notable people ==
- Bette Davis (1908–1989), actress (summer visitor)
- Ernest Poole (1880–1950), novelist
- Potter Stewart (1915–1985), Associate Justice of the United States Supreme Court
- Harlan Fiske Stone (1872–1946), Chief Justice of the United States
- William C. Sullivan (1912–1977), FBI agent, killed in a hunting accident on November 9, 1977, in Sugar Hill
- Mary Parker Woodworth (1849–1919), writer, speaker

== Sites of interest ==
- New Hampshire Historical Marker No. 73: First Ski School in America
- Polly's Pancake Parlor, a James Beard Foundation American Classic
