= South Branch Gale River =

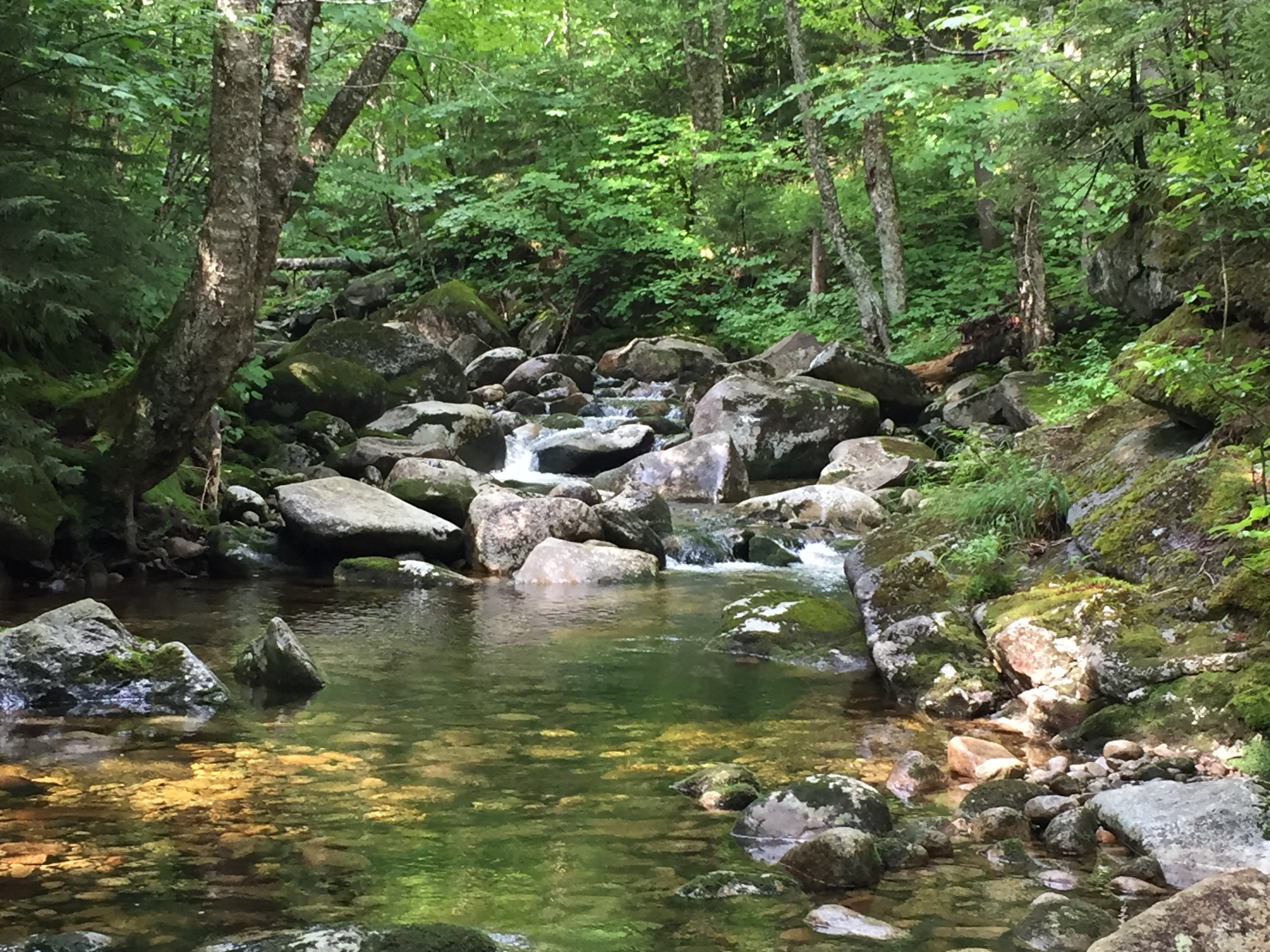
- The South Branch, south of the Gale River Loop Road

- Location within New Hampshire Location within the United States

Location
- Country: United States
- State: New Hampshire
- County: Grafton
- Towns: Franconia, Bethlehem

Physical characteristics
- Source: Mount Lafayette
  - location: Franconia
  - coordinates: 44°10′32″N 71°38′54″W
  - elevation: 3,640 ft (1,110 m)
- Mouth: Gale River
  - location: Bethlehem
  - coordinates: 44°14′37″N 71°38′17″W
  - elevation: 1,310 ft (400 m)
- Length: 5.1 mi (8.2 km)

Basin features
- Tributaries
  - left: Scarface Brook
  - right: Burnt Brook, Thompson Brook

The South Branch of the Gale River is a 5.1-mile-long (8.2 km) river in the White Mountains of New Hampshire in the United States. Via the Gale River, it is a tributary of the Ammonoosuc River and part of the Connecticut River watershed.

The South Branch rises on the north slope of Mount Lafayette in the town of Franconia, New Hampshire, west of Garfield Ridge. It drops rapidly to the north and joins the North Branch to form the Gale River at the crossing of U.S. Route 3. The South Branch provides drinking water for the town of Bethlehem, New Hampshire.

== See also ==
- List of rivers of New Hampshire
