= High Huts of the White Mountains =

Mountain huts in New Hampshire

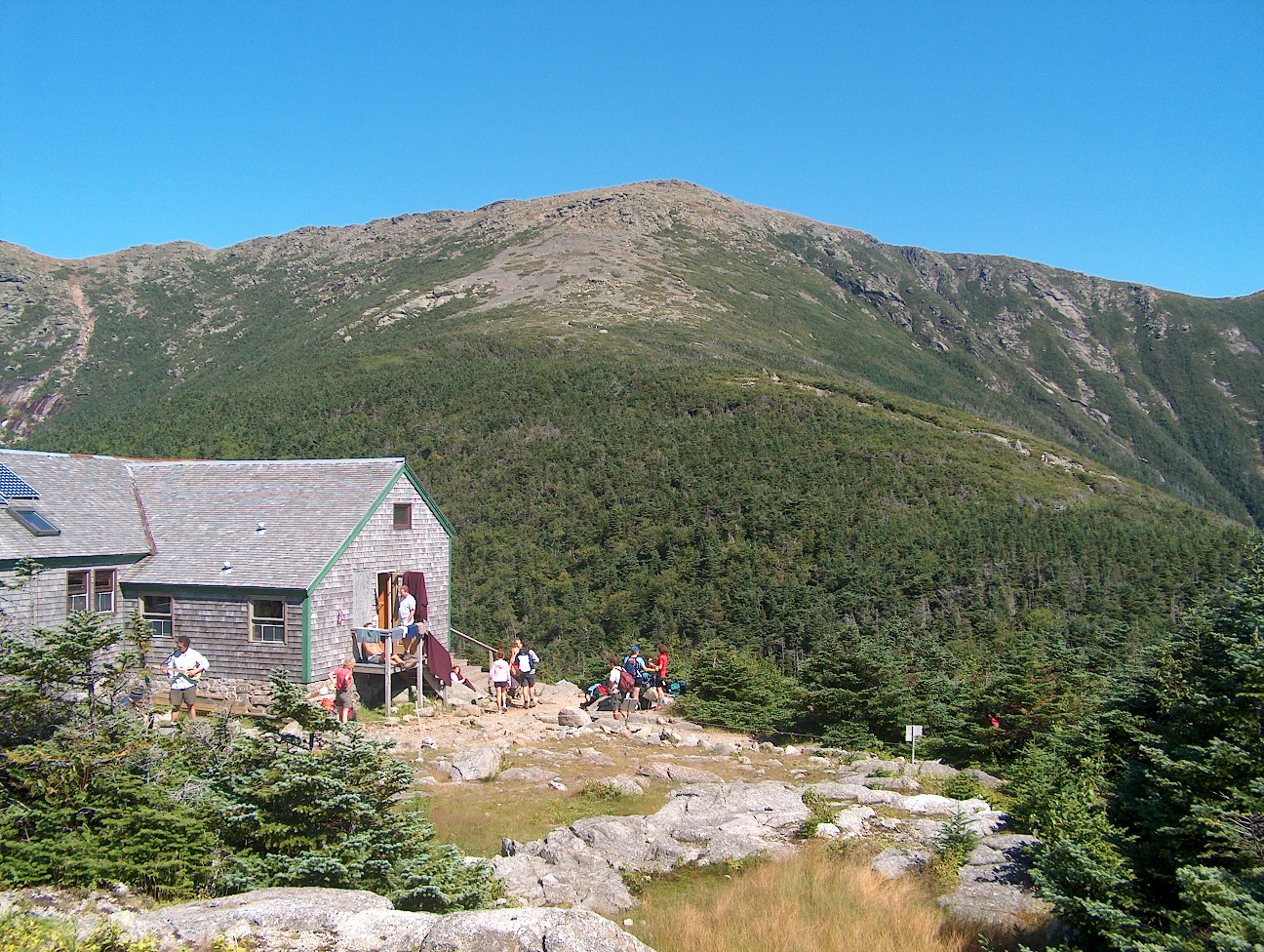
Greenleaf Hut on the shoulder of Mount Lafayette

The High Huts of the White Mountains are eight mountain huts in the White Mountains of New Hampshire, operated and maintained by the Appalachian Mountain Club (AMC) under a 30-year special-use permit from the U.S. Forest Service (USFS). The first hut was built in 1888 while the most recent was completed in 1964. Like the huts in the Alps, they offer food and lodging to guests. Because of the special-use permit and the non-profit nature of the AMC, they also provide information services, drinking water, and food to the public, as well as support for research and emergency services. Five of the eight huts are located directly on the Appalachian Trail (AT), although all are can be reached from the AT. In general, they are separated by six to eight miles (9.7 to 12.9 km).

Hikers can reserve overnight bunks at the huts, which hold from 36 to 96 people each. They offer full service from June through late-October, serving dinner and breakfast. Three huts stay open the rest of the year as self service, allowing guests to cook their own food in the kitchen.

The huts are staffed by a team of four to ten caretakers—often called "the croo"—during full-service season. Each crew member works eleven days on, three days off. During the eleven working days, they must make four trips back down the mountain to get food and other supplies, carrying heavy loads. At the beginning of each season, fuel and supplies are flown into the huts by helicopter. The huts were built and are maintained by the Appalachian Mountain Club's construction crew.

The huts have handled thousands of hikers entering the back woods and environmentally sensitive areas above tree line. Four years and an environmental impact statement were required to get the huts' permits renewed by the U.S. Forest Service in 1999.

The winter huts closed in March 2020 and the other huts did not open for the summer 2020 season due to the COVID-19 pandemic. This was the first time that all huts have been closed at once. The huts re-opened on June 26, 2020, for daytime visits only, and fully re-opened for the 2021 season.

== Hut history ==
The following High Huts are presented in the order they would be reached when hiking the Appalachian Trail from south to north.

=== Lonesome Lake ===
Lonesome Lake Hut (44°08′19″N 71°42′12″W) is the second lowest hut in the system. It started out in 1876 as a fishing camp on Lonesome Lake, with cabins built by author W.C. Prime. The hut officially became part of the AMC system in 1929, when the State of New Hampshire bought the land and invited the club to run it as a shelter.

=== Greenleaf ===
Greenleaf Hut (44°09′37″N 71°39′37″W) lies on a prominent shoulder of Mount Lafayette, with views of Franconia Ridge. Its construction was the first to leave behind the stone and masonry construction technique utilized by earlier huts, and to use a team of mules to carry materials. It was completed in 1930 and pioneered running water and indoor toilets, reflecting an evolution of AMC huts from simple shelters towards becoming more like mountainside hostels. Much of Greenleaf's construction funding came from Colonel Charles Greenleaf, for whom it is named. It features a central dining room and kitchen flanked by two bunkrooms, a design which became the model for Galehead and Zealand Falls huts, both constructed within the next year. It is 4,220 feet (1,290 m) above sea level. This is the only one of the huts not located directly on the Appalachian Trail. From the AT at the summit of Mt. Lafayette, one must travel 1.1 miles down the west shoulder of the mountain on the Greenleaf Trail to reach the hut.

=== Galehead ===
Galehead Hut (44°11′16″N 71°34′08″W) lies nearly 3,800 feet (1,200 m) above sea level on rugged Garfield Ridge. Construction on the original structure there began in 1931, using wood from the surrounding trees. It was completed in 1932, along with Zealand Falls Hut, its closest northern neighbor. A small space under the front porch was used to store perishable foods. In 1938, Galehead gained a temporary 360 degree view when the Great New England Hurricane blew over all the surrounding trees. It was replaced in June 2000 with a new Americans with Disabilities Act-compliant hut, complete with a wheelchair ramp even though it is 5 miles (8 km) of rough trail from the nearest trailhead. Given its altitude and remoteness, the vast majority of the new structure's materials had to be carried in; thus mainly lightweight materials were utilized. New features include composting toilets (already in use at Mizpah Spring Hut, Carter Notch Hut, and Lonesome Lake Hut), both solar panels and a wind vane for producing power, and a foundation fastened to the granite bedrock with grouted rebar, giving the hut the ability to withstand winds up to 125 miles per hour (200 km/h). The hut is 0.9 miles (1.4 km) from the summit of South Twin Mountain and 0.5 miles (800 m) from the summit of Galehead Mountain.

=== Zealand Falls ===
Zealand Falls Hut (44°11′46″N 71°29′40″W) was completed in 1932 along with Galehead and has been open in the winter season since 1973. It, like Lonesome Lake hut, is notable as a "family" hut due to its low altitude and relatively easy approach climb. It also has the lowest capacity of all the huts, sleeping little more than a third of the largest capacity hut.

=== Mizpah Spring ===
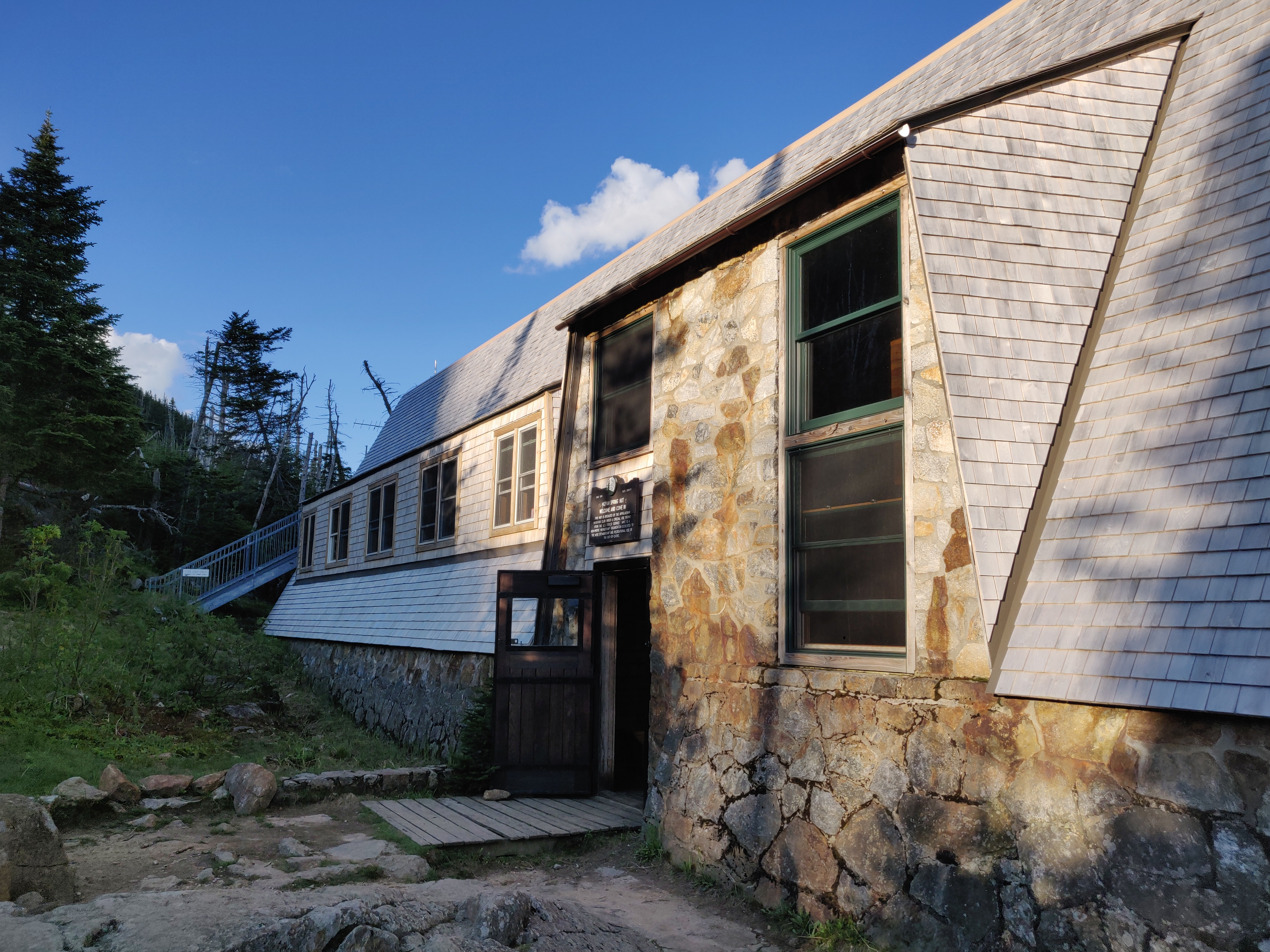
Mizpah Spring Hut

Mizpah Spring Hut (44°13′09″N 71°22′10″W) was originally built in 1964, and although there are newer buildings in the system, this makes Mizpah the newest hut site in the system. The building is designed to withstand 200 miles per hour (320 km/h) winds and was built with materials brought in by helicopter.

=== Lakes of the Clouds ===
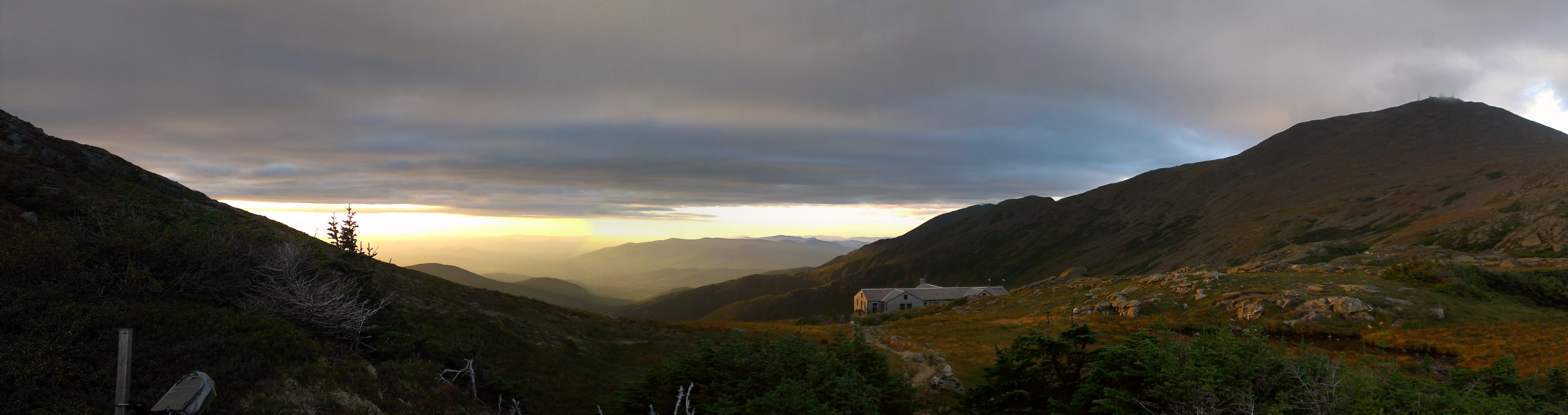
Lakes of the Clouds Hut at sunset

Lakes of the Clouds Hut (44°15′32″N 71°19′08″W) is the highest and largest hut in the system. It was built as a shelter in 1901 in response to the deaths of two hikers the previous year who were caught in a storm on their way to an AMC meeting atop Mount Washington. It was rebuilt as a hut in 1915, and was renovated in 1922, 1927, 1947, 1969, and 2005. Although it is the highest of the huts, at an elevation of 5,030 feet (1,533 m), it is the most easily accessible due to its proximity to the summit of Mount Washington, which can be reached by car and by the Mount Washington Cog Railway. It is located adjacent to its namesake Lakes of the Clouds, two small alpine tarns, and just below the 5,372 ft (1,637 m) summit of Mount Monroe. The hut provides bunks for 90 hikers. It is sometimes called "Lakes of the Crowds" due to its size and popularity.

=== Madison Spring ===
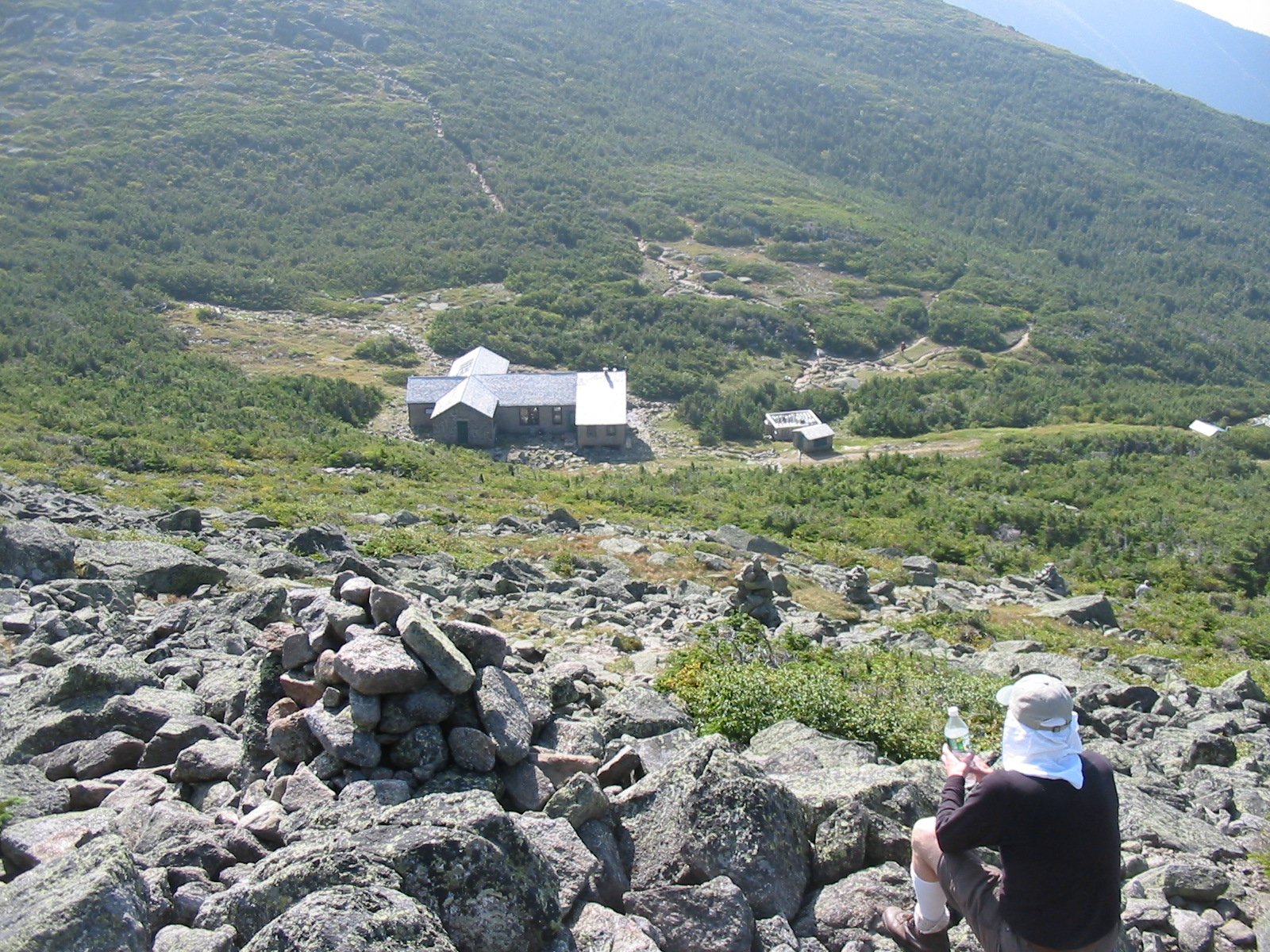
Madison Spring Hut

Madison Spring Hut (44°19′40″N 71°17′00″W), originally built in 1888, is the oldest hut site in the United States. The first overnight guests stayed in the winter of 1889, and in 1906 a fee of 50 cents per night was instituted to utilize the shelter. The original hut was expanded in that same year, as well as 1911, 1922, and 1929. However, in 1940, a fire—caused by the ignition of gasoline for the gasoline-electric power generator—destroyed much of the hut. The following year it was rebuilt and re-opened. The hut was extensively rehabilitated in the fall of 2010 and early 2011.

At 4,810 feet (1,466 m) above sea level, it is the second highest hut in the chain, and it sleeps the third highest number of guests. The hut is accessed most directly from the Valley Way trail (from the Appalachia parking lot). It is generally considered the most difficult of the full-service huts to access, based on distance and elevation required to reach it.

=== Carter Notch ===
Carter Notch Hut (44°15′33″N 71°11′44″W) is the easternmost hut in the system and is open year-round. Between 1996 and 2006, it operated on a self-service basis; since then it has resumed operating as a full-service hut during the summer season, remaining self-service the rest of the year. The site's use as a shelter began in 1904 as a simple log cabin; the building was rebuilt as a hut in 1914, making Carter Notch the oldest building in the hut chain, supposedly by Milton McGregor, aka "Red Mac". There are two bunkhouses located a short distance from the main hut structure; thus from the cliffs above, the hut is viewed as a small compound. There are two small ponds located nearby, as well as a tremendous boulder field. Carter Notch helped establish the hut as a viable pursuit for the AMC, and after its initial success, the group began to lay plans for a hut system.

== Table ==
Hut	Location	Elevation	Capacity	Sleeping arrangement
Carter Notch Hut	Carter Notch	3,288 feet	40	Two bunkhouses with coed rooms for four to six people
Galehead Hut	Edge of Pemigewasset Wilderness Area	3,800 feet	38	Four coed bunkrooms
Greenleaf Hut	Mount Lafayette	4,200 feet	48	Two coed bunkrooms
Lakes of the Clouds Hut	Col between Mt. Monroe and Mount Washington	5,030 feet	96	Coed bunkrooms
Lonesome Lake Hut	Cannon Mountain	2,760 feet	48	Two bunkhouses with coed rooms for four to six people
Madison Spring Hut	Col between Mount Madison and Mount Adams	4,800 feet	52	Two coed bunkrooms
Mizpah Spring Hut	Mount Pierce (formerly but sometimes still called Mount Clinton)	3,800 feet	60	Coed bunkrooms for four to eight people
Zealand Falls Hut	Zealand Notch	2,637 feet	36	Two coed bunkrooms
