= Ham Branch =

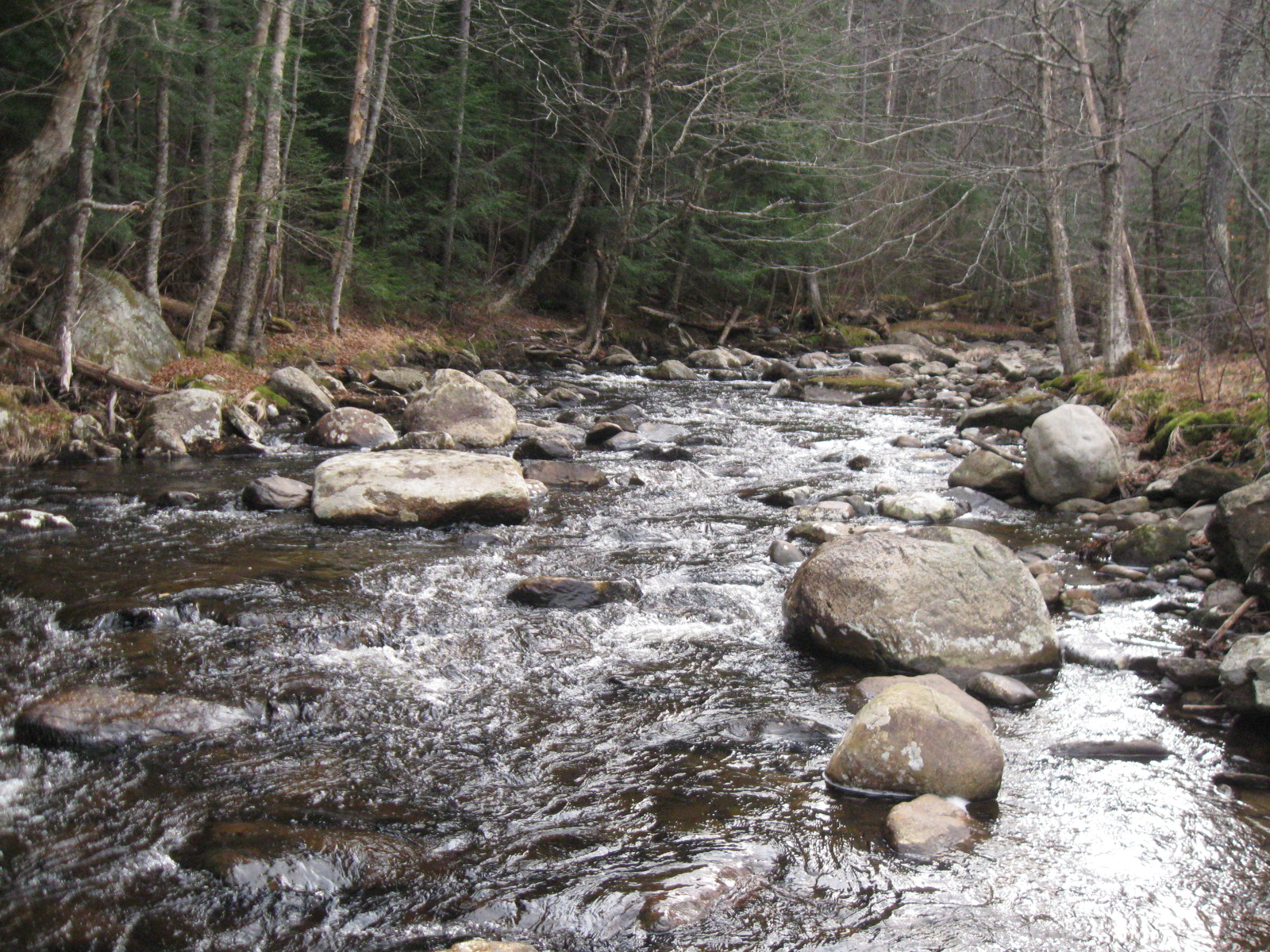
- The Ham Branch near the town center in Easton, New Hampshire

- Location within New Hampshire Location within the United States

Location
- Country: United States
- State: New Hampshire
- County: Grafton
- Towns: Easton, Franconia

Physical characteristics
- Source: White Mountain National Forest
  - location: Easton
  - coordinates: 44°6′10″N 71°47′10″W
  - elevation: 2,120 ft (650 m)
- Mouth: Gale River
  - location: Franconia
  - coordinates: 44°13′41″N 71°45′15″W
  - elevation: 915 ft (279 m)
- Length: 12.2 mi (19.6 km)

Basin features
- Tributaries
  - right: Reel Brook, Slide Brook, Judd Brook, Kendall Brook, Coppermine Brook

The Ham Branch of the Gale River is a 12.2-mile-long (19.6 km) river in northwestern New Hampshire in the United States. Via the Gale River, it is a tributary of the Ammonoosuc River and part of the Connecticut River watershed.

The Ham Branch rises in the town of Easton and flows north through a valley at the western base of the Kinsman Range of the White Mountains. The river collects such tributaries as Reel Brook, Slide Brook, and Coppermine Brook before joining the Gale River in the village of Franconia. New Hampshire Route 116 follows the Ham Branch for nearly its entire course.

== See also ==
- List of New Hampshire rivers
