= South Twin Mountain (New Hampshire) =

Mountain in the state of New Hampshire, United States

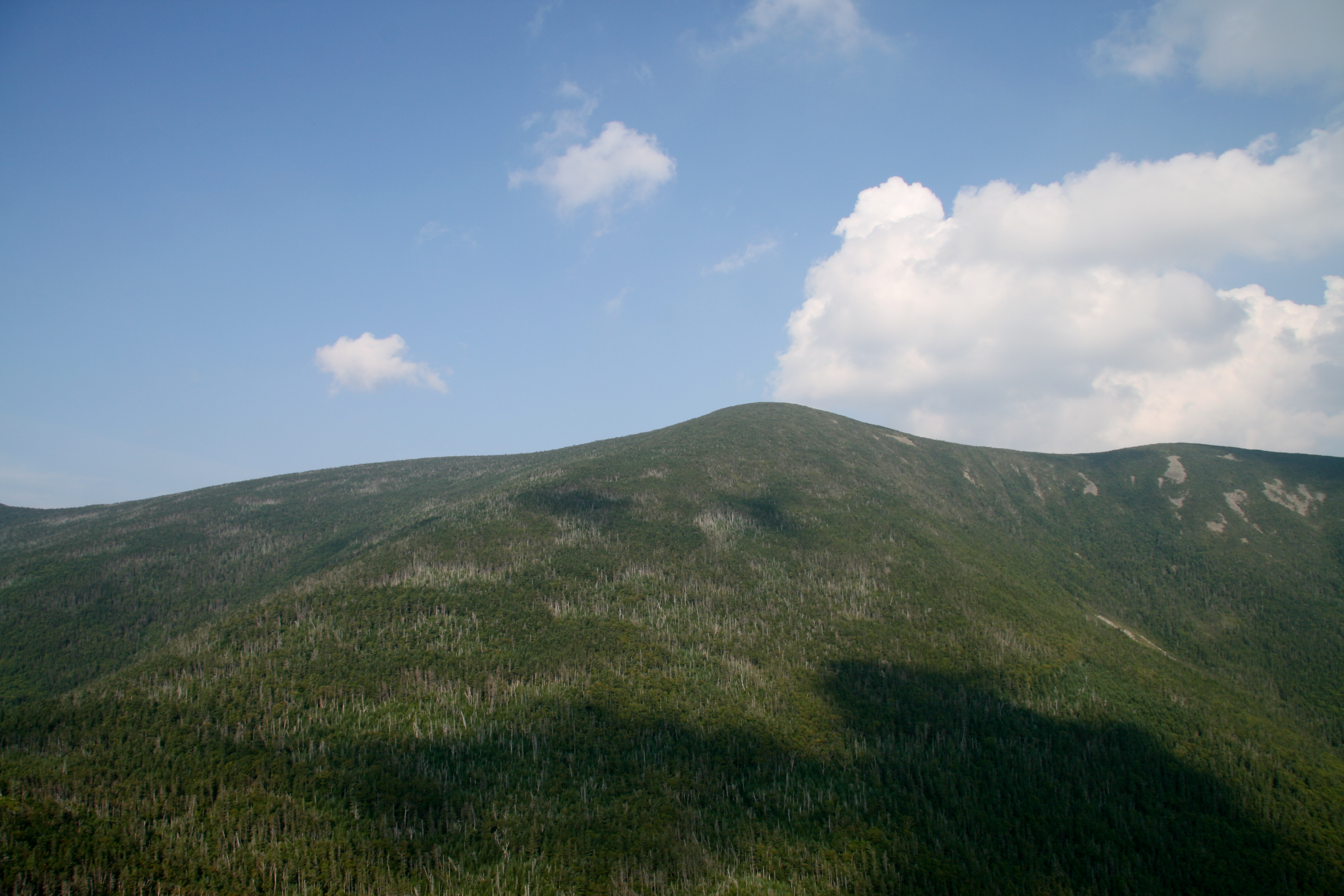
- South Twin from Galehead Mountain, taken August 2009

Highest point
- Elevation: 1,494 m (4,902 ft)
- Prominence: 464 m (1,522 ft)
- Listing: White Mountain 4000-Footers
- Coordinates: 44°11.25′N 71°33.32′W

Geography
- Location: Grafton County, New Hampshire, U.S.
- Parent range: Twin Range
- Topo map: USGS South Twin Mountain

South Twin Mountain is a mountain located in Grafton County, New Hampshire, United States. The mountain is part of the Twin Range of the White Mountains. South Twin forms the high point of a north–south ridge, with North Twin Mountain lying approximately one mile to the north and Mount Guyot two miles (3.2 km) to the southeast. Galehead Mountain, a lower spur of South Twin, is to the west.

The east face of South Twin drains into the Little River, thence into the Ammonoosuc and Connecticut Rivers, and into Long Island Sound in Connecticut. The northwest slopes of South Twin drain to the North Branch of the Gale River, another tributary of the Ammonoosuc River. Southwest of South Twin Mountain is the valley of Twin Brook, which flows into the Franconia Branch of the East Branch of the Pemigewasset River, through the Pemigewasset Wilderness, thence into the Pemigewasset and Merrimack Rivers, and into the Gulf of Maine in Massachusetts.

The summit of South Twin is open and rocky, but stands of spruce and fir trees grow in close proximity. The Appalachian Trail, a 2,170-mile (3,500-km) National Scenic Trail from Georgia to Maine, crosses the summit of South Twin, passing from Galehead Mountain (and Galehead Hut) to the west towards Mount Guyot to the southeast. The North Twin Trail proceeds north along the ridge crest to the summit of North Twin.

== Climate ==
Climate data for South Twin Mountain (NH) 44.1922 N, 71.5514 W, Elevation: 4,498 ft (1,371 m) (1991–2020 normals)
Month	Jan	Feb	Mar	Apr	May	Jun	Jul	Aug	Sep	Oct	Nov	Dec	Year
Mean daily maximum °F (°C)	18.2 (−7.7)	19.6 (−6.9)	26.6 (−3.0)	39.2 (4.0)	52.1 (11.2)	60.6 (15.9)	65.1 (18.4)	63.9 (17.7)	57.8 (14.3)	45.6 (7.6)	32.6 (0.3)	23.5 (−4.7)	42.1 (5.6)
Daily mean °F (°C)	10.3 (−12.1)	11.6 (−11.3)	18.7 (−7.4)	30.9 (−0.6)	43.9 (6.6)	53.0 (11.7)	57.7 (14.3)	56.5 (13.6)	50.2 (10.1)	38.3 (3.5)	26.2 (−3.2)	16.6 (−8.6)	34.5 (1.4)
Mean daily minimum °F (°C)	2.4 (−16.4)	3.5 (−15.8)	10.9 (−11.7)	22.5 (−5.3)	35.6 (2.0)	45.4 (7.4)	50.3 (10.2)	49.0 (9.4)	42.6 (5.9)	31.0 (−0.6)	19.9 (−6.7)	9.7 (−12.4)	26.9 (−2.8)
Average precipitation inches (mm)	5.93 (151)	4.62 (117)	6.03 (153)	6.58 (167)	7.04 (179)	9.55 (243)	7.26 (184)	7.11 (181)	6.41 (163)	8.52 (216)	7.67 (195)	7.10 (180)	83.82 (2,129)
Source: PRISM Climate Group

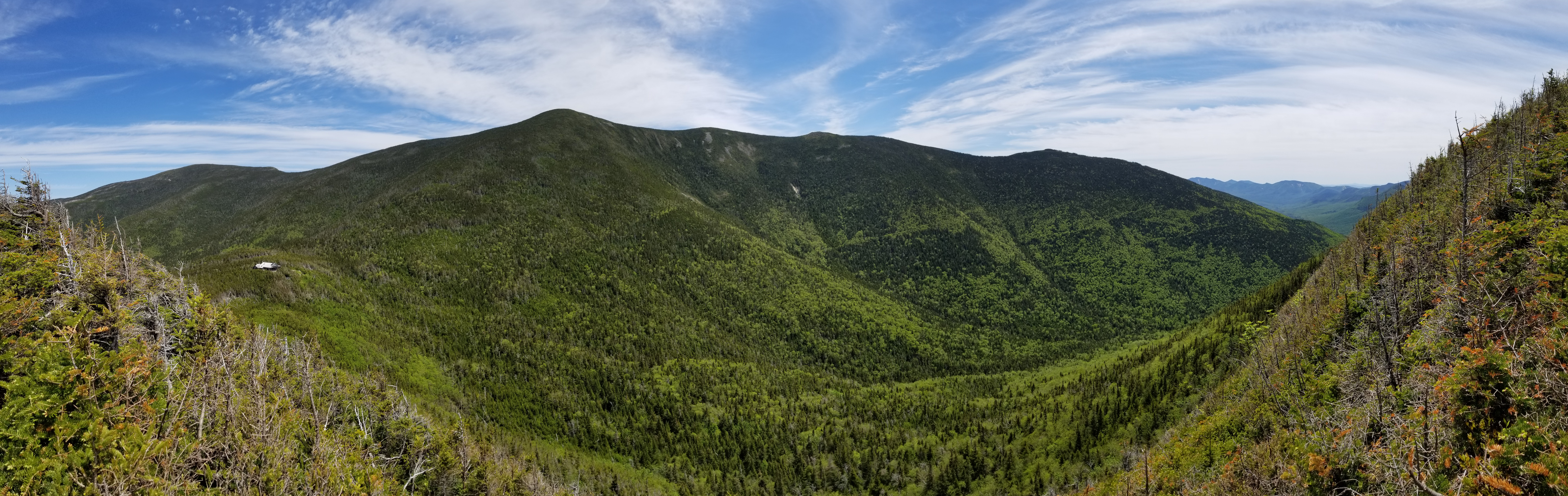
A photo of South Twin Mountain taken from Galehead Mountain. North Twin Mountain can be seen in the distance to the left.

== See also ==
- List of mountains in New Hampshire
- White Mountain National Forest
