= Gale River =

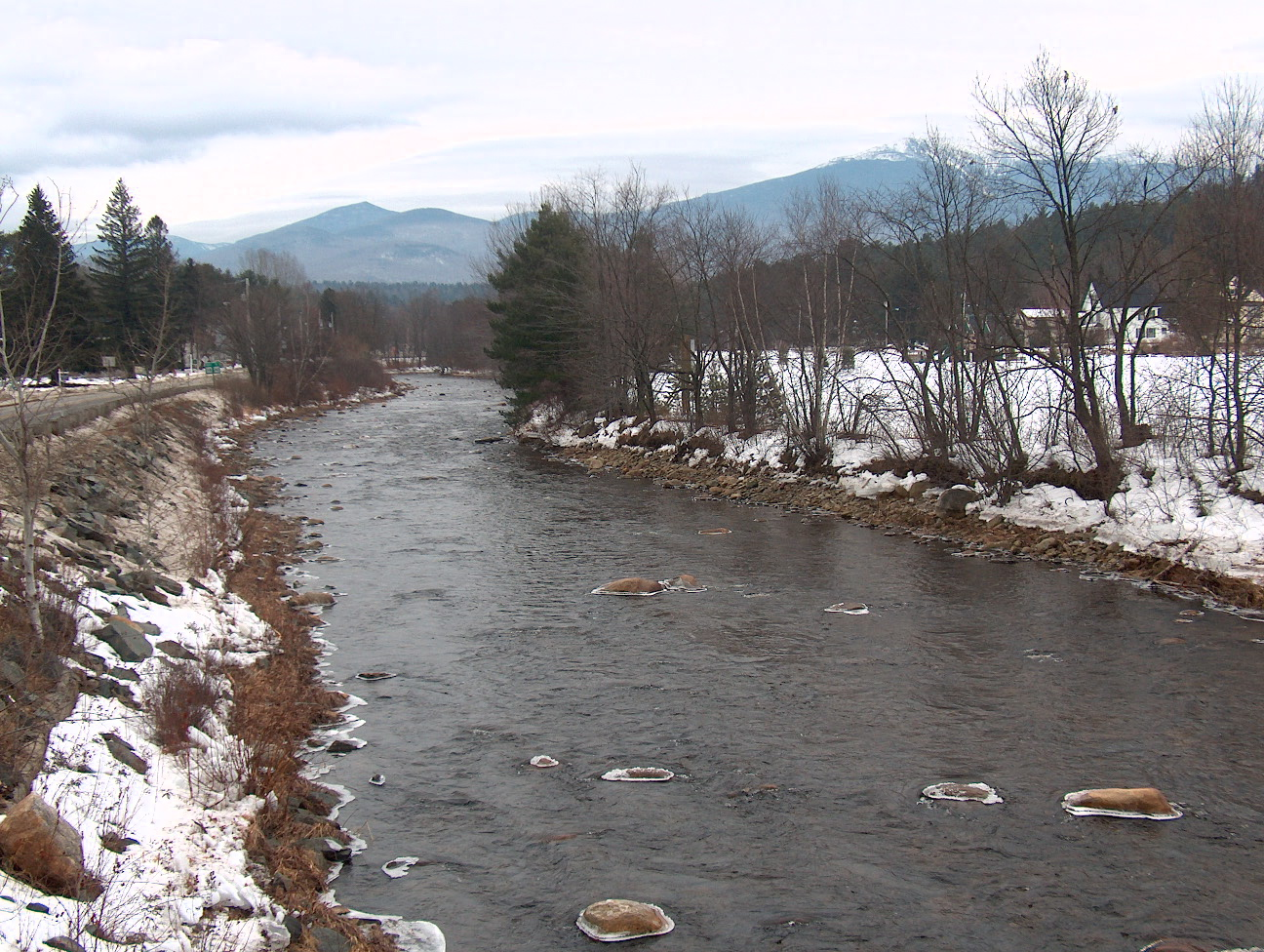
- The Gale River in Franconia, New Hampshire, December 2007. In the distance are Mount Garfield and Mount Lafayette of the White Mountains.

- Location within New Hampshire Location within the United States

Location
- Country: United States
- State: New Hampshire
- County: Grafton
- Towns: Bethelhem, Franconia, Sugar Hill, Lisbon

Physical characteristics
- Source: Confluence of North and South branches
  - location: White Mountain National Forest
  - coordinates: 44°14′37″N 71°38′17″W
  - elevation: 1,310 ft (400 m)
- Mouth: Ammonoosuc River
  - location: Lisbon
  - coordinates: 44°15′23″N 71°49′53″W
  - elevation: 645 ft (197 m)
- Length: 13.1 mi (21.1 km)

Basin features
- Tributaries
  - left: Meadow Brook (also called Lafayette Brook or Pond Brook), Ham Branch, Bowen Brook
  - right: Beaver Brook, Wiseman Brook, Indian Brook

The Gale River is a 13.1-mile-long (21.1 km) tributary of the Ammonoosuc River in northwestern New Hampshire in the United States. Via the Ammonoosuc, it is part of the watershed of the Connecticut River, which flows to Long Island Sound.

The Gale River flows for its entire length in Grafton County. It rises in the White Mountains in the town of Franconia as two short, northward-flowing streams: its North Branch and its South Branch. The two streams join in Bethlehem, and the Gale River flows thence generally westwardly. Returning to Franconia, the river collects the Ham Branch, its most significant tributary, then passes through Sugar Hill to Lisbon, where it joins the Ammonoosuc River.

The 1816 State map of New Hampshire calls the Gale River the "South Branch of the Ammonoosuck River". It may have received its local name because it flowed through the Gale Farm, as shown in a 1796 map of Franconia. A Henry Gale household was listed in the 1790, 1800 and 1810 Franconia Census.

== See also ==
- List of New Hampshire rivers
