= Nubble Peak =

Mountain in New Hampshire, United States

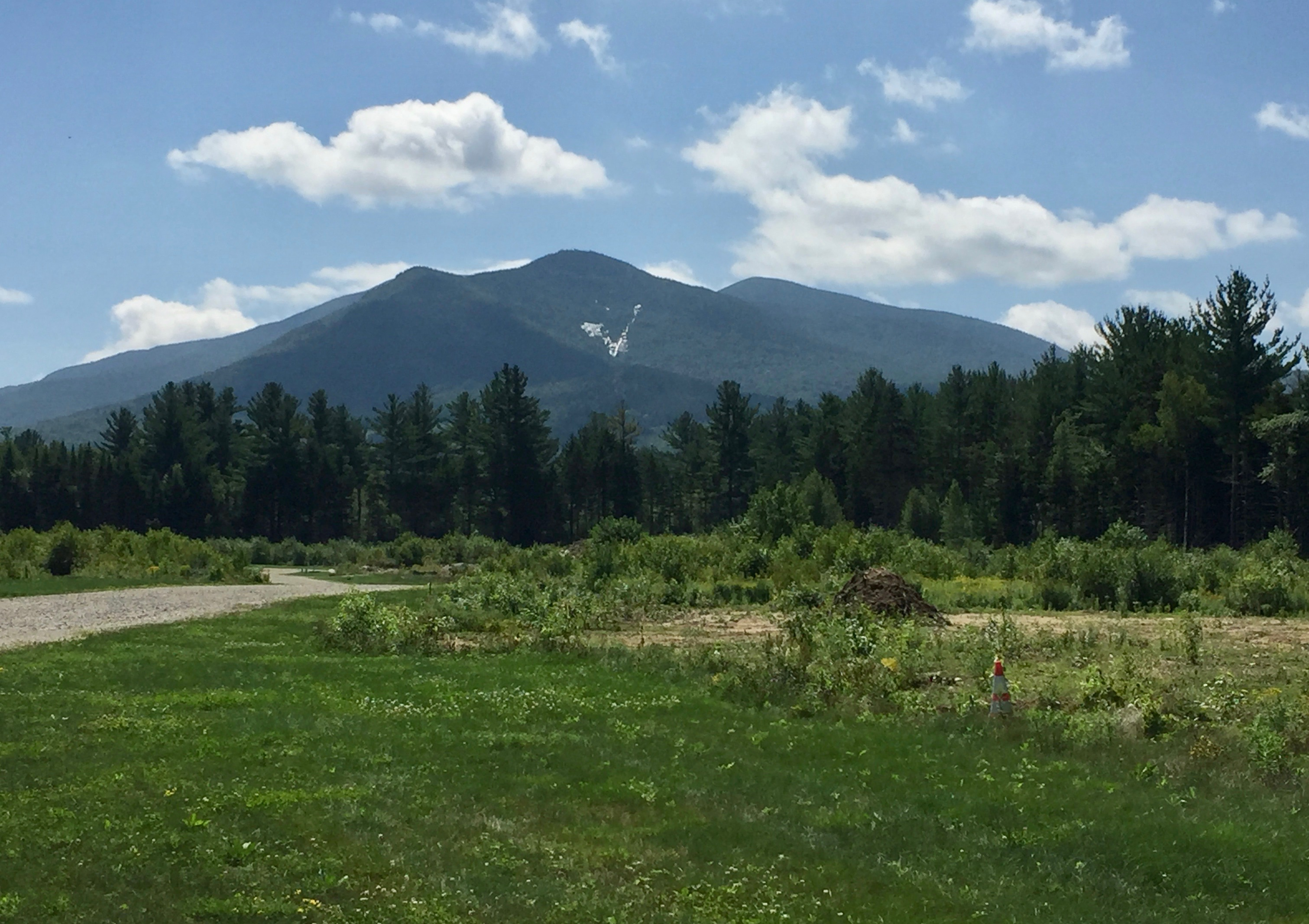
- Nubble Peak (center) overlooking village of Twin Mountain

Highest point
- Elevation: 3,813 ft (1,162 m)
- Prominence: 173 ft (53 m)
- Listing: #88 New England 100 Highest
- Coordinates: 44°13′22″N 71°33′42″W

Geography
- Location: Grafton County, New Hampshire
- Parent range: Twin Range
- Topo map: USGS South Twin Mountain

Nubble Peak, also known as The Peak Above The Nubble, is a mountain located in Grafton County, New Hampshire. The mountain is part of the Twin Range of the White Mountains. A rock outcrop on its northwestern ridge is known as The Nubble, but topographic maps identify the formation as Haystack Mountain. Nubble Peak is flanked to the south by North Twin Mountain. The mountain is officially trailless and is one of New England's hundred highest summits.

Nubble Peak stands within the watershed of the Ammonoosuc River, which drains into the upper Connecticut River, and into Long Island Sound in Connecticut. The east and southeast faces of Nubble Peak drain into the Little River, thence into the Ammonoosuc River. The northwest side of Nubble Peak drains into Haystack Brook, thence into the Ammonoosuc. The southwest end of Nubble Peak drains to the North Branch of the Gale River, another tributary of the Ammonoosuc River.

== See also ==
- List of mountains in New Hampshire
- White Mountain National Forest
- New England Hundred Highest
