= Zealand Notch =

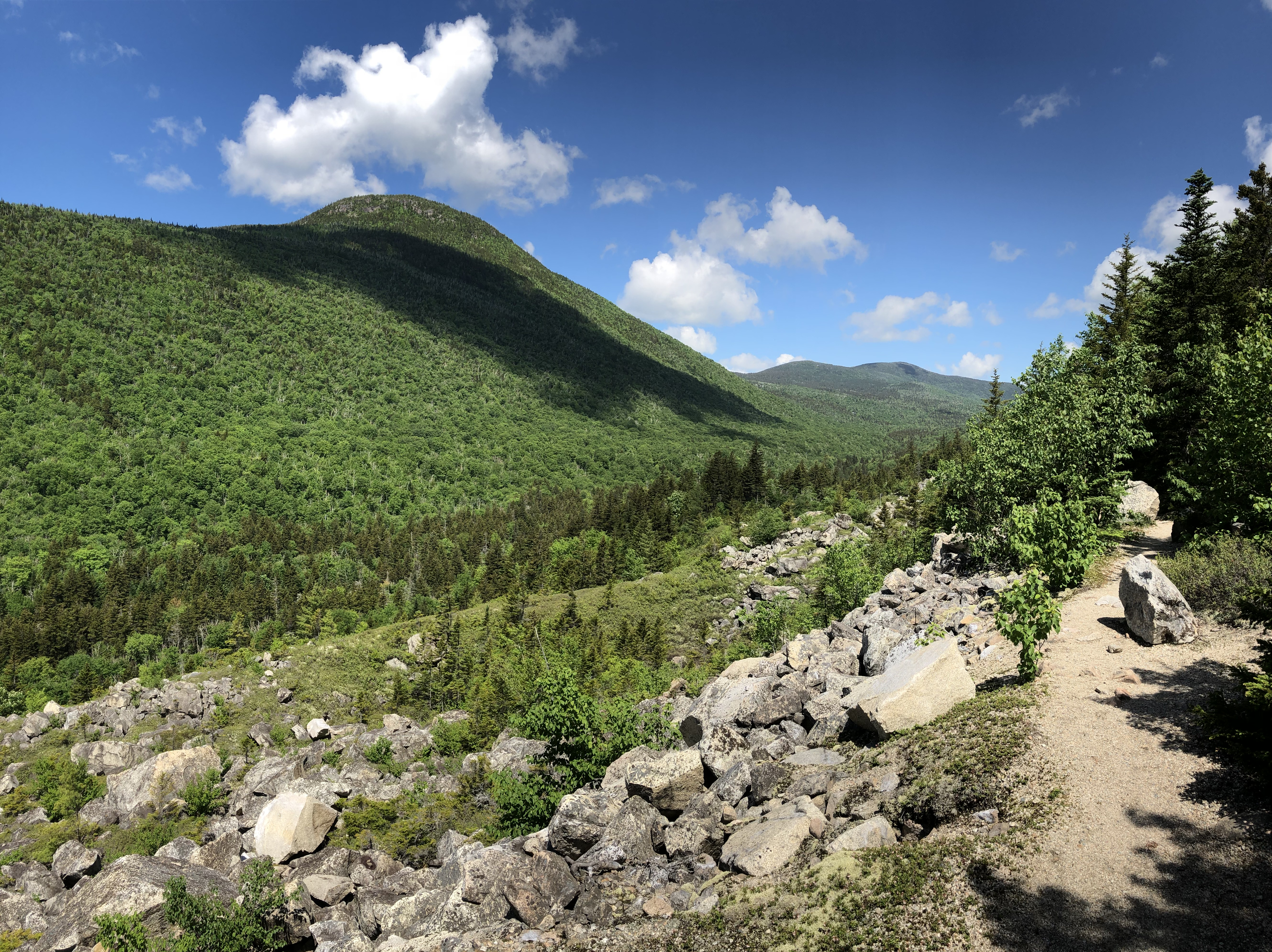
- Zeacliff rising over Zealand Notch; north-facing view from the Ethan Pond Trail
- Interactive map of Zealand Notch
- Elevation: 2,457 feet (749 m)
- Traversed by: Appalachian Trail

Third Approach
- Location: Grafton County, New Hampshire, US
- Range: White Mountains
- Coordinates: 44.1974°N 71.4913°W
- Topo map: USGS Crawford Notch

Zealand Notch (el. 2457 ft./749 m.) is a mountain pass in the White Mountains of New Hampshire, United States. It is located in the towns of Bethlehem and Lincoln, near the northeastern corner of the Pemigewasset Wilderness. The center of the notch is traversed by hiking trails and is approximately 2 miles (3 km) from the nearest road. Zealand Pond, Zealand Falls, and the Zealand Falls hut are located near the height of land.

Similarly to Crawford Notch to the east, the main body of Zealand Notch comprises a steep-walled, U-shaped valley running southwards from the height of land. Whitewall Brook flows through the bottom of the notch, reaching the North Fork of the Pemigewasset River at the south end of the notch. Water from Whitewall Brook flows via branches and the main stem of the Pemigewasset to the Merrimack River and ultimately the Gulf of Maine. North of the notch's height of land, the Zealand River flows north to the Ammonoosuc River near the village of Twin Mountain, with the streamflow eventually reaching the Connecticut River and turning south again to ultimately reach Long Island Sound.

The notch lies between Whitewall Mountain (3,405 ft./1,038 m.) to the east and Zeacliff (approx. 3,600 ft./1,097 m.), an eastern arm of Zealand Mountain, to the west. The Appalachian Trail traverses Zealand Notch. From the west, the trail (paired with the Twinway trail) descends from Zeacliff past Zealand Falls (a long series of smooth granite ledges ending in a 50-foot (15 m) drop over vertical granite) and Zealand Falls Hut to the center of the notch. Here the Twinway ends, and the Appalachian Trail turns south and follows the Ethan Pond Trail along an old railroad grade through the notch, along the side of Whitewall Mountain, exiting the south end of the notch and continuing east towards Crawford Notch. Other trails in Zealand Notch include the Zealand Trail approaching along the Zealand River from the north, the Lend-a-Hand Trail which reaches Zealand Falls Hut from Mount Hale to the northwest, and the Zeacliff Trail, which descends from the top of Zeacliff straight down the notch wall to Whitewall Brook and the Ethan Pond Trail. The A–Z Trail leaves the Zealand Trail just north of the height of land of the notch and leads east to Crawford Notch at its height of land.

== See also ==
- List of mountain passes in New Hampshire
