= Carroll, New Hampshire =

- Town
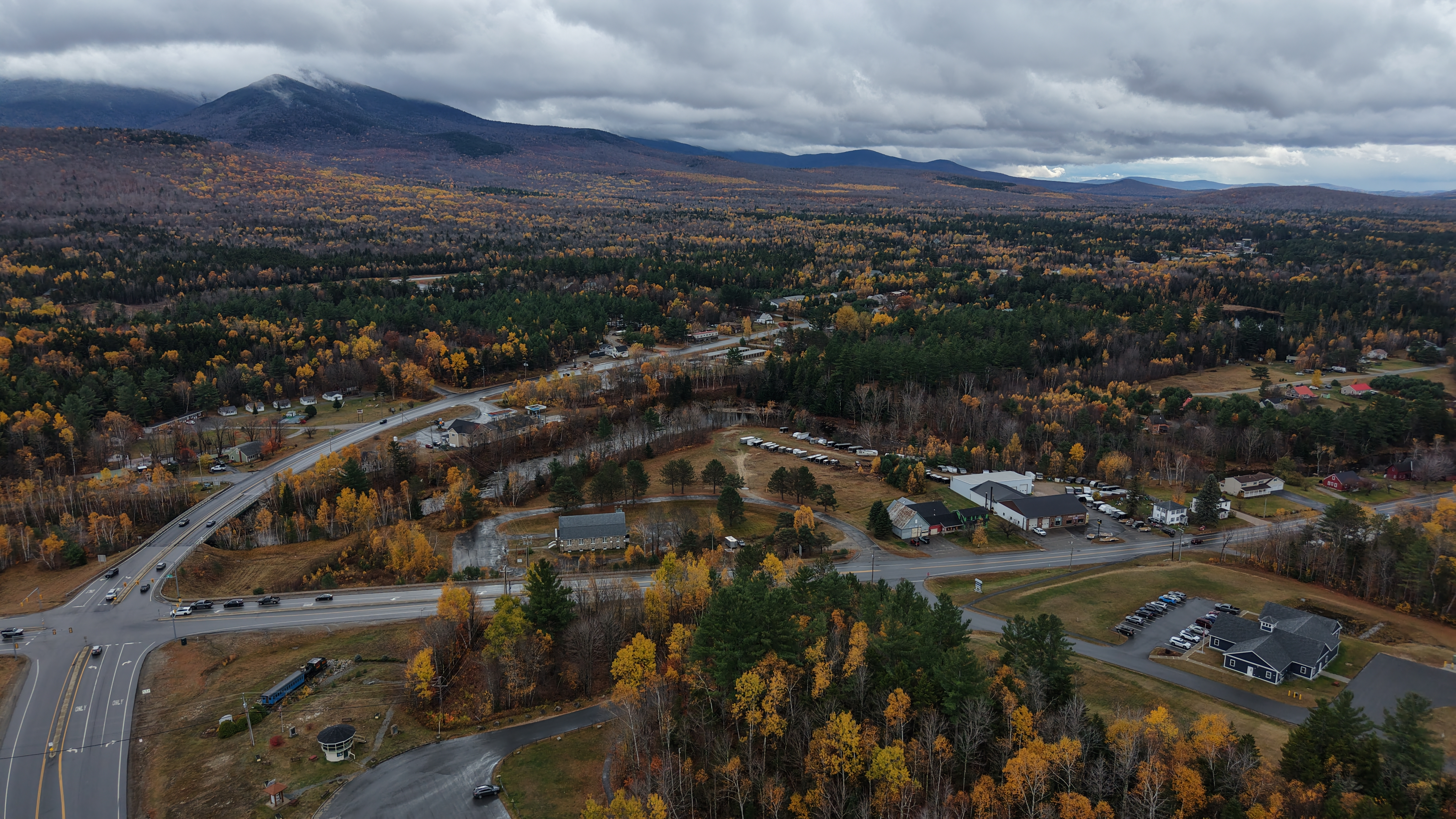
- Village of Twin Mountain from the northeast

- Logo

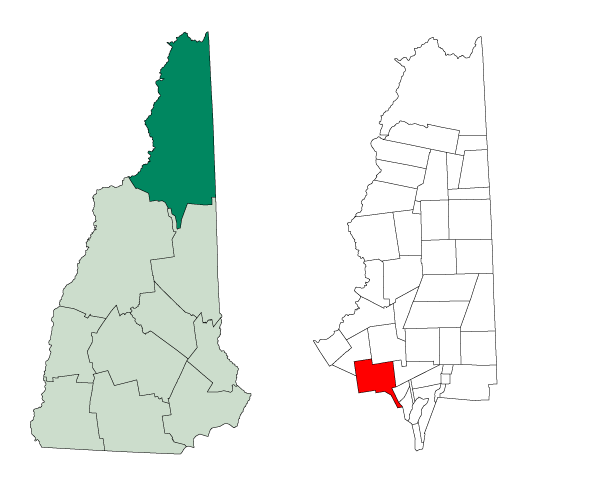
- Location in Coös County, New Hampshire
- Coordinates: 44°17′54″N 71°32′26″W
- Country: United States
- State: New Hampshire
- County: Coös
- Incorporated: 1832
- Villages: Bretton Woods; Carroll; Fabyan; Twin Mountain

Area
  - Total: 50.30 sq mi (130.27 km^{2})
  - Land: 50.27 sq mi (130.20 km^{2})
  - Water: 0.023 sq mi (0.06 km^{2}) 0.05%
- Elevation: 2,477 ft (755 m)

Population (2020)
  - Total: 820
  - Density: 16/sq mi (6.3/km^{2})
- Time zone: UTC-5 (Eastern)
  - Summer (DST): UTC-4 (Eastern)
- ZIP codes: 03575 (Bretton Woods); 03595 (Twin Mountain)
- Area code: 603
- FIPS code: 33-10100
- GNIS feature ID: 873560
- Website: carrollnh.gov

Carroll is a town in Coös County, New Hampshire, United States. The population was 820 at the 2020 census, and an estimated 841 in 2025. The two largest villages are Twin Mountain and Bretton Woods. Carroll is an important access point for recreational areas in the White Mountains, including many 4,000-footers, the Zealand River area, the Presidential Range, and the Presidential Dry River Wilderness. The town is home to the Mount Washington Hotel at Bretton Woods and to the Highland Center at Crawford Notch, the Appalachian Mountain Club's four-season lodge.

Carroll is part of the Berlin, NH-VT Micropolitan Statistical Area.

== History ==
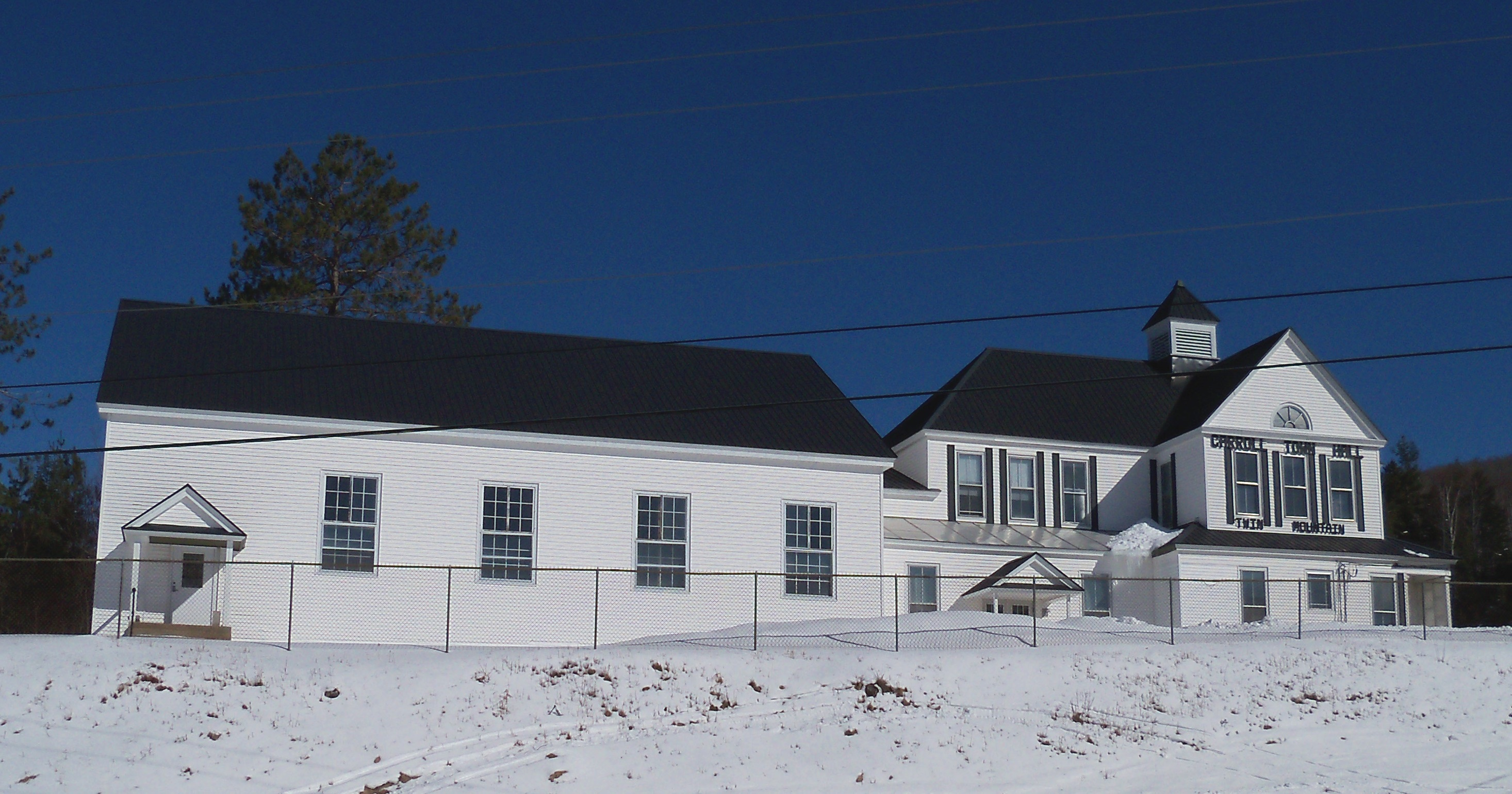
Carroll Town Hall

Land was granted by Governor John Wentworth on February 8, 1772, to Sir Thomas Wentworth, Samuel Langdon, and 81 others. Sir Thomas Wentworth resided in West Bretton, England, on his estate called Bretton Hall, after which the township was named "Bretton Woods". On the 1816 Carrigain map of New Hampshire, it appears as "Breton Woods". On June 22, 1832, the town was incorporated by the General Court as Carroll, in honor of Charles Carroll, a signer of the Declaration of Independence.

Although the surface is uneven and bounded by mountains, farmers found the soil "strong and deep". It has many small streams, tributaries of the Ammonoosuc River, which in the 19th-century were noted for abundant trout. By 1859, Carroll had a starch factory, and two lumber mills that produced boards, shingles, clapboards and laths. By 1874, the Wing Railroad, a branch of the Boston, Concord and Montreal Railroad, extended into the town.

It was, however, tourism that brought fame and prosperity to the area. Hannah and Abel Crawford turned their log cabin into an inn, then built the Notch House in 1828. In 1874, the Boston, Concord & Montreal Railroad reached Fabyan Station, an important junction joined the next year by the Portland & Ogdensburg Railroad. Here stood the Fabyan House, a grand hotel built by Sylvester Marsh and his colleagues, who also built the nearby Mount Washington Cog Railway. The hotel burned in 1951. The Mount Pleasant House was built in 1875, although demolished in 1939. But the grandest of all was the Mount Washington Hotel, built in 1902 and still operating. Here was held the 1944 International Monetary Conference, which resulted in the creation of the IMF and World Bank.

=== Zealand ===
Zealand was a logging community within Carroll, established by James Everell Henry (1831–1912) c. 1880. By 1884, Henry had started the Zealand Valley Railroad, which would extend about 11 miles (18 km) into the forest. Zealand was a company town with various buildings including a boarding house, store, engine house, and a post office that operated from 1883 to 1897. After much lumber had been removed through clearcutting, Henry moved his operations to Lincoln in 1892. George Van Dyke then leased land and the Zealand mill from Henry, and constructed the Little River Railroad in 1893. Following a major fire in May 1897, and the removal of most remaining lumber, the railroad and ultimately Zealand were abandoned c. 1900. A few remnants of the Zealand community can still be found.

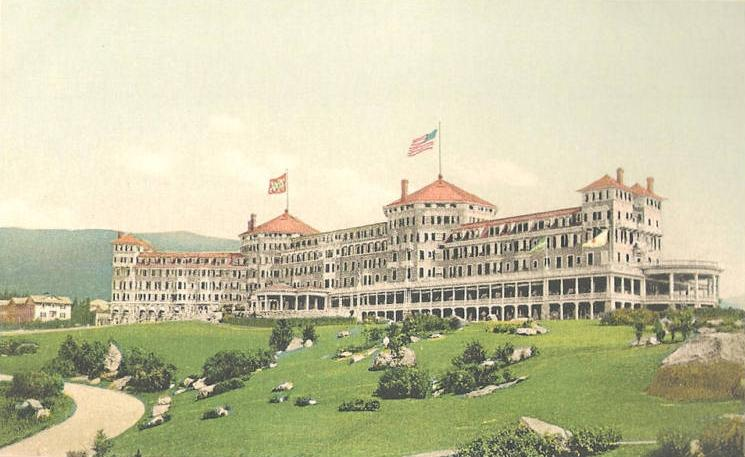
The Mount Washington Hotel c. 1906

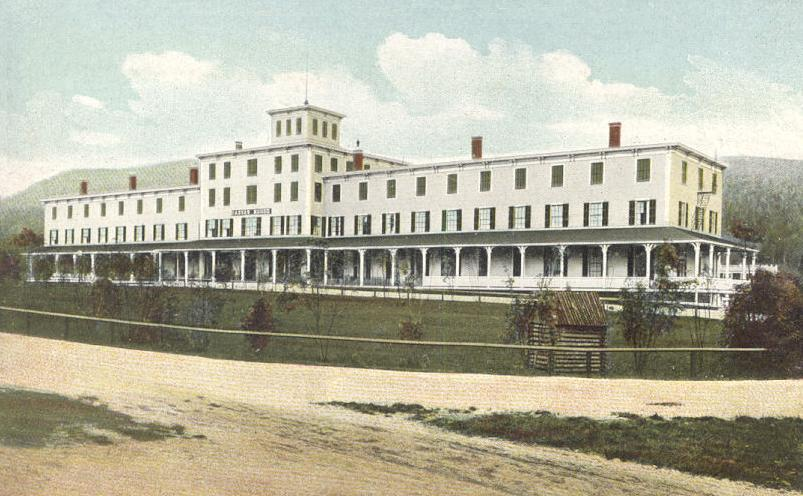
The Fabyan House c. 1908

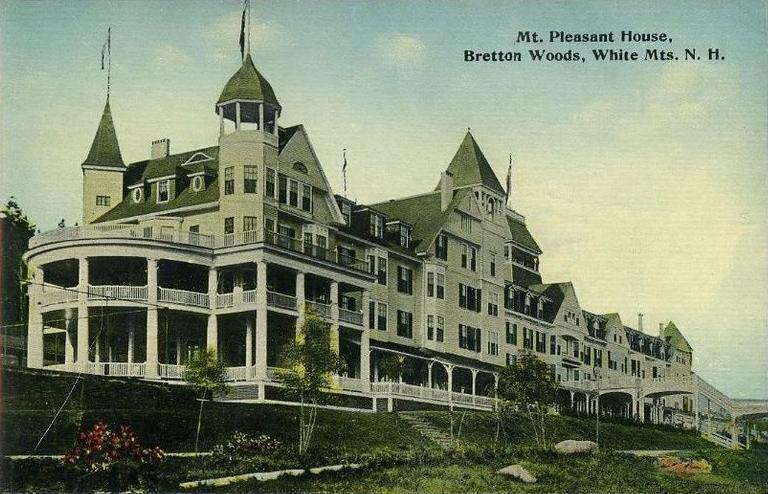
The Mt. Pleasant House c. 1912

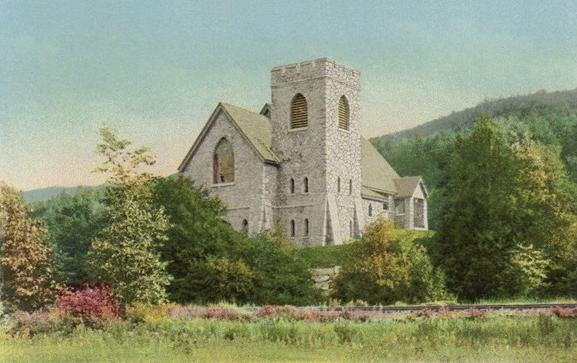
Stickney Memorial Chapel c. 1910

== Geography ==
The Mount Washington Hotel and Ammonoosuc River in the Bretton Woods portion of Carroll

There are several villages in the town.

- Twin Mountain, which has a small airstrip, is primarily a summer and winter resort located at the intersection of U.S. Route 3 from Franconia and U.S. Route 302 from Bethlehem.
- Bretton Woods is a year-round recreational and resort area on Route 302, southeast toward Hart's Location.
- Adjacent to Bretton Woods at the junction of the Mount Washington Cog Railway Base Station Road with Route 302 is the former train station of Fabyan.
- Two miles north of Twin Mountain along Route 3 is the small village of Carroll proper.

New Hampshire Route 115 leads from Carroll to Jefferson, with scenic views of Whitefield, Lancaster and the northern White Mountains.

A substantial portion of the town is part of the White Mountain National Forest, including Cherry Mountain ("Mount Martha", at 3,554 feet (1,083 m) above sea level), which is traversed by the Cohos Trail; and part of the Dartmouth Range, which contains Mount Deception, the 3,670-foot (1,120 m) summit of which is the highest point in town. The southeastern corner of town boasts the Mount Washington Hotel and the height of land in Crawford Notch. The Ammonoosuc River rises at the confluence of several brooks and flows westward generally along Route 302 through town. The Saco River begins at Saco Lake in Crawford Notch and runs south-southeast to the Maine coast.

According to the United States Census Bureau, the town has a total area of 50.3 square miles (130.3 km^{2}), of which 0.023 square miles (0.06 km^{2}) are water, comprising 0.05% of the town. Carroll lies almost fully within the Connecticut River watershed, leading south to Long Island Sound; the southernmost tip of the town surrounding Saco Lake, however, is part of the Saco River watershed, leading east to the Gulf of Maine.

=== Adjacent municipalities ===
- Jefferson (north)
- Low and Burbank's Grant (east)
- Crawford's Purchase (southeast)
- Bean's Grant (southeast)
- Hart's Location (southeast)
- Bethlehem (south)
- Whitefield (northwest)

== Demographics ==
Historical population
Census	Pop.	Note	%±
1830	108		—
1840	218		101.9%
1850	296		35.8%
1860	276		−6.8%
1870	378		37.0%
1880	632		67.2%
1890	813		28.6%
1900	710		−12.7%
1910	569		−19.9%
1920	388		−31.8%
1930	402		3.6%
1940	496		23.4%
1950	359		−27.6%
1960	295		−17.8%
1970	310		5.1%
1980	647		108.7%
1990	528		−18.4%
2000	663		25.6%
2010	763		15.1%
2020	820		7.5%
U.S. Decennial Census

As of the census of 2000, there were 663 people, 279 households, and 189 families residing in the town. The population density was 13.2 inhabitants per square mile (5.1/km^{2}). There were 740 housing units at an average density of 14.7 per square mile (5.7/km^{2}). The racial makeup of the town was 98.79% White, 0.75% Asian, 0.15% from other races, and 0.30% from two or more races. Hispanic or Latino of any race were 0.60% of the population.

There were 279 households, out of which 24.4% had children under the age of 18 living with them, 56.3% were married couples living together, 7.9% had a female householder with no husband present, and 31.9% were non-families. 25.4% of all households were made up of individuals, and 10.0% had someone living alone who was 65 years of age or older. The average household size was 2.34 and the average family size was 2.76.

In the town, the population was spread out, with 21.0% under the age of 18, 6.3% from 18 to 24, 26.7% from 25 to 44, 31.2% from 45 to 64, and 14.8% who were 65 years of age or older. The median age was 43 years. For every 100 females, there were 103.4 males. For every 100 females age 18 and over, there were 107.9 males.

The median income for a household in the town was $39,286, and the median income for a family was $45,227. Males had a median income of $27,426 versus $20,781 for females. The per capita income for the town was $18,734. About 3.1% of families and 6.9% of the population were below the poverty line, including 4.8% of those under age 18 and 12.4% of those age 65 or over.

== See also ==
- New Hampshire historical markers:
  - Number 30: The Crawford Family
  - Number 87: Crawford House
  - Number 122: Mount Washington Hotel / Bretton Woods Monetary Conference
  - Number 233: Zealand and James Everell Henry
  - Number 274: Beecher's Pulpit
- Twin Range
  - North Twin Mountain (New Hampshire)
  - South Twin Mountain (New Hampshire)
- White Mountain art
