= Little River (Ammonoosuc River tributary) =

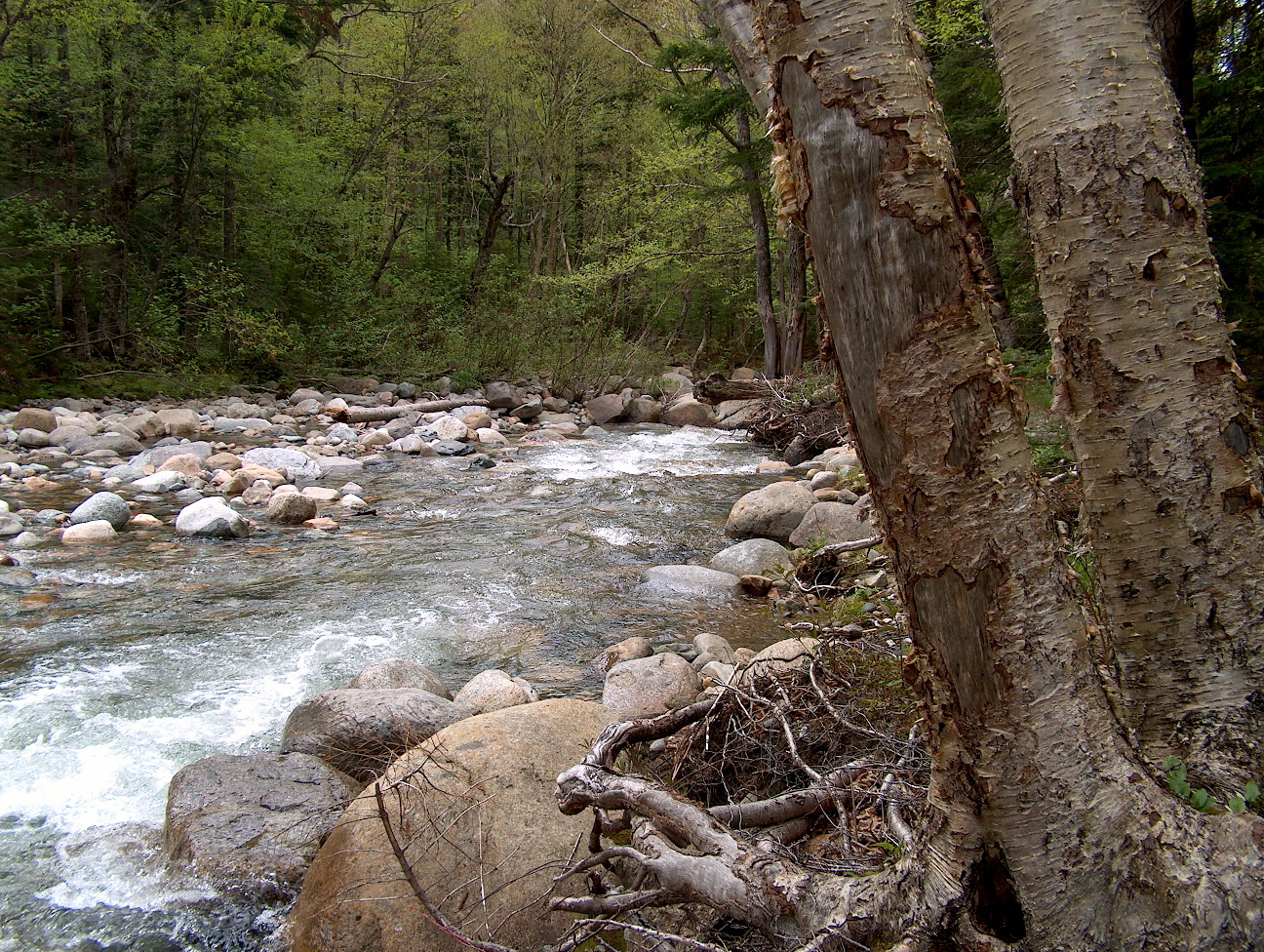
- The Little River along the North Twin Trail

- Location within New Hampshire Location within the United States

Location
- Country: United States
- State: New Hampshire
- Counties: Grafton, Coos
- Towns: Livermore, Bethlehem, Carroll

Physical characteristics
- Source: Twin Range
  - location: White Mountain National Forest
  - coordinates: 44°10′51″N 71°31′45″W
  - elevation: 3,320 ft (1,010 m)
- Mouth: Ammonoosuc River
  - location: Twin Mountain (Carroll)
  - coordinates: 44°16′15″N 71°34′18″W
  - elevation: 1,319 ft (402 m)
- Length: 7.4 mi (11.9 km)

The Little River is a 7.4-mile-long (11.9 km) river in the White Mountains of New Hampshire in the United States. It is a tributary of the Ammonoosuc River and part of the Connecticut River watershed.

The Little River rises in the White Mountain National Forest in a small cirque in the Twin Range, with Zealand Mountain to the east, Mount Guyot to the south, and South Twin Mountain to the west. The river flows north into the town of Bethlehem, through a deep valley between North Twin Mountain to the west and Mount Hale to the east. Eventually the river enters the town of Carroll near the community of Twin Mountain, passes under U.S. Route 3, and ends at the Ammonoosuc River.

The Little River is a public water supply for the village of Twin Mountain. A portion of the river is paralleled by (and crossed three times by) the North Twin Trail, a hiking trail.

== See also ==
- List of rivers of New Hampshire
