= Nova (American TV program) =

American popular science public television program (since 1974)

- Created by: Michael Ambrosino
- Developed by: Michael Ambrosino
- Theme music composer: Walter Werzowa; John Luker; Musikvergnuegen, Inc.; Ray Loring (additional)
- Country of origin: United States
- Original language: English
- No. of seasons: 53
- No. of episodes: 1008 (February 11, 2026) (list of episodes)

Production
- Executive producers: Paula Apsell (senior); Julia Cort; Chris Schmidt
- Running time: 60 minutes
- Production company: WGBH-TV

Original release
- Network: PBS
- Release: March 3, 1974 – present

Related
- Horizon (British TV series); Frontline; Nova ScienceNow

Nova (stylized as NOVΛ) is an American popular science television program produced by WGBH in Boston, Massachusetts, since 1974. It is broadcast on PBS in the United States, and in more than 100 other countries. The program has won many major television awards.

Nova often includes interviews with scientists doing research in the subject areas covered and occasionally includes footage of a particular discovery. Some episodes have focused on the history of science. Examples of topics covered include the following: Colditz Castle, the Drake equation, elementary particles, the 1980 eruption of Mount St. Helens, Fermat's Last Theorem, the AIDS epidemic, global warming, moissanite, Project Jennifer, storm chasing, Unterseeboot 869, Vinland, Tarim mummies, and the COVID-19 pandemic.

The Nova programs have been praised for their pacing, writing, and editing. Websites that accompany the segments have also won awards.

== History ==
Nova was first aired on March 3, 1974. The show was created by Michael Ambrosino, inspired by the BBC 2 television series Horizon, which Ambrosino had seen while working in the UK. In the early years, many Nova episodes were either co-productions with the BBC Horizon team, or other documentaries originating outside of the United States, with the narration re-voiced in American English. Of the first 50 programs, only 19 were original WGBH productions, and the first Nova episode, "The Making of a Natural History Film", was originally an episode of Horizon that premiered in 1972. The practice continues to this day. All the producers and associate producers for the original Nova teams came from either England (with experience on the Horizon series), Los Angeles or New York. Ambrosino was succeeded as executive producer by John Angier, John Mansfield, and Paula S. Apsell, acting as senior executive producer.

== Reception ==
Rob Owen of Pittsburgh Post-Gazette wrote, "Fascinating and gripping." Alex Strachan of Calgary Herald wrote, "TV for people who don't normally watch TV." Lynn Elber of the Associated Press wrote for the miniseries "The Fabric of the Cosmos", "Mind-blowing TV." The Futon Critic wrote of the episode "Looking for Life on Mars", "Astounding [and] exhilarating."

=== Awards ===
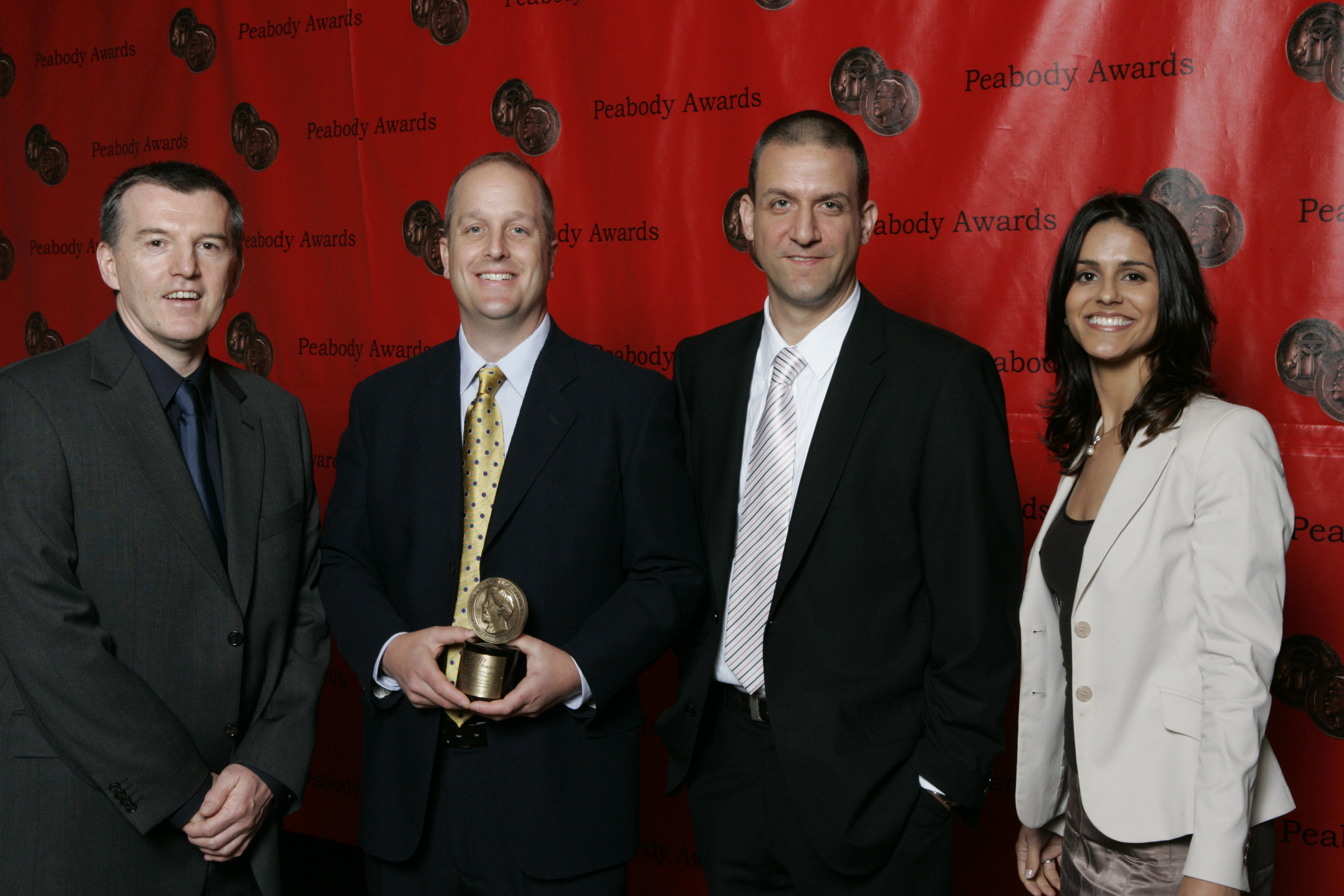
Joe McMaster and the crew of "Judgement Day" at the 67th Annual Peabody Awards

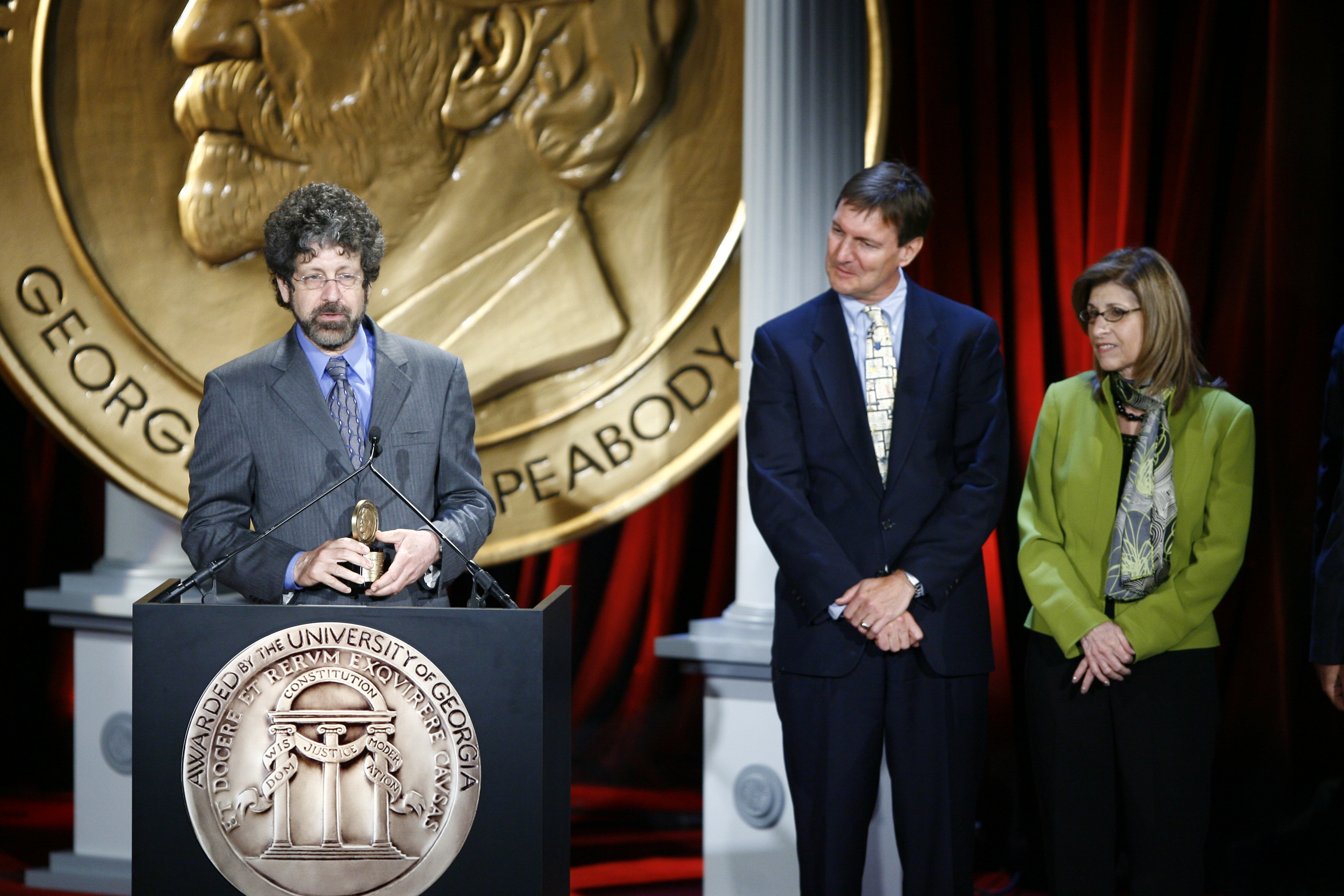
John Rubin, John Bredar and Paula Apsell at the 68th Annual Peabody Awards for "Ape Genius".

Nova has been recognized with multiple Peabody Awards and Emmy Awards. The program won a Peabody in 1974, citing it as "an imaginative series of science adventures," with a "versatility rarely found in television." Subsequent Peabodys went to specific episodes:

- "The Miracle of Life" (1983) was cited as a "fascinating and informative documentary of the human reproductive process," which used "revolutionary microphotographic techniques." This episode also won an Emmy.
- "Spy Machines" (1987) was cited for "neatly recount[ing] the key events of the Cold War and look[ing] into the future of American/Soviet SDI competition."
- "The Elegant Universe" (2003) was lauded for exploring "science's most elaborate and ambitious theory, the string theory" while making "the abstract concrete, the complicated clear, and the improbable understandable" by "blending factual story telling with animation, special effects, and trick photography." The episode also won an Emmy for editing.

The National Academy of Television Arts and Sciences (responsible for documentary Emmys) recognized the program with awards in 1978, 1981, 1983, and 1989. Julia Cort won an Emmy in 2001 for writing "Life's Greatest Miracle." Emmys were also awarded for the following episodes:

- 1982 "Here's Looking at You, Kid"
- 1983 "The Miracle of Life" (also won a Peabody)
- 1985 "AIDS: Chapter One", "Acid Rain: New Bad News"
- 1992 "Suicide Mission to Chernobyl", "The Russian Right Stuff"
- 1994 "Secret of the Wild Child"
- 1995 "Siamese Twins", "Secret of the Wild Child"
- 1999 "Decoding Nazi Secrets"
- 2001 "Bioterror"
- 2002 "Galileo's Battle for the Heavens", "Mountain of Ice", "Shackleton's Voyage of Endurance", "Why the Towers Fell"
- 2003 "Battle of the X-planes", "The Elegant Universe" (also won a Peabody)
- 2005 "Rx for Survival: A Global Health Challenge"

In 1998, the National Science Board of the National Science Foundation awarded Nova its first-ever Public Service Award.
