= Ray Loring =

American television music composer (1943–2008)

Charles Raymond Loring II
- Born: May 20, 1943; Chicago, Illinois
- Died: September 6, 2008 (aged 65); Nubble Peak, Twin Mountain, New Hampshire
- Resting place: Georgetown, Massachusetts
- Education: Yale, B.A.; Brandeis, M.A.
- Occupations: Music composer; College professor
- Notable work: June on the Merrimack, Celebration for Flute and String Orchestra, Mt. Ida 1997
- Musical career
- Instruments: Synthesizer

Charles Raymond Loring II (May 20, 1943 – September 6, 2008), known professionally as "Ray Loring", was a classically trained American television music composer and professor, in Massachusetts.

Born in Illinois to Howard and Rena Loring, they moved to Georgetown, Massachusetts. He graduated from Perley High School in his home town of Georgetown. He studied piano with Fred Noonan, the White House pianist to Franklin Roosevelt and Harry Truman. He studied at Yale University at Timothy Dwight College; particularly with the late Edmund Morgan. He was a member of Scroll and Key.

During his senior year at Yale he was granted the Woodrow Wilson Fellowship and used it for his studies at Brandeis University Graduate School of Music; studying under Seymour Shifrin, Arthur Berger and Harold Shapero.

Loring taught music, performed, and conducted at Endicott College from 1980 to 1992. He then went to freelance music composing full-time, but lectured regularly at Amherst College and Northern Essex Community College. He had recently returned to teaching, on the music faculty at Gordon College.

Loring composed his first film score in 1971, the locally acclaimed short film "Ruby". He continued composing throughout his life. During the course of his career, Loring composed scores for more than 100 episodes of PBS/WGBH Boston's NOVA series, plus the theme music.

He contributed music to many other PBS, Discovery Channel, History Channel episodes; in addition to work with museum installations, historical visitor centers, etc. throughout the U.S. including the Harry Truman Museum, the theater at the National Archives Rotunda, the Museum of the Mississippi, and the Brooklyn Historical Society. In 2004 he was commissioned to provide an arrangement for the Astoria Jazz Band, for inclusion in the 9th Annual Festival of Women in Jazz Composers at the Kennedy Center in Washington, DC.

Loring composed for and performed with the Essex Chamber Music Players in Andover, Massachusetts. A recording of Loring's "June on the Merrimack", which sets to music the words of local abolitionist poet John Greenleaf Whittier, is being prepared by the Essex Chamber Music Players (ECMP) and will be released in 2020. In his leisure he enjoyed mountain hiking, and had completed the New Hampshire 48 and the New England 67. He died suddenly on a cold, stormy day, near the top of Nubble Peak in New Hampshire, despite rescue efforts of his fellow hikers (see https://viewsfromthetop.com).

Commissions and scores

Nova (music theme) (53 episodes, 1997–2007) (composer: theme music) (2 episodes, 2006)

- Pocahontas Revealed (2007) TV episode (music theme)
- Saved by the Sun (2007) TV episode (music theme)
- Kings of Camouflage (2007) TV episode (music theme)
- First Flower (2007) TV episode (music theme)
- The Last Great Ape (2007) TV episode (music theme)

Nova ScienceNow (music theme) (39 episodes, 2005–2007)

- Aging (2007) TV episode (music theme)
- Maya (2007) TV episode (music theme)
- Profile: Bonnie Bassler (2007) TV episode (music theme)
- Space Elevator (2007) TV episode (music theme)
- 1918 Flu (2006) TV episode (music theme)

Why the Towers Fell (2002) (TV) (composer: additional music)

Composer:

"Nova" (9 episodes, 1998–2006)

- The Deadliest Plane Crash (2006) TV episode
- Saving the National Treasures (2005) TV episode
- Descent Into the Ice (2004) TV episode
- Dogs and More Dogs (2004) TV episode
- Dirty Bomb (2003) TV episode

Einstein Revealed (1996) (TV)

- "Secrets of Lost Empires II" (1996) TV series (unknown episodes)
- Ruby (1971) Producer
