= Mount Guyot (New Hampshire) =

Mountain in the state of New Hampshire

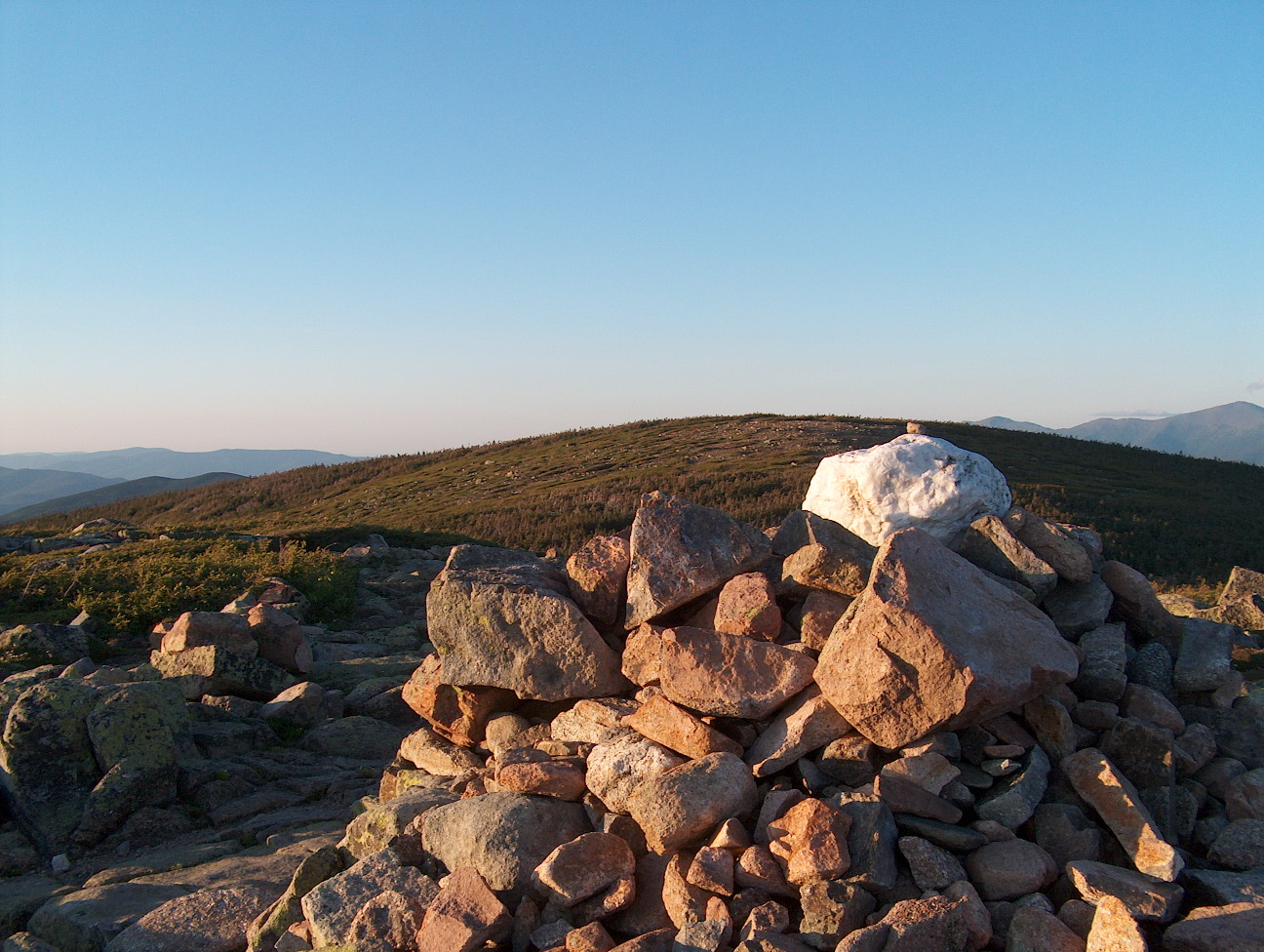
- Mount Guyot at sunset

Highest point
- Elevation: 4581+ ft (1396+ m) NGVD 29
- Prominence: 220 ft (67 m)
- Coordinates: 44°10′05″N 71°32′02″W

Geography
- Location: Grafton County, New Hampshire, U.S.
- Parent range: Twin Range
- Topo map: USGS South Twin Mountain

Mount Guyot is a mountain located in Grafton County, New Hampshire. The mountain is named after Professor Arnold H. Guyot (1807–1884) of Princeton University, and is part of the Twin Range of the White Mountains. Mount Guyot is flanked to the northwest by South Twin Mountain, to the northeast by Mount Zealand, and to the south by Mount Bond. Guyot is on the northern boundary of the Pemigewasset Wilderness. The immediate area around the summit consists of high-altitude spruce-fir forest or krummholz.

The north face of Mount Guyot drains into the Little River, thence into the Ammonoosuc and Connecticut rivers, and into Long Island Sound in Connecticut. The southeast face of Guyot drains into Jumping Brook, thence into the North Fork of the East Branch of the Pemigewasset River, thence into the Pemigewasset and Merrimack rivers, and into the Gulf of Maine in Massachusetts. The southwest face of Guyot drains into the Franconia Branch of the East Branch of the Pemigewasset River.

The Appalachian Trail, a 2,170-mile (3,500-km) National Scenic Trail from Georgia to Maine, runs along the ridges from South Twin to Zealand, crossing the summit of Guyot. Although well over 4,000 feet (1,200 m) in height, the Appalachian Mountain Club doesn't consider Mount Guyot a "four-thousand footer" because federal topographic maps show the summit of Guyot as rising less than 200 feet (60 m) above the col separating it from Mount Bond. More recent lidar data sets, however, show the summit rising 220 feet (67 m) above the col.

== See also ==
- List of mountains in New Hampshire
- White Mountain National Forest
