= Mount Zealand =

Mountain in New Hampshire

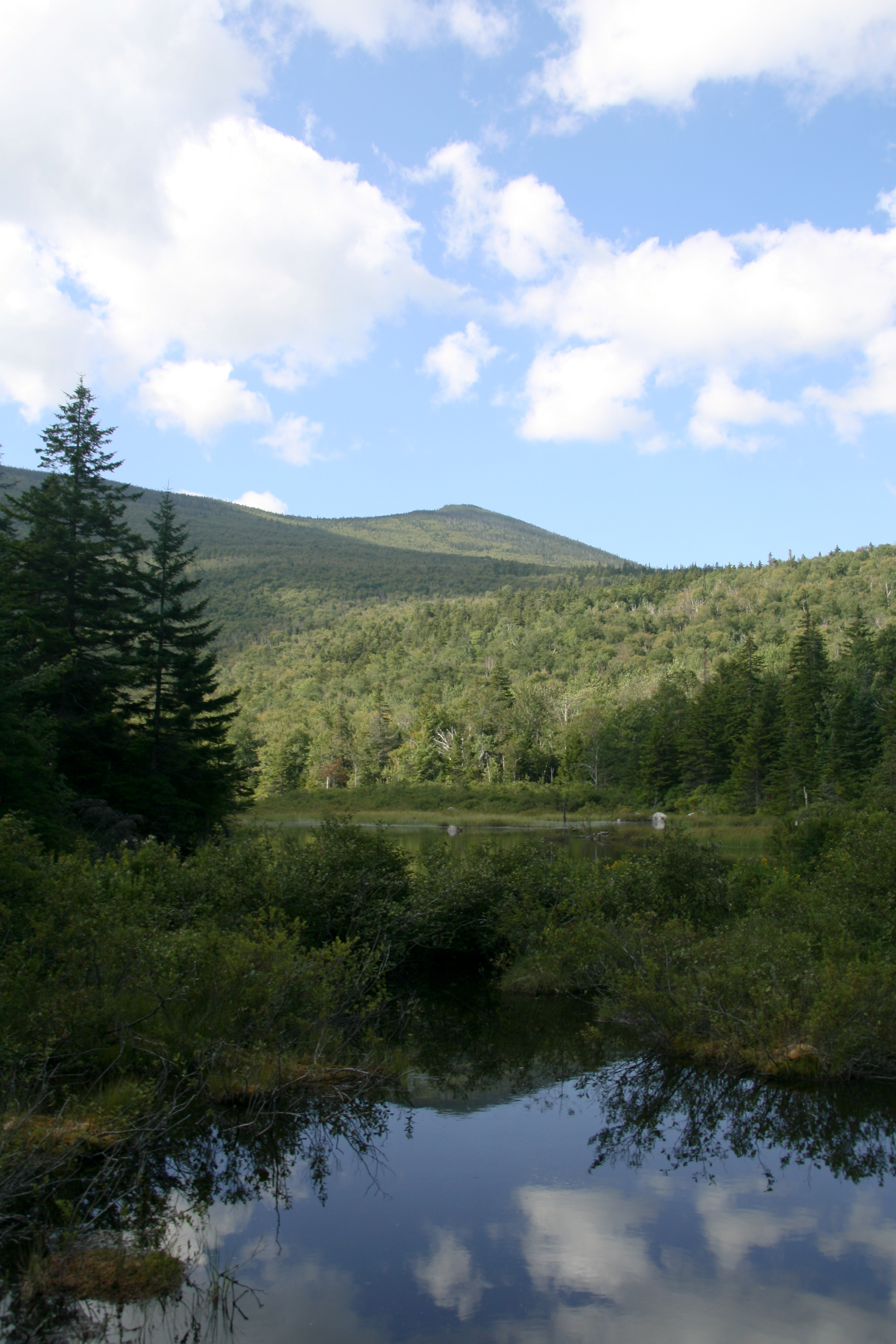
- Mt. Zealand as viewed from Zealand Pond.

Highest point
- Elevation: 1,300 m (4,300 ft)
- Prominence: 75 m (246 ft)
- Listing: White Mountain 4000-Footers
- Coordinates: 44°10.78′N 71°31.28′W

Geography
- Location: Grafton County, New Hampshire, U.S.
- Parent range: Twin Range
- Topo map: USGS South Twin Mountain

Mount Zealand, or Zealand Mountain, is a mountain located in the White Mountains, in Grafton County, New Hampshire. Zealand stands on a spur ridge northeast of Mount Guyot, and facing Whitewall Mountain to the east across Zealand Notch.

Zealand's south and northeast sides drain into the North Fork Pemigewasset River, thence into the Pemigewasset and Merrimack rivers, reaching the Gulf of Maine in Massachusetts. The west side drains into the Little River, thence into the Ammonoosuc and Connecticut rivers, reaching Long Island Sound in Connecticut.

The Twinway, a section of the Appalachian Trail, a 2,186-mile (3,518-km) National Scenic Trail from Georgia to Maine, crosses Zealand. Zealand is a popular hiking destination, with attractions including the Zeacliffs, on the eastern end of its ridgeline, just off the Appalachian Trail, offering dramatic views across Zealand Notch, to the Presidential and Willey Ranges and to Mount Carrigain, as well as Zealand Falls, for which a neighboring Appalachian Mountain Club hut is named, also along the Appalachian Trail, near the notch and downhill to the north from Zeacliffs.

== See also ==
- List of mountains in New Hampshire
- White Mountain National Forest
