= Zealand River =

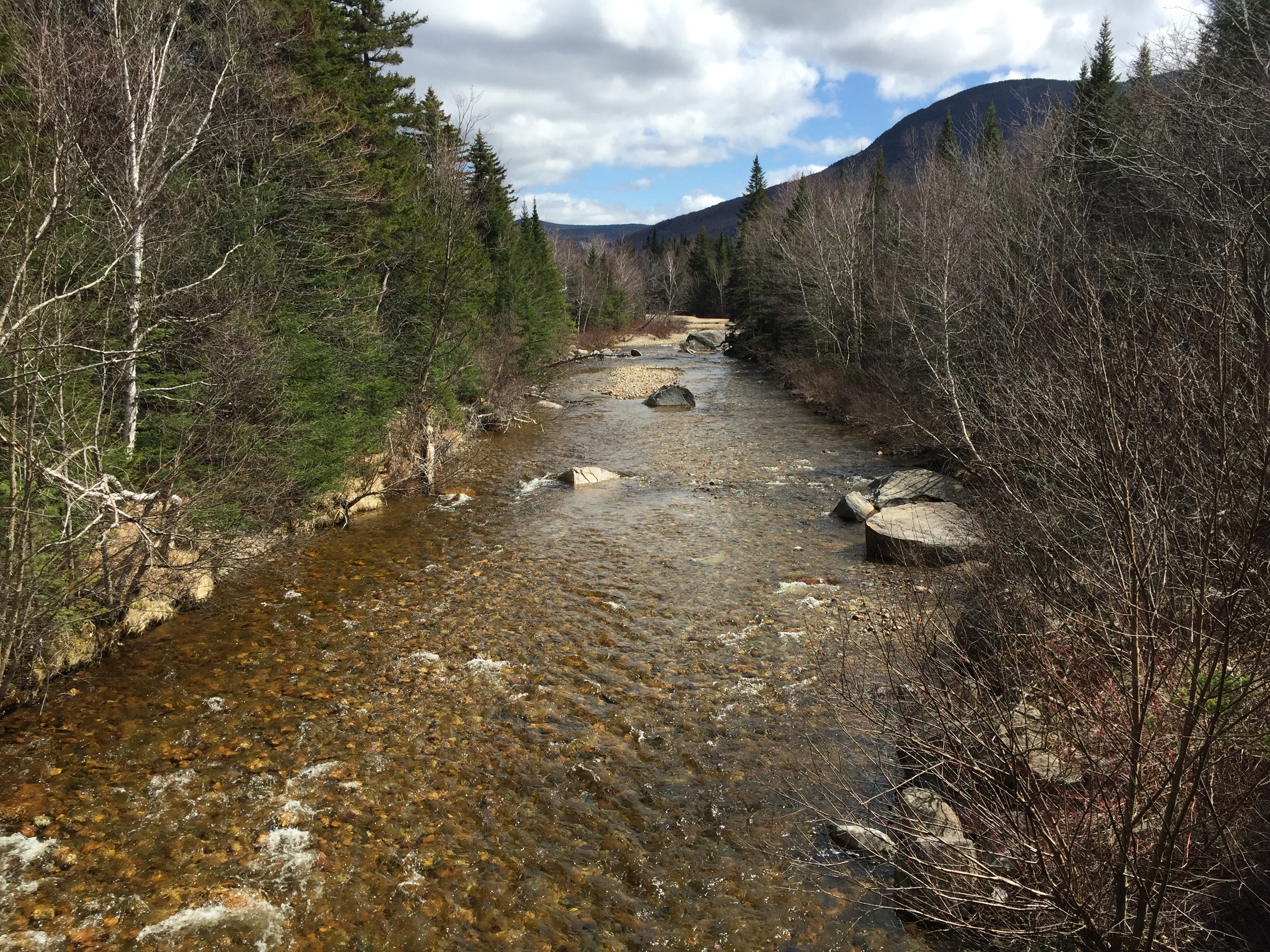
- The Zealand River at Zealand Road

- Location within New Hampshire Location within the United States

Location
- Country: United States
- State: New Hampshire
- Counties: Grafton, Coos
- Towns: Bethlehem, Carroll

Physical characteristics
- Source: Mount Hale
  - location: White Mountain National Forest
  - coordinates: 44°12′15″N 71°30′20″W
  - elevation: 3,120 ft (950 m)
- Mouth: Ammonoosuc River
  - location: Carroll
  - coordinates: 44°16′10″N 71°30′41″W
  - elevation: 1,424 ft (434 m)
- Length: 6.3-mile (10.1 km)

Basin features
- Tributaries
  - left: Hoxie Brook, Hale Brook
  - right: Mount Field Brook, Mount Tom Brook

The Zealand River is a 6.3-mile-long (10.1 km) river in the White Mountains of New Hampshire in the United States. It is a tributary of the Ammonoosuc River and part of the Connecticut River watershed.

The Zealand River rises on the eastern slopes of Mount Hale in the town of Bethlehem, New Hampshire, and drops to the southeast into the center of Zealand Notch, where it turns north. It is paralleled first by the Zealand Trail, a hiking trail, and then by Zealand Road, maintained by the White Mountain National Forest. The river valley separates Mount Hale to the west from Mount Tom to the east. Farther north, the Rosebrook Mountains overlook the river to the east, and the small pegmatite knobs of South, Middle, and North Sugarloaf rise to the west. The river passes the national forest Zealand Campground and reaches the Ammonoosuc River just east of the village of Twin Mountain in the town of Carroll.

== See also ==
- List of rivers of New Hampshire
