= Bethlehem, New Hampshire =

- Town
- Bethlehem, New Hampshire, from the west
- Motto: Star of the White Mountains
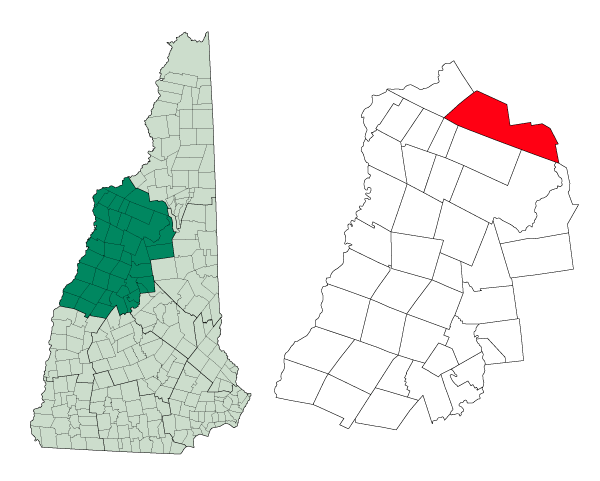
- Location in Grafton County, New Hampshire
- Coordinates: 44°16′49″N 71°41′17″W
- Country: United States
- State: New Hampshire
- County: Grafton
- Incorporated: 1799
- Villages: Bethlehem; Bethlehem Hollow; Maplewood; Pierce Bridge

Area
  - Total: 91.0 sq mi (235.6 km^{2})
  - Land: 90.6 sq mi (234.7 km^{2})
  - Water: 0.35 sq mi (0.9 km^{2}) 0.39%
- Elevation: 1,578 ft (481 m)

Population (2020)
  - Total: 2,484
  - Density: 27/sq mi (10.6/km^{2})
- Time zone: UTC-5 (Eastern)
  - Summer (DST): UTC-4 (Eastern)
- ZIP code: 03574
- Area code: 603
- FIPS code: 33-05460
- GNIS feature ID: 873546
- Website: bethlehemnh.gov

Bethlehem is a hillside town in Grafton County, New Hampshire, United States. The population was 2,484 at the 2020 census. It is home to Cushman and Strawberry Hill state forests. The eastern half of the town is within the White Mountain National Forest. The Appalachian Trail crosses a small portion of the town in the south.

The main village of the town, where 826 people resided at the 2020 census, is defined as the Bethlehem census-designated place (CDP), and is located at the junction of U.S. Route 302 with New Hampshire Route 142. The town also includes the villages of Maplewood and Pierce Bridge.

== History ==
Panoramic Map of Bethlehem in 1883

Granted as "Lloyd's Hills" in 1774 by colonial Governor John Wentworth, the town was named for James Lloyd of Boston. It was the last of the provincial grants in New Hampshire. In the aftermath of the Revolutionary War, the original grant could not be found. Lack of documentation deterred settlement until 1787, when the first permanent houses were built. Dropping its homage to Lloyd, a Loyalist, the town was incorporated as "Bethlehem" on December 27, 1799, the name having been selected on Christmas Day. There were just 33 families, with agriculture the only industry.

By 1850, the population had grown to 950, and the town contained a gristmill, five large sawmills, and two starch factories. In 1867, the railroad came to Bethlehem Junction. With it traveled tourists from Boston, New York and elsewhere, many to avoid respiratory ailments in the low pollen count environment of "the highest town in New Hampshire" (as claimed on a present-day sign in the village). Others were attracted by the paintings of the White Mountain artists. Conveniently located near Mount Washington and other attractions of the White Mountains, Bethlehem developed into a Gilded Age resort for the rich and famous.

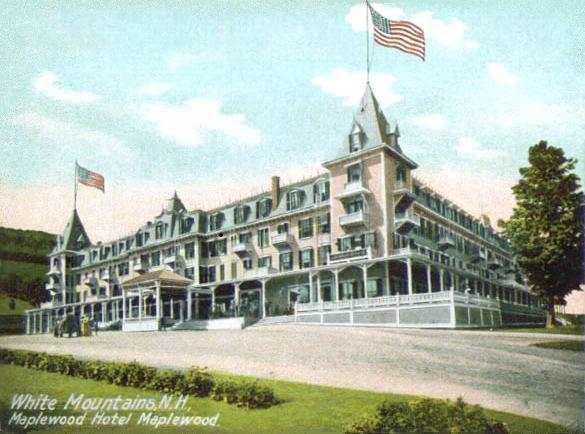
The Maplewood Hotel c. 1905

In 1873, at the beginning of a building boom, Governor Henry Howard of Rhode Island built Howard House. Eventually, over 30 hotels would line Bethlehem's streets. Seven trains arrived daily, some direct from Grand Central Terminal, stopping at Bethlehem's five depots. Patrons included Presidents Grant, Hayes, Roosevelt, Taft and Harding, as well as author Thornton Burgess and poet Robert Frost. Entertainments included strolling Main Street on a two and a half mile raised boardwalk, carriage rides in the countryside, croquet games, or simply lounging about the hotels' sweeping piazzas.

On the hills and thoroughfares were built large summer "cottages", including that of the Woolworth family. Beginning in 1887, an annual Coaching Parade was held, with prizes awarded for lavishly decorated horse-drawn carriages. Ornamentations cost as much as $5,000, prompting visitor Phineas T. Barnum to proclaim it "the Second Greatest Show on Earth."

But the rise of the automobile would bring the decline of grand hotels. Tourists could now explore regions beyond the limits of rail service. Beginning about 1916, Jewish families began arriving in town, often seeking relief from hay fever symptoms. In fact, an organization named the Hebrew Hay Fever Relief Association, which was organized in the 1920s, existed in Bethlehem for many years. For a town in northern New Hampshire, contemporary Bethlehem has a sizeable Jewish community (and a number of synagogues), a legacy of its hay-fever-relief experience.

It was at Bethlehem that the National Hay Fever Relief Association was founded. World War II gave the hotels a second life, as tourists avoided war-ravaged Europe and stayed closer to home. By the 1950s, however, hotel attendance had dwindled. Many would close and be demolished. Today, the town is known for its special Christmas postal cancellation stamp. Every year, people from all over the world send Christmas cards to the Bethlehem post office to have them postmarked. In 2000, it handled 56,000 Christmas cards.

Bethlehem has experienced a continuing controversy, beginning in the 1980s. Casella Waste Systems of Rutland, Vermont, through its subsidiary North Country Environmental Services, purchased the town dump and created a landfill. The company has made efforts to expand the landfill. Town residents have tried to terminate the landfill, but Casella has repeatedly challenged the residents in court.

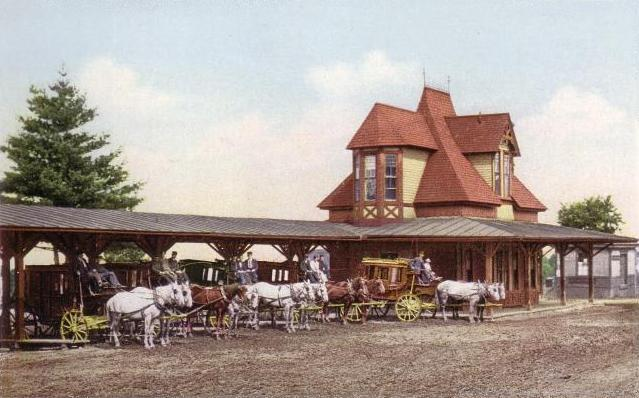
Railway Station c. 1905

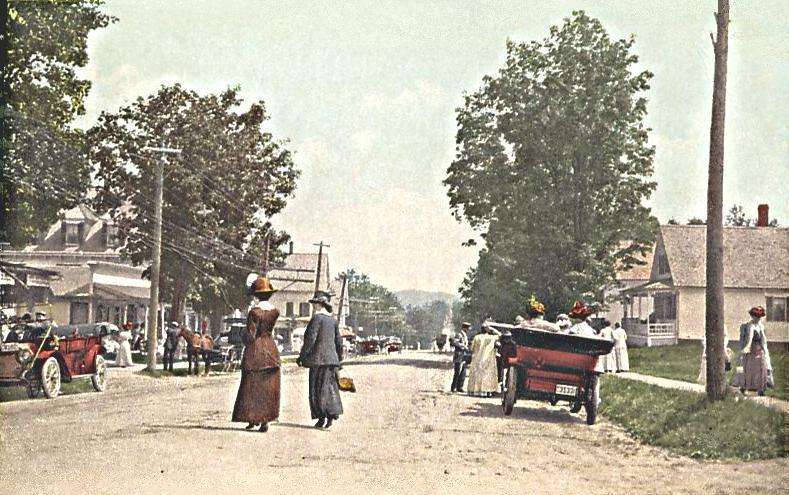
Main Street in 1919

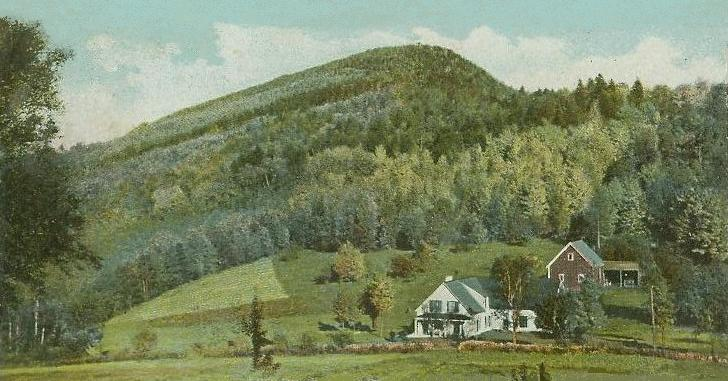
Mount Agassiz in 1906

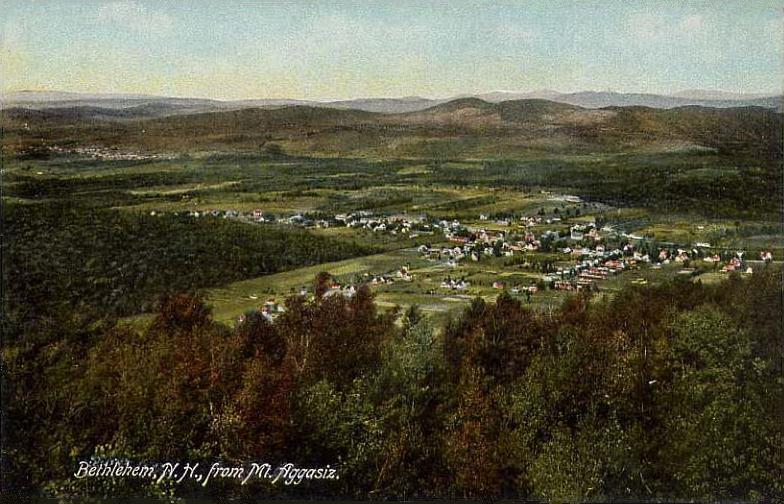
Bird's-eye view in 1909

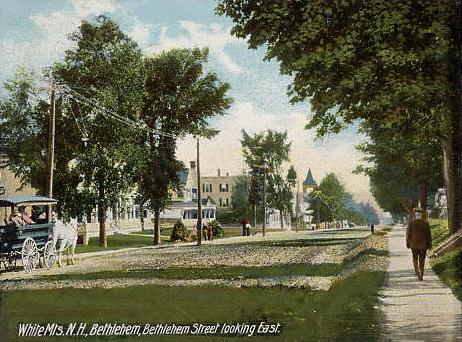
Horse Trolley on Main Street, Bethlehem; from a 1907 postcard

== Geography and climate ==
According to the United States Census Bureau, the town has a total area of 91.0 square miles (235.6 km^{2}), of which 90.6 square miles (234.7 km^{2}) are land and 0.3 square miles (0.9 km^{2}) are water, comprising 0.39% of the town. Bethlehem is drained by the Ammonoosuc, Gale, Zealand and Little rivers, together with Tuttle, Baker and Haystack brooks. Mount Cleveland, elevation 2,397 feet (731 m), and Mount Agassiz, 2,378 ft (725 m), rise to the south of the center of town. Town boundaries contain several of the famous 4,000-footers of New Hampshire: North Twin Mountain (the highest point in Bethlehem at 4,761 ft (1,451 m)), Mount Hale, Mount Tom, Mount Field, and Mount Willey. Bethlehem lies almost fully within the Connecticut River watershed, though a tiny portion of the southeastern corner of the town is in the Merrimack River watershed, and an even smaller portion on the eastern side of the Willey Range is in the Saco River watershed.

Climate data for Bethlehem 2, NH (1991–2020 normals, extremes 1893–1991)
Month	Jan	Feb	Mar	Apr	May	Jun	Jul	Aug	Sep	Oct	Nov	Dec	Year
Record high °F (°C)	65 (18)	61 (16)	80 (27)	89 (32)	91 (33)	94 (34)	96 (36)	95 (35)	90 (32)	85 (29)	75 (24)	62 (17)	96 (36)
Mean daily maximum °F (°C)	27.8 (−2.3)	30.4 (−0.9)	39.7 (4.3)	53.4 (11.9)	67.4 (19.7)	75.7 (24.3)	80.2 (26.8)	78.8 (26.0)	71.7 (22.1)	58.2 (14.6)	44.7 (7.1)	33.1 (0.6)	55.1 (12.9)
Daily mean °F (°C)	15.6 (−9.1)	17.3 (−8.2)	27.1 (−2.7)	40.4 (4.7)	53.2 (11.8)	61.8 (16.6)	66.4 (19.1)	64.5 (18.1)	56.8 (13.8)	45.3 (7.4)	34.1 (1.2)	22.3 (−5.4)	42.1 (5.6)
Mean daily minimum °F (°C)	3.4 (−15.9)	4.1 (−15.5)	14.4 (−9.8)	27.3 (−2.6)	39.0 (3.9)	47.9 (8.8)	52.7 (11.5)	50.2 (10.1)	42.0 (5.6)	32.4 (0.2)	23.5 (−4.7)	11.6 (−11.3)	29.0 (−1.6)
Record low °F (°C)	−36 (−38)	−34 (−37)	−22 (−30)	−4 (−20)	20 (−7)	28 (−2)	36 (2)	33 (1)	22 (−6)	8 (−13)	−9 (−23)	−34 (−37)	−36 (−38)
Average precipitation inches (mm)	2.59 (66)	2.04 (52)	2.56 (65)	3.15 (80)	3.69 (94)	4.24 (108)	4.63 (118)	4.16 (106)	3.58 (91)	3.97 (101)	3.04 (77)	3.34 (85)	40.99 (1,041)
Average snowfall inches (cm)	21.3 (54)	21.5 (55)	16.7 (42)	5.4 (14)	0.4 (1.0)	0 (0)	0 (0)	0 (0)	0 (0)	1.6 (4.1)	7.1 (18)	26.9 (68)	100.9 (256)
Average precipitation days (≥ 0.01 in)	16.0	12.1	13.8	12.6	15.5	16.6	14.7	13.0	11.4	14.1	13.5	15.7	169.0
Average snowy days (≥ 0.01 in)	12.8	9.8	8.4	3.0	0.2	0	0	0	0	0.9	4.8	11.1	51.0
Source: NOAA / Western Regional Climate Center

== Demographics ==
Historical population
Census	Pop.	Note	%±
1800	171		—
1810	422		146.8%
1820	467		10.7%
1830	665		42.4%
1840	779		17.1%
1850	950		22.0%
1860	896		−5.7%
1870	998		11.4%
1880	1,400		40.3%
1890	1,267		−9.5%
1900	1,261		−0.5%
1910	1,201		−4.8%
1920	866		−27.9%
1930	872		0.7%
1940	935		7.2%
1950	882		−5.7%
1960	898		1.8%
1970	1,142		27.2%
1980	1,784		56.2%
1990	2,033		14.0%
2000	2,199		8.2%
2010	2,526		14.9%
2020	2,484		−1.7%
U.S. Decennial Census

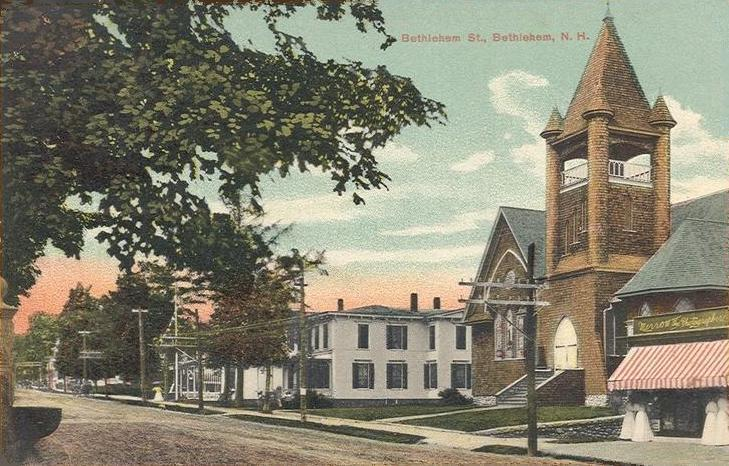
Main Street in 1907

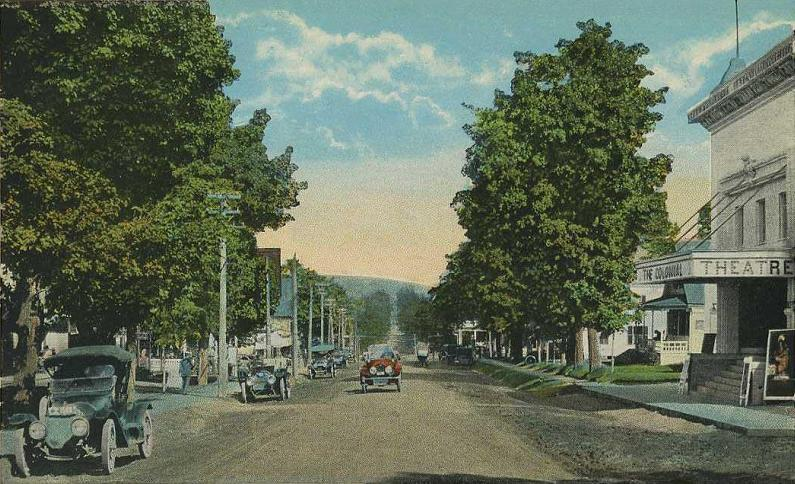
The Colonial Theatre c. 1920

As of the census of 2010, there were 2,526 people, 1,103 households, and 698 families residing in the town. There were 1,517 housing units, of which 414, or 27.3%, were vacant. 305 of the vacant units were for seasonal or recreational use. The racial makeup of the town was 97.2% white, 0.1% African American, 0.5% Native American, 0.6% Asian, 0.04% Native Hawaiian or Pacific Islander, 0.2% some other race, and 1.3% from two or more races. 1.7% of the population were Hispanic or Latino of any race.

Of the 1,103 households, 27.3% had children under the age of 18 living with them, 49.0% were headed by married couples living together, 9.7% had a female householder with no husband present, and 36.7% were non-families. 30.4% of all households were made up of individuals, and 9.4% were someone living alone who was 65 years of age or older. The average household size was 2.27, and the average family size was 2.77.

In the town, 20.9% of the population were under the age of 18, 6.1% were from 18 to 24, 22.2% from 25 to 44, 37.5% from 45 to 64, and 13.4% were 65 years of age or older. The median age was 45.5 years. For every 100 females, there were 102.6 males. For every 100 females age 18 and over, there were 102.1 males.

For the period 2011–2015, the estimated median annual income for a household was $49,329, and the median income for a family was $56,458. Male full-time workers had a median income of $43,447 versus $41,563 for females. The per capita income for the town was $27,853. 19.7% of the population and 15.1% of families were below the poverty line. 29.7% of the population under the age of 18 and 12.0% of those 65 or older were living in poverty.

== Sites of interest ==
- Bethlehem Heritage Society Museum
- The Colonial Theatre
- The Rocks Estate
