= Chandler's Purchase, New Hampshire =

Township in Coos County, New Hampshire, United States

- Township
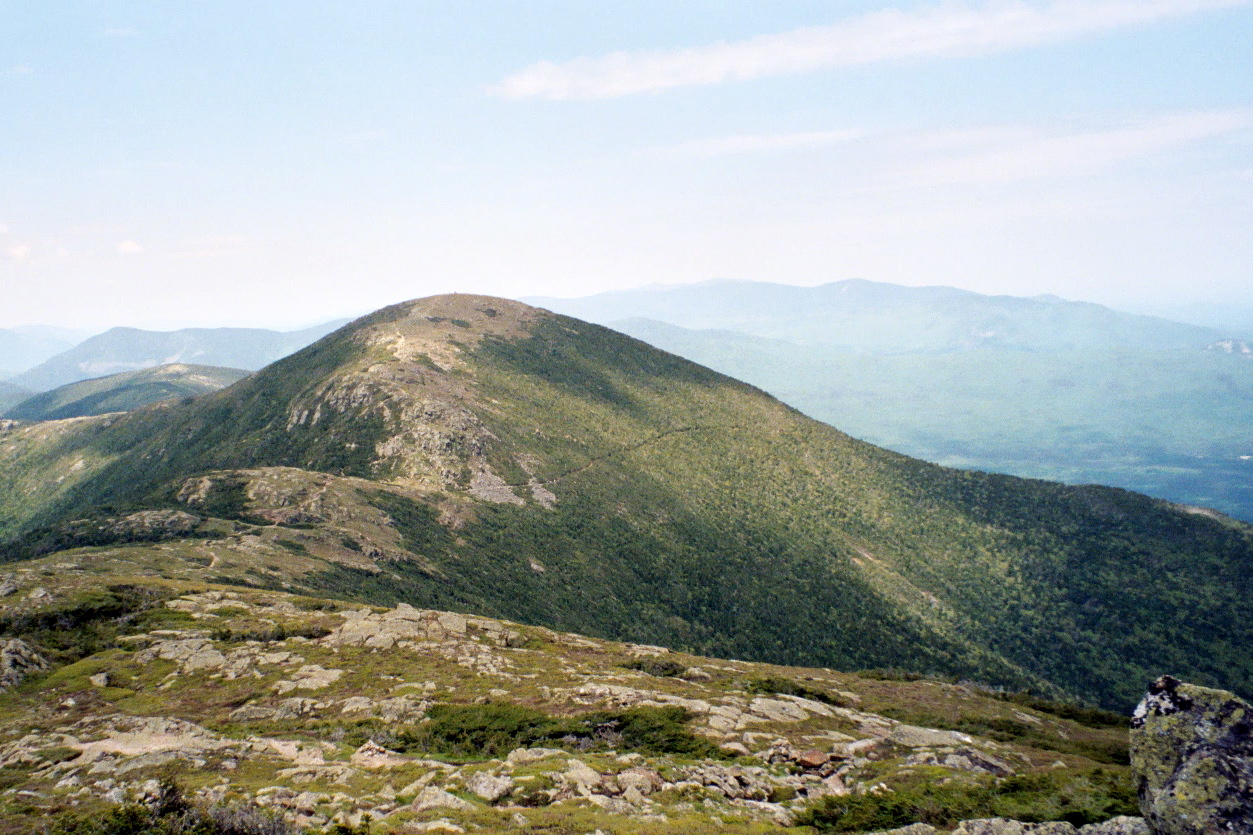
- Mount Eisenhower, June 2006

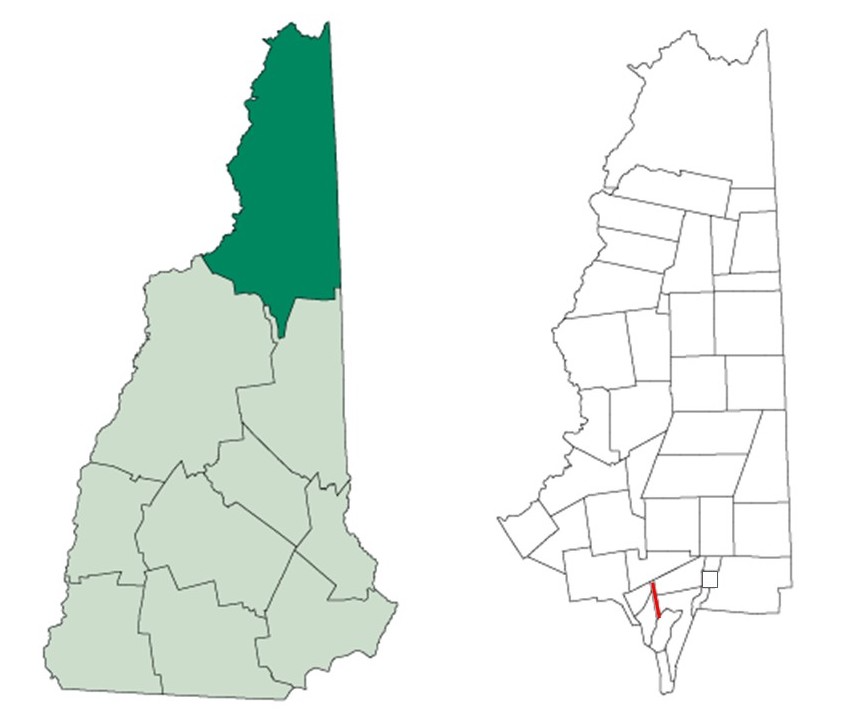
- Location in Coös County, New Hampshire
- Coordinates: 44°15′47″N 71°21′31″W
- Country: United States
- State: New Hampshire
- County: Coös

Area
  - Total: 2.1 sq mi (5.5 km^{2})
  - Land: 2.1 sq mi (5.5 km^{2})
  - Water: 0 sq mi (0 km^{2}) 0%
- Elevation: 2,600 ft (800 m)

Population (2020)
  - Total: 0
- Time zone: UTC-5 (Eastern)
  - Summer (DST): UTC-4 (Eastern)
- Area code: 603
- FIPS code: 33-007-11220

Chandler's Purchase is a township located in Coös County, New Hampshire, United States. The purchase lies entirely within the White Mountain National Forest. As of the 2020 census, the purchase had a population of zero, and was also estimated to be 0 in 2025. It is the smallest township by area in Coos County.

In New Hampshire, locations, grants, townships (which are different from towns), and purchases are unincorporated portions of a county which are not part of any town and have limited self-government (if any, as many are uninhabited).

== History ==
Chandler's Purchase is named for Jeremiah Chandler of Conway, who purchased about 10,000 acres (40 km^{2}) from commissioner James Willey in 1835 for $300.

== Geography ==
According to the United States Census Bureau, the purchase has a total area of 2.1 square miles (5.5 km^{2}), all land, other than by streams such as the Ammonoosuc River, which flows through the purchase. The highest point is the summit of Mount Eisenhower, at 4,780 feet (1,460 m) above sea level.

Two roads cross the purchase. Base Station Road leads east to the Marshfield Base Station of the Mount Washington Cog Railway in neighboring Thompson and Meserve's Purchase and west to Bretton Woods. The hiker parking lot for the Jewell Trail and the Ammonoosuc Ravine Trail, both of which afford access to the summit of Mount Washington, is along the road in Chandler's Purchase. The second road in the purchase, Jefferson Notch Road, is a dirt road which leads north from Base Station Road over Jefferson Notch to the Israel River valley in the town of Jefferson.

=== Adjacent municipalities ===
- Low and Burbank's Grant (north)
- Thompson and Meserve's Purchase (northeast)
- Sargent's Purchase (east)
- Cutt's Grant (southeast)
- Bean's Grant (west)
- Crawford's Purchase (northwest)

== Demographics ==
Historical population
| Census | Pop. | Note | %± |
|---|---|---|---|
| 1890 | 15 | | — |
| 1960 | 0 | | — |
| 1970 | 0 | | — |
| 1980 | 0 | | — |
| 1990 | 0 | | — |
| 2000 | 0 | | — |
| 2010 | 0 | | — |
| 2020 | 0 | | — |
U.S. Decennial Census

As of the 2020 census, there were no people living in the purchase.
