= Crawford's Purchase, New Hampshire =

Township in Coos County, New Hampshire, United States

- Township
- Upper Falls of the Ammonoosuc River

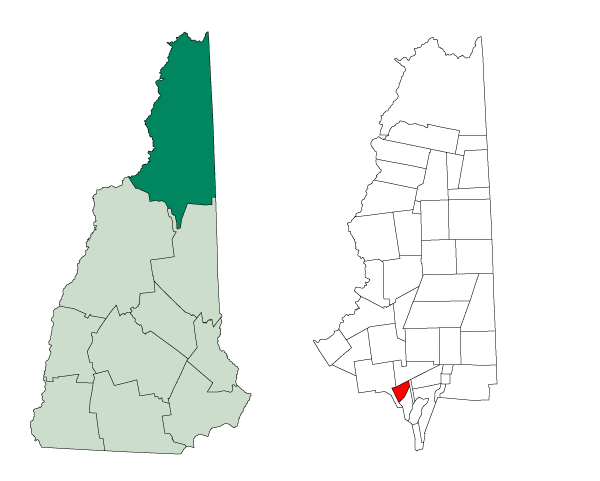
- Location in Coös County, New Hampshire
- Coordinates: 44°15′41″N 71°24′9″W
- Country: United States
- State: New Hampshire
- County: Coös

Area
  - Total: 8.2 sq mi (21.2 km^{2})
  - Land: 8.2 sq mi (21.2 km^{2})
  - Water: 0 sq mi (0 km^{2}) 0%
- Elevation: 1,860 ft (567 m)

Population (2020)
  - Total: 0
- Time zone: UTC-5 (Eastern)
  - Summer (DST): UTC-4 (Eastern)
- Area code: 603
- FIPS code: 33-007-16100

Crawford's Purchase is a township in Coös County, New Hampshire, United States. The purchase lies entirely within the White Mountain National Forest. As of the 2020 census, the purchase had a population of zero and was estimated to also be zero in 2025.

In New Hampshire, locations, grants, townships (which are different from towns), and purchases are unincorporated portions of a county which are not part of any town and have limited self-government (if any, as many are uninhabited).

== History ==
Crawford's Purchase was granted by commissioner James Willey to Thomas Abbott, Nathaniel Abbott and Ethan Allen Crawford in 1834 for $8,000, and contained about 15,712 acres (63.58 km^{2}).

== Geography ==
According to the United States Census Bureau, the purchase has a total area of 8.2 square miles (21.2 km^{2}), all land, except for streams such as the Ammonoosuc River, which flows across the purchase from east to west. The highest point is 2,890 feet (880 m) above sea level, on the southern slopes of the Dartmouth Range, at the northern corner of the purchase boundary.

=== Adjacent municipalities ===
- Low and Burbank's Grant (north)
- Chandler's Purchase (northeast)
- Bean's Grant (east)
- Carroll (west)

== Demographics ==
Historical population
| Census | Pop. | Note | %± |
|---|---|---|---|
| 1880 | 28 | | — |
| 1890 | 28 | | 0.0% |
| 1900 | 10 | | −64.3% |
| 1960 | 0 | | — |
| 1970 | 0 | | — |
| 1980 | 0 | | — |
| 1990 | 0 | | — |
| 2000 | 0 | | — |
| 2010 | 0 | | — |
| 2020 | 0 | | — |
U.S. Decennial Census

As of the 2020 census, there were no people living in the purchase.
