= Bean's Grant, New Hampshire =

Township in Coos County, New Hampshire, United States

- Township
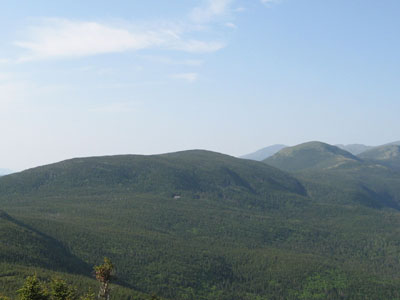
- View of Mount Pierce

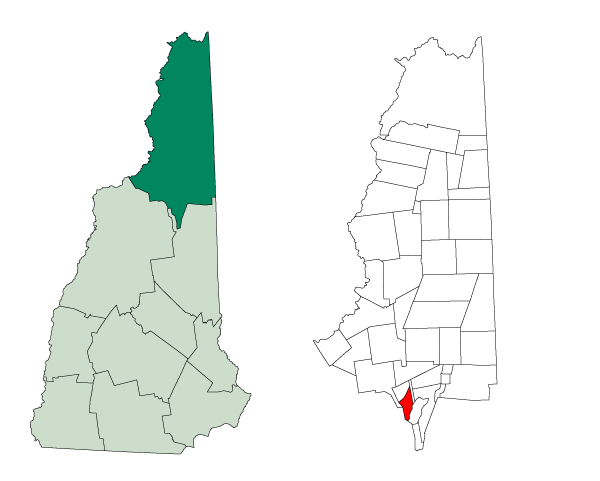
- Location in Coös County, New Hampshire
- Coordinates: 44°13′56″N 71°22′49″W
- Country: United States
- State: New Hampshire
- County: Coös

Area
  - Total: 9.7 sq mi (25.0 km^{2})
  - Land: 9.7 sq mi (25.0 km^{2})
  - Water: 0 sq mi (0 km^{2}) 0%
- Elevation: 3,040 ft (930 m)

Population (2020)
  - Total: 0
- Time zone: UTC-5 (Eastern)
  - Summer (DST): UTC-4 (Eastern)
- Area code: 603
- FIPS code: 33-007-04100

Bean's Grant is a township in southern Coös County, New Hampshire, United States, north of Crawford Notch State Park. The grant lies entirely within the White Mountain National Forest. The population was zero as of the 2020 census and was also estimated to be zero in 2025.

In New Hampshire, locations, grants, townships (which are different from towns), and purchases are unincorporated portions of a county which are not part of any town and have limited self-government (if any, as many are uninhabited).

== History ==
In 1851, the New Hampshire state legislature authorized the governor and council to appoint a land commissioner to sell the public lands, and James Willey of Conway was appointed to that office. Bean's Grant was made by Commissioner Willey to Charles Bean of Maine in 1855, and it contained about 3,300 acres (13 km^{2}).

== Geography ==
According to the United States Census Bureau, the location has a total area of 9.7 square miles (25 km^{2}), all land.

Bean's Grant is bordered to the east by Chandler's Purchase, to the southeast by Cutt's Grant, to the southwest by Hart's Location and Carroll, and to the northwest by Crawford's Purchase.

The only roadway in the grant is Base Road, running from the Jefferson Notch Road (a small section of which is also in the Grant) to the nearby Cog Railway at Marshfield Station, to the east.

Many mountains of the Presidential Range are located here, including Mount Pierce, Mount Jackson and Mount Webster, each of which is traversed by the Appalachian Trail. The summit of Mount Pierce is the highest point in Bean's Grant, measuring 4,310 feet (1,310 m) above sea level. Brooks in the grant drain east to the Saco River or west to the Ammonoosuc River. Several popular hiking trails to the Presidential Range, including the Crawford Path, traverse the grant, originating near Saco Lake or further south in Crawford Notch.

=== Adjacent municipalities ===
- Chandler's Purchase (northeast)
- Cutt's Grant (southeast)
- Hart's Location (southwest)
- Carroll (west)
- Crawford's Purchase (northwest)

== Demographics ==
Historical population
Census	Pop.	Note	%±
1960	0		—
1970	0		—
1980	0		—
1990	0		—
2000	0		—
2010	0		—
2020	0		—
U.S. Decennial Census

As of the 2020 census, there were no people living in the location. There are seasonal residents at the AMC hut at Mizpah Spring, along the Appalachian Trail.
