= Mount Agassiz (New Hampshire) =

Mountain in Grafton County, New Hampshire, United States

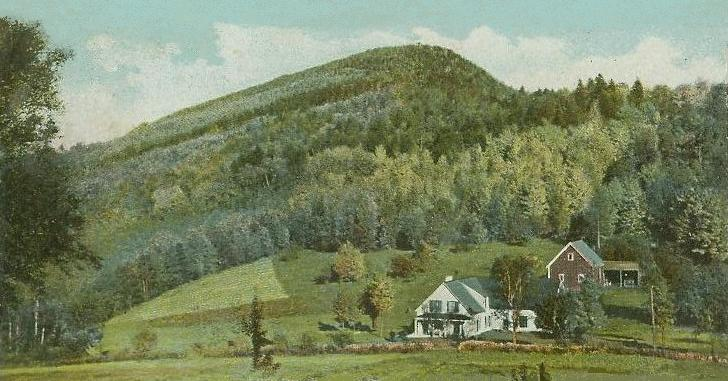
- Mount Agassiz on a 1906 postcard

Highest point
- Elevation: 2,378 ft (725 m) NAVD 88
- Prominence: 341 ft (104 m)
- Coordinates: 44°15′58″N 71°40′36″W

Geography
- Location within New Hampshire
- Location: Bethlehem, New Hampshire, U.S.
- Parent range: White Mountains

Mount Agassiz is a peak in the White Mountains of New Hampshire with an elevation of 2,378 feet (725 m). It is located in the town of Bethlehem in Grafton County. Originally named Peaked Hill, it is named in honor of Louis Agassiz.

An observation tower was built at the summit by 1877, and an auto road was opened circa 1932. Prior to construction of the auto road, an automobile first reached the summit in 1926, via a carriage road, due to a misunderstanding by the driver. A ski trail was cut in 1936–37, with a rope tow added three seasons later; the rope tow operated into the 1980s. In the mid-1950s, the auto road was rebuilt and a snack bar was added at the summit area. Plans during the early 1960s to greatly expand the ski area, including construction of a monorail, never materialized.

The property is privately owned; the current owner does not prohibit hikers.
