= Cutt's Grant, New Hampshire =

Township in Coos County, New Hampshire, United States

- Township
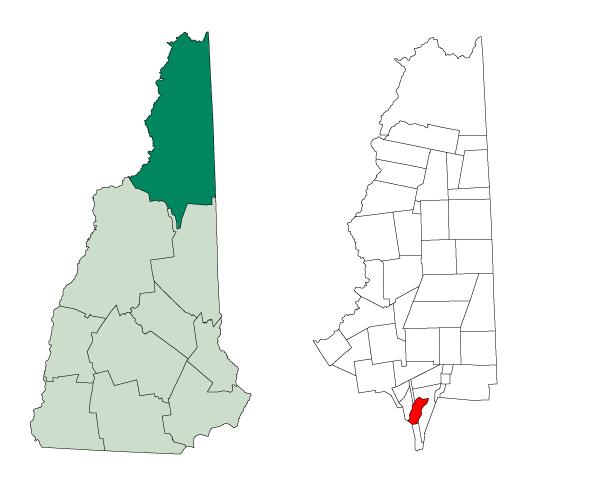
- Location in Coös County, New Hampshire
- Coordinates: 44°12′24″N 71°20′15″W
- Country: United States
- State: New Hampshire
- County: Coös

Area
  - Total: 11.3 sq mi (29.2 km^{2})
  - Land: 11.3 sq mi (29.2 km^{2})
  - Water: 0 sq mi (0 km^{2}) 0%
- Elevation: 2,560 ft (780 m)

Population (2010)
  - Total: 0
- Time zone: UTC-5 (Eastern)
  - Summer (DST): UTC-4 (Eastern)
- Area code: 603
- FIPS code: 33-007-16660

Cutt's Grant is a township in Coös County, New Hampshire, United States. The grant lies entirely within the White Mountain National Forest. As of the 2020 census, the grant had a population of zero and was also estimated to be zero in 2025.

In New Hampshire, locations, grants, townships (which are different from towns), and purchases are unincorporated portions of a county which are not part of any town and have limited self-government (if any, as many are uninhabited).

== History ==
The township is named after Thomas Cutts of Maine, who received a land grant from the New Hampshire state legislature in 1810.

== Geography ==
According to the United States Census Bureau, the grant has a total area of 11.3 square miles (29.3 km^{2}), all land other than streams. The grant encompasses the valley of the Dry River, a south-flowing tributary of the Saco River. The east and west boundaries roughly parallel the river, each approximately one mile distant. The Dry River enters the valley of the Saco River in Crawford Notch at the southern end of the township, and the northern end is below Oakes Gulf on the southern slopes of Mount Washington. The highest point in Cutt's Grant is its northeastern corner, located just south of Gulf Peak on a southeast spur of Mount Washington, where the elevation reaches 4,720 feet (1,440 m) above sea level.

=== Adjacent municipalities ===
- Sargent's Purchase (east)
- Hadley's Purchase (south)
- Hart's Location (southwest)
- Bean's Grant (west)
- Chandler's Purchase (northwest)

== Demographics ==
Historical population
Census	Pop.	Note	%±
1960	0		—
1970	0		—
1980	0		—
1990	0		—
2000	0		—
2010	0		—
2020	0		—
U.S. Decennial Census

As of the 2020 census, there were no people living in the grant.
