= Mount Hale (New Hampshire) =

Mountain in United States of America

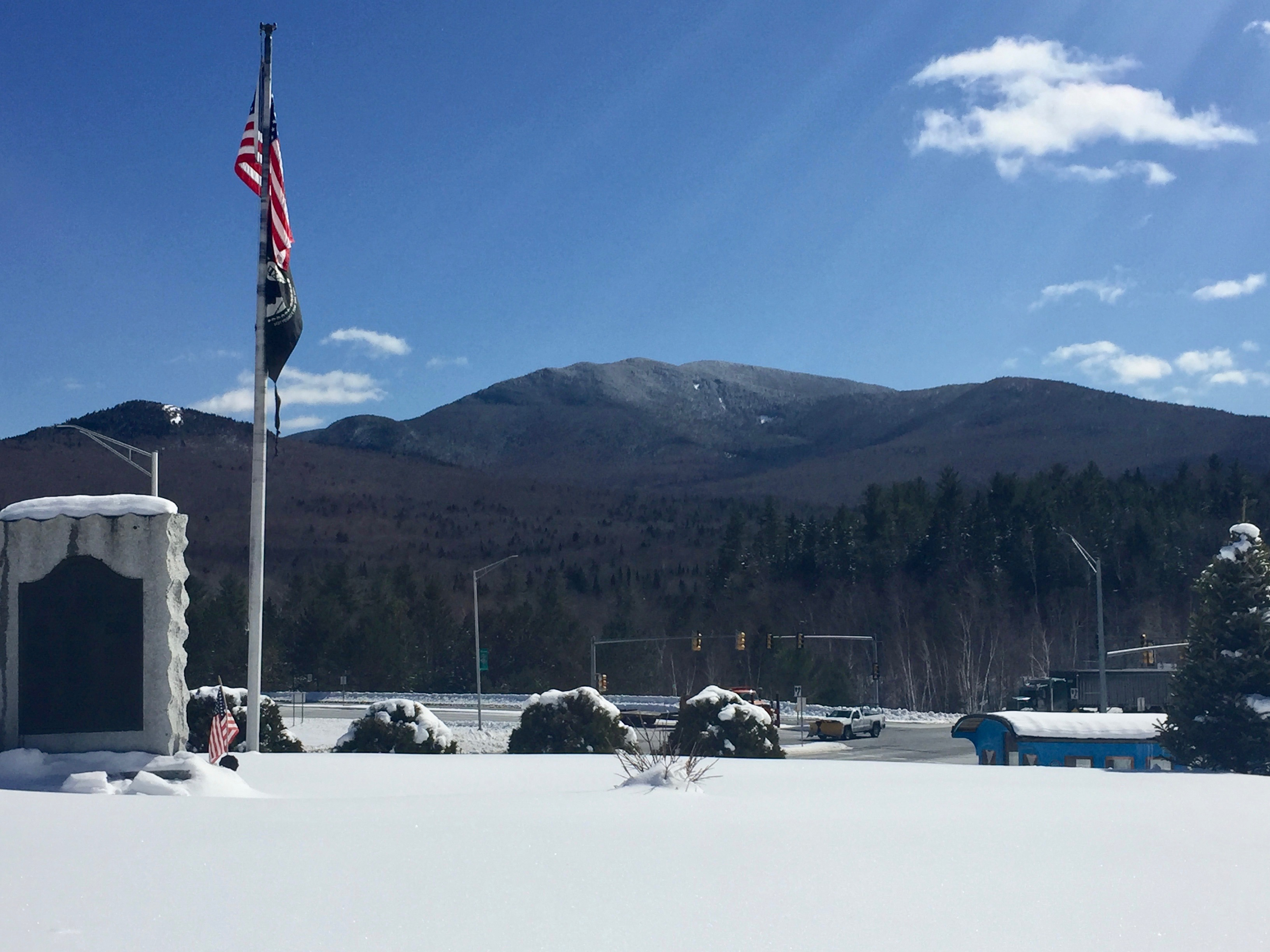
- View of Mt. Hale from village of Twin Mountain

Highest point
- Elevation: 4,054 ft (1,236 m)
- Prominence: 614 ft (187 m)
- Listing: White Mountain 4000-Footers
- Coordinates: 44°13′18″N 71°30′43″W

Geography
- Location: Grafton County, New Hampshire, U.S.
- Parent range: Twin Range
- Topo map: USGS South Twin Mountain

Mount Hale is a mountain located in Grafton County, New Hampshire. The mountain is named after Reverend Edward Everett Hale (1822–1909), and is part of the Twin Range of the White Mountains. The western and eastern sides of Mount Hale are drained by the Little River and Zealand River respectively, and thence into the Ammonoosuc River, Connecticut River, and into Long Island Sound in Connecticut.

A major hiking trail over its peak leads to the Zealand Falls Hut, which is 2.8 miles (4.5 km) away.

== See also ==
- List of mountains in New Hampshire
- White Mountain National Forest
