= Twin Range =

Mountain range in the state of New Hampshire

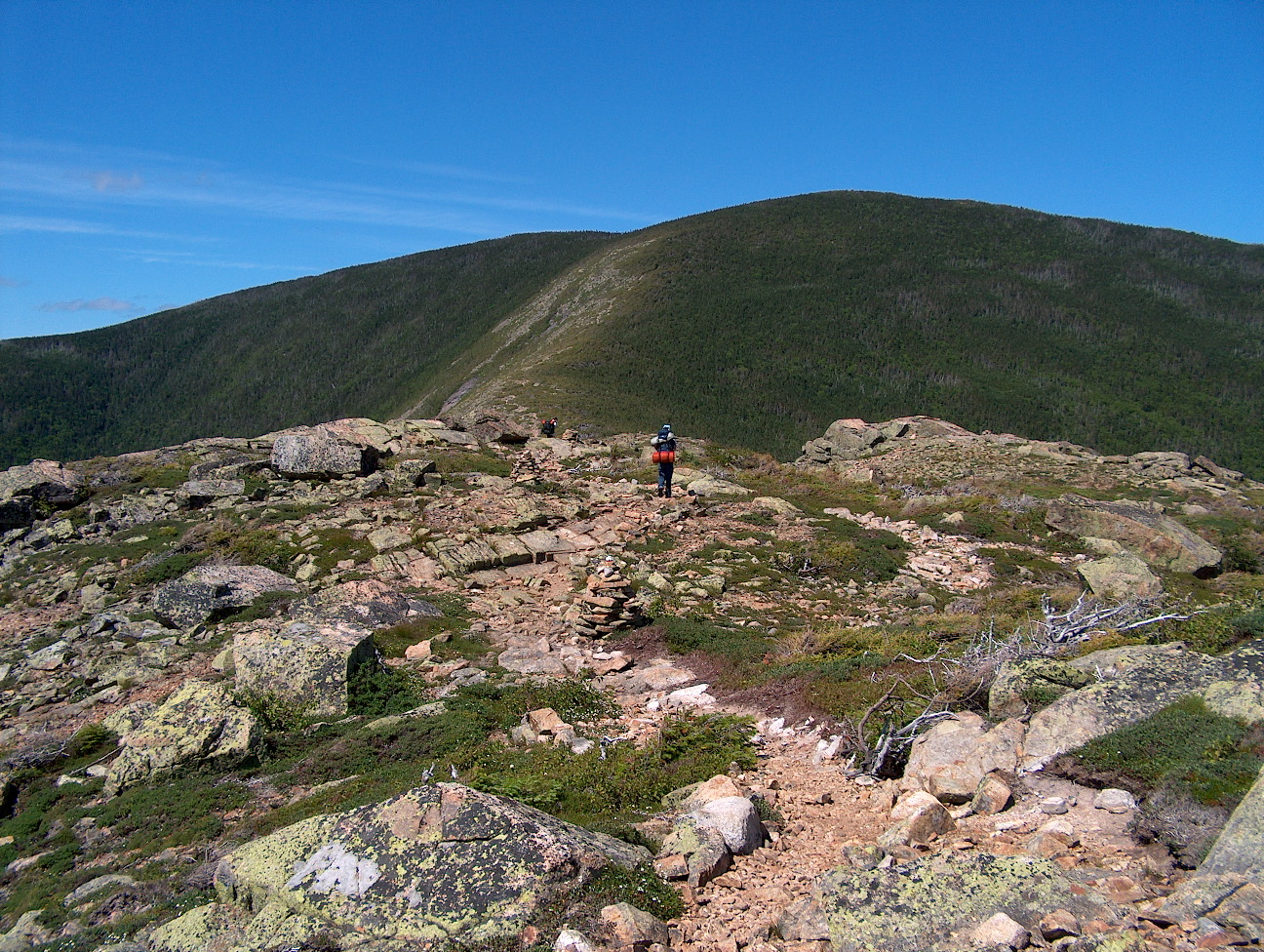
- Mount Bond from the Bondcliff ridge

Highest point
- Peak: South Twin Mountain
- Elevation: 4,902 ft (1,494 m)
- Coordinates: 44°11′14″N 71°33′16″W

Geography
- Country: United States
- State: New Hampshire
- Parent range: White Mountains, Appalachian Mountains
- Borders on: Franconia Range and Willey Range

The Twin Range is a mountain range within the White Mountains of New Hampshire.

== Summits ==
Notable peaks within the range include North Twin Mountain, South Twin Mountain, Mount Guyot, Mount Bond, Mount Garfield, Zealand Mountain, and Mount Hale.

== Borders ==
The range (except for Mt. Hale) approximates the shape of a cross, with its main axis running north–south from North Twin to Bondcliff, and a shorter axis running west–east from Mount Garfield to Zeacliff. To the north of North Twin (and some smaller peaks such as The Nubble) lies the Ammonoosuc River valley. South of Bondcliff lies the valley of the East Branch of the Pemigewasset River. West of Garfield, a ridge joins the Twin Range to the Franconia Range (specifically, the north peak of Mount Lafayette). East of Zeacliff lies Zealand Notch. Mount Hale and the Sugarloafs form a second north–south ridge to the east of the main ridge and north of Zealand Mountain.

== Features ==
The Twin Range offers a chance to enjoy above-treeline hiking in the Whites without being as crowded as the Presidential or Franconia ranges, thanks to a paucity of roads bordering the Pemigewasset Wilderness where most of its peaks are situated.

== Hiking ==
The Appalachian Trail passes across the Twin Range from Garfield to Zeacliff. Other trails connect the other peaks to the A.T. and to roads to the north and south. The Twin Range also contains about half of the Pemi Loop.
