= North Twin Mountain (New Hampshire) =

Mountain in New Hampshire, United States

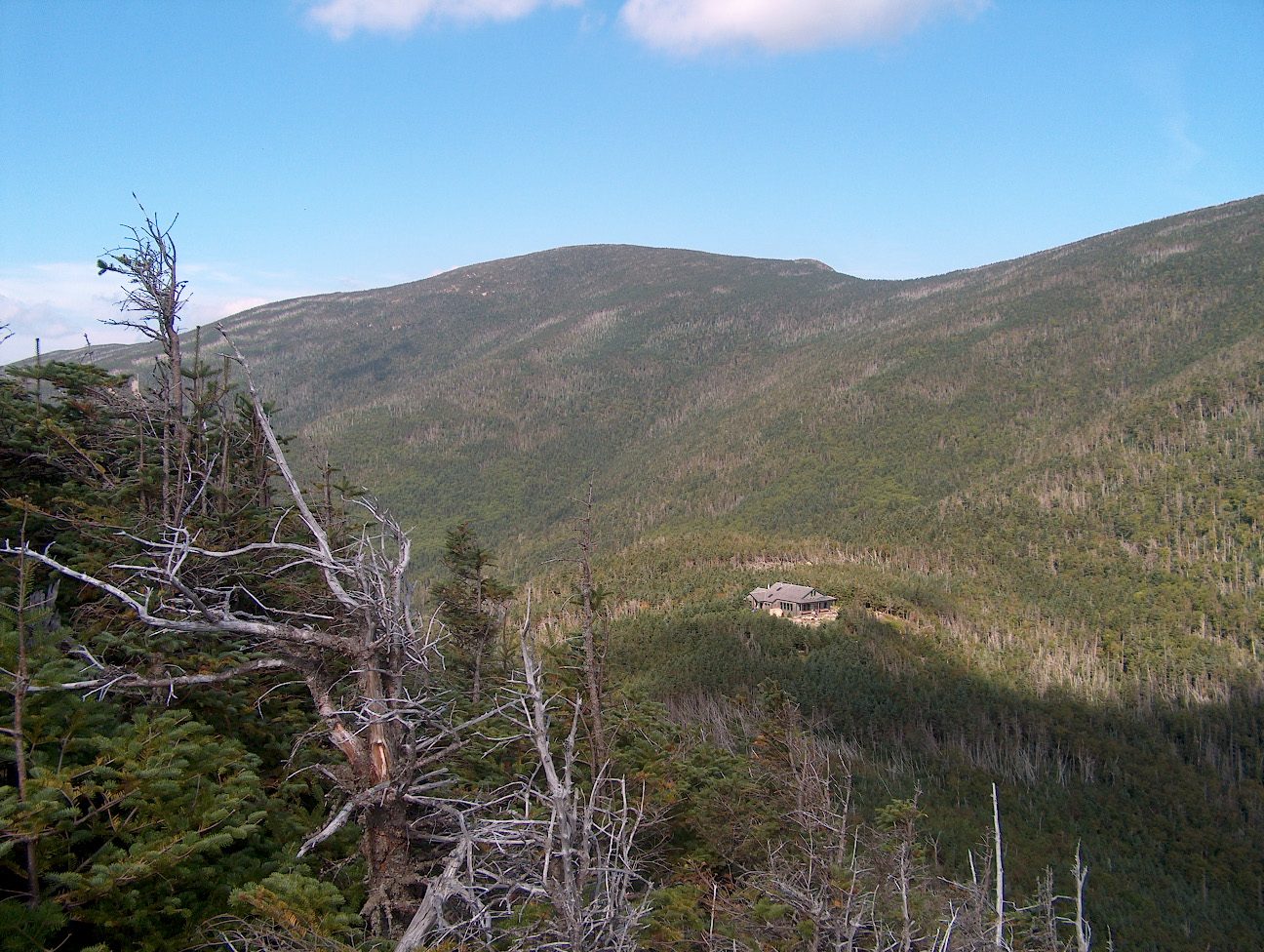
- North Twin Mountain from Galehead Mountain

Highest point
- Elevation: 1,451 m (4,760 ft)
- Prominence: 91 m (299 ft)
- Listing: White Mountain 4000-Footers
- Coordinates: 44°12.14′N 71°33.5′W

Geography
- Location: Grafton County, New Hampshire, U.S.
- Parent range: Twin Range
- Topo map: USGS South Twin Mountain

North Twin Mountain is a mountain located in Grafton County, New Hampshire. The mountain forms the north end of the Twin Range of the White Mountains. North Twin overlooks the village of Twin Mountain, lying to the north of the mountain at the intersection of US Routes 3 and 302. The summit of South Twin Mountain is approximately one mile to the south of North Twin.

The north and east faces of North Twin drain into the Little River, thence into the Ammonoosuc and Connecticut Rivers, and into Long Island Sound in Connecticut. The west side of North Twin drains to the North Branch of the Gale River, another tributary of the Ammonoosuc River.

The summit of North Twin is reached by the North Twin Trail, which ascends from the village of Twin Mountain via the Little River valley. The North Twin Trail continues south along the crest of the Twin Range to South Twin.

== See also ==
- List of mountains in New Hampshire
- White Mountain National Forest
