= Twin Mountain, New Hampshire =

Unincorporated community in New Hampshire, United States

- Unincorporated community
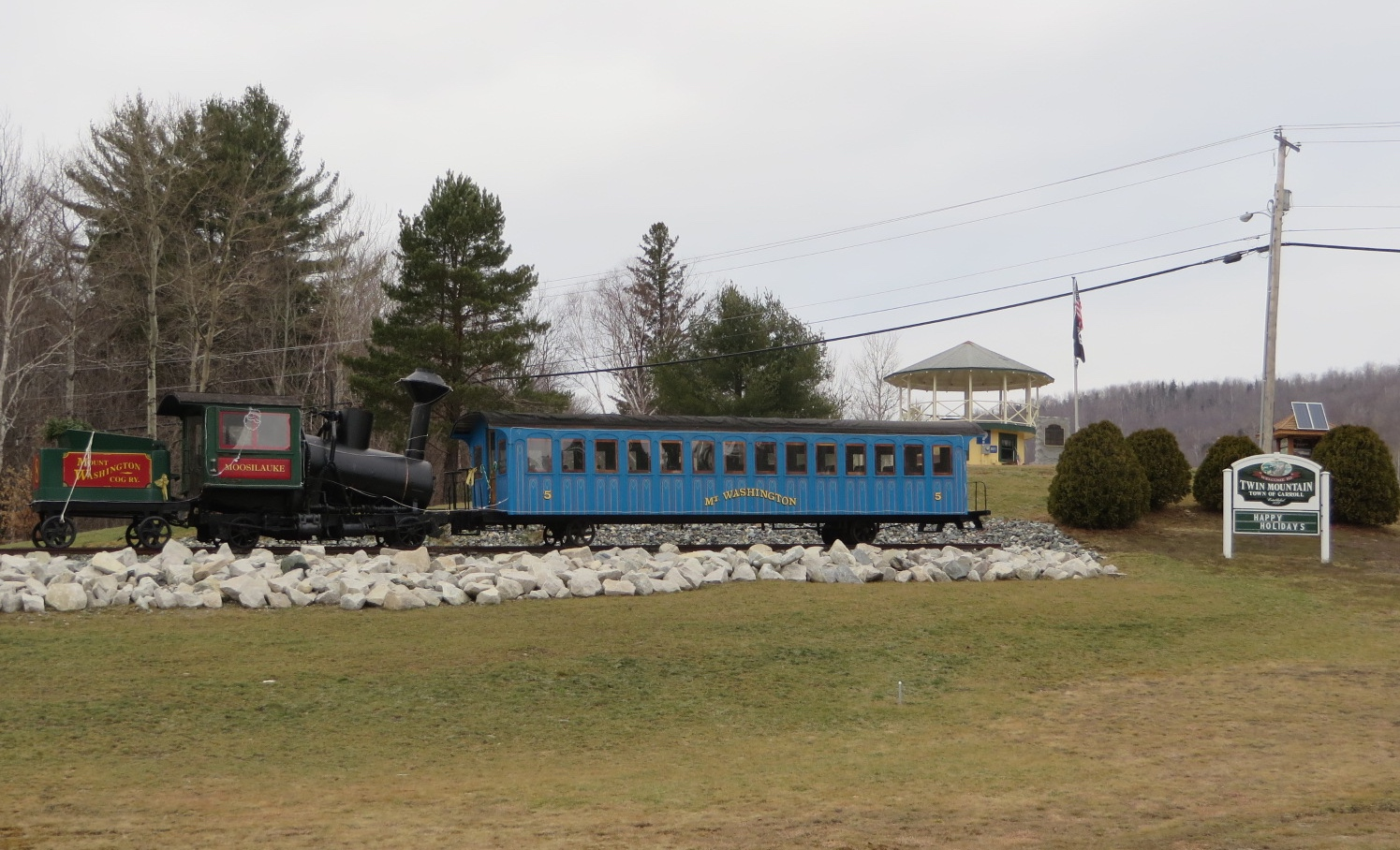
- Mount Washington Cog Railway display in center of Twin Mountain

- Location within New Hampshire Location within the United States
- Coordinates: 44°16′20″N 71°32′20″W
- Country: United States
- State: New Hampshire
- County: Coos
- Town: Carroll
- Elevation: 1,417 ft (432 m)
- Time zone: UTC-5 (Eastern (EST))
  - Summer (DST): UTC-4 (EDT)
- ZIP code: 03595
- Area code: 603
- GNIS feature ID: 870556

Twin Mountain is an unincorporated community in the town of Carroll, New Hampshire, United States. Located in the White Mountains, it is named for two prominent summits which rise to the south of the village: North Twin Mountain (4,761 ft or 1,451 m) and South Twin Mountain (4,902 ft or 1,494 m).

The village is located at the junction of U.S. highways 3 and 302, two major routes through the White Mountain notches. The Ammonoosuc River flows through the center of the village.

Twin Mountain has a separate ZIP Code (03595) from the rest of Carroll.

Twin Mountain Airport lies 1 mile (1.6 km) southwest of the Route 3 / 302 junction. Opened in 1964, it has one runway (headings 9 and 27). Its FAA identifier is 8B2, and its height above sea level is 1,459 feet (445 m). Its area control center is Boston Center, while its flight service station is Bangor, Maine.
