= Ammonoosuc River =

River in New Hampshire, United States

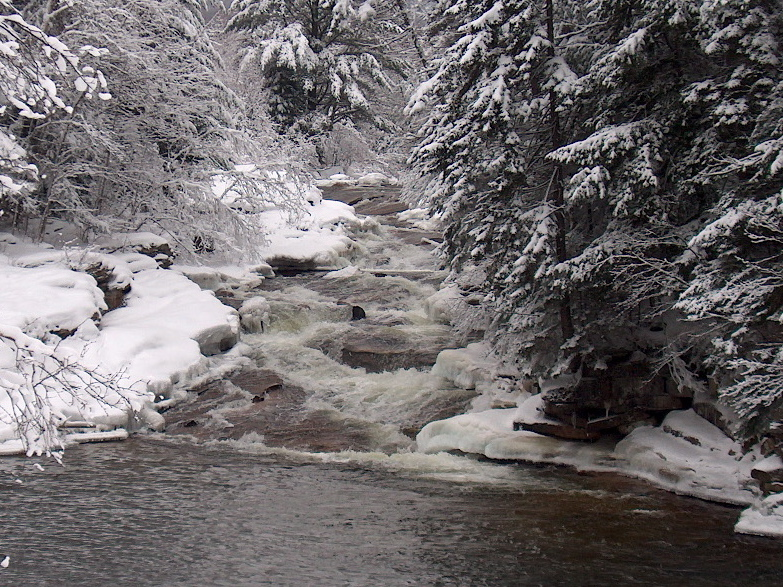
- The Lower Falls of the Ammonoosuc

Location
- Country: United States
- State: New Hampshire
- Counties: Coos, Grafton

Physical characteristics
- Source: Lakes of the Clouds
  - location: Coos County, New Hampshire, United States
  - coordinates: 44°15′31″N 71°19′8″W
  - elevation: 5,025 ft (1,532 m)
- Mouth: Connecticut River
  - location: Woodsville, Grafton County, New Hampshire, United States
  - coordinates: 44°9′19″N 72°2′16″W
  - elevation: 430 ft (130 m)
- Length: 55 mi (89 km)

Basin features
- Tributaries
  - left: Zealand River, Little River, Gale River, Wild Ammonoosuc River

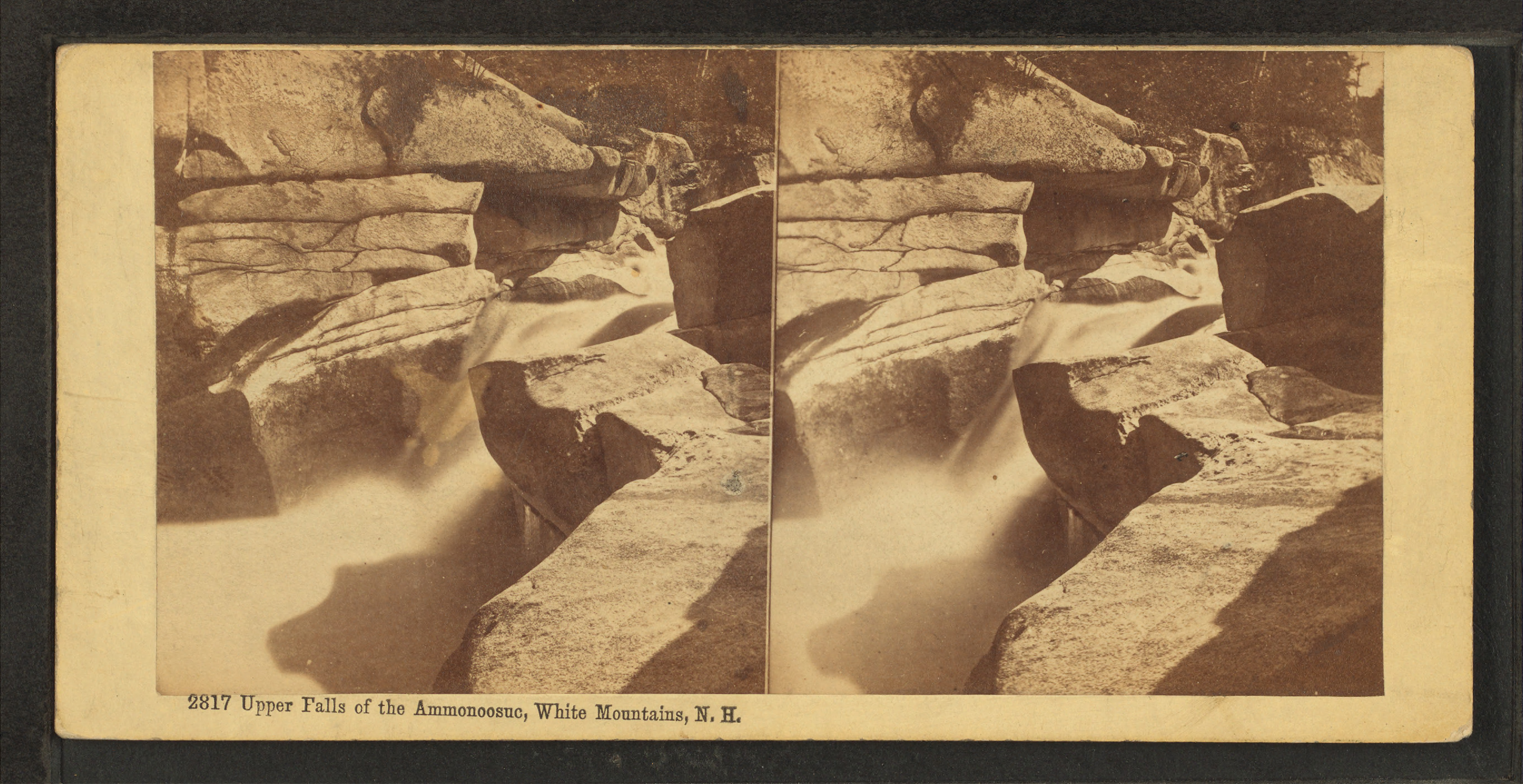
"Upper Falls of the Ammonoosuc, White Mountains, N.H." stereoscopic image by the Bierstadt Brothers

The Ammonoosuc River is a 55-mile-long (89 km) river in northwestern New Hampshire in the United States. It is a tributary of the Connecticut River, which flows to Long Island Sound. Ammonoosuc is Abnaki for "small, narrow fishing place".

The Ammonoosuc rises on the western slope of Mount Washington, in Sargent's Purchase in the White Mountains of southern Coos County. One branch of the river is the outlet of the Lakes of the Clouds in the saddle between Mount Washington and Mount Monroe. Leaving the vicinity of the Presidential Range, the river flows westwardly into Grafton County, where it turns southwestwardly. Along its course the Ammonoosuc passes through Chandler's Purchase, Bean's Grant, and Crawford's Purchase; and the towns of Carroll, Bethlehem, Littleton, Lisbon, Landaff, Bath, and Haverhill to the village of Woodsville, where it flows into the Connecticut River. It collects the Gale River in Lisbon, and the Wild Ammonoosuc River in Bath.

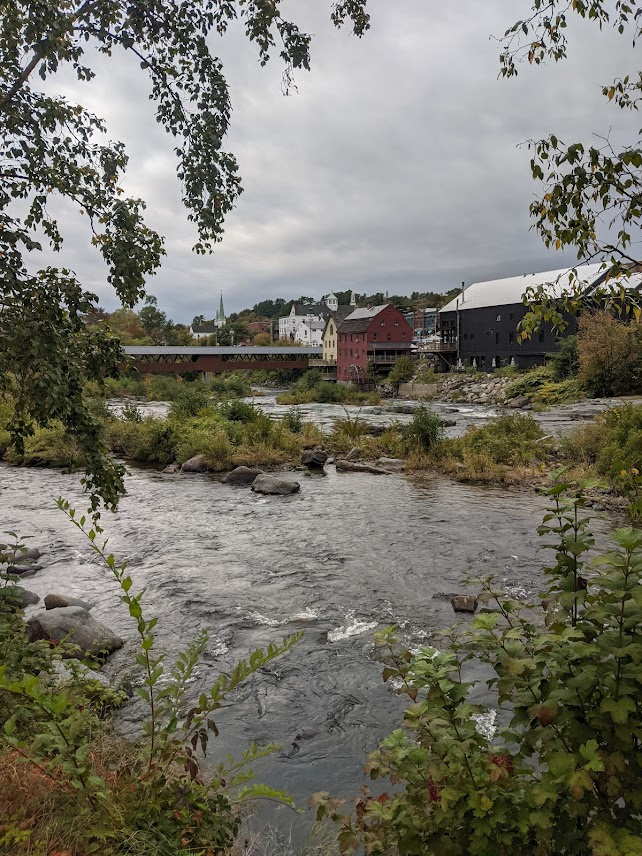
Ammonoosuc River behind downtown Littleton

== Variant names and spellings ==
The United States Board on Geographic Names settled on "Ammonoosuc River" as the stream's name in 1936. According to the Geographic Names Information System, it has also been known as:

- Amminoo Suck River
- Amonoosuck River
- Amonsook River

See also Defunct placenames of New Hampshire.

== See also ==
- List of New Hampshire rivers
- Upper Ammonoosuc River
