= Reach the Beach Relay =

Relay race in New Hampshire, United States

The Reach the Beach Relay is a long distance relay race that is run through the picturesque hills and valleys of New Hampshire at the start of foliage season. It starts from Bretton Woods and ends at Hampton Beach.

The race is currently capped at 425 teams (increased from 300 in 2006) and has filled up for the last several years. Participating teams traditionally come from the New England area, but as the race grows, more teams are signing up from around the country and the world.

== History ==
The relay was started in 1999 by two multisport athletes who wished to bring a multi-day, relay-style race to New England. It is modelled after the grandfather of running relay races, the Hood to Coast relay in Oregon. The first year enjoyed participation by 31 teams, with the first team finishing in 23 hours and the last team in 32. By 2007, there were 351 finishers, and the race size was capped at 350. It sold out on June 14, 2007. In 2008, the race sold out on April 8.

== Course ==
Each year the course undergoes some minor changes, and as such the total distance has increased from around 198 miles (319 km) to around 210 miles (340 km). It is segmented into 36 legs, and is run primarily by 12-person teams. The starts are staggered, starting at 7:30 and ending at 3:00, with the faster teams (based on their applications and history) starting latest. Each team will run their roster for three complete rotations when the race is complete, so the runner in position one runs Legs 1, 13, and 25, runner in position two runs Legs 2, 14, and 26, and so on. Twelve-person teams use two vans, with one van eating and resting (and trying to sleep) while the other van is running its legs. Teams of fewer than 12 are permitted to race, but they must maintain their order. For instance, on an 11-person team the first three runners will have to run four legs each. A team with six or fewer runners is called an Ultra. If a runner is injured during the race and cannot continue, the subsequent runners move down one slot. These rules do not apply to the Freestyle category introduced in 2012. This category allows a team to assign legs to runners however they wish.

Individual legs vary in distance from 2.5 miles (4.0 km) to 9.3 miles (15.0 km), and the total distance for runners varies from 13.9 miles (22.4 km) to 22.5 miles (36.2 km). The first eight legs changed dramatically in 2007 when the start was moved from Bretton Woods to Cannon Mountain, requiring runners to run the significant uphills and downhills of the famous Kancamagus Highway. It was a one-year appearance, however. In 2008 the race course was rerouted north along Interstate 93 to Beaver Brook Wayside Rest Area, which was the starting location of the first two Reach the Beach Relays (1999 and 2000). The new course also passes Bretton Woods Mountain Resort where the race started in the years 2001 through 2006 and included a 5K run up and down the ski slopes.

== Results ==
In 2007, 351 teams finished, with Hello Kitty repeating as champion in a time of 21:12:30 (averaging 6:10 per mile). The 351st team finished in 34:14:47 (after being assessed a 1-hour penalty for vehicle support).

In 2008, a record 356 teams finished. An exciting race for the title developed between defending champion Hello Kitty AC and New Balance Boston, made even more dramatic by Hello Kitty AC losing one runner to injury and New Balance Boston losing two to injury. In the end, New Balance Boston dethroned the repeat champions by a mere 6 minutes with a time of 21:29:34 (6:10 per mile average). The 356th team, Team Brainlab, finished in 35:11:54 (10:05 per mile average).

In 2010, 429 teams completed the event, with newcomer Washed Up NH XC All Stars claiming the top honors finishing in 19:53:31 (averaging 5:42 per mile). The 429th team, 12 Divas Runnin, finished in 37:02:15 (10:37 per mile).

In 2017, 463 teams finished the 202 mile relay from Bretton Woods to Hampton Beach. The first-place finishing team were "The Cutters".

== Weather ==
The race is run on a Friday and Saturday in the middle of September, which generally means cool but comfortable running weather. But with New England weather, one needs to be prepared for extremes. The most feared weather system by the participants is the hurricane. While technically a hurricane has never rolled through New Hampshire on race day, the remnants of three hurricanes (or what felt like hurricanes) were felt in past years.

- Hurricane Isidore in 2002
- Hurricane Ivan in 2004
- Some would argue Hurricane Ophelia in 2005, but a review of the weather maps show that it was just plain old rain that drenched the course.

In 2007, the weather was cool and rain fell on runners off-and-on from about 12:30 on Saturday morning until early late Saturday morning.
