= Charles Alling Gifford =

American architect

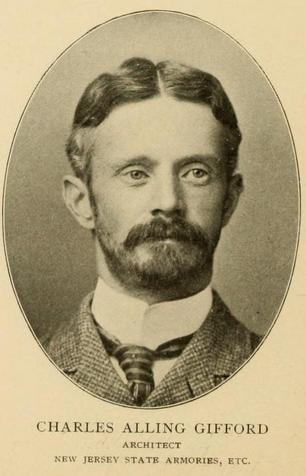
- Born: July 17, 1860; Newark, New Jersey, U.S.
- Died: May 3, 1937 (aged 76); Atlantic City, New Jersey, U.S.
- Education: Stevens Institute of Technology
- Occupation: Architect
- Spouse: Helen M. Conyngham (m. 1890; died 1928)
- Practice: Gifford & Bates
- Buildings: Mount Washington Hotel; Jekyll Island Clubhouse Annex; Old Glynn County Courthouse

Charles Alling Gifford (July 17, 1860 – May 3, 1937) was an American architect and a partner in the New York City firm of Gifford & Bates. He is best remembered for his resort hotels, but also designed houses, churches, and five armories for the New Jersey National Guard.

== Biography ==
The son of John Archer Gifford (1831–1924) and Mary Jane (née Alling) Gifford (1835–1909), Charles Alling Gifford was born in Newark, New Jersey on July 17, 1860. He attended the Latin School in Newark, and graduated in 1881 from the Stevens Institute of Technology in Hoboken, New Jersey.

Gifford worked for the architectural firm of McKim, Meade & White for about three years, before establishing his own firm in Newark. He became a member of the Architectural League of New York in 1881, and an associate of the American Institute of Architects in 1901. By 1889, he had opened an office at 50 Broadway, Manhattan. He formed a partnership with William A. Bates in 1900, an architect who had made a reputation designing houses in Bronxville, New York. In 1903, the offices of Gifford & Bates were located at 18 East 17th Street, Manhattan.

Gifford served in the New Jersey National Guard, 1890–1899, retiring with the rank of Major. He designed National Guard armory buildings for five cities in the state: Jersey City, Paterson, Camden, Newark, and Trenton.

Federal law required able-bodied male college students to undergo military instruction for a state's reserve militia. Gifford designed a Colonial Revival armory/gymnasium for Rutgers College, the gift of brewer John Holme Ballantine:

A generous Trustee of the College has during the past year provided a superbly appointed drill-room and armory. This drill-room affords an unobstructed space 100 by 60 feet, to which is added a large equipment-room and offices for the instructor. [T]here is now under the capable direction of a United States officer, a battalion of 150 young men in training to serve the State in almost any military capacity should occasion arise. This building is devoted also to the purpose of general Physical Culture.

Ballentine's daughter Alice married lawyer Henry Young Jr. in 1899, and the father-of-the-bride gave the couple a 100-acre (40 ha) tract of mountainous land in Bernardsville, New Jersey as a wedding gift. Four years later, Gifford designed a country house for the Youngs, "Brushwood," a 30-room Colonial Revival mansion overlooking Pleasant Valley.

Gifford designed the New Jersey Building for the 1893 World's Columbian Exposition in Chicago. This was a replica of the Ford Mansion in Morristown, New Jersey, General George Washington's headquarters, Winter 1779–1780. The building was used to promote business and tourism in the state, and served as headquarters for New Jersey visitors to the 1893 Fair. A decade later, Gifford designed another replica of the Ford Mansion for the 1904 Louisiana Purchase Exposition in St. Louis. After the 1904 Fair, the New Jersey Building was relocated to Kirkwood, Missouri, and converted into apartments.

The Mount Washington Hotel in Bretton Woods, New Hampshire is Gifford's best-known work. The 1902 Gilded Age hotel is a National Historic Landmark.

Several of Gifford's clients were members of the Jekyll Island Club, a private hunting resort in Glynn County, Georgia. Although never a member himself, he made multiple alterations to the Clubhouse, and designed the Sans Souci Apartments (1896), Pulitzer Cottage (1897–1898, burned 1951), Mistletoe Cottage (1900), and the Jekyll Island Clubhouse Annex (1901). All but Pulitzer Cottage survive, and are contributing properties in the Jekyll Island Club National Historic Landmark District. Gifford also designed the nearby Old Glynn County Courthouse (1906-1907) in Brunswick, Georgia.

== Selected works ==
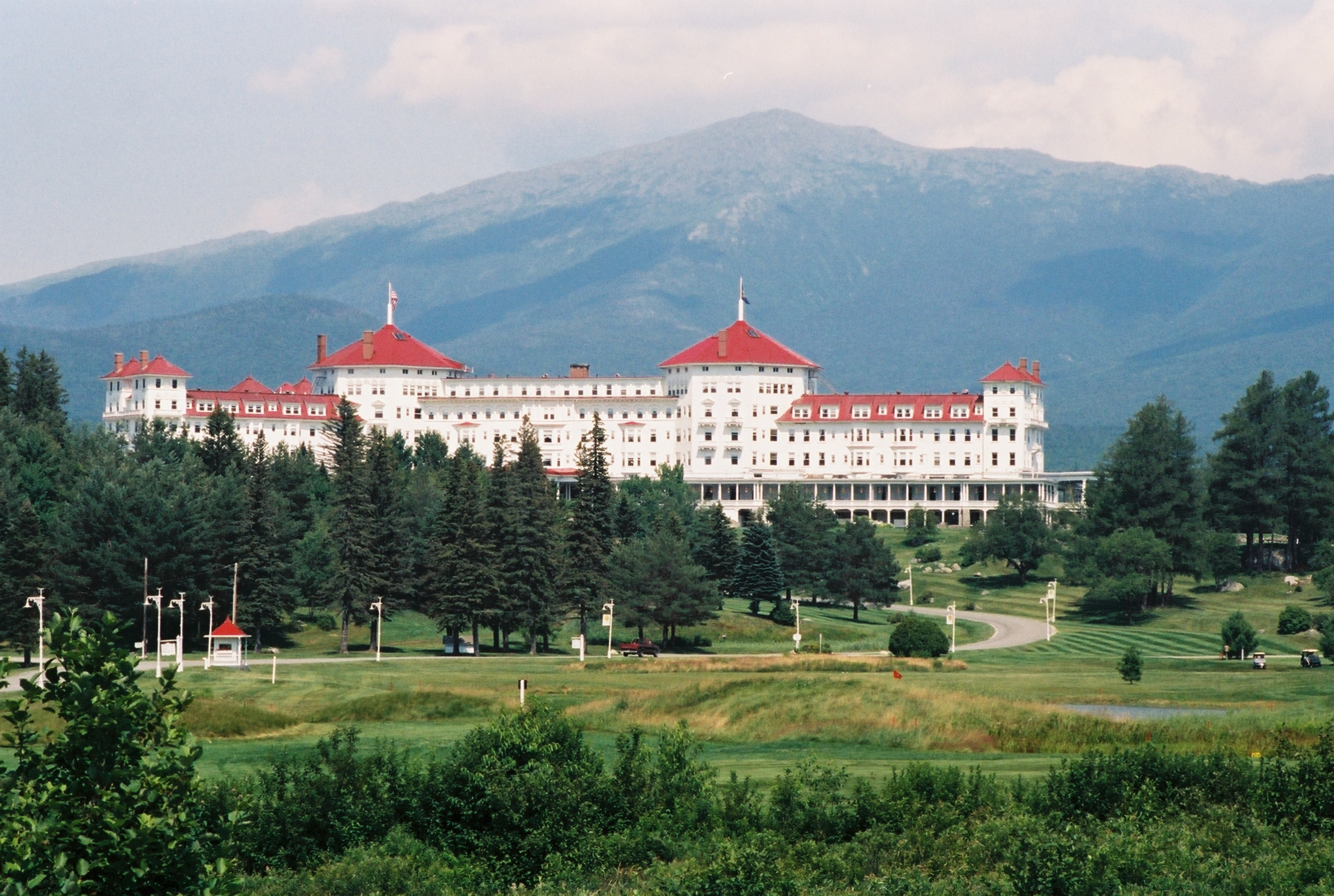
Mount Washington Hotel (1900–1902), Bretton Woods, New Hampshire

- Trinity Church Mission Chapel, Clark Street, Newark, New Jersey, 1883
- Augustus Newbold Morris Residence, Ridgefield, Connecticut, 1885
- Alterations to Franklin Murphy Residence, 1027 Broad Street, Newark, New Jersey, 1891. Murphy later was the 31st governor of New Jersey.
- Robert F. Ballentine Gymnasium, Rutgers University, New Brunswick, New Jersey, 1892–1894, burned and demolished 1930.
  - Zimmerli Art Museum at Rutgers University now occupies the Ballantine Gymnasium site.
- New Jersey State Building, World's Columbian Exposition, Chicago, Illinois, 1893, burned 1894.
- Central Presbyterian Church, 377 Clinton Avenue, Newark, New Jersey, 1893–1894
- Conyngham Manor, 130 South River Street, Wilkes-Barre, Pennsylvania, 1897. Designed for Gifford's father-in-law. Now part of Wilkes College
- Conyngham Stable, Wilkes-Barre, Pennsylvania, 1898.
- Alterations to "Markland" (Andrew Anderson Residence), 102 King Street, St. Augustine, Florida, 1899–1901. Gifford doubled the size of the 1839 Greek-Revival mansion. Now part of Flagler College
- Mount Washington Hotel, Bretton Woods, New Hampshire, 1900–1902. Built by Joseph Stickney as a resort hotel and spa.
- Young Men's Christian Association, 107 Halsey Street, Newark, New Jersey, 1901–1903, demolished.
- "Brushwood," (Henry Young Mansion), 134 Ballantine Road, Bernardsville, New Jersey, 1903–1904.
- "The Knoll" (George Macculloch Miller Residence), Morristown, New Jersey, 1904.
- New Jersey State Building, Louisiana Purchase Exposition, St. Louis, Missouri, 1904, demolished. "Washington's Headquarters at Morristown."
- 146 East 56th Street, New York City, 1905. Three-story Neo-Georgian stable/carriagehouse built for Edwin Gould. The first story currently houses a hair salon, Bumble and Bumble.
- Clifton House Hotel, Niagara Falls, Ontario, Canada, 1905, burned 1932
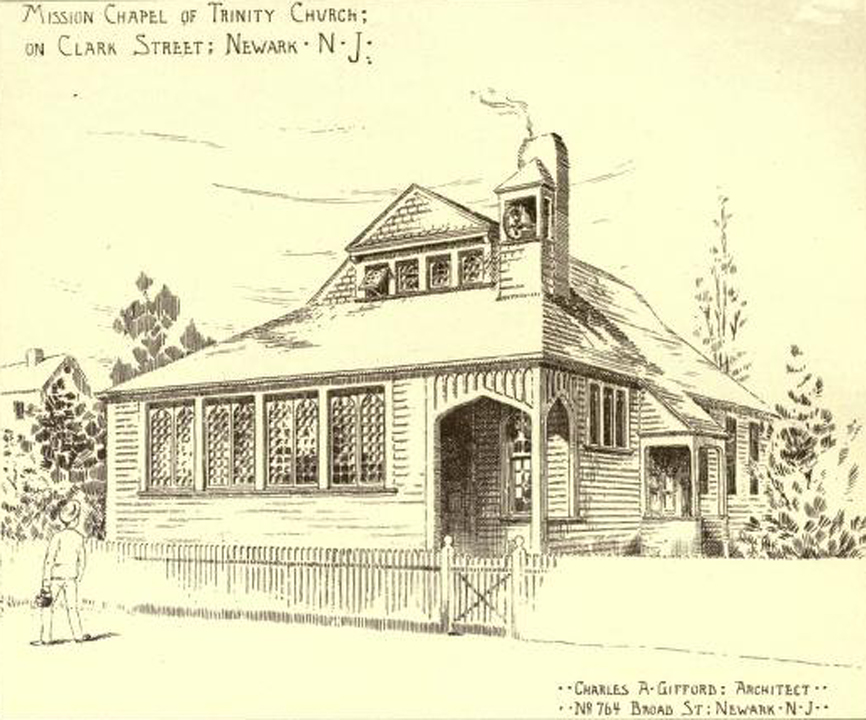
Trinity Church Mission Chapel (1883), Newark, New Jersey

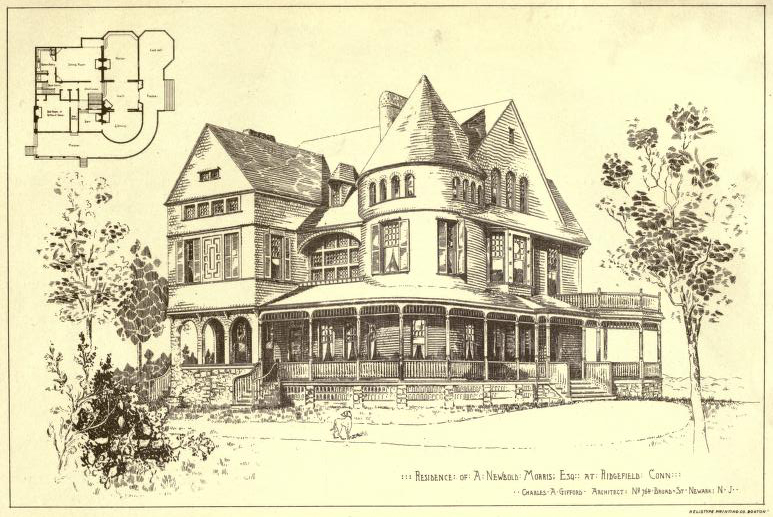
A. Newbold Morris Residence (1885), Ridgefield, Connecticut

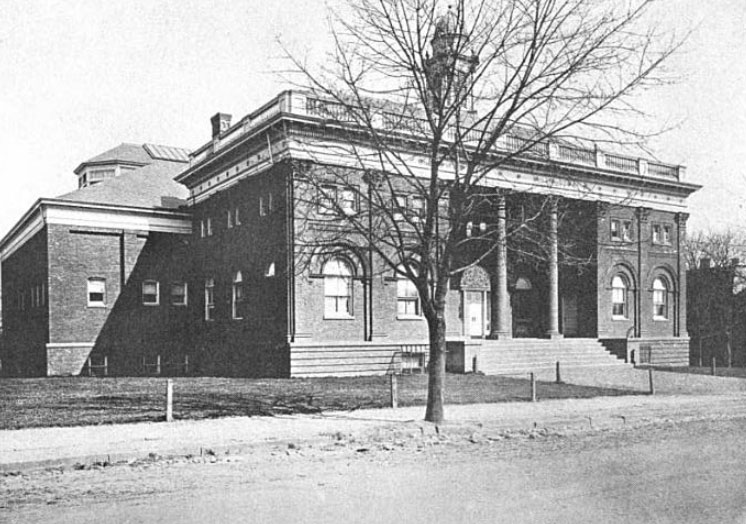
Ballentine Gymnasium (1892–1894, demolished), New Brunswick, New Jersey

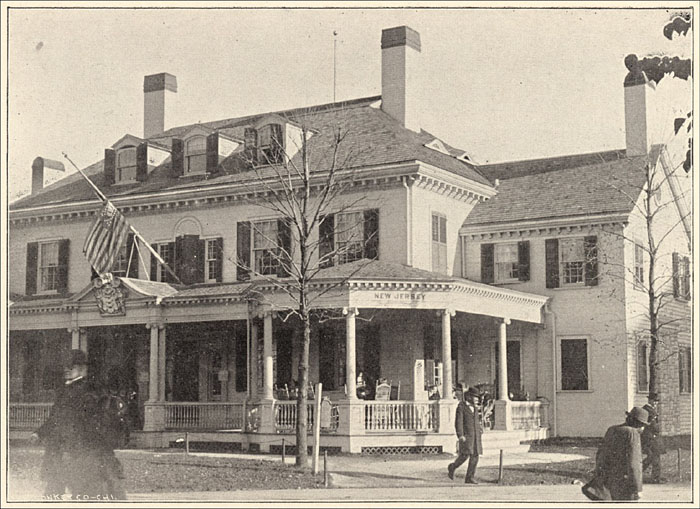
New Jersey State Building, 1893 World's Fair, Chicago, Illinois, demolished

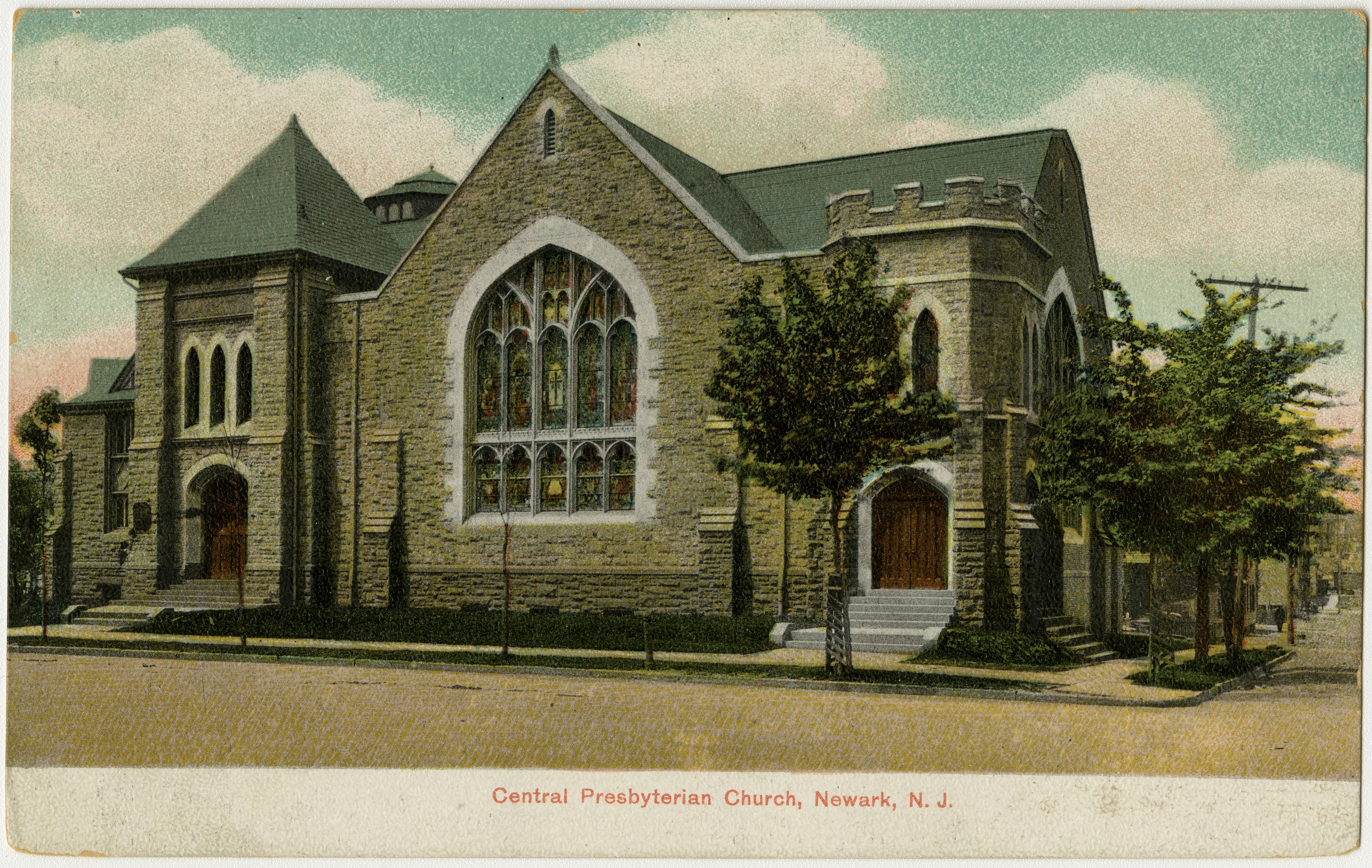
Central Presbyterian Church (1893–1894), Newark, New Jersey

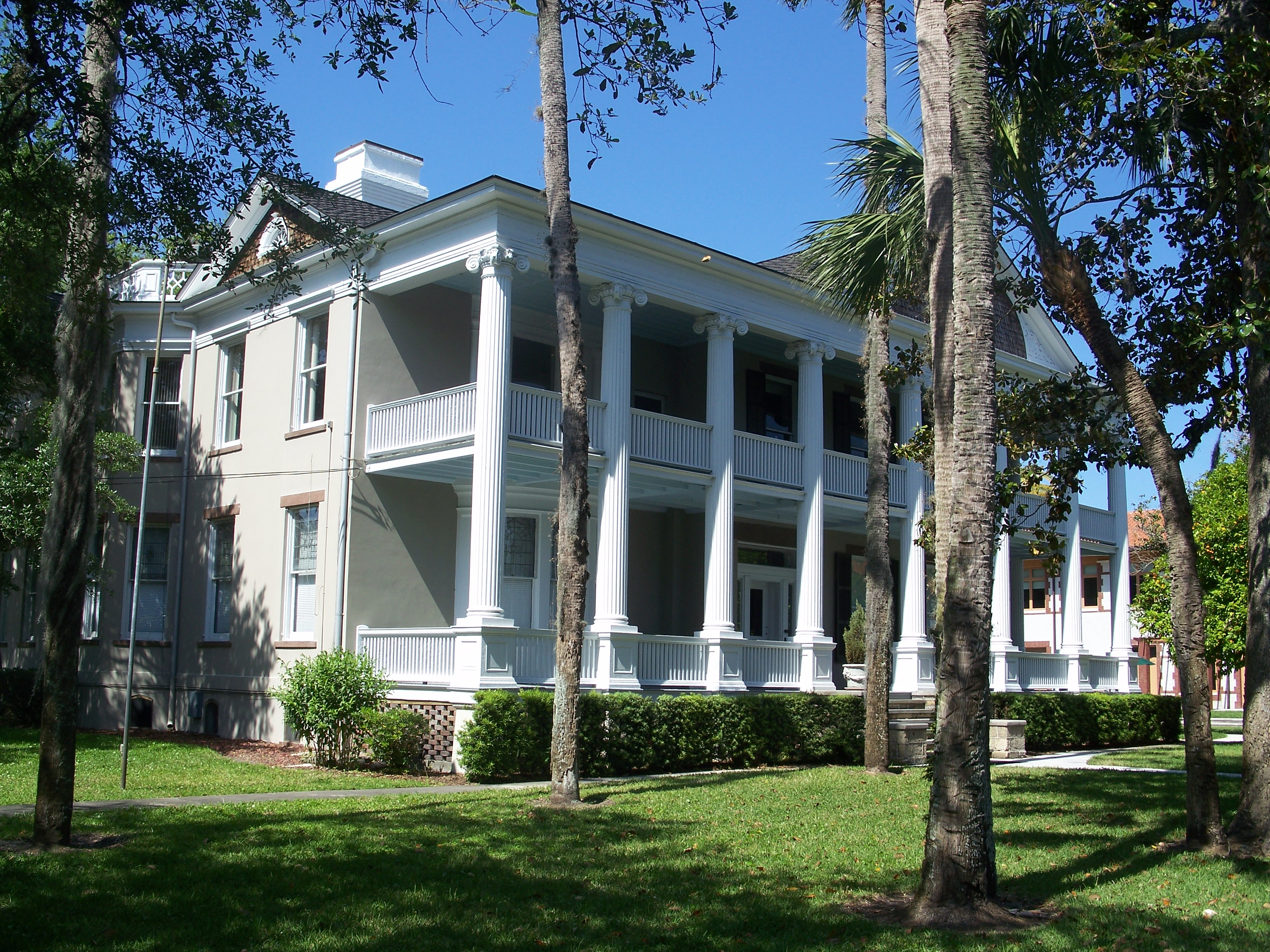
"Markland" (altered 1899–1901), Flagler College, St. Augustine, Florida

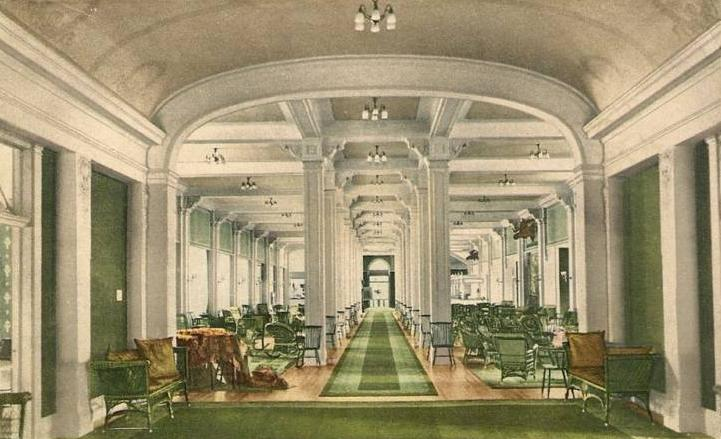
Assembly Hall, Mount Washington Hotel (1900–1902), Bretton Woods, New Hampshire

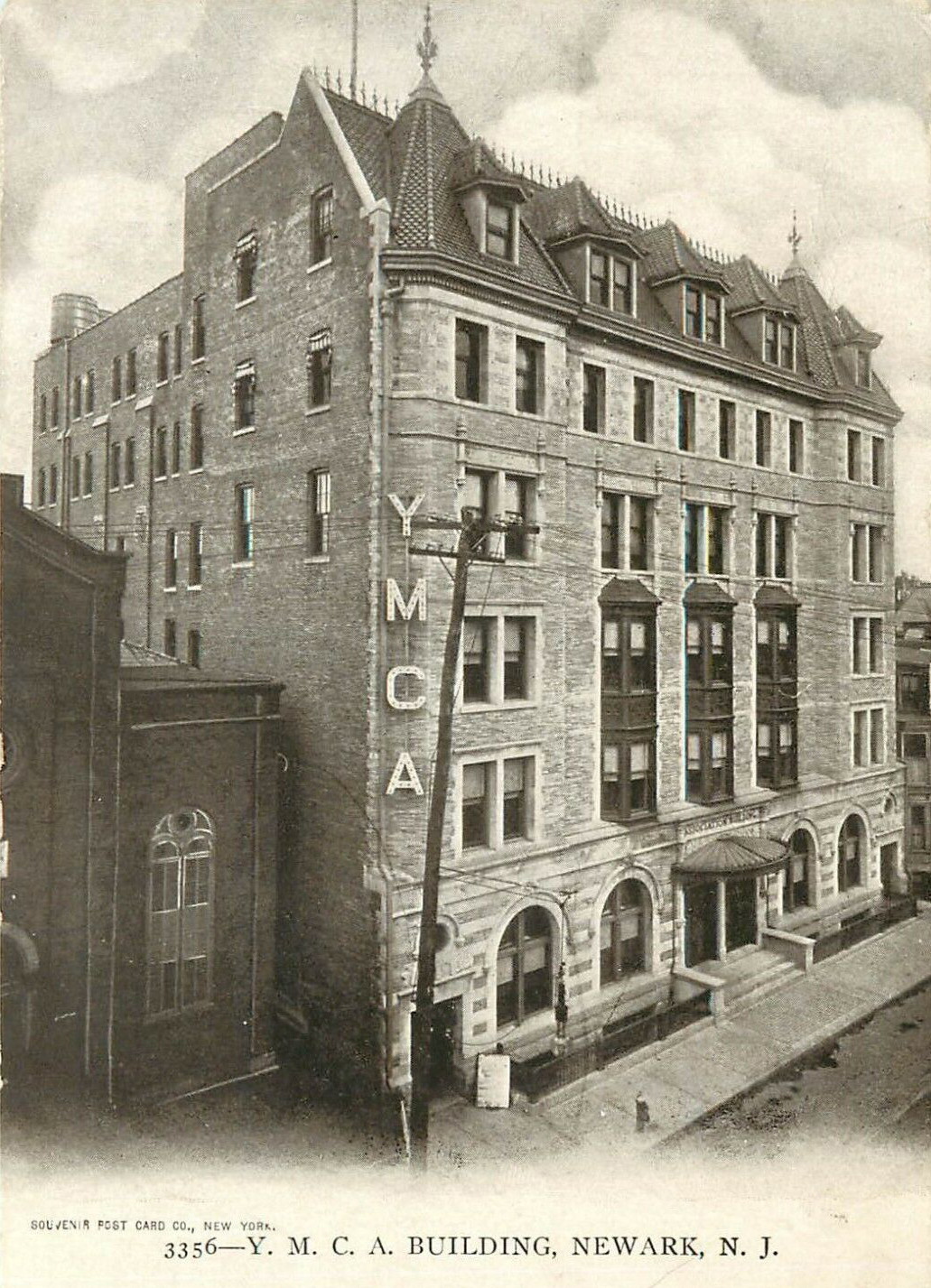
Y.M.C.A. Building (1901–1903, demolished), Newark, New Jersey

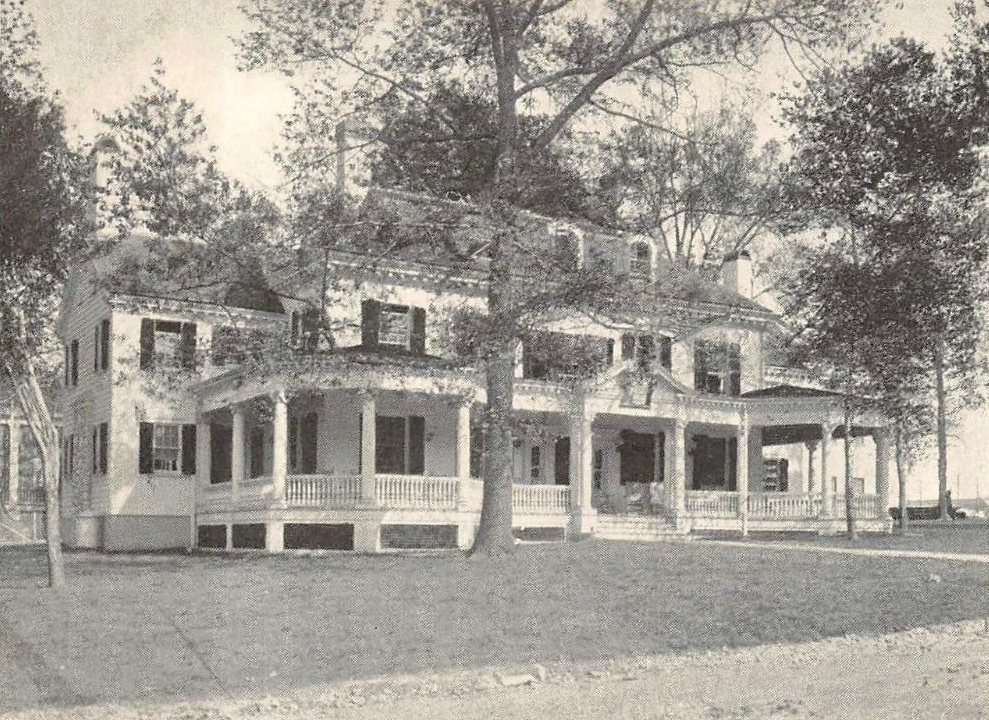
New Jersey State Building, 1904 World's Fair, St. Louis, Missouri, demolished

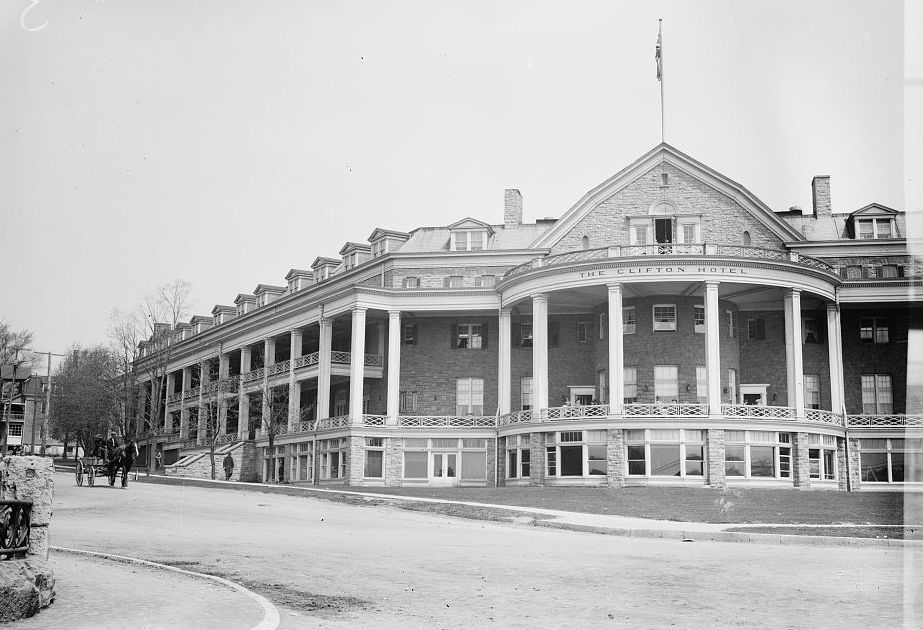
Clifton House Hotel (1905, burned 1932), Niagara Falls, Ontario

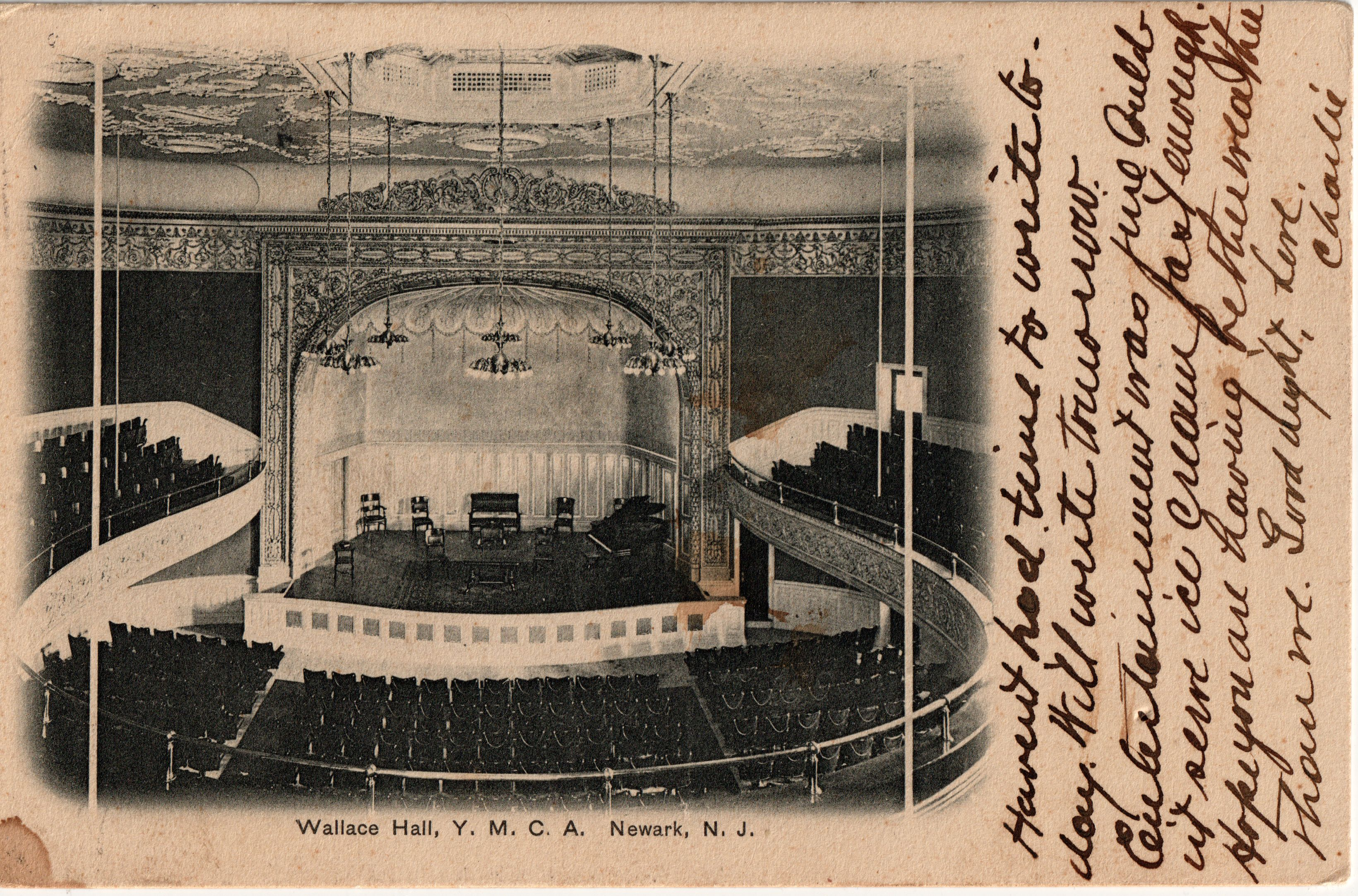
Wallace Hall, YMCA Building, Newark, New Jersey

=== New Jersey armories ===
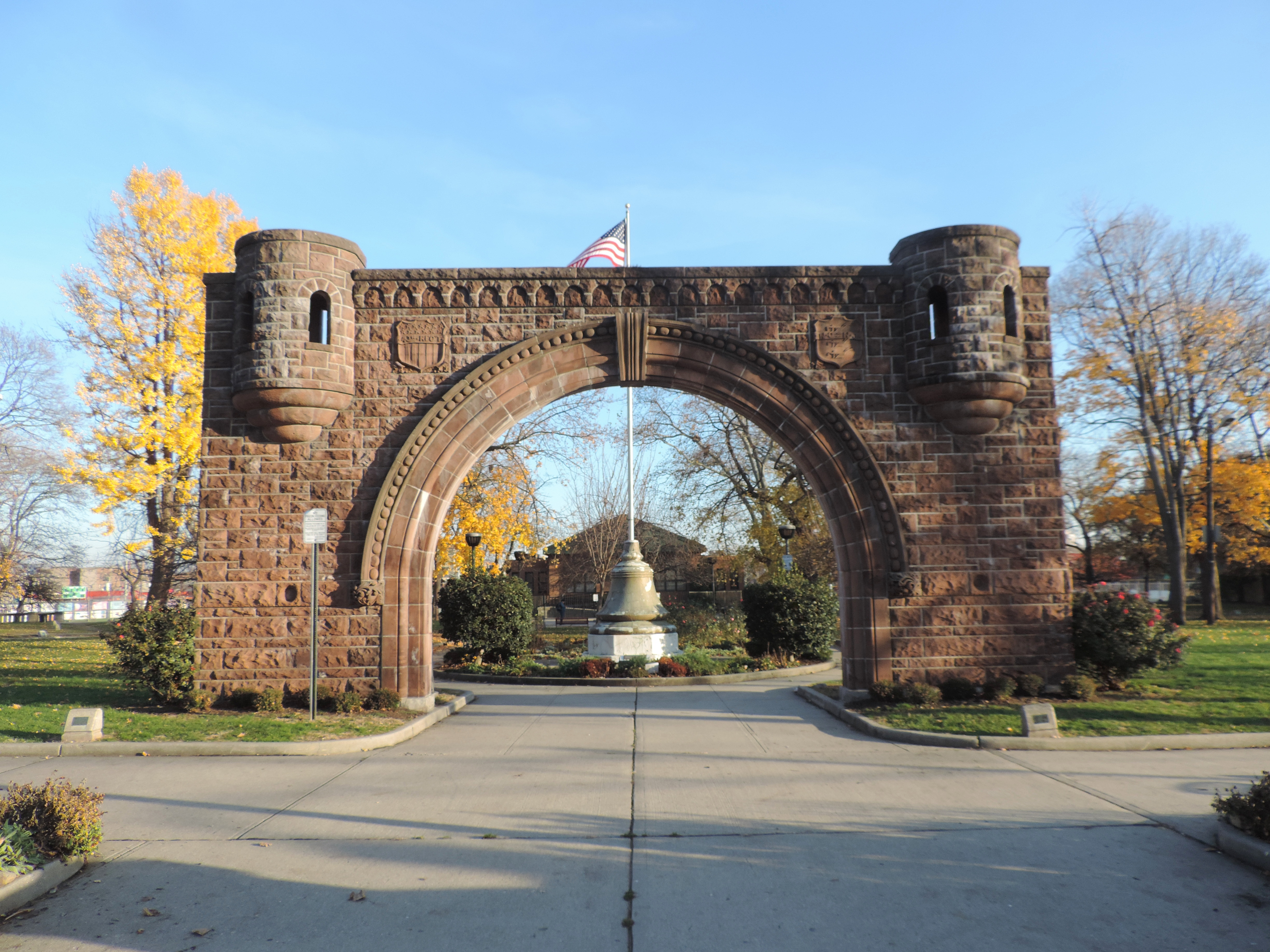
4th Regiment Armory Arch, relocated to Pershing Field, Jersey City

- 4th Regiment Armory, Bergen Avenue, Jersey City, New Jersey, 1893–1895, burned 1927, demolished.
  - The armory's entrance arch was salvaged and reassembled in Pershing Field. Hudson Catholic Regional High School was built on the armory's former site.
- 5th Regiment Armory, Market Street, Paterson, New Jersey, 1894–1895, burned 2015
- 3rd Regiment Armory, Haddon Avenue & Mickle Street, Camden, New Jersey, 1896–1897, demolished 1977.
  - Renamed "Camden Convention Center" in the 1950s, it hosted conventions, circuses and sporting events. Home of the Camden Bullets, 1961–1966, 1970–1971.
- 1st Regiment Armory, Sussex Avenue & Hudson Street, Newark, New Jersey, 1898–1899, demolished
- 2nd Regiment Armory, East State Street & Delaware and Raritan Canal, Trenton, New Jersey, 1902–1905, burned 1975, demolished.
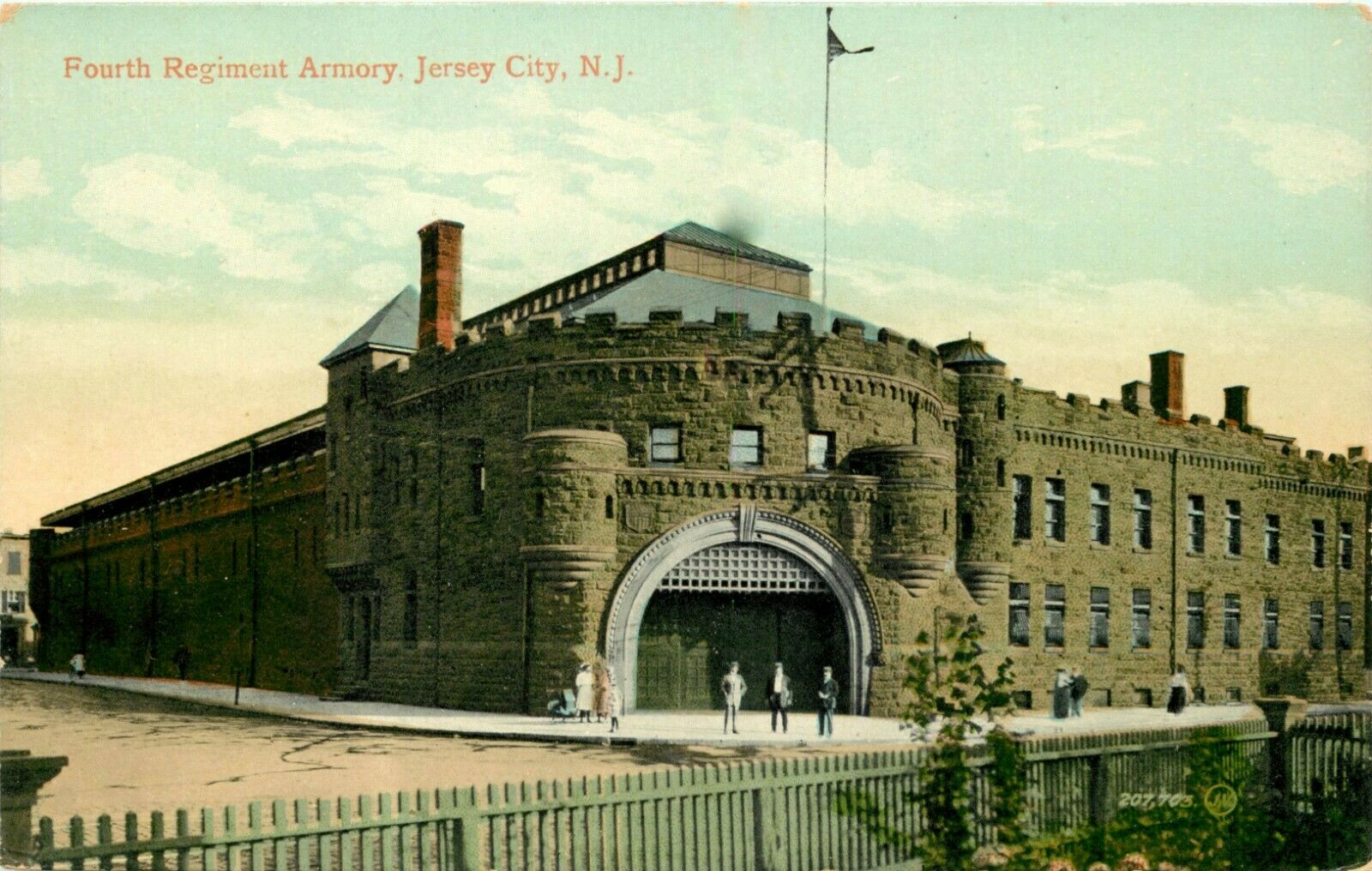
4th Regiment Armory (1893-1895, demolished), Jersey City

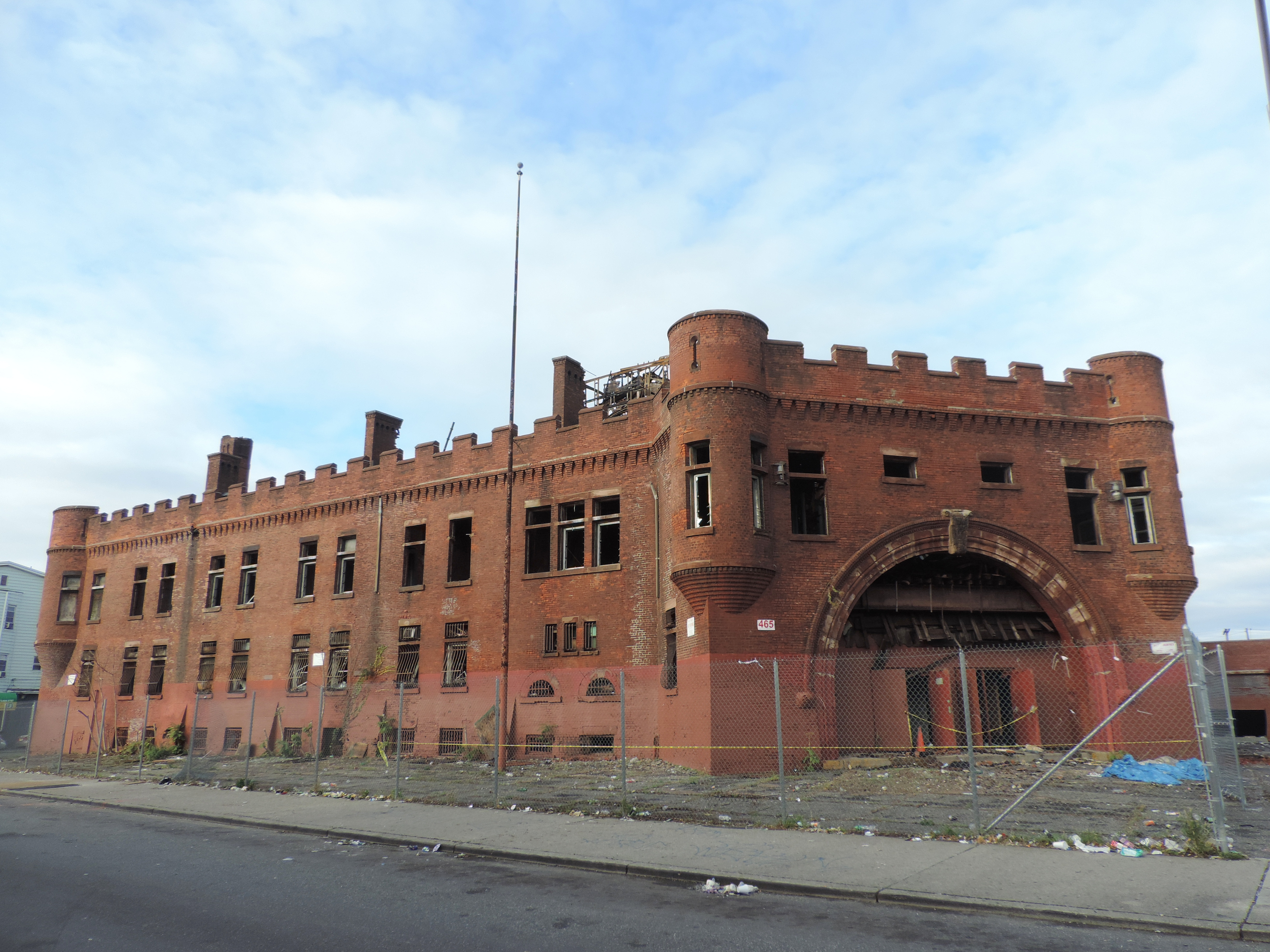
5th Regiment Armory (1894-1895), Paterson

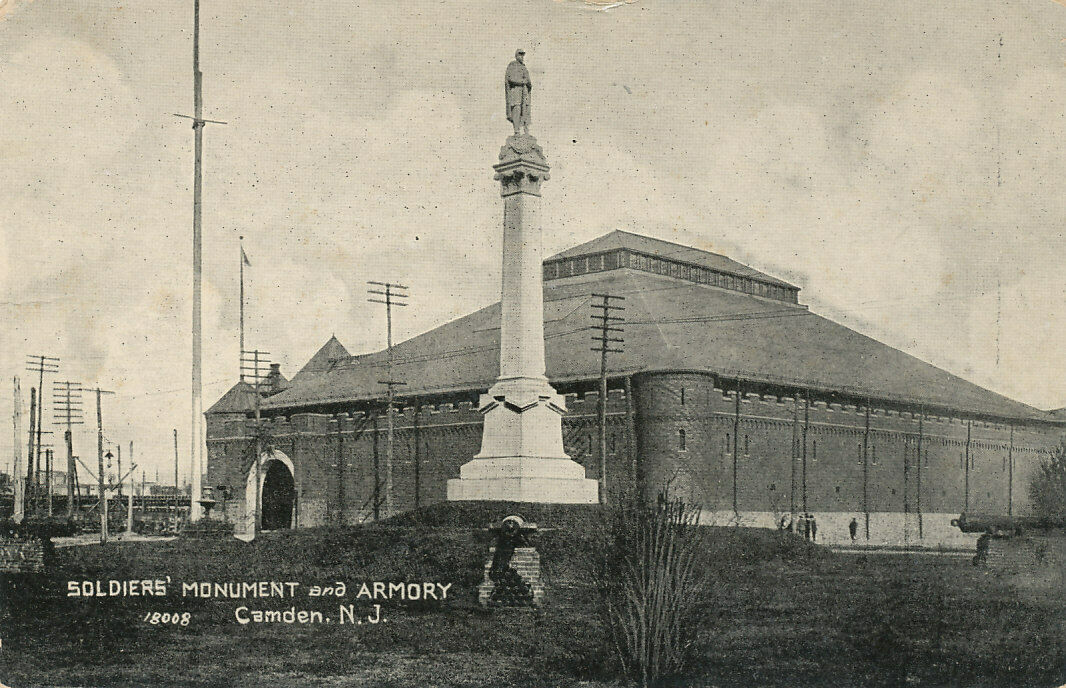
3rd Regiment Armory (1896-1897, demolished), Camden

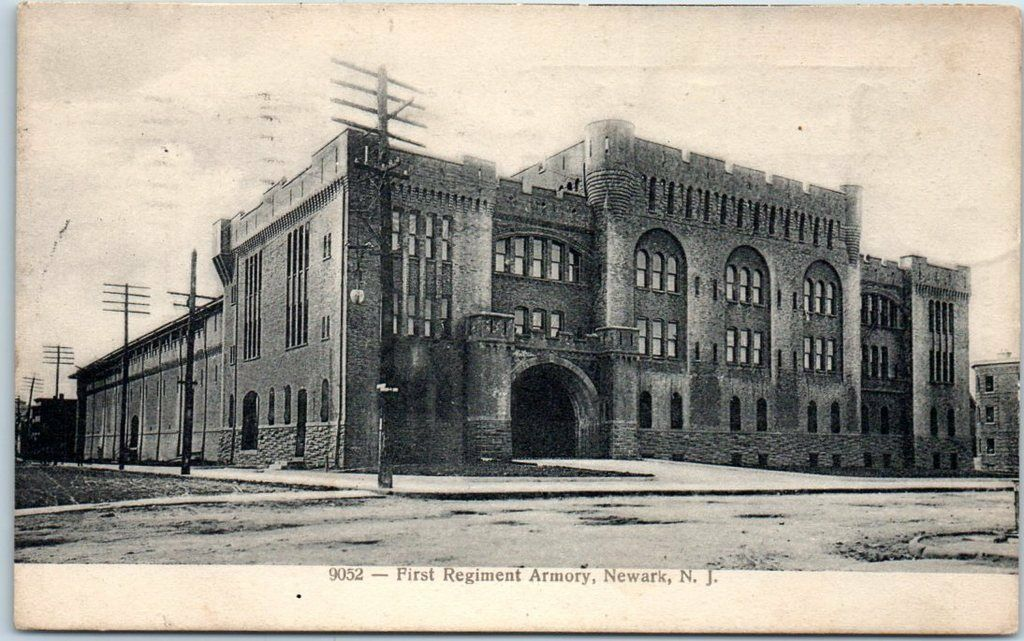
1st Regiment Armory (1898-1899, demolished), Newark

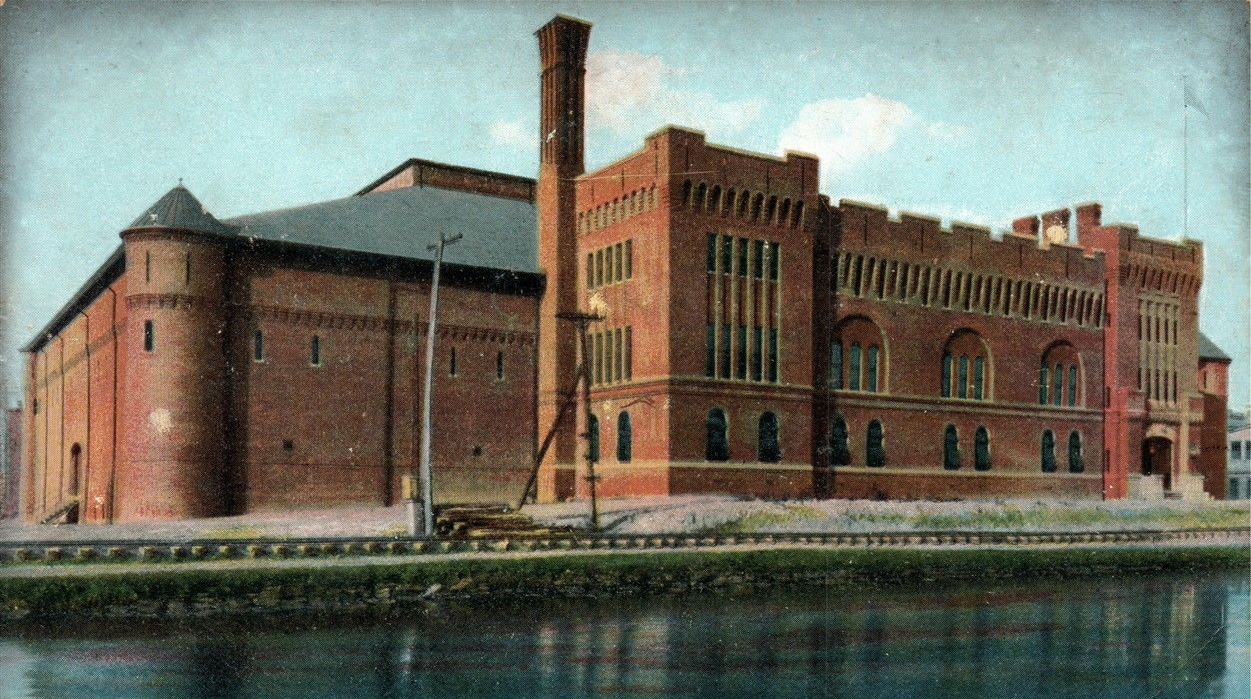
2nd Regiment Armory (1902-1905, demolished), Trenton

=== Glynn County, Georgia ===
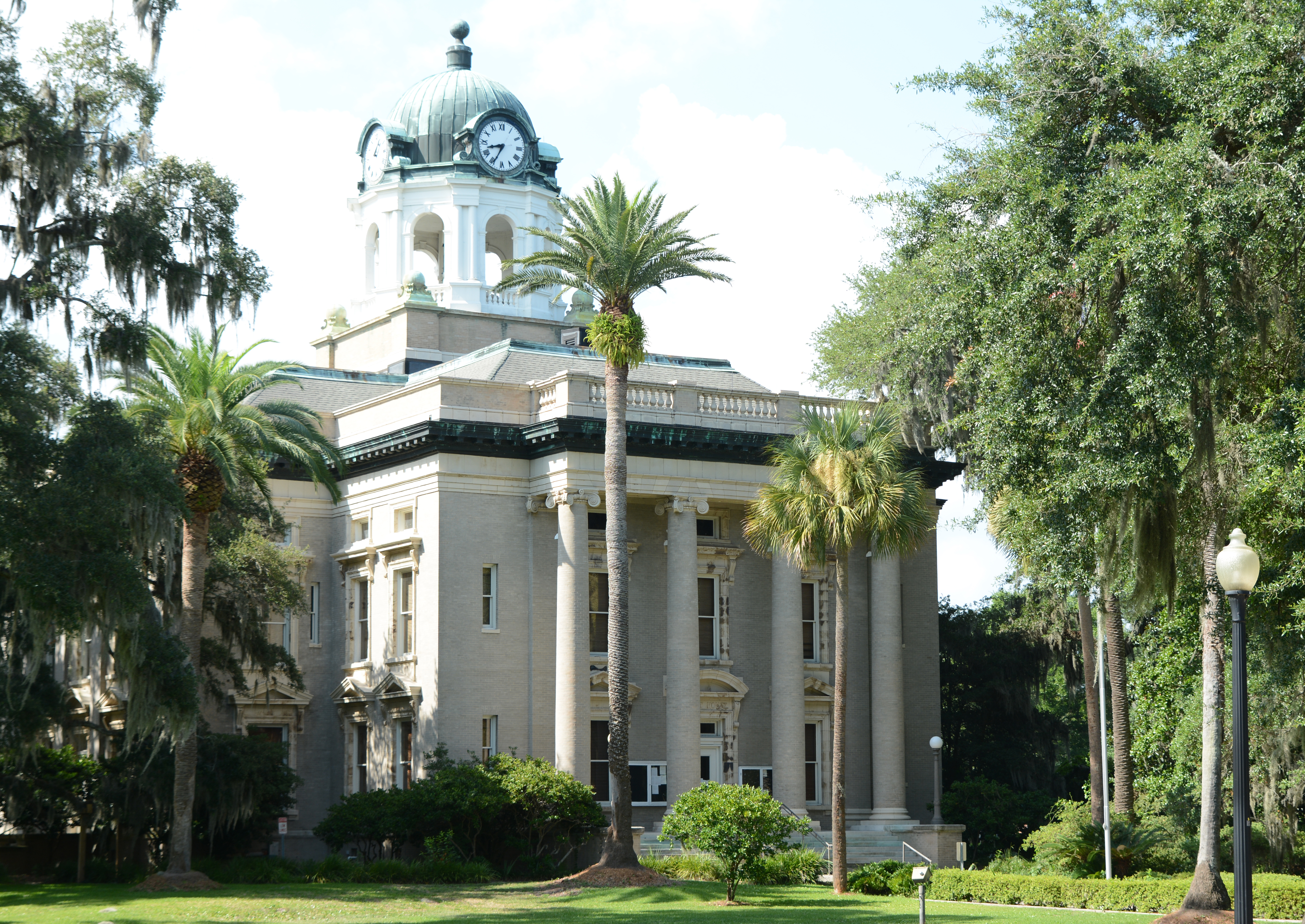
Old Glynn County Courthouse (1906–1907), Brunswick

- San Souci Apartments, Jekyll Island, Georgia, 1896. A six-unit condominium, J. P. Morgan owned one of the units
- Joseph Pulitzer Cottage, Jekyll Island, Georgia, 1897–1898. Burned by arsonists and demolished 1951
- Mistletoe Cottage, Jekyll Island, Georgia, 1900. Built for Henry Kirke Porter
- Jekyll Island Clubhouse Annex, Jekyll Island, Georgia, 1901–1903
  - Four 4-bedroom condominium apartments on the first story; the same on the second story; twenty guest bedrooms on the third story; servant bedrooms on the fourth story
- Old Glynn County Courthouse, G Street, Brunswick, Georgia, 1906–1907. A new courthouse was built behind the old one in 1991. The old courthouse now houses Glynn County Probate Court.
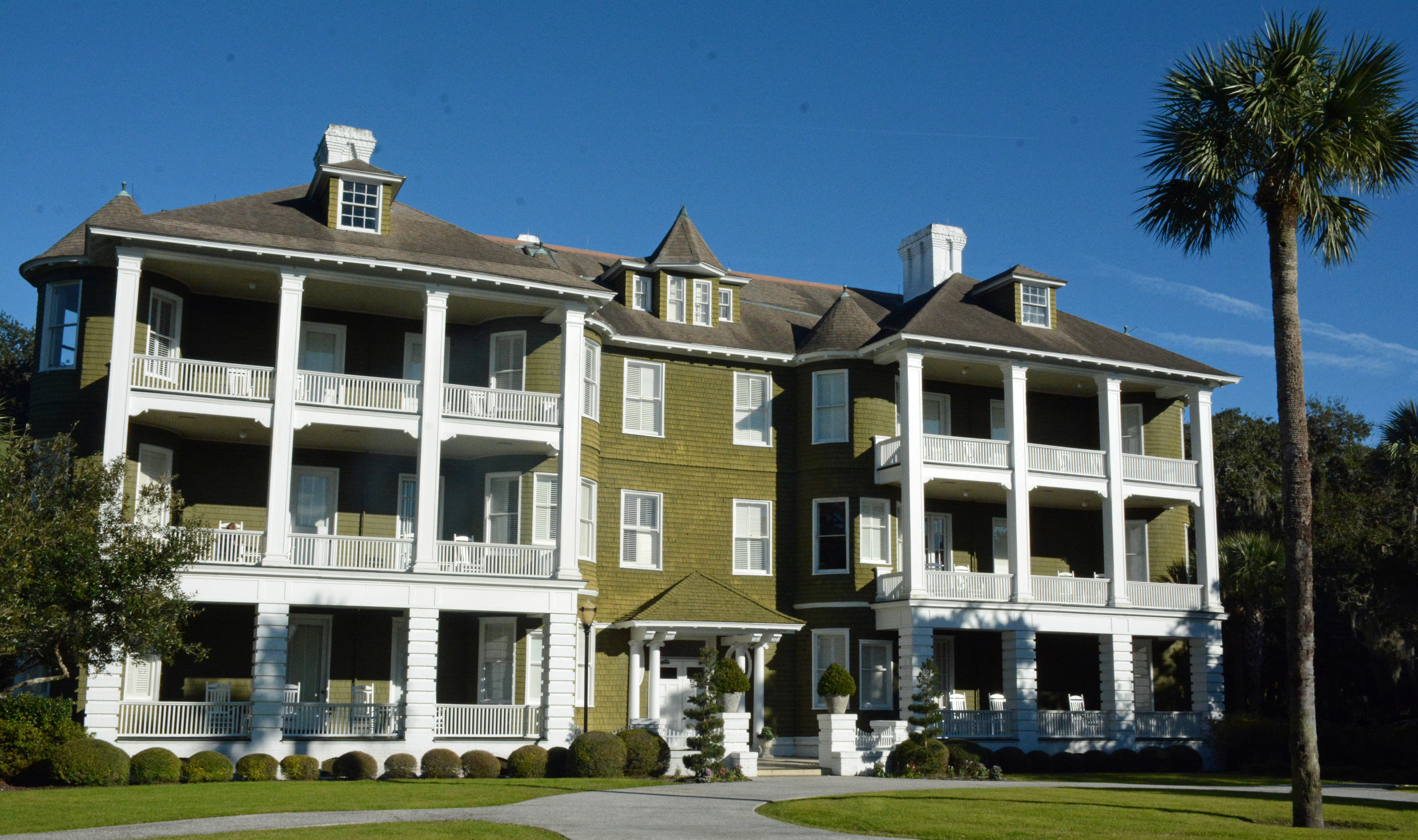
San Souci Apartments (1896), Jekyll Island

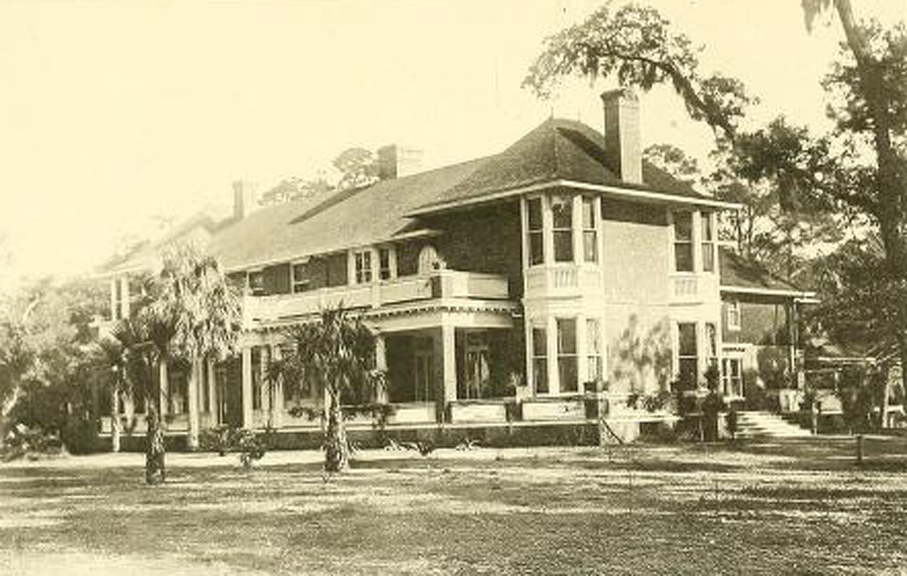
Joseph Pulitzer Cottage (1896-1897, burned 1951), Jekyll Island

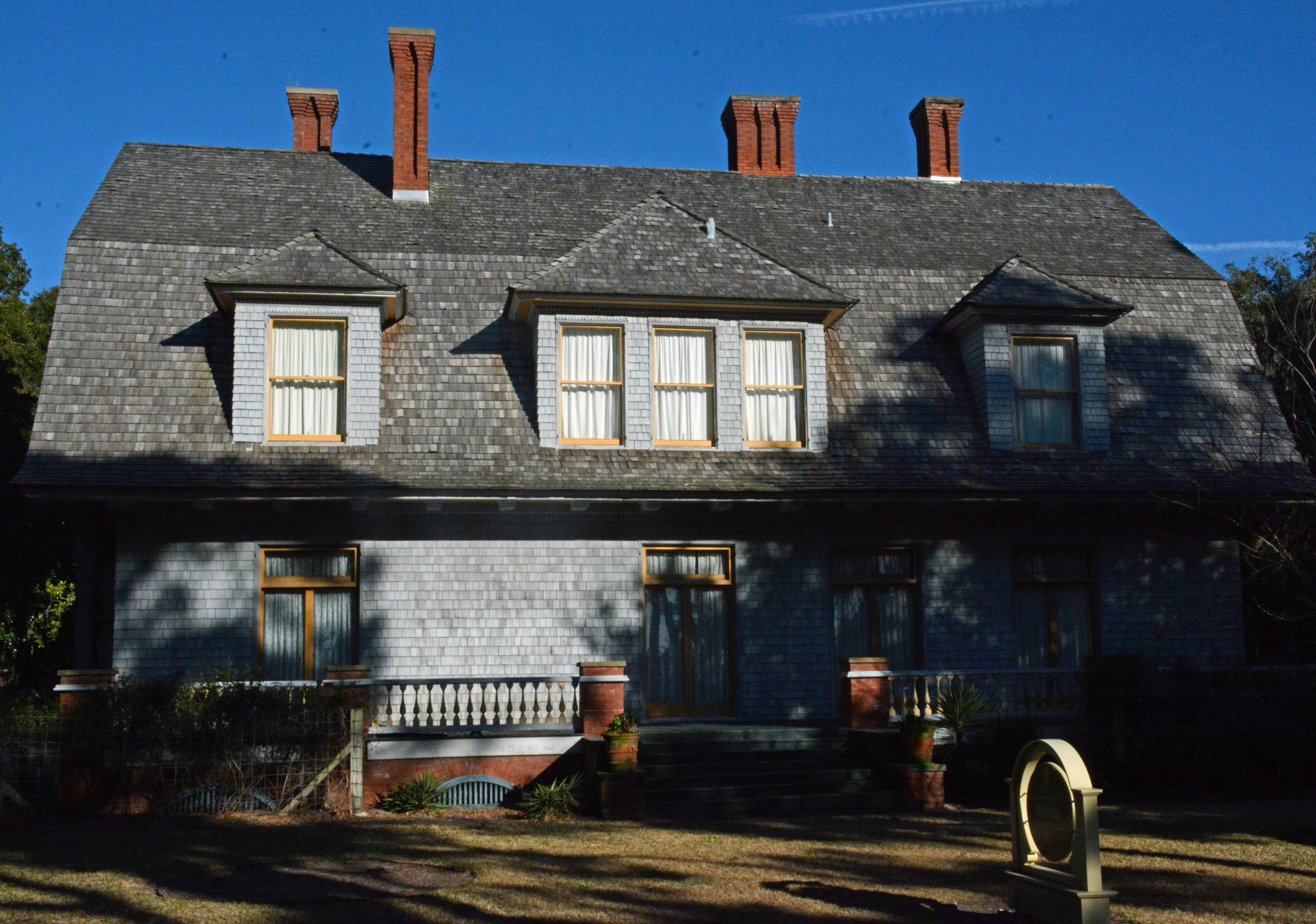
Mistletoe Cottage (1900), Jekyll Island

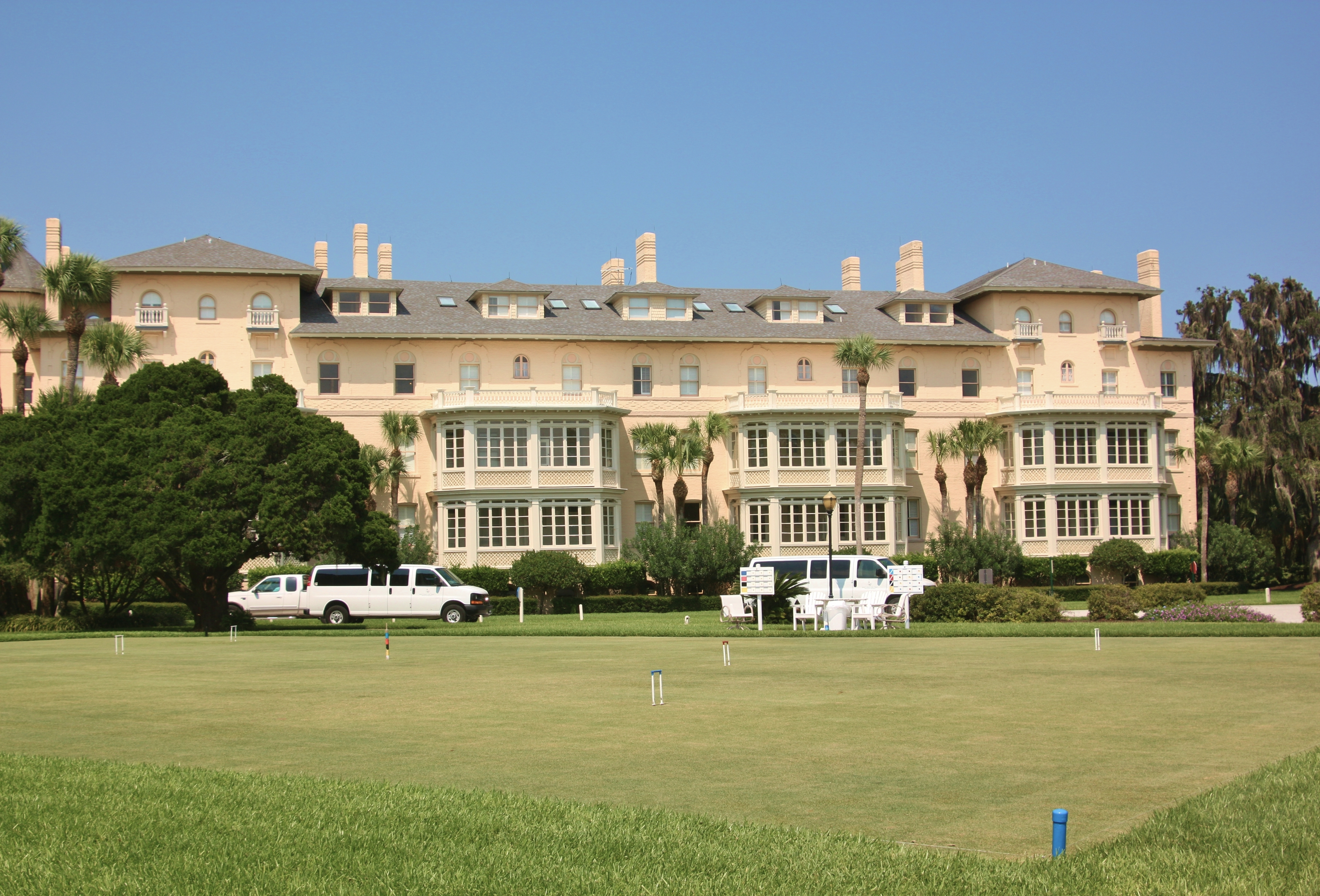
Jekyll Island Clubhouse Annex (1901-1903), Jekyll Island

== Personal ==
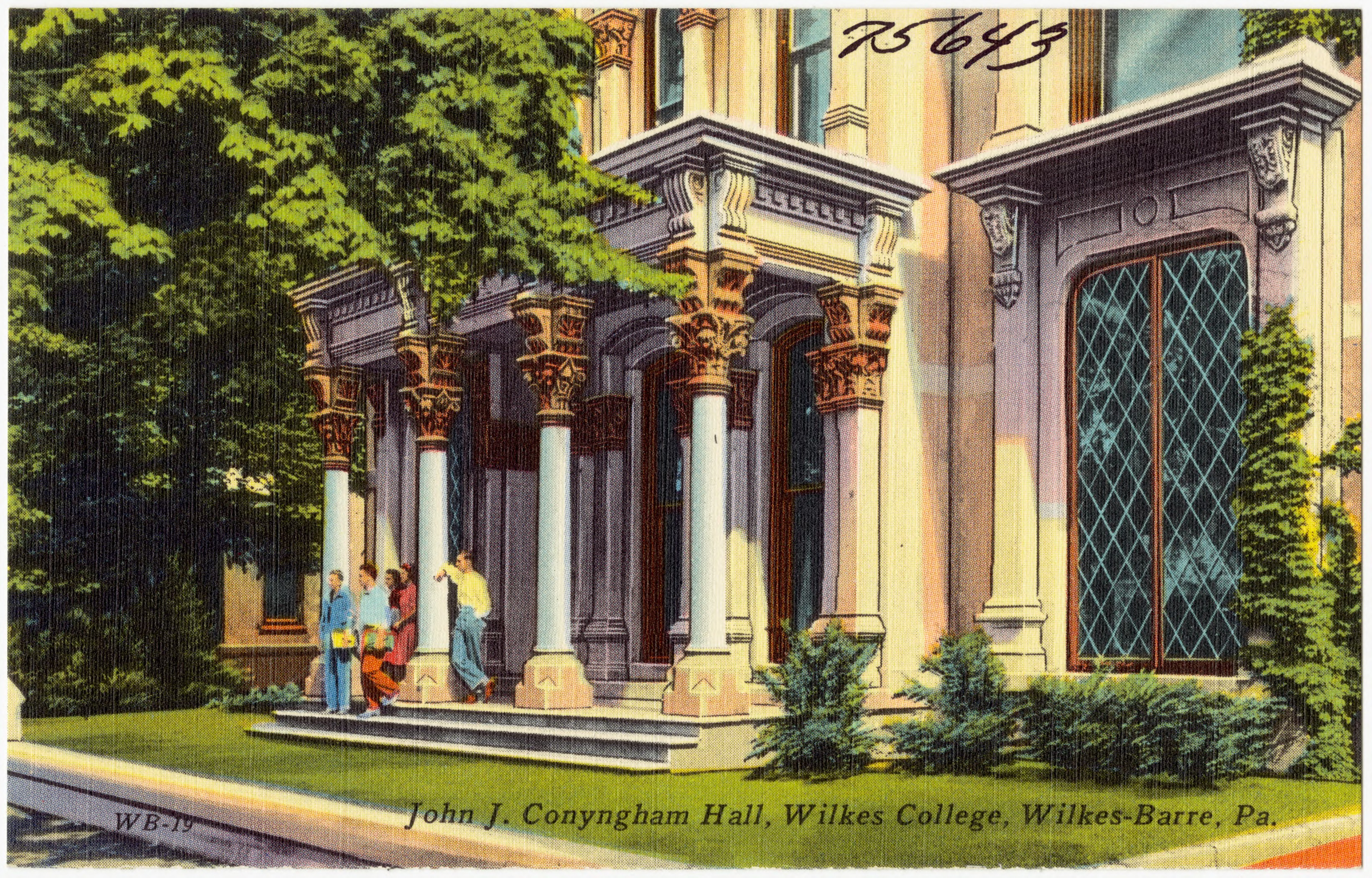
Conyngham Manor (1897), Wilkes-Barre, Pennsylvania.

On December 10, 1890, Gifford married Helen M. Conyngham (1868–1928), the daughter of Col. Charles Miner Conyngham and Helen Hunter Turner Conyngham of Wilkes-Barre, Pennsylvania. The Giffords had five children: Alice Conyngham, Charles Conyngham (1895–1962), John Archer, Herbert Cammamann, and Donald Stanton.

Gifford designed a Wilkes-Barre mansion for his father-in-law, "Conyngham Manor." It is now the Conyngham Student Center of Wilkes College.

Gifford and his family lived at 60 Park Place in Newark. He later designed and built a country house in Summit, New Jersey. Helen Conyngham Gifford died May 9, 1928.

Gifford retired to their seashore home, at 7 South Brighton Avenue, Atlantic City, New Jersey. He died there on May 3, 1937, and is interred at Mount Pleasant Cemetery in Newark, New Jersey.
