= Mount Washington Hotel =

Hotel in Bretton Woods, New Hampshire

- U.S. National Register of Historic Places
- U.S. National Historic Landmark
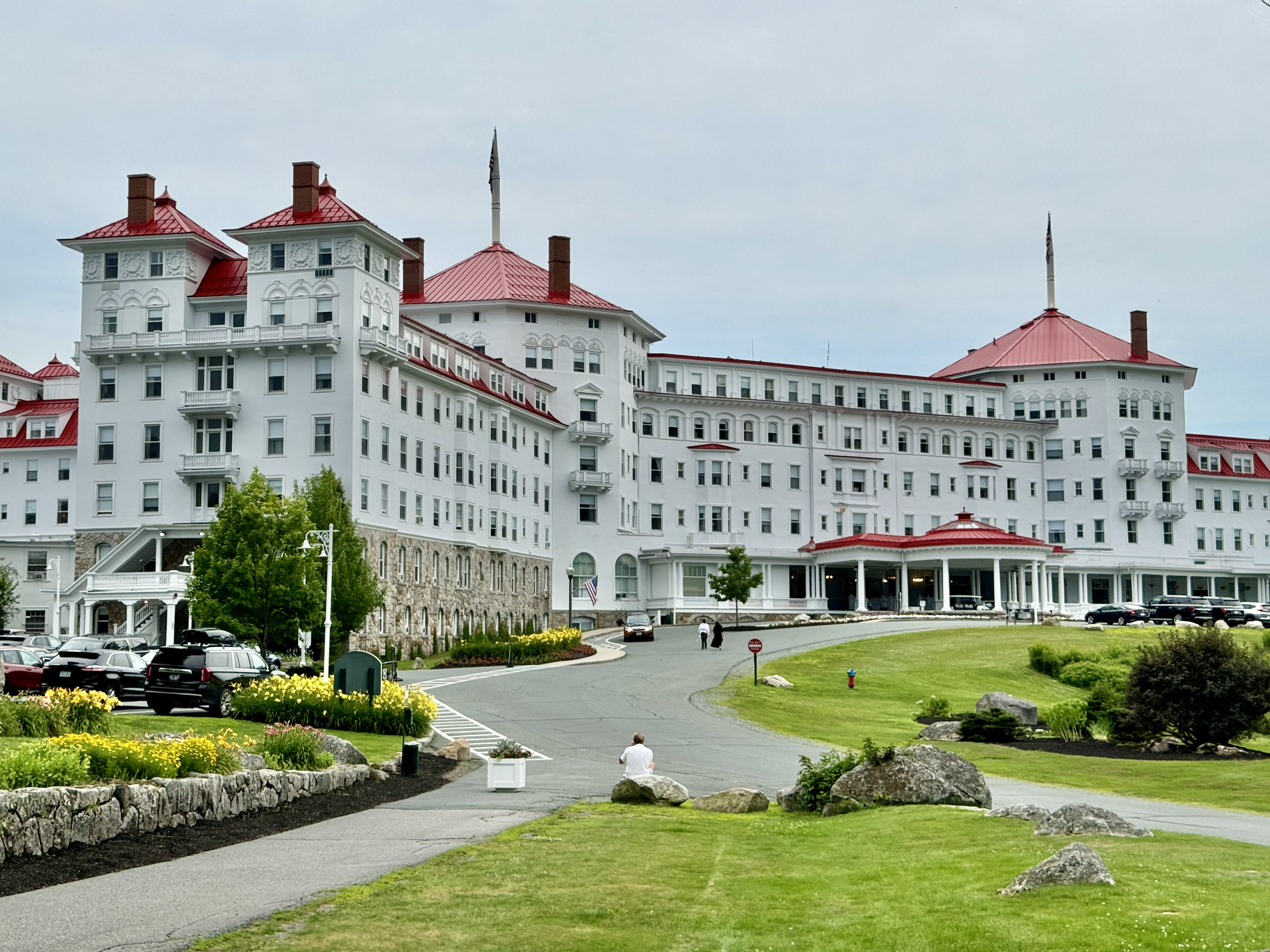
- The hotel's south face in 2024

- Location within New Hampshire Location within the United States
- Location: 310 Mount Washington Hotel Rd., Bretton Woods, New Hampshire, U.S.
- Coordinates: 44°15′26″N 71°26′22″W
- Built: 1900–1902
- Architect: Charles Alling Gifford
- Architectural style: Renaissance Revival
- Website: Official website
- NRHP reference No.: 78000213

Significant dates
- Added to NRHP: September 27, 1978
- Designated NHL: June 24, 1986

The Omni Mount Washington Resort is a historic luxury resort hotel in Bretton Woods, New Hampshire, United States, near Mount Washington. It was designed by Charles Alling Gifford. In 1944, it hosted the Bretton Woods Conference, which established the International Monetary Fund and the World Bank. It is a member of Historic Hotels of America, the official program of the National Trust for Historic Preservation.

The area, part of the town of Carroll, New Hampshire, includes the Bretton Woods ski resort nearby. It is located at the northern end of Crawford Notch, 6 miles (10 km) east of the village of Twin Mountain along U.S. Route 302.

== History ==
The Mount Washington Hotel was constructed between 1900 and 1902 at a cost of $1.7 million (approximately $66 million today) by Joseph Stickney, a native of Concord, New Hampshire, who had made a fortune before the age of 30 as a coal broker in Pennsylvania. In 1881 Stickney and his partner, John N. Conyngham, had purchased the nearby Mount Pleasant Hotel (a large early hotel demolished in 1939) from lumberman John T.G. Leavitt. Subsequently, Stickney began work on his Mount Washington Hotel. He had envisioned the hotel to be a luxurious getaway for urban dwellers looking to escape the city.

Stickney brought in 250 Italian artisans to build it, particularly the granite and stucco masonry. Construction started in 1900 on the Y-shaped hotel, which opened on July 28, 1902. At its completion, the hotel boasted over 2,000 doors, 12,000 windows, and over eleven miles of plumbing.

At the opening ceremony, Stickney told the audience, "Look at me, gentlemen ... for I am the poor fool who built all this!" Within a year he was dead at the age of 64 due to a heart attack.

His wife, Carolyn Stickney, spent her summers at the hotel for the next decade, adding the Sun Dining Room with guest rooms above, the fourth floor between the towers, and the chapel honoring her late husband. Under its capable first manager, John Anderson, the hotel was a success. But the advent of income tax, Prohibition, and the Great Depression curtailed the hospitality business. In 1936, Mrs. Stickney's nephew, Foster Reynolds, inherited the hotel, but it closed in 1942 because of World War II. In 1944, a Boston syndicate bought the extensive property for about $450,000. The Bretton Woods monetary conference took place that year, establishing the World Bank and the International Monetary Fund. The owners were paid $300,000 for the loss of business and promised a daily room charge of $18 per person for the 19-day conference. Subsequently, each bedroom carried a plaque outside its door identifying which country's representative at that conference had stayed in that room.

The Mount Washington Hotel and Resort is one of the last surviving grand hotels in the White Mountains and includes an 18-hole Donald Ross-designed golf course, as well as the hotel's original 9-hole course designed by A.H. Findlay.

It was declared a National Historic Landmark in 1986.

In 1991, the hotel was sold to MWH Preservation Limited Partnership for $3.1 million.

The hotel opened for its first winter season in 1999. Until then, the hotel was seasonal, and would close to guests late in the fall and open in the spring. The entire hotel was overhauled before the winter, with efficient windows installed throughout.

In June 2006, the Bretton Woods Mountain Resort, consisting of 991 acres, including the Mount Washington Hotel, the Bretton Arms Country Inn, The Lodge at Bretton Woods, and the Bretton Woods Ski Area, was sold to the CNL Financial Group, of Orlando, Florida for $45 million. Soon after, they spent an additional $40 million on the adjacent golf course and development rights.

In January 2009, the Mount Washington Resort completed a 50,000 square feet (4,600 m^{2}) addition that includes a 25,000-square-foot (2,300 m^{2}) spa and a 25,000-square-foot (2,300 m^{2}) conference center. Omni Hotels & Resorts assumed management of both the Mount Washington Hotel and the Bretton Arms Inn in September of that year and the hotel became the Omni Mount Washington Resort.

In November 2010, it was revealed that CNL had sought to trademark the Mount Washington name, which upset area business owners. CNL said they were just directing their efforts against other hotels in the area that have the mountain's name and not other businesses that also have it.

In December 2015, the Bretton Woods Mountain Resort, including both hotels, was purchased by Omni Hotels & Resorts from CNL.

== Gallery ==
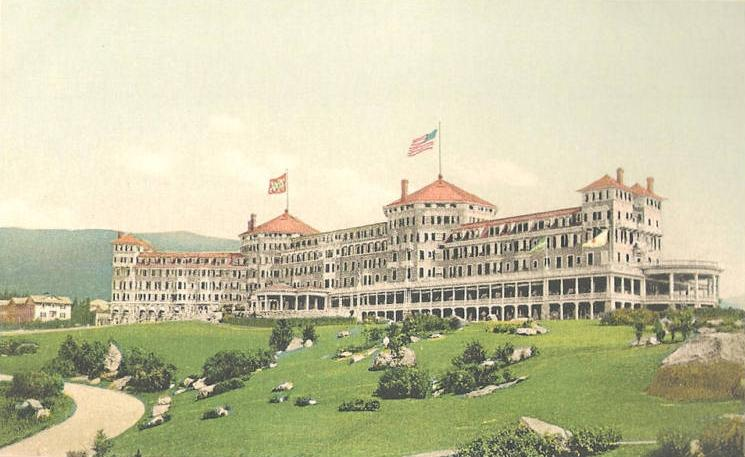
The hotel c. 1910

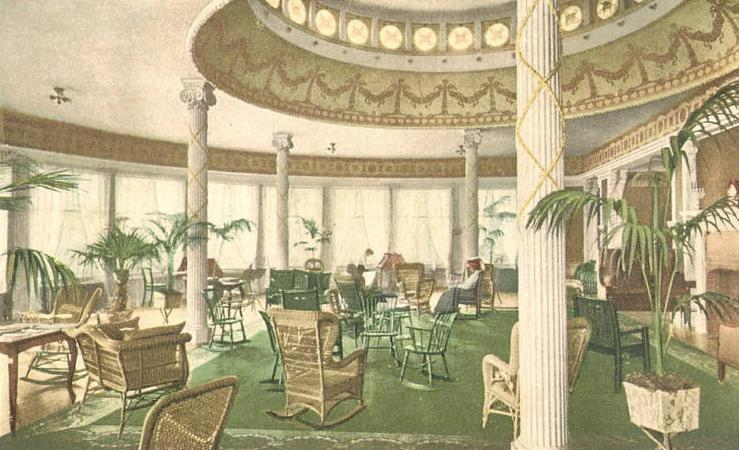
The Hemicycle c. 1910

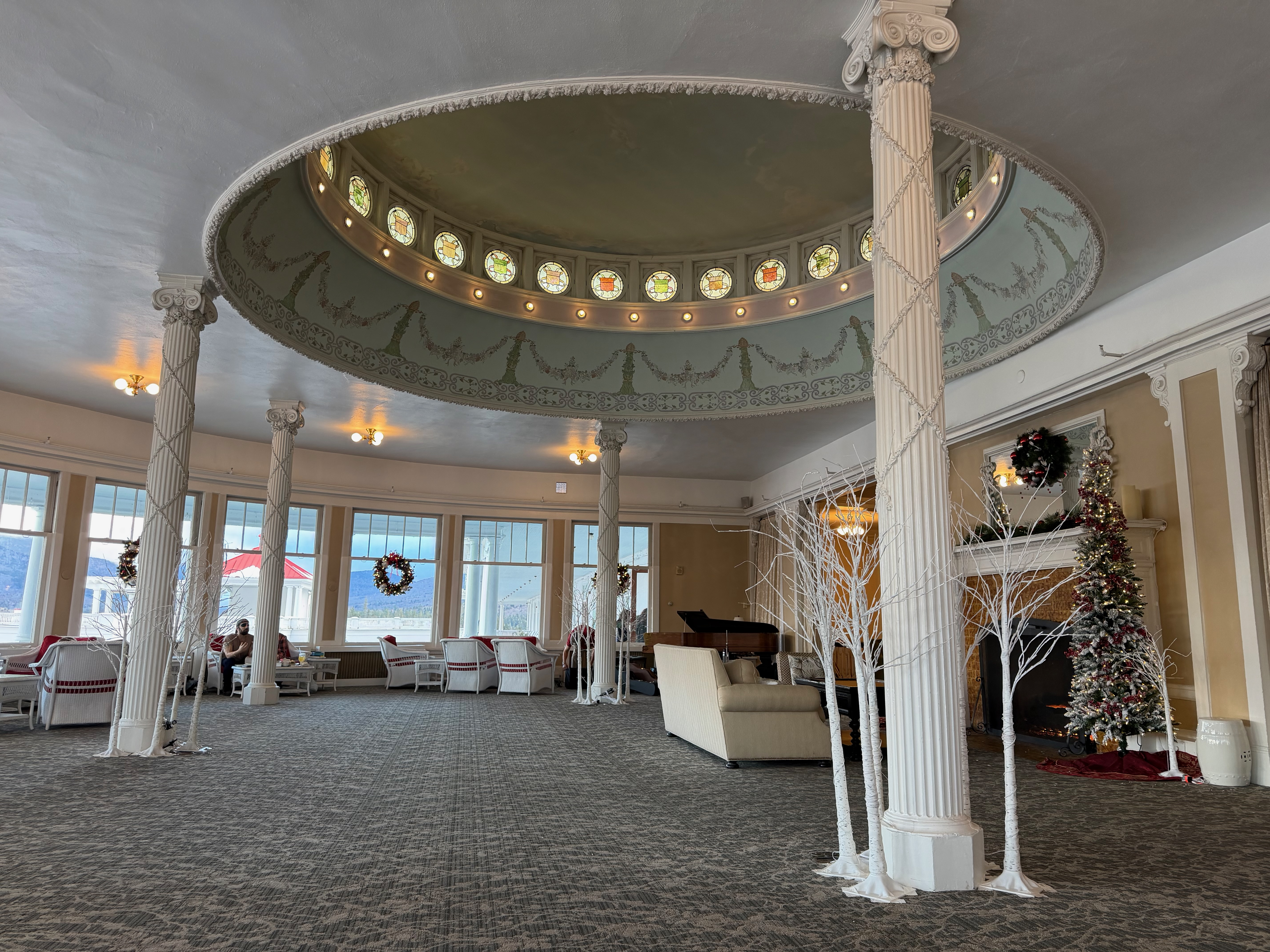
And in 2025

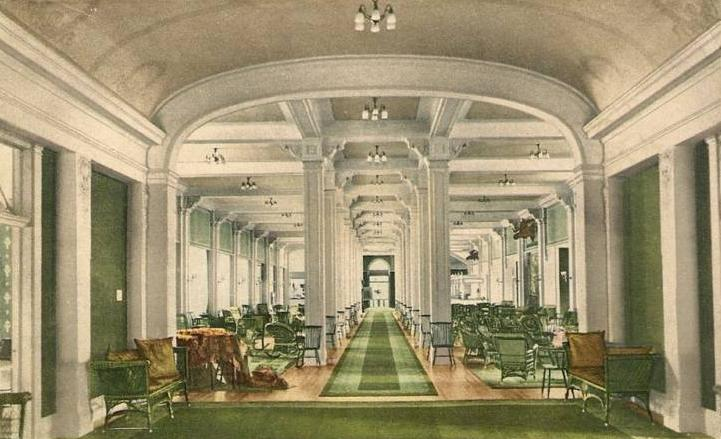
Assembly Hall, looking from the Ballroom c. 1910

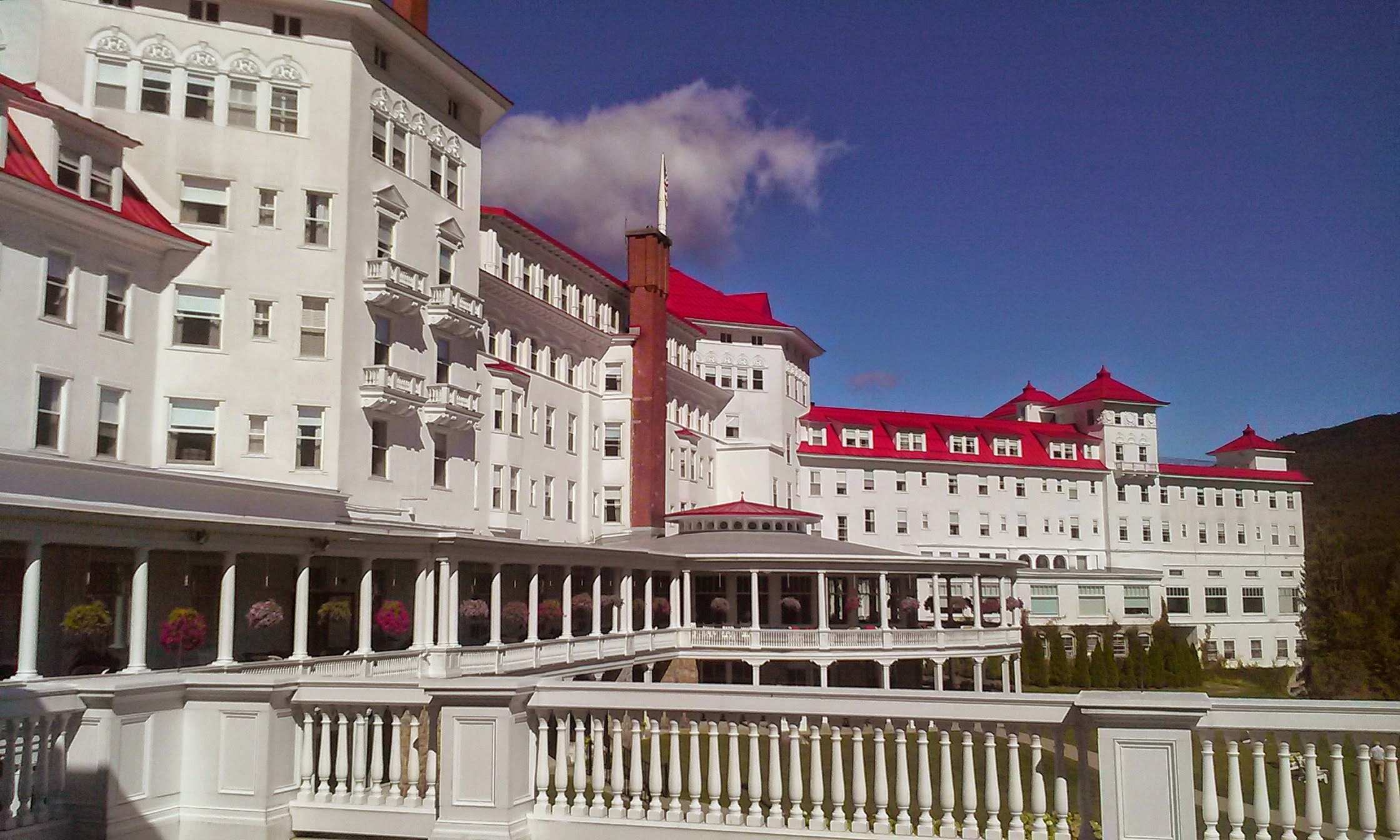
Presidential Wing view, 2014

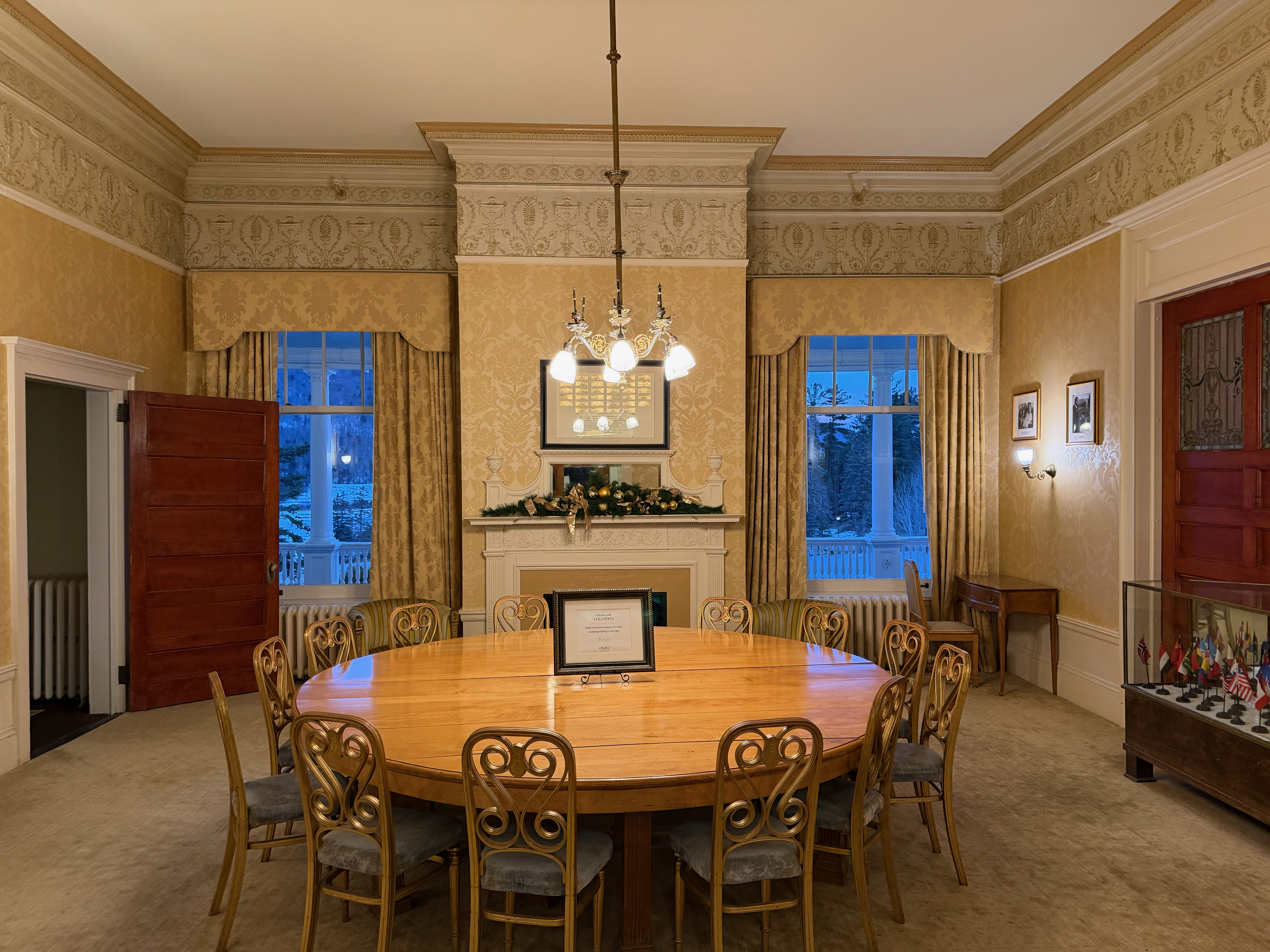
The Gold Room, where the International Monetary Fund and World Bank were established during the 1944 Bretton Woods Conference

== Omni Bretton Arms Inn ==
- Bretton Arms
- U.S. Historic district – Contributing property
- Location: Bretton Woods, New Hampshire
- Coordinates: 44°15′26″N 71°26′40″W
- Website: Official website
- Part of: Mount Washington Resort

The Omni Bretton Arms Inn is a hotel in the larger resort which was built as a house in 1896. The Bretton Arms served as staff housing for many years.

It has been separately named to the Historic Hotels of America program of the National Trust for Historic Preservation.

== See also ==
- List of Historic Hotels of America
- List of National Historic Landmarks in New Hampshire
- National Register of Historic Places listings in Coos County, New Hampshire
