= Joseph Stickney =

Joseph Stickney (1840–1903) was a wealthy coal broker, hotelier, and socialite, mostly active in Pennsylvania. He was a native of Concord, New Hampshire, and made a fortune before the age of thirty by investing in the coal business.

== Biography ==
Stickney was born on May 31, 1840, in Concord, New Hampshire, to Joseph Pearson Stickney (1796–1877) and Lucretia Gibson Stickney (1809–1840). In 1881, Stickney and his partner, John N. Conyngham, purchased the large Mount Pleasant Hotel, in the White Mountains region of New Hampshire, from lumberman John T. G. Leavitt. It was later demolished. In 1894, he married Carolyn S. Foster (1869–1936) of Waltham, Massachusetts. There were no children from the union.

Stickney constructed the luxurious Mount Washington Hotel in Bretton Woods, New Hampshire, which opened in 1902, the year before his death. The Mount Washington is one of the few surviving grand hotels of the Gilded Age.

Stickney died on December 21, 1903 from a stroke of apoplexy in New York City. In 1913, his widow Carolyn Foster Stickney was remarried to Aymon de Faucigny-Lucinge (1862–1922), a French aristocrat.

Stickney was the subject of a September 2019 episode of the podcast Lore.

== See also ==
- Find a Grave
