= Old Glynn County Courthouse =

- U.S. National Register of Historic Places
- U.S. Historic district – Contributing property
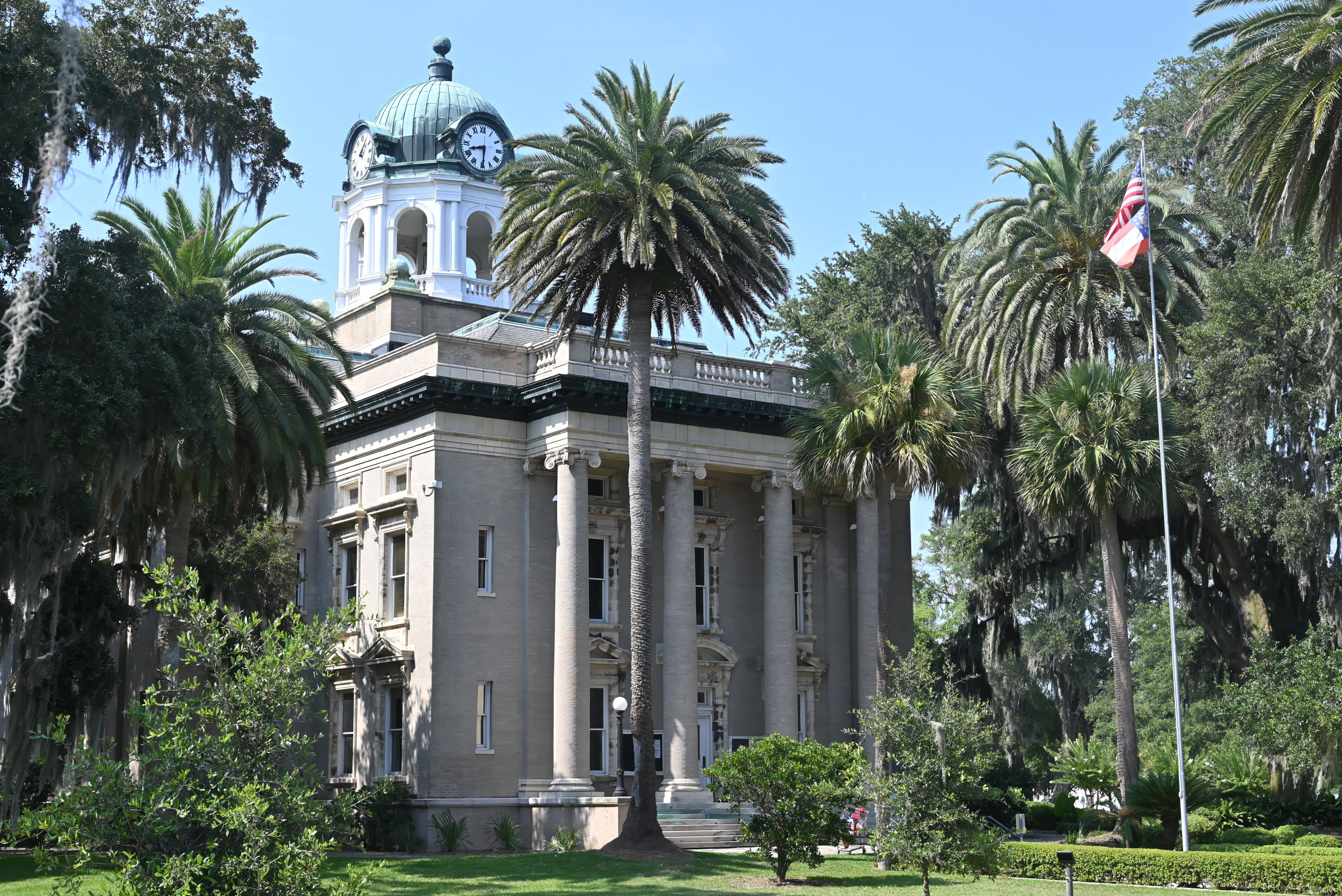
- Old Glynn County Courthouse (2023)

- Location within Georgia Location within the United States
- Interactive map showing the location of old Glynn County Courthouse
- Location: 701 G Street; Brunswick, Georgia
- Coordinates: 31°9′10″N 81°29′40″W
- Built: 1907
- Architect: Charles Alling Gifford
- Architectural style: Renaissance Revival
- Part of: Brunswick Old Town Historic District
- NRHP reference No.: 79000727
- Added to NRHP: April 26, 1979

The Old Glynn County Courthouse, also known as the Historic Brunswick Courthouse, is a historic courthouse in Brunswick, Georgia. The building, designed by architect Charles Alling Gifford, was constructed between 1906 and 1907. The building is a contributing property to the Brunswick Old Town Historic District.

== History ==
=== Background ===
There is evidence of a courthouse building constructed in Brunswick, Georgia some time before 1829, and while the ultimate fate of this building is unknown, it most likely burned down. Following this, court activities were held in rented spaces until 1884, when a wooden courthouse was constructed. The building's construction coincided with a growth in activity of the Port of Brunswick, and several years later, in 1892, a new city hall building designed by Alfred Eichberg was constructed. This city hall contained courtrooms that served the city court as well as the county court for Glynn County. There is evidence that in 1897, plans were put forward to construct a new courthouse designed by Frank Pierce Milburn, but a failure by the city to secure a bond issue caused the project to die.

=== Construction ===
Construction on a new county courthouse began in 1906, with New York City-based Charles Alling Gifford serving as the project's architect. Gifford had previously designed much of the Jekyll Island Club, which is also located in Glynn County. On June 20 of that year, city officials accepted construction proposals for the building based on Gifford's design. Construction was completed in 1907. The new building today is part of the Brunswick Old Town Historic District, a historic district listed on the National Register of Historic Places.

=== Modifications and restoration ===
During the 1970s energy crisis, the exterior of the building was covered by a façade to increase energy efficiency. Additional modifications to the building over the next several decades included the installation of sound boards for soundproofing and dropped ceilings. In 1991, a new courthouse was built in an adjacent block, partially replacing this building.

Afterward, the old courthouse building began to undergo a series of renovations aimed at returning the building to its historic condition. Phase I of the renovations, which included stabilizing the structure and replacing the copper dome, cost approximately $1 million. In 2001, the renovations entered into Phase II, which cost approximately $1.2 million and included the installation of fire detection and prevention systems; also, the building was brought up to compliance with the Americans with Disabilities Act of 1990. Following the Phase II renovations, the old courthouse served as the meeting place for the county commission. After this, a Phase III (with a cost of between $1 million and $1.5 million) focused on interior renovations.

As of 2019, due to a lack of space at the new facility, the Old Glynn County Courthouse houses the county's probate court.

== Architecture ==
The building, although laid out in a cross-like shape similar to Southern Neoclassical Revival courthouses, is primarily influenced by American Renaissance Revival architecture. The foundation for the building consists of 24-inch (61 cm) thick granite footers. The building features a brick exterior, limestone stoops at the entrances, and terracotta window-frames. The courtrooms feature balconies, built as a result of racial segregation in the United States.

The building is surrounded by southern live oak trees covered with Spanish moss that partially obscure the building. According to one historian, "the effect of this building today is moody and nostalgic, recalling not the pure light of the Renaissance but a shadowy classical ruin, more emotionally poignant and appropriately Southern than any new structure."

== See also ==
- List of county courthouses in Georgia
- National Register of Historic Places listings in Glynn County, Georgia

== Bibliography ==
- Caldwell, Wilber W. (2001). The Courthouse and the Depot: The Architecture of Hope in an Age of Despair (1st ed.). Mercer University Press. ISBN 978-0-86554-748-3 – via Google Books.
- "Building News". The American Architect and Building News. LXXXIX (1588): v–ix. June 2, 1906 – via Google Books.
