= Bretton Woods Mountain Resort =

Ski area in New Hampshire, United States

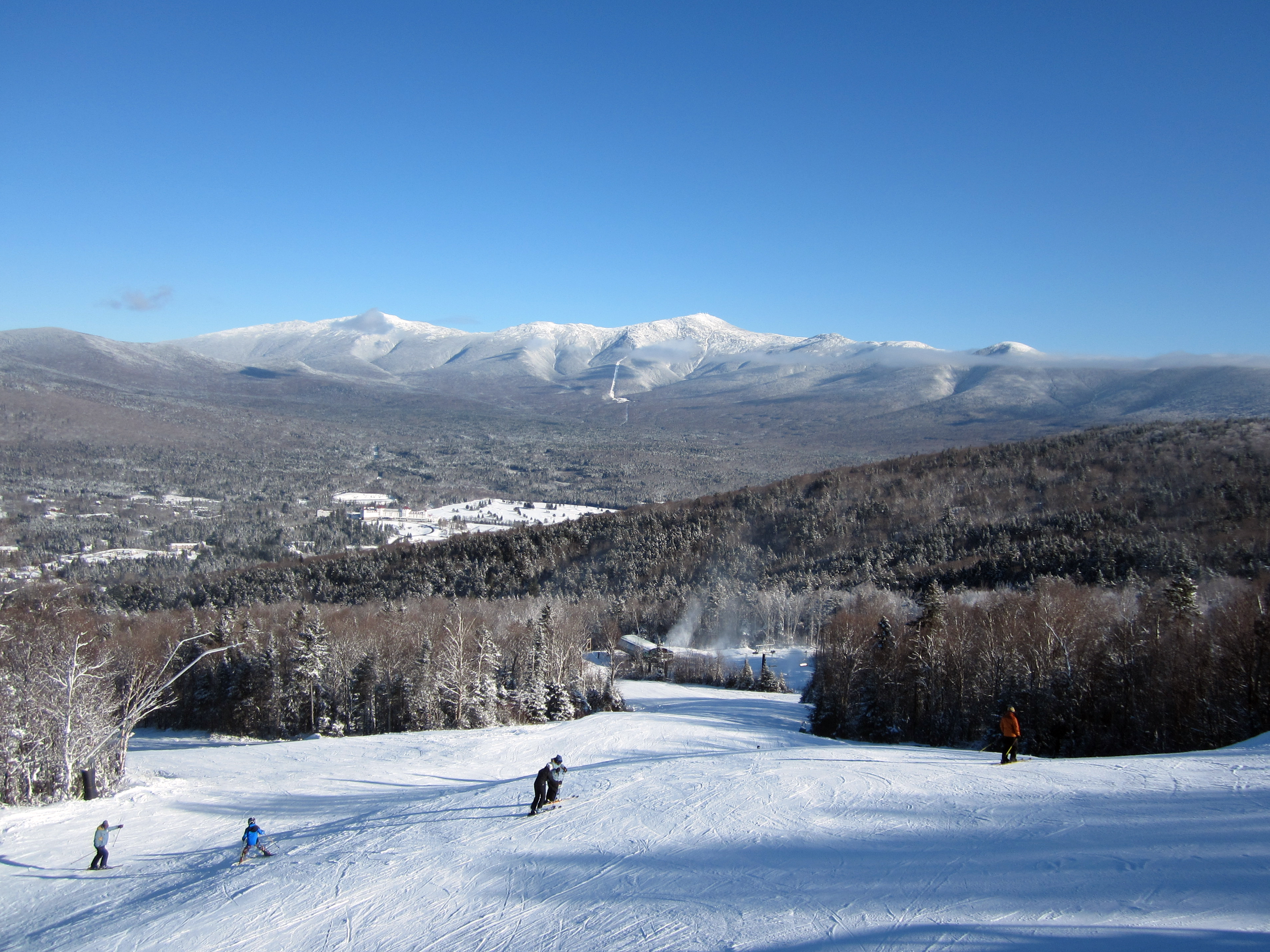
- Bretton Woods Mountain Resort in December 2011

- Location in New Hampshire
- Location: Bretton Woods, New Hampshire, USA
- Nearest city: Berlin, New Hampshire
- Coordinates: 44°15′35″N 71°27′44″W
- Vertical: 1,500 feet (460 m)
- Top elevation: 3,100 feet (940 m)
- Base elevation: 1,600 feet (490 m)
- Skiable area: 468 acres (189 ha)
- Trails: 102; 25% Beginner; 29% Intermediate; 46% Expert
- Longest run: 2.5 m (8 ft 2 in)
- Lift system: 9 total: 1 Gondola; 4 High Speed Quads; 1 Quad; 1 T-Bar; 2 Magic Carpet
- Lift capacity: 17,000 skiers/hour
- Terrain parks: 1
- Snowfall: 200 inches (5.1 m)
- Snowmaking: 92%
- Night skiing: No
- Website: brettonwoods.com

Bretton Woods Mountain Resort is a ski area located in Bretton Woods, New Hampshire, across from the Mount Washington Hotel, which owns it.

== Location and terrain ==
The resort is located on U.S. Route 302 in the White Mountains of New Hampshire. The terrain occupies 464 acres (1.88 km^{2}) adjacent to the White Mountain National Forest. 92% of the trails have snowmaking. There are 99 trails currently, and the resort receives an average of over 200 inches (5,100 mm) of snow per year. The resort includes 9 lifts, four of which are high speed quads. Bretton woods also includes a gondola. They run at a capacity of 14,000 people per hour.

=== Ski lifts ===
Bretton Woods has seven chairlifts and two magic carpets.

Name	Type	Builder	Built	Vertical (feet)	Length (feet)	Notes
Skyway	Gondola 8	Doppelmayr	2019	1298	5861	Only 8 passenger gondola in New Hampshire.
Rosebrook	High-Speed Quad	Doppelmayr	2003	556	2455	
West Mountain	High-Speed Quad	Doppelmayr	2002	826	3802	
Zephyr	High-Speed Quad	Garaventa-CTEC	2000	1063	4160	
BEQ II	High-Speed Quad	Leitner-Poma	2025	976	4723	Replaced 1989-built Bethlehem Express Quad
Learning Center	Quad	Doppelmayr	2002	89	828	
Telegraph	T-Bar	Doppelmayr	2012	394	2264	

== On-mountain food ==
Eateries around the ski area include the Top O' Quad Restaurant, Maple Leaf BBQ, West Mountain BBQ, the Food Court, The Switchback Grill, and the Sugar Shack.

== Awards ==
In the 2013/2014 SKI Magazine Reader's Poll, Bretton Woods was named #1 in the East for snow, grooming, service, and weather. Also, Bretton Woods was chosen as the #12 ski resort in the world and the #6 ski resort in the U.S. and Canada by the readers of Condé Nast Traveler. Bretton Woods was named #1 in New Hampshire for lifts, lodging, and dining, and overall ski resort. Bretton Woods was also named Top 5 in the East for family programs and scenery and Top 10 in the East for on mountain food.
