= Bretton Woods, New Hampshire =

Unincorporated community in New Hampshire, United States

- Unincorporated community
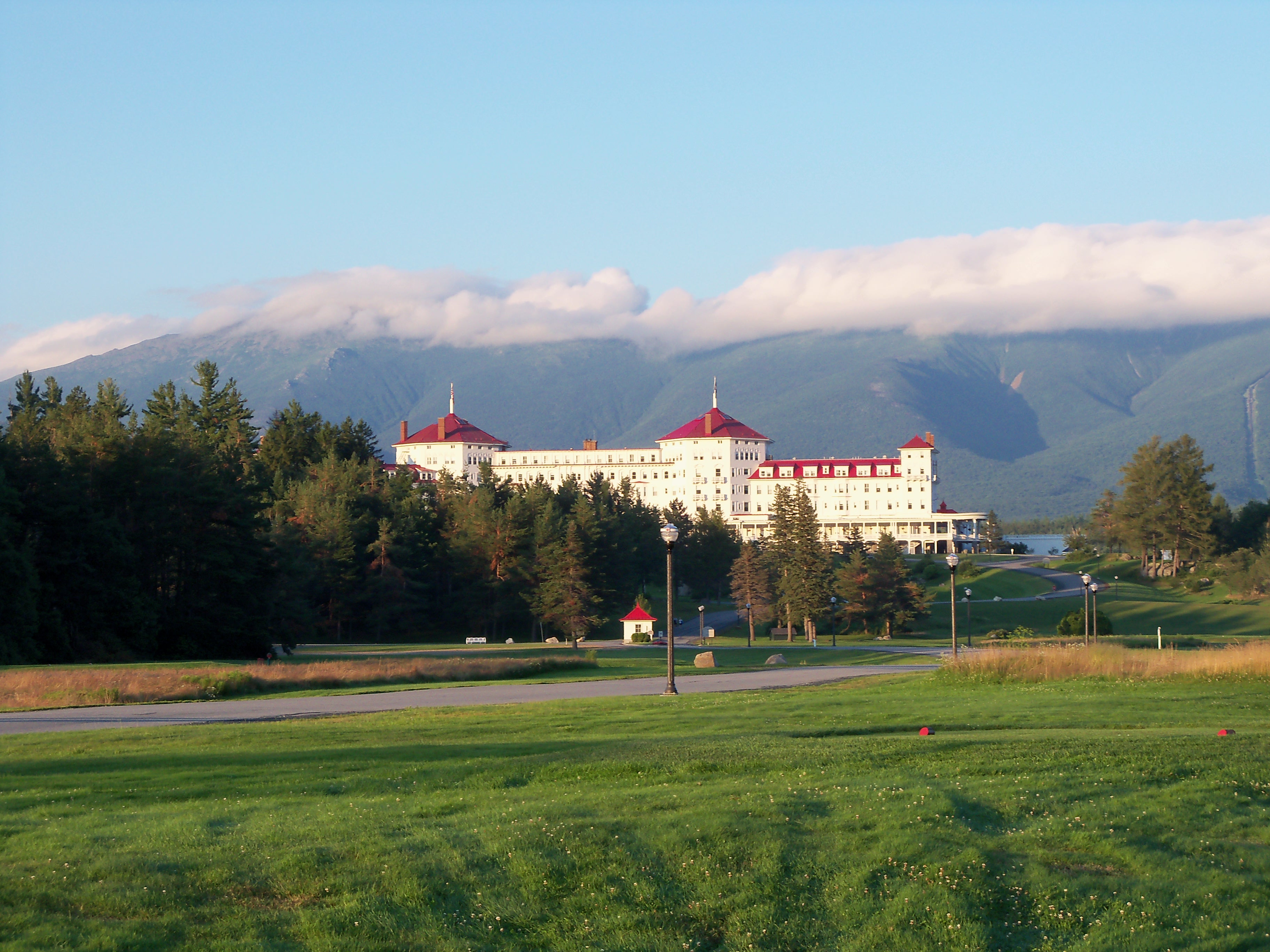
- Mount Washington Hotel at the foot of the Presidential Range in September 2010, looking east

- Location within New Hampshire Location within the United States
- Coordinates: 44°15′29″N 71°26′28″W
- Country: United States
- State: New Hampshire
- County: Coos
- Town: Carroll
- Elevation: 1,631 ft (497 m)
- Time zone: UTC-5 (Eastern (EST))
  - Summer (DST): UTC-4 (EDT)
- ZIP code: 03575
- Area code: 603
- GNIS feature ID: 865781

Bretton Woods is an area within the town of Carroll, New Hampshire, United States, whose principal points of interest are three leisure and recreation facilities. Being virtually surrounded by the White Mountain National Forest, the vista from Bretton Woods toward Mount Washington and the Presidential Range includes no significant artificial structures other than the Mount Washington Cog Railway and the Mount Washington Hotel.

Bretton Woods is located along U.S. Route 302, 5 miles (8 km) east of the village of Twin Mountain and 20 miles (32 km) through scenic Crawford Notch northwest of the town of Bartlett.

== History ==
In 1772, King George III granted Sir Thomas Wentworth of Bretton Hall, a country house in West Bretton, West Yorkshire, and 82 others, a parcel of 24,640 acres (9,970 ha) of land to be laid out as a plantation in the White Mountains. The plantation became the town of Carroll, and the southeast corner of the land retained the name "Bretton Woods", after the estate.

Bretton Woods was the site of the United Nations Monetary and Financial Conference in 1944 which has given its name to the Bretton Woods system and led to the establishment of both the World Bank and the International Monetary Fund in 1945. The Bretton Woods system ended in 1971.

== Points of interest ==
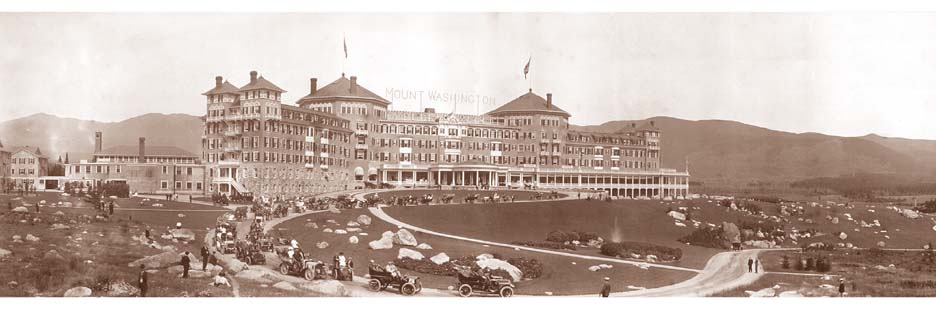
The Mount Washington Hotel in 1905

The Mount Washington Hotel and Resort is one in the last surviving handful of New Hampshire grand hotels, and includes two golf courses, alpine and Nordic skiing, a 25,000-square-foot (2,300 m^{2}) spa, sled rides, dog sled rides, tennis, horseback riding and much more in its facilities.

The Bretton Woods Mountain Resort ski area serves both downhill and cross-country skiing, primarily in the Rosebrook Mountains, located in Bethlehem to the south. The downhill resort is the largest in New Hampshire, with 101 trails. In the early twentieth century heyday of northern U.S. resorts for the elite, rail passengers would travel from Boston on the Boston and Maine's Mountaineer. From New York City, passengers took the Connecticut Yankee, Day White Mountains, Night White Mountains, or Overnighter.

The tracks of the Cog Railway and its associated buildings lie up the slope of Mount Washington, in nearby Thompson and Meserve's Purchase. The "Base Road" from Bretton Woods and Fabyan's is the preferred route to the lower end of the tracks (the Base Station of the Cog), except in those winters when the Mount Clinton Road is instead the only plowed road to their intersection. (The closing of the lower end of the Base Road had been traditional into 2004.) The Cog was operated during the winter seasons of 2004 to 2006 to take wilderness skiers partway up the mountain.

== See also ==
- Bretton Woods Conference
