= Baldpate Mountain (Maine) =

Mountain in Maine, United States of America

Baldpate Mountain (East Peak)
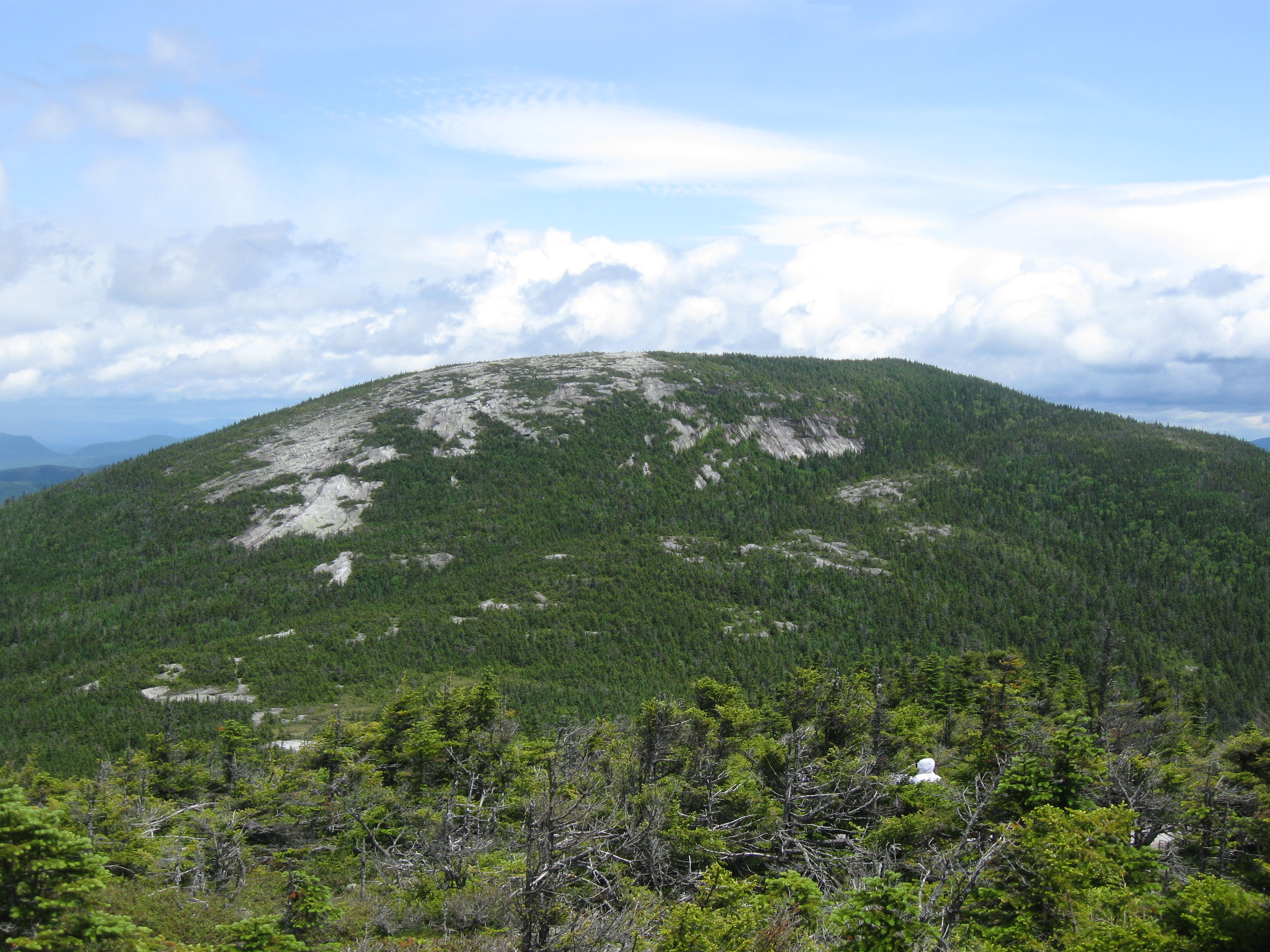
- East Baldpate as seen from West Baldpate.

Highest point
- Elevation: 3,815 ft (1,163 m)
- Prominence: 2,263 ft (690 m)
- Listing: New England Fifty Finest #28; New England 100 Highest #95
- Coordinates: 44°36′33″N 70°53′33″W

Geography
- Location within Maine
- Location: Oxford County, Maine
- Parent range: Mahoosuc Range
- Topo map: USGS Old Speck Mountain

Climbing
- Easiest route: Appalachian Trail

Baldpate Mountain is a mountain located in Oxford County, Maine. Baldpate has two prominent peaks: East Peak has 3,815 feet (1,163 m) of elevation; and West Peak has 3,662 feet (1,116 m) of elevation and stands 267 feet (81 m) above the col between them.

Baldpate is flanked to the north by Surplus Mountain, to the northeast by Black Mountain, and to the southeast by Mount Hittie. To the southwest, Baldpate Mountain faces Old Speck Mountain across Grafton Notch, which by convention marks the northeast end of the Mahoosuc Range.

Baldpate Mountain is within the watershed of the Androscoggin River, which drains into Merrymeeting Bay, the estuary of the Kennebec River, and then into the Gulf of Maine. The northwest side of Baldpate Mountain drains into the Swift Cambridge River, then into the Dead Cambridge River and Umbagog Lake, the source of the Androscoggin River. The southeast and southwest sides of Baldpate drain into the Bear River, then into the Androscoggin. The northeast side of Baldpate Mtn. drains into the West Branch of the Ellis River, then into the Androscoggin.

The Appalachian Trail, a 2,170 mi (3,490 km) National Scenic Trail from Georgia to Maine, runs from Grafton Notch to Surplus Mountain across both peaks of Baldpate.

== Climate ==
Climate data for Baldpate Mountain 44.6109 N, 70.8910 W, Elevation: 3,593 ft (1,095 m) (1991–2020 normals)
Month	Jan	Feb	Mar	Apr	May	Jun	Jul	Aug	Sep	Oct	Nov	Dec	Year
Mean daily maximum °F (°C)	19.8 (−6.8)	22.7 (−5.2)	29.0 (−1.7)	43.3 (6.3)	56.2 (13.4)	64.9 (18.3)	69.6 (20.9)	68.5 (20.3)	62.2 (16.8)	49.6 (9.8)	36.5 (2.5)	25.4 (−3.7)	45.6 (7.6)
Daily mean °F (°C)	12.0 (−11.1)	13.9 (−10.1)	20.2 (−6.6)	33.5 (0.8)	45.4 (7.4)	54.3 (12.4)	59.0 (15.0)	57.8 (14.3)	51.6 (10.9)	40.3 (4.6)	29.0 (−1.7)	16.7 (−8.5)	36.1 (2.3)
Mean daily minimum °F (°C)	4.1 (−15.5)	5.2 (−14.9)	11.4 (−11.4)	23.8 (−4.6)	34.6 (1.4)	43.7 (6.5)	48.4 (9.1)	47.0 (8.3)	41.0 (5.0)	31.0 (−0.6)	21.5 (−5.8)	8.0 (−13.3)	26.6 (−3.0)
Average precipitation inches (mm)	3.94 (100)	4.11 (104)	4.02 (102)	4.90 (124)	6.42 (163)	6.06 (154)	5.16 (131)	5.53 (140)	5.30 (135)	7.84 (199)	5.28 (134)	5.86 (149)	64.42 (1,635)
Source: PRISM Climate Group

== See also ==
- List of mountains in Maine
- New England Hundred Highest
- New England Fifty Finest
