= Success, New Hampshire =

Township in Coos County, New Hampshire, United States

- Township
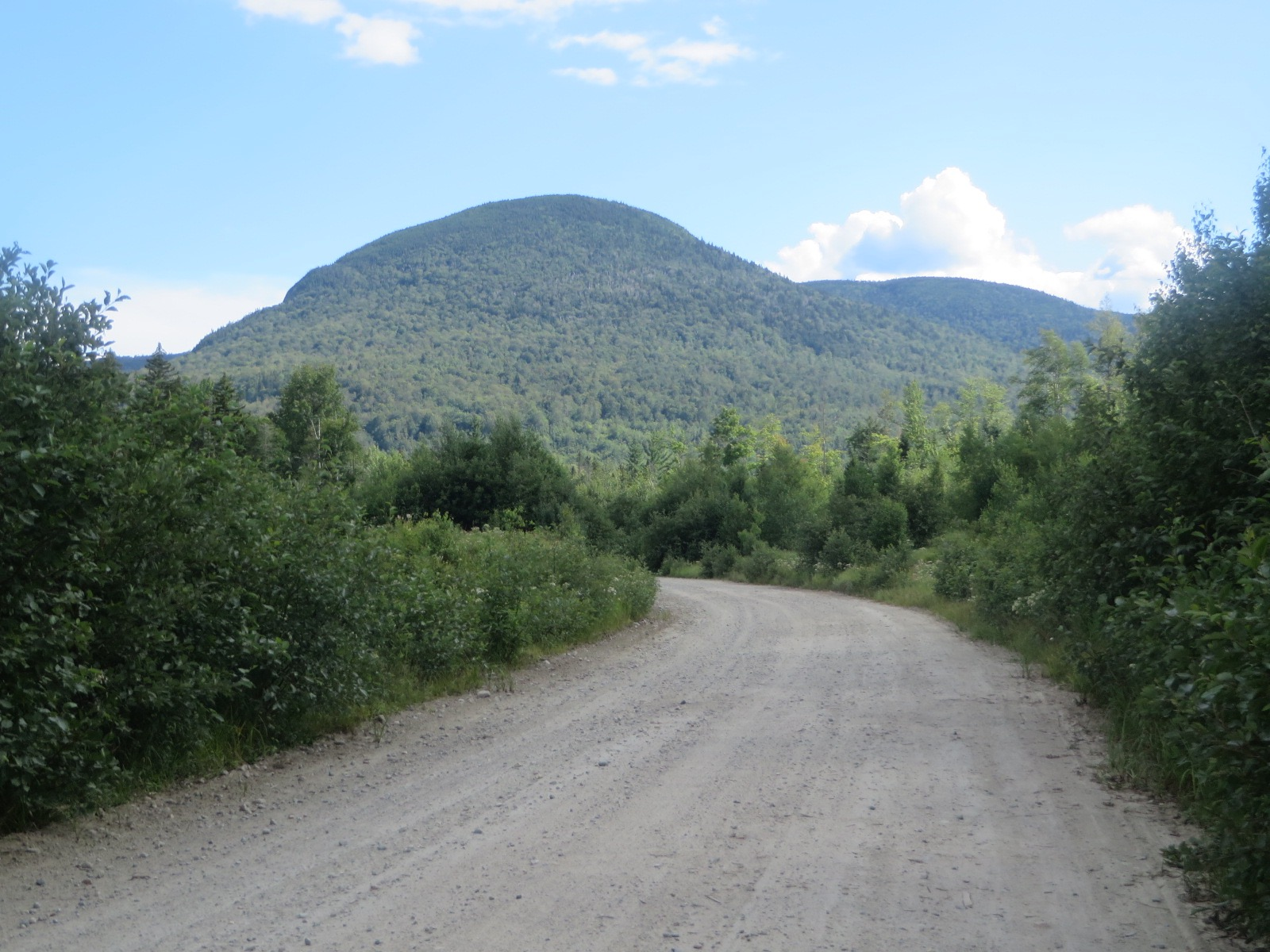
- North Bald Cap as seen from Success Pond Road

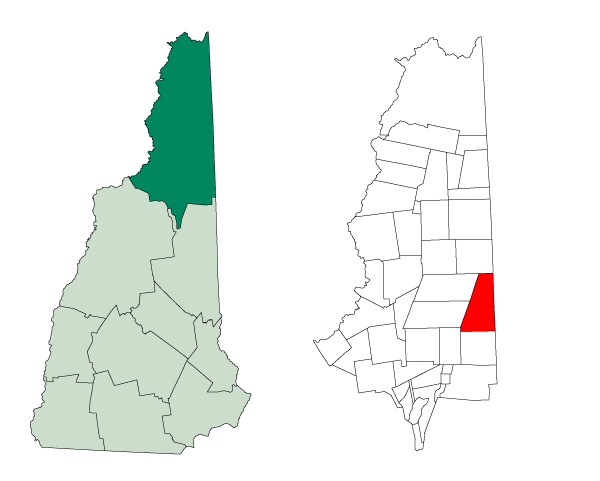
- Location in Coös County, New Hampshire
- Coordinates: 44°30′52″N 71°4′26″W
- Country: United States
- State: New Hampshire
- County: Coös

Area
  - Total: 57.01 sq mi (147.66 km^{2})
  - Land: 56.50 sq mi (146.33 km^{2})
  - Water: 0.52 sq mi (1.34 km^{2}) 0.91%
- Elevation: 1,740 ft (530 m)

Population (2020)
  - Total: 4
  - Density: 0.078/sq mi (0.03/km^{2})
- Time zone: UTC-5 (Eastern)
  - Summer (DST): UTC-4 (Eastern)
- Area code: 603
- FIPS code: 33-007-74500
- GNIS feature ID: 871136

Success is an unincorporated township in Coös County, New Hampshire, United States. It is located directly to the east of the city of Berlin, and borders on the state of Maine. Success is part of the Berlin, NH-VT Micropolitan Statistical Area.

As of the 2020 census, the township had a population of four. There are seasonal homes, cabins, and cottages mainly located around Success Pond, which give the township an additional small seasonal population.

As of 2005, one of the larger landowners in Success was the Androscoggin Valley Regional Refuse Disposal District.

== History ==
Success was granted in 1773 and contained about 90,472 acres (366.1 km^{2}). The grantees were Benjamin Mackay and about seventy others.

=== Blanchard and Twitchell Railroad ===
A railroad was built by Blanchard and Twitchell Company in 1892 from the Boston and Maine Railroad in Berlin through the aboriginal forests to Success Pond in the northeast corner of the township. Six locomotives transported lumber and logs to Berlin sawmills over the 26-mile (42 km) railway. Most of the Success township forests were gone within a decade, but the railway operated after 1904 as the George W. Blanchard and Sons Company Railroad, as Cassius M. C. Twitchell had sold his interest in the business in 1901. The Boston and Maine kept 1,600 feet (490 m) of interchange track in service when the remainder of the railroad was dismantled in 1907.

== Geography ==
According to the United States Census Bureau, the township has a total area of 57.0 square miles (147.7 km^{2}), of which 56.5 square miles (146.3 km^{2}) are land and 0.50 square miles (1.3 km^{2}), or 0.91%, are water. The entire township is part of the Androscoggin River watershed. Success Pond is in the north, and is drained by Chickwolnepy Stream. Stearns Brook drains the center of the township, through its North and South Branches and Meadow Brook. The Mahoosuc Range crosses the southern part of the township, draining north via Horne Brook and Bean Brook, to the west via Cascade Alpine Brook, and to the south by several small brooks, all flowing to the Androscoggin River.

The highest point in the township is the summit of Mount Success, with an elevation of 3,565 feet (1,087 m) above sea level, in the southeast part of the township along the crest of the Mahoosucs. The Appalachian Trail follows the Mahoosuc crest across the township.

=== Adjacent municipalities ===
- Cambridge (north)
- North Oxford, Maine (east)
- Shelburne (south)
- Gorham (southwest)
- Berlin (west)
- Milan (northwest)

== Demographics ==
Historical population
Census	Pop.	Note	%±
1830	14		—
1860	11		—
1870	5		−54.5%
1900	220		—
1920	8		—
1930	0		−100.0%
1940	1		—
1950	0		−100.0%
1960	0		—
1970	2		—
1980	0		−100.0%
1990	0		—
2000	2		—
2010	0		−100.0%
2020	4		—
U.S. Decennial Census

As of the 2010 census, there were no people living in the township, although there are a number of summer homes mainly on the shores around Success Pond.
