= Northeast Airlines Flight 792 =

1954 airliner crashed in New Hampshire

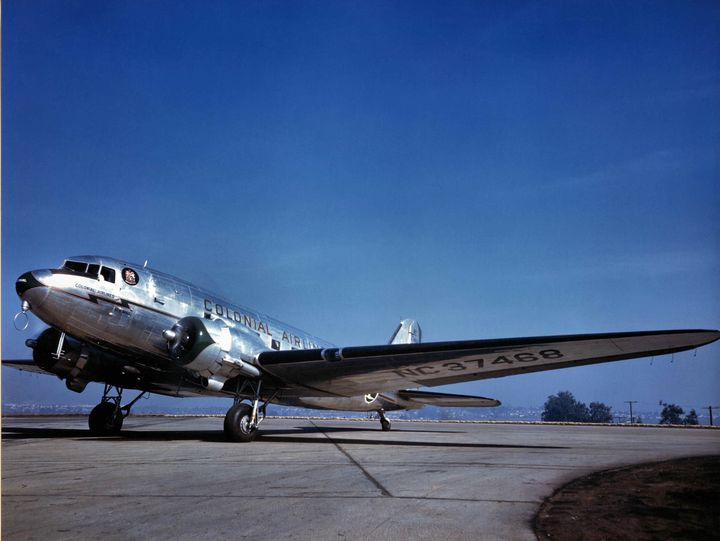
- A Douglas DC-3 similar to the one involved

Accident
- Date: November 30, 1954
- Summary: Crashed on approach in snowstorm due to pilot error
- Site: Mount Success, Coös County, New Hampshire, United States

Aircraft
- Aircraft type: Douglas DC-3
- Operator: Northeast Airlines
- Registration: N17891
- Flight origin: Logan International Airport, Boston, Massachusetts, United States
- Stopover: Laconia Municipal Airport, Concord, New Hampshire, United States
- Destination: Berlin Regional Airport, Coös County, New Hampshire, United States
- Occupants: 7
- Passengers: 3
- Crew: 4
- Fatalities: 2
- Injuries: 5
- Survivors: 5

Northeast Airlines Flight 792 was a scheduled domestic flight from Boston, Massachusetts, to Berlin, New Hampshire, with a stopover at Concord, New Hampshire. On November 30, 1954, the Douglas DC-3 struck into the side of Mount Success during a snowstorm, jolted to a violent halt. Its left wing and propeller engine burst into flames. Survivors were huddling in the plane for 45 hours before being found by rescuers and volunteers.

== Occupants ==
The captain of the flight was W. Peter Carey, aged 37. He had been employed by Northeast Airlines as a captain since 1946. He had a total flight experience of 7,900 hours, 5,500 of which were in the DC-3.

The first officer was G.D. McCormick, also aged 37. He had been employed by Northeast Airlines since 1950. His piloting experience totaled 4,300 hours, 831 of which were in the DC-3.

The stewardess, Mary McEttrick, aged 23, had been employed by Northeast Airlines in June 1953 and had completed the company training course in emergency procedure.

Also on board was a company flight superintendent named John McNulty, aged 39.

The three passengers onboard were James W. Harvey, William Miller and Daniel Hall. They were all businessmen who often hopped on short flights throughout New England.

== Aircraft ==
The aircraft involved was a Douglas DC-3, manufactured in 1943. It was initially purchased from the United States Air Force (USAF) in 1945 and modified for civil use by AeroServices Inc. It had 26,000 flight hours and been at Northeast Airlines for 24,000 hours, registered as N17891.

== Accident ==
At 11:03, the flight crew asked for weather. As of the updated information at 11:10: scattered at 2,300 feet (700 m), overcast at 3,000 feet (910 m), 2 1/2 miles visibility - close to Berlin's minimum. The flight acknowledged the information, but did not give its altitude nor position. Meanwhile the flight was descending for a straight-in approach. The captain was able to recognize visual references on the ground until the plane entered the overcast, when it encountered a severe downdraft. In an effort to save the plane, the captain raised the nose of the plane, but it was too late. The plane lost 500 feet (150 m) of altitude and crashed into the snow-covered southern slope of Mount Success in the Mahoosuc mountain range.

== Rescue ==
After the crash, search and rescue began, but weather hampered efforts until December 2. Survivors were not found for 45 hours. They used the plane's fuselage for shelter. To stay warm, they wrapped themselves in cabin insulation, curtains, and soundproofing material. The passengers opened their suitcases and gave extra clothing to the crew. The passengers credited Stewardess McEttrick (nicknamed "Merry Mack") for "keeping everyone's spirits up". The company flight superintendent and co-pilot died from their injuries two hours after the impact. The other five people were eventually rescued by teams.

== Aftermath ==
The wreckage of the DC-3 is still on Mount Success today. It became a well-known site for hikers on the Appalachian Trail because the plane is still mostly intact.
