= Philbrook =

Philbrook is a locational surname of British origin. An alternative spelling is Philbrick. The surname spread to America when Thomas Philbrick emigrated to Massachusetts in 1633. The name may refer to:

- Frank Philbrook (1931–2017), Canadian politician
- George Philbrook (1884–1964), American athlete
- James Philbrook (1924–1982), American actor
- John M. Philbrook (1840–1923), American politician
- Mary Philbrook (1872–1958), American lawyer
- Simon Philbrook (born 1965), British cricket player
- Warren C. Philbrook (1857–1933), American politician

== See also ==
- Philbrook, Minnesota
- Philbrook Farm Inn, New Hampshire
- Philbrook Museum of Art, Oklahoma
- Samuel D. Philbrook House, Maine
