= Philbrick =

Philbrick is a locational surname of British origin. An alternative spelling is Philbrook. The surname spread to America when Thomas Philbrick emigrated to Massachusetts in 1633. The name may refer to:

- Clancy Philbrick (born 1986), American artist
- David Philbrick Conner (born 1949), American businessman
- Donald Philbrick (1937–2022), American politician
- Frank Philbrick (born 1978), American writer
- George A. Philbrick (1913–1974), American engineer
- Herbert Philbrick (1915–1993), American businessman
- Inigo Philbrick (born 1987/1988), American art dealer and convicted fraudster
- John Dudley Philbrick (1818–1886), American educator
- Joseph Philbrick Webster (1819–1875), American musician
- Nathaniel Philbrick (born 1956), American writer
- Rodman Philbrick (born 1951), American writer
- Stephen Philbrick (born 1949), American writer

== See also ==
- Philbrook
