= Grafton Notch =

Mountain pass in Maine, United States

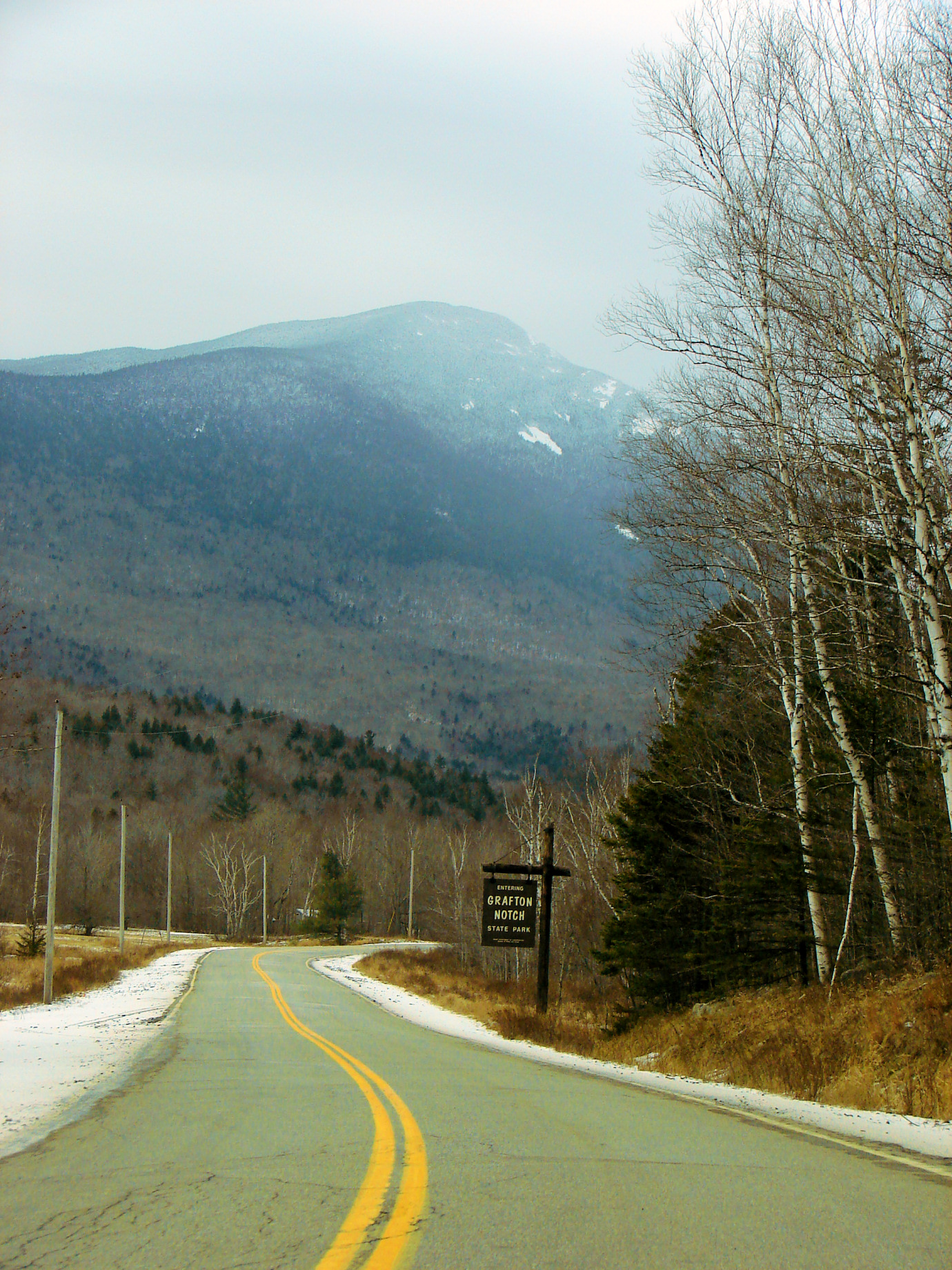

- Location within Maine
- Elevation: 1,542 ft (470 m)
- Traversed by: SR 26

Location
- Location: North Oxford, Oxford County, Maine, United States
- Range: Mahoosuc Range
- Coordinates: 44°35′48″N 70°56′49″W
- Topo map: USGS Old Speck Mountain

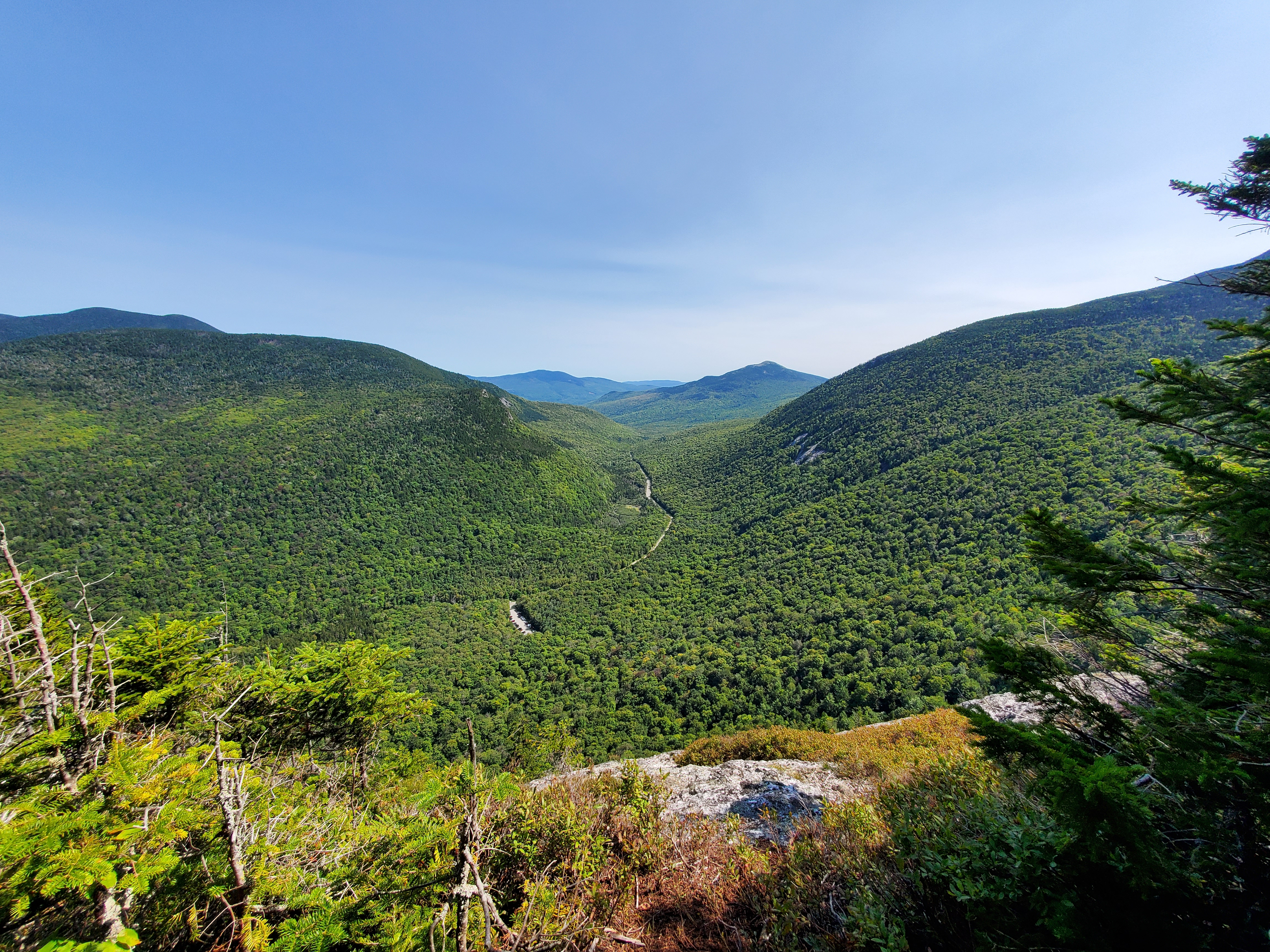
View of Grafton Notch from the top of the Eyebrow Loop Trail

Grafton Notch is a notch, or mountain pass, located in Oxford County, Maine. The notch demarks the northeastern end of the Mahoosuc Range, and thus of the White Mountains. Maine State Route 26 passes through the notch.

North of the drainage divide, the notch drains into the Swift Cambridge River, then into the Dead Cambridge River and Umbagog Lake, the source of the Androscoggin River, which drains into Merrymeeting Bay, the estuary of the Kennebec River, and thence into the Gulf of Maine. To the south, the notch drains into the Bear River, then into the Androscoggin.

Maine's Grafton Notch State Park includes the land along the bottom of the notch, and extends as far south as the summit of Old Speck Mountain on the southwest side of the notch. On the northeast side, it includes the lowest slopes of Baldpate Mountain.

The Appalachian Trail, a 2,170 miles (3,490 km) National Scenic Trail from Georgia to Maine, crosses the notch between Old Speck and Baldpate.
