= Goose Eye Mountain =

Mountain in Maine, United States of America

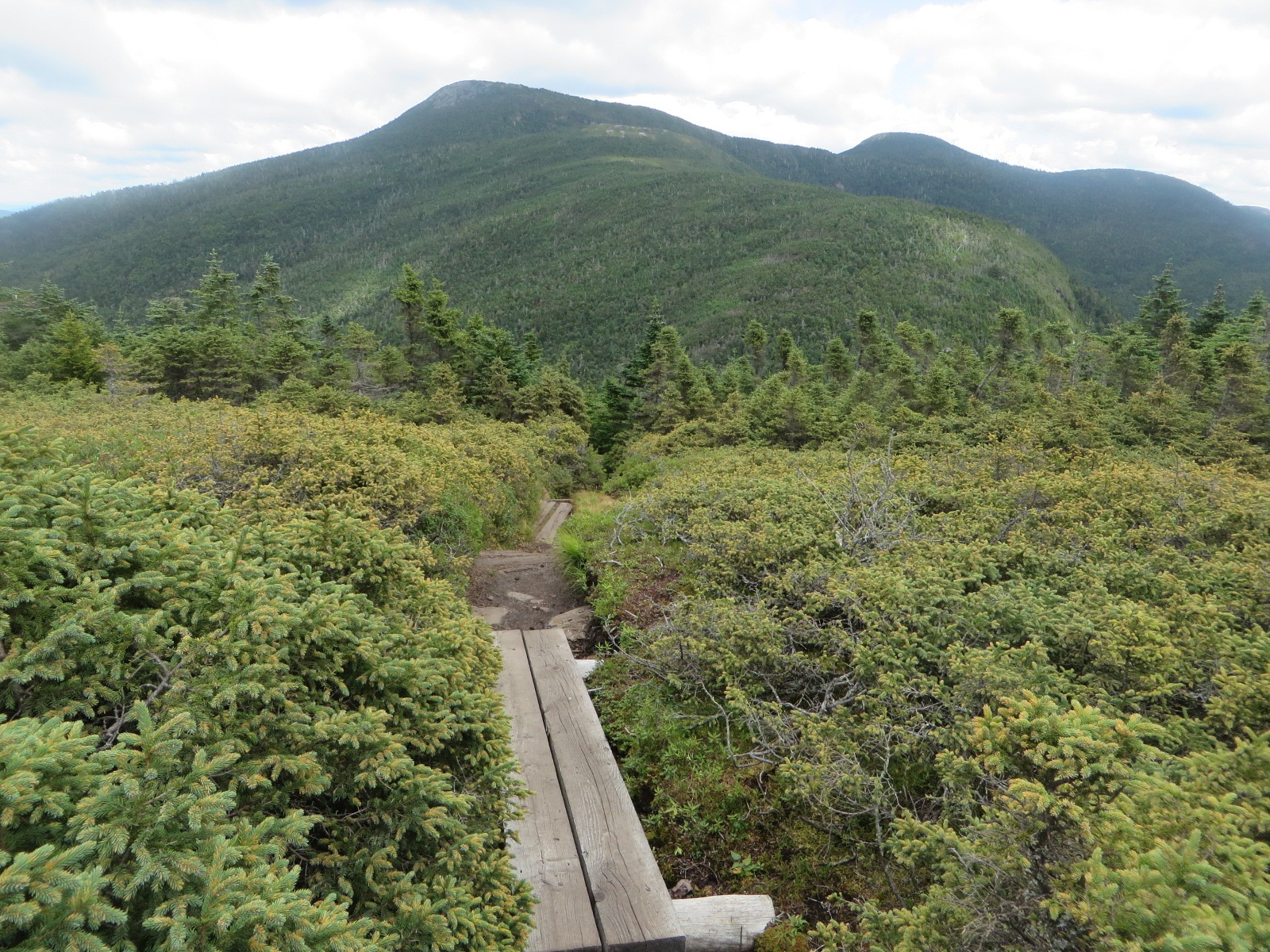
- Goose Eye from the southwest (Mahoosuc Trail)

Highest point
- Elevation: 3,860 ft (1,180 m)
- Prominence: 1,380 ft (420 m)
- Listing: New England 100 Highest #78
- Coordinates: 44°30′09″N 70°59′29″W

Geography
- Location within Maine
- Location: Oxford County, Maine, U.S.
- Parent range: Mahoosuc Range
- Topo map: USGS Old Speck Mountain

Goose Eye Mountain, also known as Mt. Goose High, is a mountain located in Oxford County, Maine, about 1 mi (1.6 km). (2 km) east of the New Hampshire-Maine border. The mountain is the second-highest peak of the Mahoosuc Range of the White Mountains.

== Description ==
Goose Eye Mountain is flanked to the northeast by Fulling Mill Mountain, and to the southwest by Mount Carlo.

Goose Eye Mountain stands within the watershed of the Androscoggin River, which wraps around the Mahoosuc Range and drains into Merrymeeting Bay, the estuary of the Kennebec River, and then into the Gulf of Maine. The south side of Goose Eye drains via various streams into Sunday River and the Androscoggin. The northeast side of Goose Eye drains into Goose Eye Brook, then into Sunday River. The west side of the mountain drains via various streams into the South Branch of Stearns Brook, and then into the Androscoggin.

The Appalachian Trail, a 2,170 mi (3,490 km) National Scenic Trail from Georgia to Maine, meets the Goose Eye Trail on the summit ridge of Goose Eye Mountain about 0.1 mi (0.16 km) east of the summit, and continues east and then north to the mountain's North Peak 3,675 ft (1,120 m).The mountain is ascended by the Goose Eye Trail, the Wright Trail, and the Mahoosuc Trail (which the Appalachian Trail follows in this area). The Goose Eye Trail is a popular dayhike in the summer and fall, as is the Wright Trail.

== See also ==
- Old Speck Mountain
- List of mountains in Maine
- New England Hundred Highest
