= Old Speck Mountain =

Mountain in Maine, United States

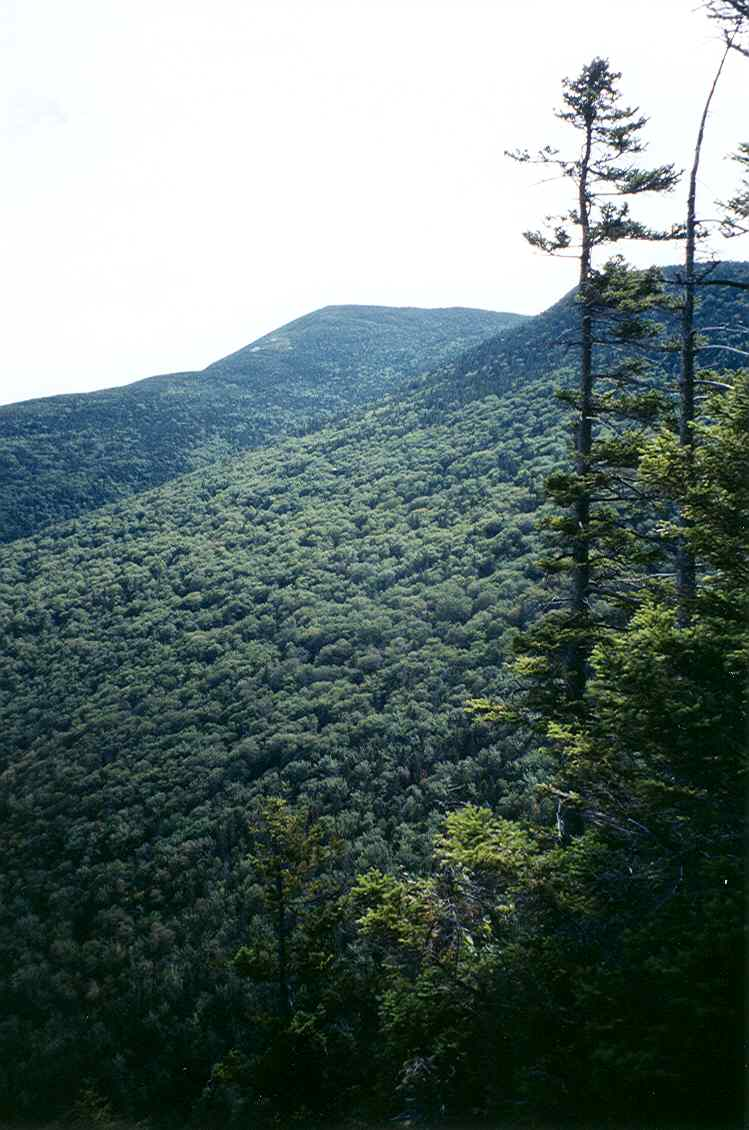
- Old Speck Mountain seen from Eyebrow Trail

Highest point
- Elevation: 4,170 ft (1,270 m)
- Prominence: 2,730 ft (830 m)
- Listing: New England 4000 footers #13 New England Fifty Finest
- Coordinates: 44°34.27′N 70°57.22′W

Geography
- Location within Maine
- Location: Oxford County, Maine, U.S.
- Parent range: Mahoosuc Range
- Topo map: USGS Old Speck Mountain

Old Speck Mountain, also known as Old Speckle Mountain, is a mountain located in Oxford County, Maine, United States. The mountain, the fourth-highest in the state, is the northeasternmost and highest of the Mahoosuc Range, the northeasternmost part of the White Mountains. Old Speck is flanked to the southwest by Mahoosuc Arm, and faces Baldpate Mountain to the northeast across Grafton Notch.

Old Speck is within the watershed of the Androscoggin River, which drains into Merrymeeting Bay, the estuary of the Kennebec River, and then into the Gulf of Maine. The north and east faces of Old Speck drain into the Bear River, then into the Androscoggin. The southeast and southwest faces drain into the Bull Branch of Goose Eye Brook, then into the Sunday River and the Androscoggin. The northwest face drains into Silver Stream, then into Chickwolnepy Stream and the Androscoggin.

The summit of Old Speck is on the southern boundary of Grafton Notch State Park. The Appalachian Trail, a 2,170-mile (3,490 km) National Scenic Trail from Georgia to Maine, runs along the Mahoosuc Range, 0.3 miles (0.5 km) west of the summit of Old Speck. A short side trail runs from the Appalachian Trail to the summit of the mountain. Speck Pond is located below the mountain's summit, at 3,400 feet (1,000 m), it is stocked with brook trout. The Appalachian Trail descends 1.1 miles (1.8 km) from a location near the summit of Old Speck Mountain to the pond. Of the 49 4000 Footers of the White Mountains, Old Speck is the only one in Maine.

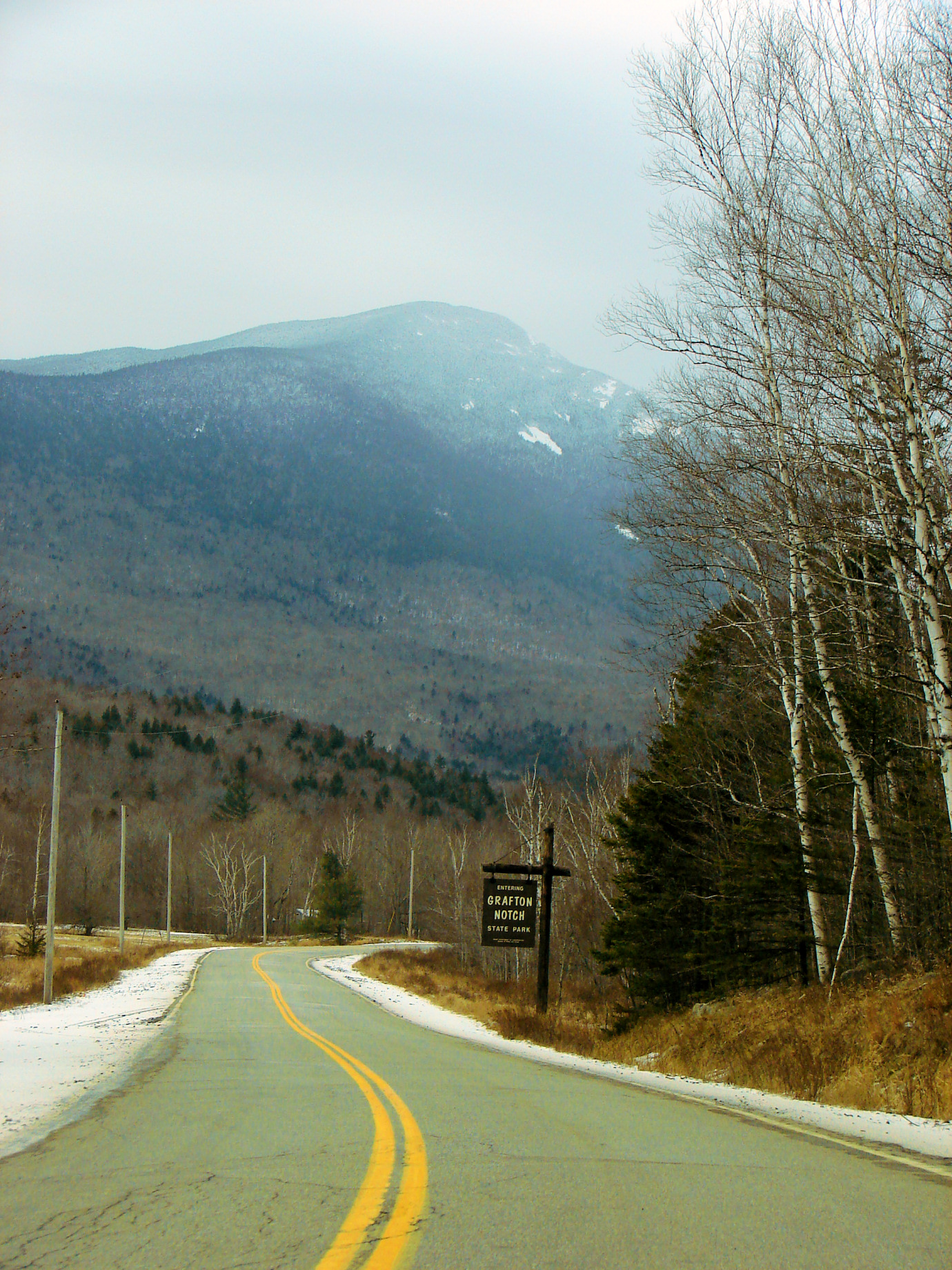
Old Speck Mountain seen from the bottom of Grafton Notch

== Climate ==
Climate data for Old Speck Mountain 44.5743 N, 70.9568 W, Elevation: 3,573 ft (1,089 m) (1991–2020 normals)
Month	Jan	Feb	Mar	Apr	May	Jun	Jul	Aug	Sep	Oct	Nov	Dec	Year
Mean daily maximum °F (°C)	19.8 (−6.8)	23.2 (−4.9)	29.5 (−1.4)	42.9 (6.1)	56.0 (13.3)	64.5 (18.1)	69.4 (20.8)	68.1 (20.1)	62.1 (16.7)	49.2 (9.6)	36.4 (2.4)	25.5 (−3.6)	45.6 (7.5)
Daily mean °F (°C)	12.1 (−11.1)	14.4 (−9.8)	20.5 (−6.4)	33.3 (0.7)	45.2 (7.3)	54.1 (12.3)	58.8 (14.9)	57.5 (14.2)	51.5 (10.8)	40.0 (4.4)	28.9 (−1.7)	18.2 (−7.7)	36.2 (2.3)
Mean daily minimum °F (°C)	4.4 (−15.3)	5.6 (−14.7)	11.5 (−11.4)	23.8 (−4.6)	34.5 (1.4)	43.6 (6.4)	48.2 (9.0)	46.9 (8.3)	40.9 (4.9)	30.9 (−0.6)	21.4 (−5.9)	10.9 (−11.7)	26.9 (−2.8)
Average precipitation inches (mm)	4.42 (112)	3.93 (100)	4.55 (116)	5.63 (143)	5.09 (129)	6.88 (175)	5.99 (152)	5.20 (132)	4.54 (115)	6.84 (174)	5.52 (140)	5.09 (129)	63.68 (1,617)
Source: PRISM Climate Group

== See also ==
- List of mountains of Maine
