= Newry, Maine =

Town in Maine, United States

- Town
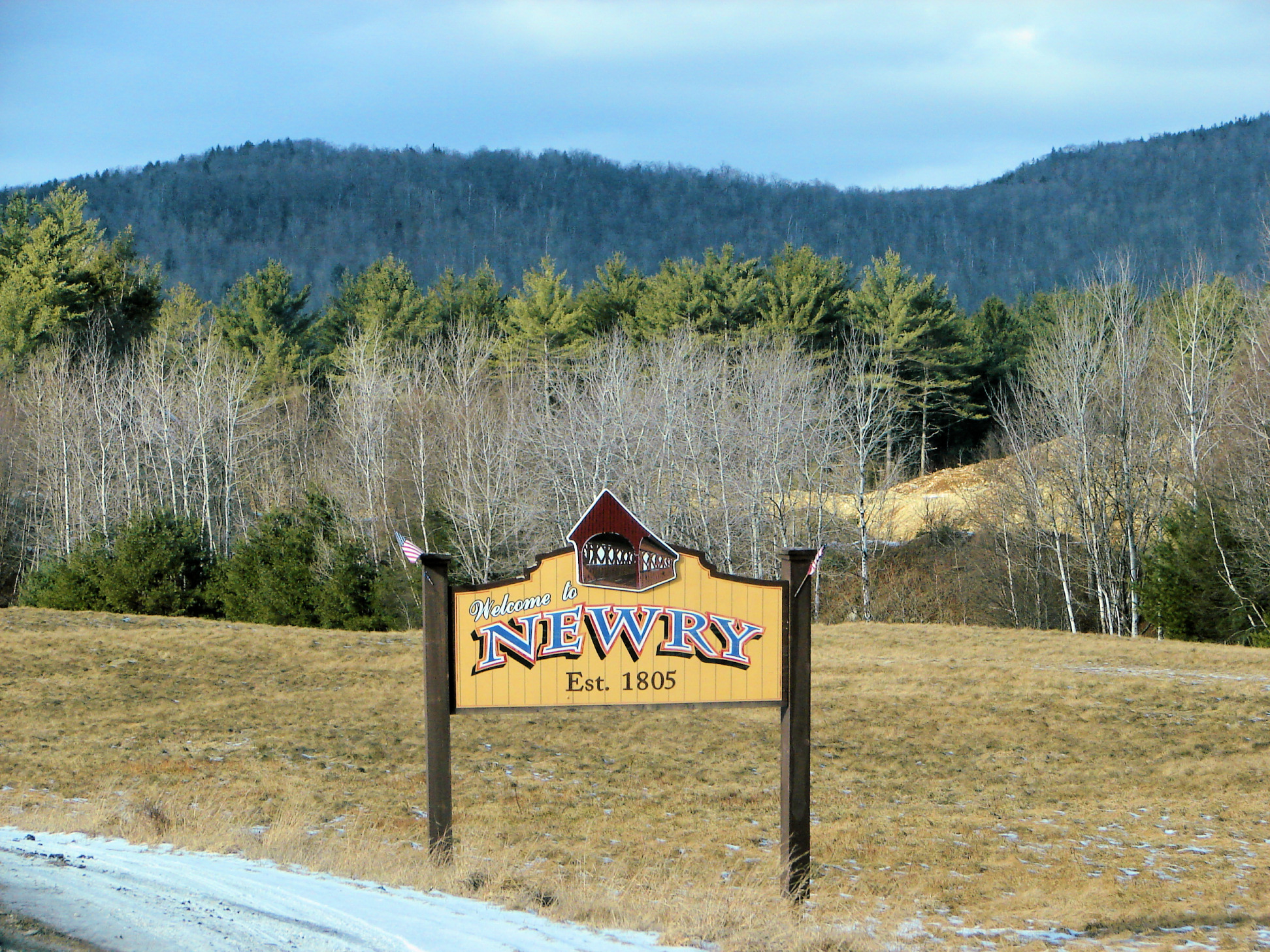
- Newry welcome sign

- Location within Maine Location within the United States
- Coordinates: 44°30′11″N 70°50′17″W
- Country: United States
- State: Maine
- County: Oxford
- Incorporated: 1805

Area
  - Total: 61.55 sq mi (159.41 km^{2})
  - Land: 61.52 sq mi (159.34 km^{2})
  - Water: 0.031 sq mi (0.08 km^{2})
- Elevation: 725 ft (221 m)

Population (2020)
  - Total: 411
  - Density: 6.7/sq mi (2.6/km^{2})
- Time zone: UTC−5 (Eastern (EST))
  - Summer (DST): UTC−4 (EDT)
- ZIP Code: 04261
- Area code: 207
- FIPS code: 23-49275
- GNIS feature ID: 582623
- Website: newrymaine.org

Newry (/ˈnjʊəri/; from Irish An Iúraigh) is a resort town in Oxford County, Maine, United States. The town’s year-round population was 411 at the 2020 census. The town is best known as the home of Sunday River Ski Resort and has a proportionately large seasonal (winter) population. Newry was also the site of one of Maine's worst Cold War aircraft crashes.

== History ==
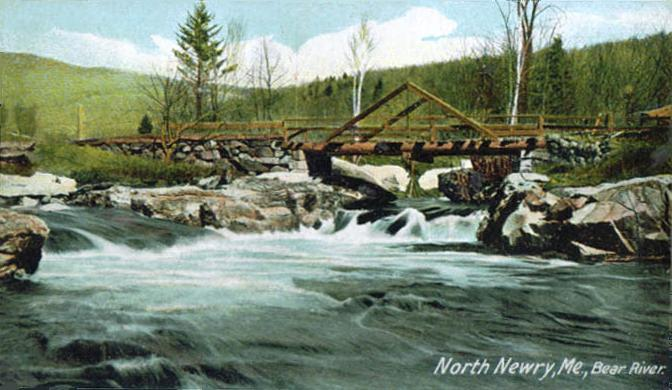
Bear River in 1905

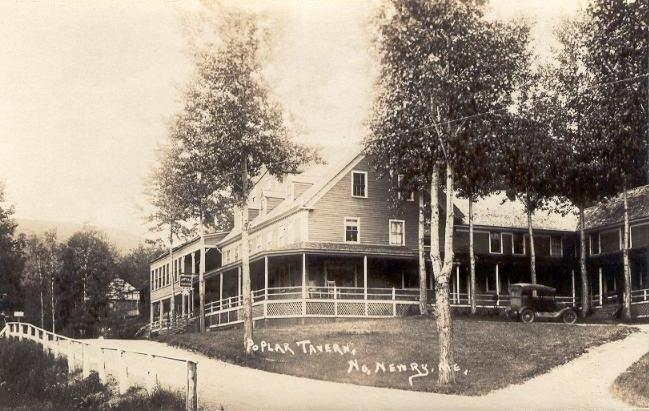
Poplar Tavern c. 1918

First called Sunday River Plantation, it was settled in 1781 by Benjamin Barker and his two brothers from Methuen, Massachusetts, together with Ithiel Smith of Cape Elizabeth. But the settlement was plundered in 1782 by Indians and abandoned. Then John J. Holmes of New Jersey purchased the land in 1794 with his sister's surname on the deed: Bostwick. On June 15, 1805, Bostwick Plantation was renamed by settlers that had come from Newry in what is now Northern Ireland. The name Newry is an anglicization of An Iúraigh, an oblique form of An Iúrach, which means "the grove of yew trees".

The trade route (now Route 26) from Portland to Errol, New Hampshire, completed in 1802, passed through Newry. Farms were established on the intervales, which had excellent soil. Hay was the principal crop. Slopes of the mountains provided pasturage for grazing animals. A sawmill and gristmill were built on the Bear River, and by 1870 the population was 416. Today, Newry is noted as the home of Sunday River Ski Resort.

=== 1960 KC-97 tanker crash ===
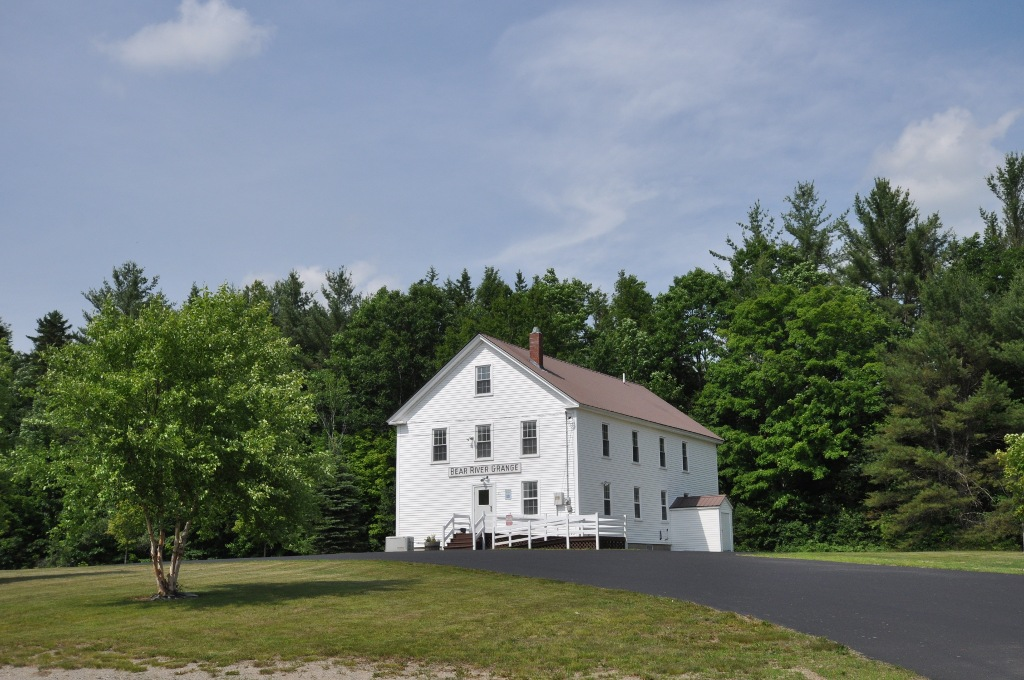
Bear River Grange

At 20:15 on June 27, 1960, a United States Air Force tanker of the 380th Air Refueling Squadron departed Plattsburgh AFB to refuel a Strategic Air Command bomber. The Boeing KC-97 Stratofreighter rendezvoused with the B-47 Stratojet bomber at an altitude of 15,500 feet in the Fighting Fox aerial refueling area over Newry. As the bomber maneuvered into refueling position, a lubrication failure caused the tanker's outboard port engine supercharger impeller to disintegrate. Impeller fragments leaving the engine nacelle caused fuel leakage. The bomber observed ignition of the leaking fuel and broke away from formation. The tanker entered a gradual left turn, which became a spiraling spin as the fire rapidly caused structural damage to the port wing. Seven miles away, three hundred people at a Rumford Point drive-in theater observed the tanker spin down, with burning pieces flying off. The fuselage impacted a forested slope of granite boulders and caused a fireball seen fifty miles away in Lewiston. The port wing tip was found in Howard Pond, three miles from the crash site. There were no survivors from the tanker's five-man crew. Wet vegetation limited spread of the fire, but fuel-covered trees were completely consumed and the five-acre hillside wreckage field was discernible for years amid the surrounding forest.

=== Newry murders ===
The February 23, 2012, episode of Sins and Secrets (season 2, episode 7, "Newry") told the story of a series of murders that happened at a local B&B in 2006. The convicted killer, charged in 2006 and now serving four consecutive life sentences, was a citizen of Newry.

=== Lithium deposits ===
Substantial lithium deposits were discovered in 2018 on the north side of Plumbago Mountain, which straddles Newry and Andover, Maine. Based on analyses of this deposit, U.S. Geological Survey estimates that 900 thousand metric tons of lithium are concentrated in Maine and New Hampshire in the Northern Appalachians, enough lithium to supply the batters in 130 million electric vehicles.

After debate in the legislature, state regulators unanimously approved a change to Maine's mining laws designed to exempt extraction of metallic minerals such as spodumene (which contains lithium) from mining regulations so long as they can prove that nearby land or water won't be polluted. As of 2025, no application has been filed, with landowners claiming that uncertainty in the regulatory process made the process difficult to navigate.

== Geography ==
According to the United States Census Bureau, the town has a total area of 61.55 square miles (159.41 km^{2}), of which 61.52 square miles (159.34 km^{2}) is land and 0.03 square miles (0.08 km^{2}) is water. Newry is drained by the Bear River and Sunday River, which both flow into the Androscoggin River.

== Demographics ==
Historical population
Census	Pop.	Note	%±
1810	202		—
1820	304		50.5%
1830	345		13.5%
1840	463		34.2%
1850	459		−0.9%
1860	474		3.3%
1870	416		−12.2%
1880	337		−19.0%
1890	343		1.8%
1900	286		−16.6%
1910	271		−5.2%
1920	254		−6.3%
1930	188		−26.0%
1940	167		−11.2%
1950	188		12.6%
1960	260		38.3%
1970	208		−20.0%
1980	235		13.0%
1990	316		34.5%
2000	344		8.9%
2010	329		−4.4%
2020	411		24.9%
U.S. Decennial Census

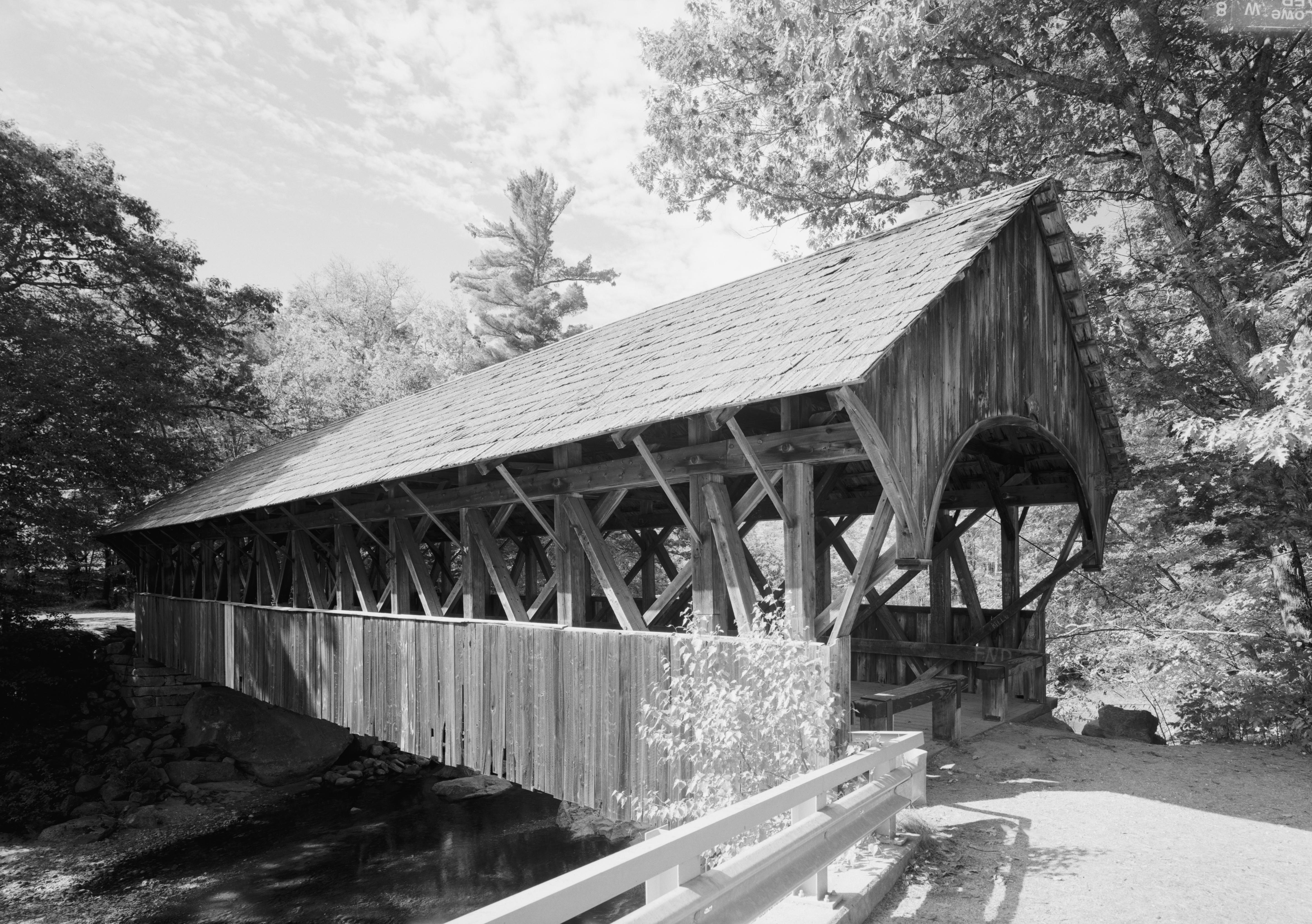
Artists' Covered Bridge (built in 1872)

=== 2010 census ===
As of the census of 2010, there were 329 people, 157 households, and 93 families living in the town. The population density was 5.3 inhabitants per square mile (2.0/km^{2}). There were 1,334 housing units at an average density of 21.7 per square mile (8.4/km^{2}). The racial makeup of the town was 97.3% White, 1.2% Native American, and 1.5% from two or more races. Hispanic or Latino of any race were 0.9% of the population.

There were 157 households, of which 17.8% had children under the age of 18 living with them, 52.9% were married couples living together, 3.8% had a female householder with no husband present, 2.5% had a male householder with no wife present, and 40.8% were non-families. Of all households 30.6% were made up of individuals, and 8.9% had someone living alone who was 65 years of age or older. The average household size was 2.10 and the average family size was 2.62.

The median age in the town was 49.9 years. 14.6% of residents were under the age of 18; 6.6% were between the ages of 18 and 24; 20.1% were from 25 to 44; 41.3% were from 45 to 64; and 17.3% were 65 years of age or older. The gender makeup of the town was 53.2% male and 46.8% female.

=== 2000 census ===
As of the census of 2000, there were 344 people, 142 households, and 90 families living in the town. The population density was 5.6 people per square mile (2.2/km^{2}). There were 1,075 housing units at an average density of 17.5 per square mile (6.8/km^{2}). The racial makeup of the town was 98.26% White, 0.87% Native American, 0.29% Asian, and 0.58% from two or more races.

There were 142 households, out of which 30.3% had children under the age of 18 living with them, 50.0% were married couples living together, 5.6% had a female householder with no husband present, and 36.6% were non-families. Of all households 23.9% were made up of individuals, and 4.9% had someone living alone who was 65 years of age or older. The average household size was 2.42 and the average family size was 2.96.

In the town, the population was spread out, with 25.0% under the age of 18, 7.8% from 18 to 24, 25.9% from 25 to 44, 30.5% from 45 to 64, and 10.8% who were 65 years of age or older. The median age was 41 years. For every 100 females, there were 108.5 males. For every 100 females age 18 and over, there were 111.5 males.

The median income for a household in the town was $42,321, and the median income for a family was $51,250. Males had a median income of $37,500 versus $19,625 for females. The per capita income for the town was $21,982. About 3.8% of families and 5.0% of the population were below the poverty line, including 2.2% of those under age 18 and 12.5% of those age 65 or over.

== Sites of interest ==
- Sunday River Ski Resort
- Grafton Notch State Park, just north of town
