= Success Pond =

Body of water in New Hampshire, United States

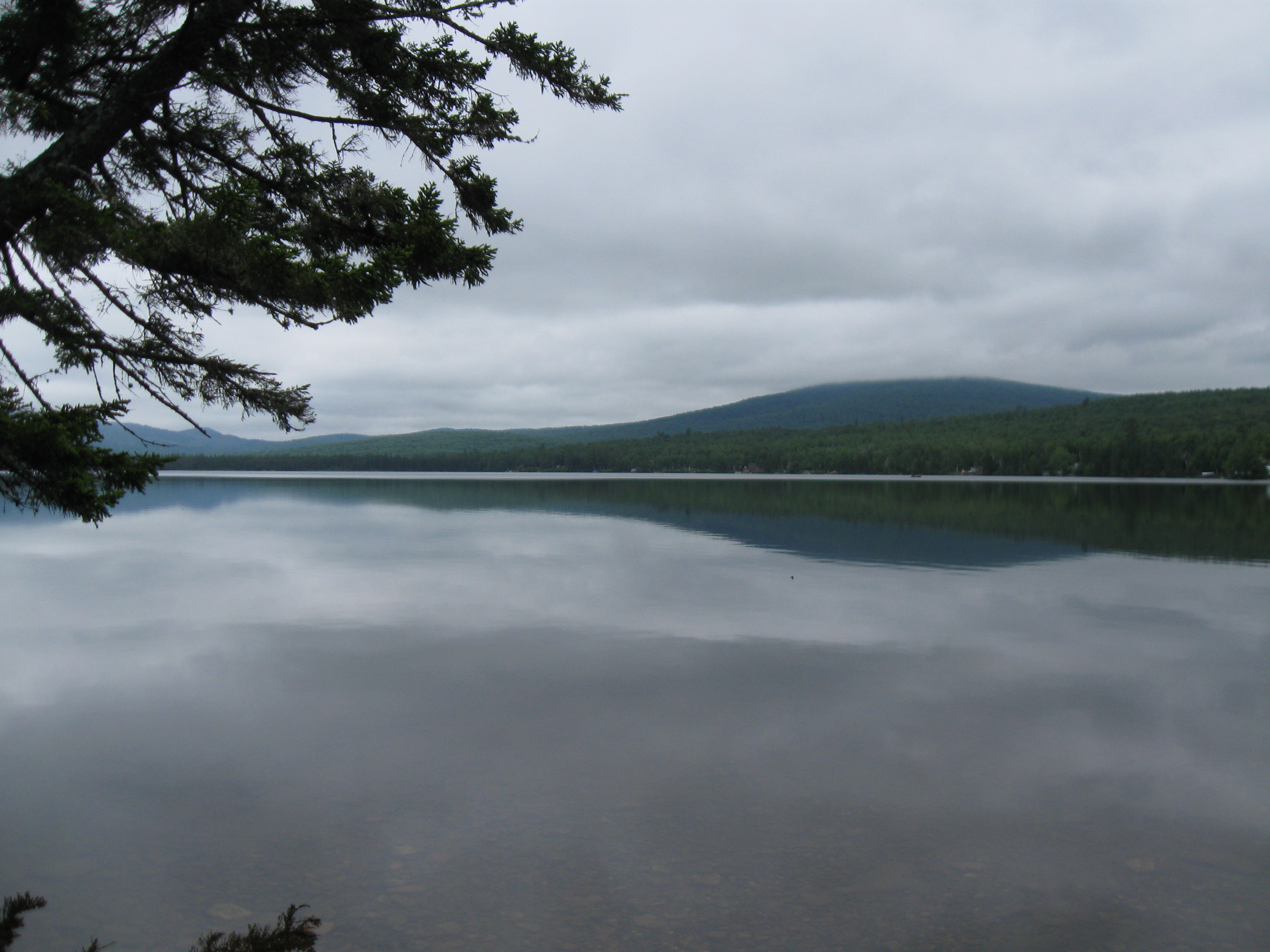

- Location within New Hampshire Location within the United States
- Location: Coos County, New Hampshire
- Coordinates: 44°34′13″N 71°2′29″W
- Primary inflows: Sucker Brook
- Primary outflows: Chickwolnepy Stream
- Basin countries: United States
- Max. length: 1.2 mi (1.9 km)
- Max. width: 0.5 mi (0.80 km)
- Surface area: 282 acres (1.14 km^{2})
- Average depth: 16 ft (4.9 m)
- Max. depth: 25 ft (7.6 m)
- Surface elevation: 1,601 ft (488 m)
- Islands: 1
- Settlements: Success Township

Success Pond is a 282-acre (1.14 km^{2}) water body located in Coos County in northern New Hampshire, United States, in the township of Success. Water from the pond flows west via Chickwolnepy Stream to the Androscoggin River.

There are a number of summer houses, cottages, and cabins located on the pond. Recreational uses include swimming, boating, and fishing.

The lake is classified as a coldwater fishery, with observed species including brook trout, rainbow trout, brown trout, smallmouth bass, and largemouth bass.

== See also ==
- List of lakes in New Hampshire
