= Stephen Philbrick =

Stephen Philbrick is an American author, poet, and licensed United Church of Christ minister.

== Biography ==
Philbrick is the son of poet Charles Horace Philbrick, the father of author Frank Philbrick, the brother of master furniture maker Timothy Philbrick, the cousin of author Nathaniel Philbrick, and the uncle of artist Clancy Philbrick. He is a linchpin of the Philbrick literary family.

Philbrick graduated from Brown University in 1971, and now lives in Windsor, Massachusetts.

Philbrick is the minister of the West Cummington Congregational Church, which burned to the ground in 2010. The church was rebuilt in the following two years and reopened on November 4, 2012. The occasion of the reopening was marked by a celebration of the congregation and a service by Philbrick.

== Books ==
- The Backyard Lumberjack: The Ultimate Guide to Felling, Bucking, Splitting & Stacking. Frank Philbrick and Stephen Philbrick. North Adams, MA: Storey Publishing, LLC, 2006. ISBN 1-58017-651-8
- Three. Stephen Philbrick. Adastra Press, 2003. ISBN 0-938566-92-X
- No Goodbye. Stephen Philbrick. Smith, 1982. ISBN 0-912292-68-7
- Up to the Elbow. Stephen Philbrick. Adastra Press, 1997. ISBN 0-938566-76-8
