= Swift Cambridge River =

River in Maine, United States

Coordinates: 44.71894°N 70.98841°W

Location
- Country: United States

Physical characteristics
- Source
  - location: Maine

The Swift Cambridge River is a 15.3-mile-long (24.6 km) river in northwestern Maine. It rises near the New Hampshire border, north of Grafton Notch, and flows north through the Grafton Forest Wilderness Preserve to the Dead Cambridge River, a tributary of Umbagog Lake. The Androscoggin River flows from Umbagog to the tidal Kennebec River in Maine.

== See also ==
- List of rivers of Maine
