= Grafton Notch State Park =

State park in Oxford County, Maine

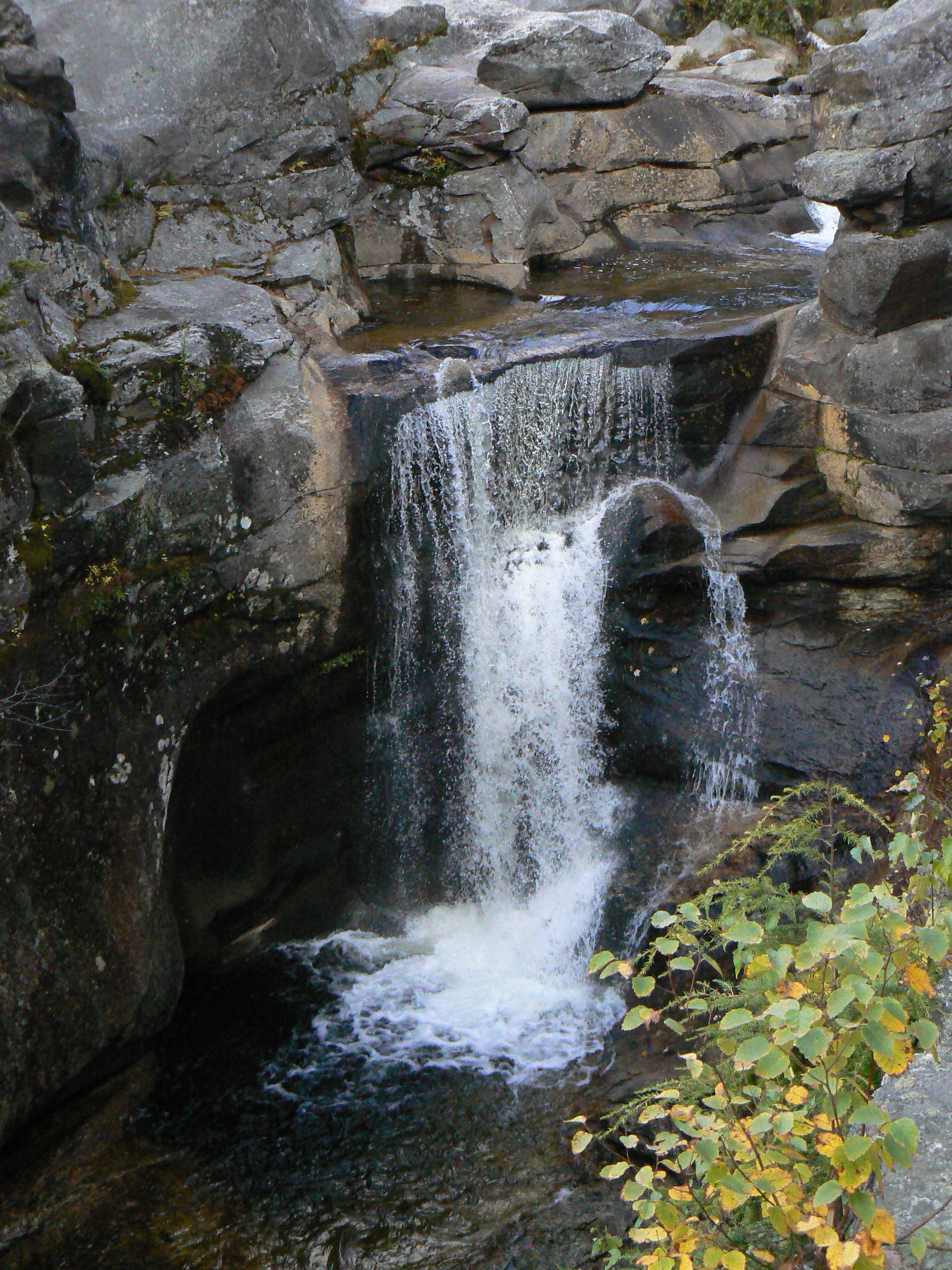
- Screw Auger Falls

- Location within Maine
- Interactive map of Grafton Notch State Park
- Location: Grafton Township, Oxford County, Maine, United States
- Coordinates: 44°35′36″N 70°56′52″W
- Area: 3,129 acres (12.66 km^{2})
- Elevation: 1,601 ft (488 m)
- Established: 1963
- Administrator: Maine Department of Agriculture, Conservation and Forestry
- Website: Official website
- Maine State Parks

Grafton Notch State Park is a public recreation area in Grafton Township, Oxford County, Maine. The state park occupies 3,129 acres (1,266 ha) surrounding Grafton Notch, the mountain pass between Old Speck Mountain and Baldpate Mountain, mountains in the Mahoosuc Range. The park is abutted by the eastern and western sections of the Mahoosuc Public Reserved Land, which total 31,807 acres (12,872 ha). The park is managed by the Department of Agriculture, Conservation and Forestry.

== History ==
In 1963, the state made its first acquisitions of the land for the park with the purchase of 2,875 acres (1,163 ha) from Brown Company. The addition of 18 more parcels, many less than 5 acres, took place in the 1960s, mostly in 1964. The park boundaries were fixed with the addition of two one-acre parcels in 1977.

== Wildlife ==
Songbirds, migratory birds and occasionally raptors (specifically eagles, falcons, and hawks) are spotted in this park by birdwatchers. Mammalian species such as black bear, moose, fox, bobcat, coyote, fisher, and white-tailed deer roam on the hiking trails.

== Geology ==
Grafton Notch reflects the glaciation processes carved by the Laurentide Ice sheet during the Wisconsin Glaciation episode. Notable geomorphology of the park includes U-shaped valleys, gorges, and esker. Erosional processes expose the unique bedrock composed of Devonian granite with pegmatite intrusions. Poorly sorted diamicton and stratified gravel pits indicate glacial and glacio-fluvial depositional processes at work. Additionally, these processes scattered erratics over the u-shaped valley floor.

Noteworthy gorges in Grafton Notch include Screw Auger Falls, Mother Walker Falls and Moose Cave. Screw Auger Falls is located within a steep gorge along the Bear River; when water levels are low enough, erratics are visible in the stream. Steep cliff faces and flat valley floor seen from Mother Walker Falls are characteristic of glacial erosion. However, responsibility for gorge formation is debated; "they may have formed while the ice sheet retreated north of the region and contributed a large quantity of meltwater, or more likely, they formed while the ice sheet covered the area and the subglacial water was under very high pressure". Whether a particular landform was created by local glacier or continental ice sheet is also still debated. Many pegmatite vein intrusions are visible around the water-eroded bedrock of the gorges.

== Activities and amenities ==
The park's mountain scenery includes the Screw Auger and Mother Walker waterfalls and Moose Cave. Recreational opportunities include fishing, hunting, and picnicking. Hiking trails include a rugged 12-mile (19 km) stretch of the Appalachian Trail. The ice climbing in the area is extensive and offers a variety of climbing for the beginner as well as the advanced.
