= Samuel D. Philbrook House =

Historic house in Maine, United States

- U.S. National Register of Historic Places
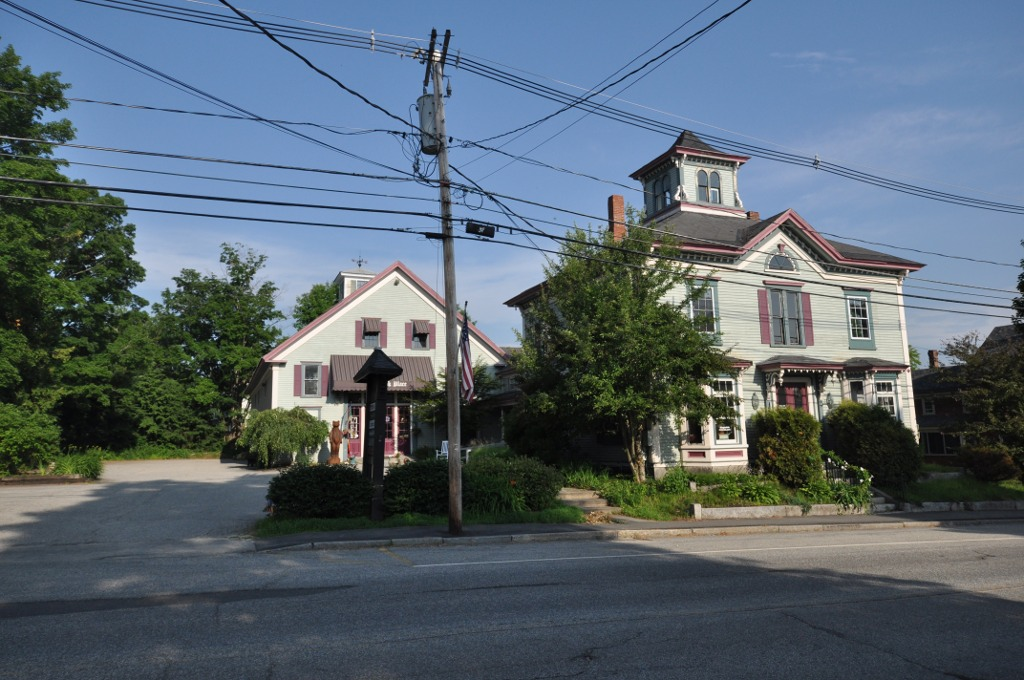

- Location within Maine Location within the United States
- Location: 162 Main St., Bethel, Maine
- Coordinates: 44°24′35″N 70°47′21″W
- Area: less than one acre
- Built: 1878
- Architect: Merrill, Edmund, Jr.
- Architectural style: Italianate
- NRHP reference No.: 95000216
- Added to NRHP: March 10, 1995

The Samuel D. Philbrook House is a historic house at 162 Main Street in Bethel, Maine. Built in 1878-79 by a local businessman, it is probably the most elaborate Italianate residence in the community, and one of the finest of the type in Oxford County. It now houses a retail space in the first floor and attached barn, with living space above. It was listed on the National Register of Historic Places in 1995.

== Description and history ==
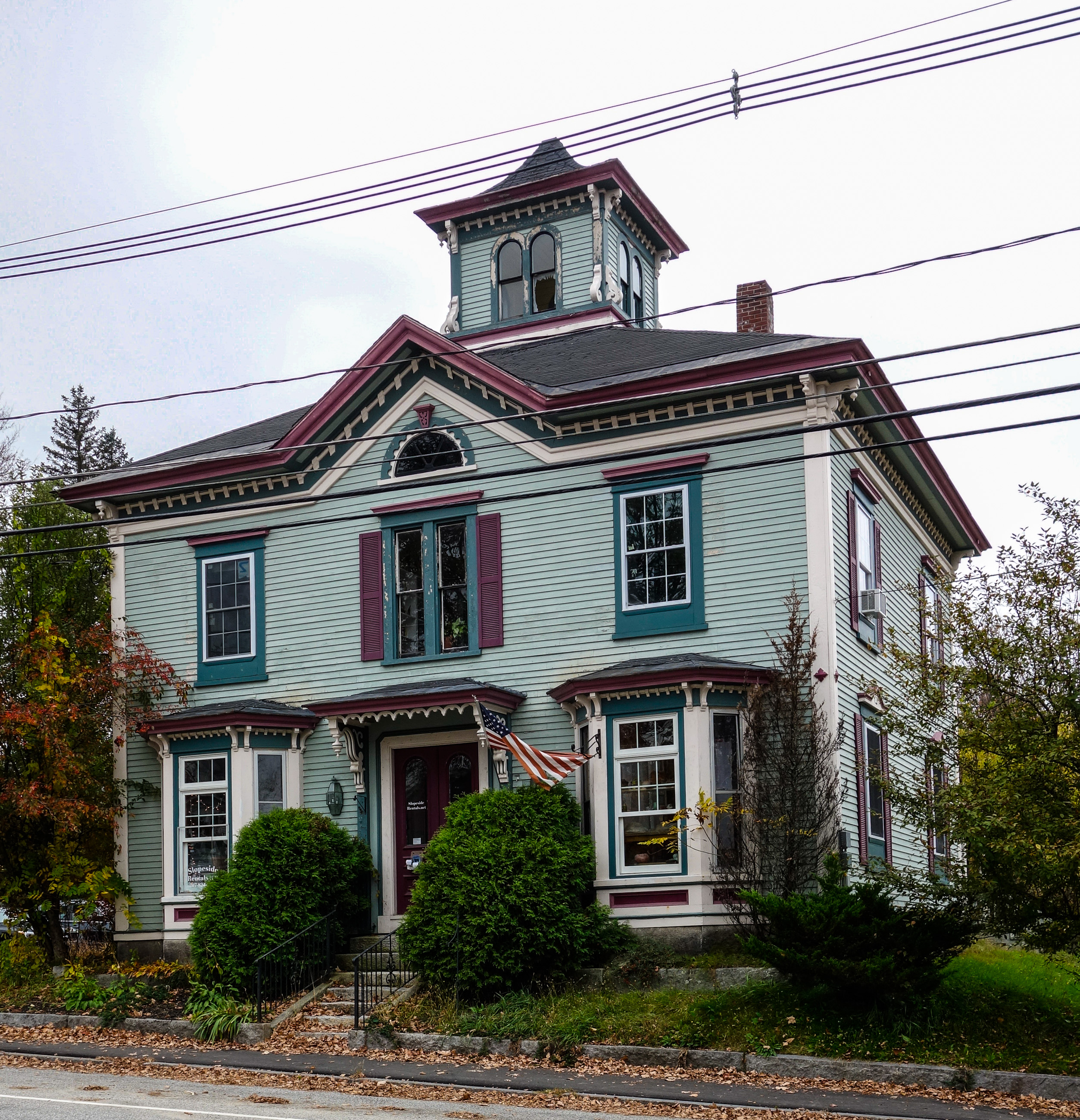
Samuel D. Philbrook House in 2013

The Philbrook House is a two-story wood-frame structure, three bays wide, with a hip roof and a granite foundation. The roughly square main block has a 1 1/2-story ell extending from its rear, joining it to a large barn/carriage house, all of which are of similar vintage construction. The house is proportioned in typical Italianate fashion, with its somewhat block shape elaborated with significant decorative woodwork. The main (east-facing) facade has a center entry sheltered by an elaborate hood, and is flanked by projecting polygonal bays with wood panel sections below the windows, and a bracketed cornice above. The main roof line is modillioned, and there is a gable centered above the entrance, in which there is a half-round window with keystone. The roof is topped by a square cupola with paired round-arch windows on each side, and a bracketed cornice below a flared pyramidal roof.

The property on which the house stands was purchased in 1858 by Samuel Delano Philbrook, a native of Gilead who was a successful cattle dealer and later president of a local bank. The existing structures on the property burned in 1878, and he apparently rebuilt immediately thereafter, constructing this house and barn. The Philbrooks lived here until their deaths. In the 20th century the property served as a time as an inn and as a health center, and now houses a retail establishment, with a living space above.

== See also ==
- John M. Philbrook House
- National Register of Historic Places listings in Oxford County, Maine
