= Cambridge, New Hampshire =

Township in Coos County, New Hampshire, United States

- Township
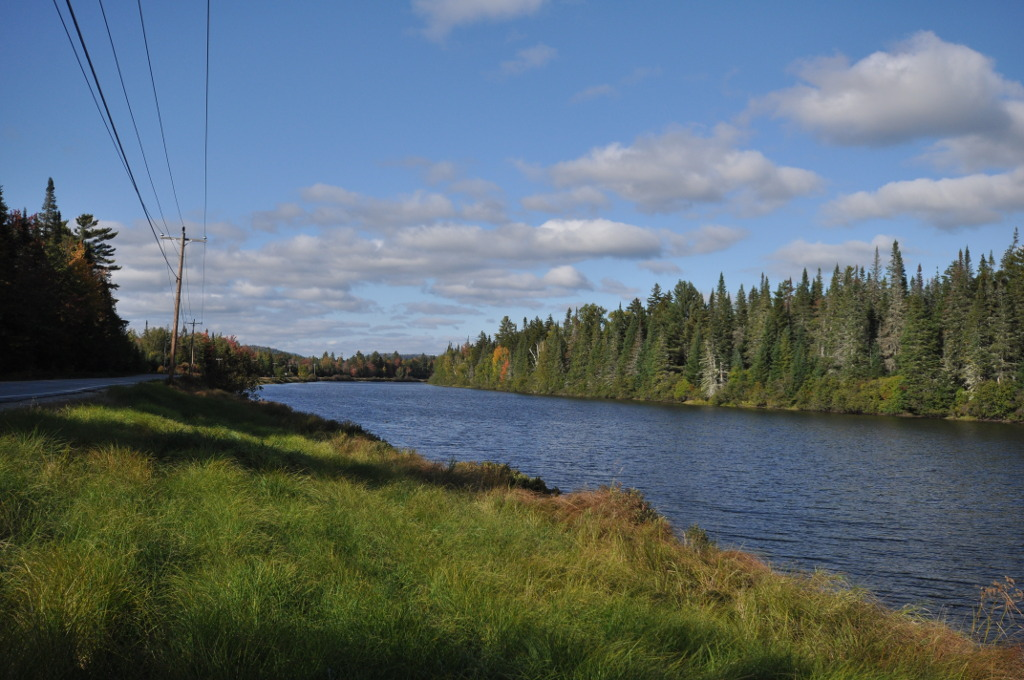
- The Androscoggin River along New Hampshire Route 16 in Cambridge

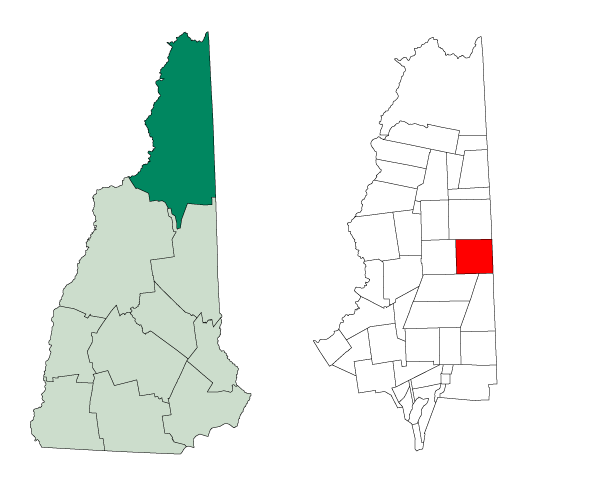
- Location in Coös County, New Hampshire
- Coordinates: 44°39′35″N 71°06′31″W
- Country: United States
- State: New Hampshire
- County: Coös

Area
  - Total: 51.72 sq mi (133.95 km^{2})
  - Land: 50.99 sq mi (132.06 km^{2})
  - Water: 0.73 sq mi (1.89 km^{2}) 1.41%
- Elevation: 1,525 ft (465 m)

Population (2020)
  - Total: 16
  - Density: 0.31/sq mi (0.12/km^{2})
- Time zone: UTC-5 (Eastern)
  - Summer (DST): UTC-4 (Eastern)
- Area code: 603
- FIPS code: 33-007-08420

Cambridge is a township in Coös County in the state of New Hampshire. The population was 16 at the 2020 census, up from 8 at the 2010 census, and was estimated to be 11 in 2025.

In New Hampshire, locations, grants, townships (which are different from towns), and purchases are unincorporated portions of a county which are not part of any town and have limited self-government (if any, as many are uninhabited). Cambridge is part of the Berlin, NH-VT Micropolitan Statistical Area.

== History ==
It was granted in 1793 to Nathaniel Rogers and others and contained about 23,160 acres (9,370 ha).

== Geography ==
Most of the township is forested wilderness, but it contains the southernmost edge of Umbagog Lake, accessed via New Hampshire Route 26 from Errol or from Upton, Maine. The lake's outlet, 6 miles (10 km) to the north in Errol, is the source of the Androscoggin River, which flows southward through the northwestern part of Cambridge. A portion of the 13-Mile Woods Scenic Area follows the Androscoggin through the township, as does New Hampshire Route 16, which leads north to Errol and south to Berlin.

According to the United States Census Bureau, the township has a total area of 51.7 square miles (133.9 km^{2}), of which 51.0 square miles (132.1 km^{2}) are land and 0.73 square miles (1.9 km^{2}), or 1.41%, are water. The entire township is part of the Androscoggin River watershed, with its three main tributaries in the township being, from north to south, Mollidgewock Brook, Bog Brook, and Chickwolnepy Stream (along with its own tributary, Blackstrap Brook). The highest point in the township is the summit of Cambridge Black Mountain, at 2,780 feet (850 m) above sea level. The township is bordered to the east by Oxford County, Maine.

=== Adjacent municipalities ===
- Errol (north)
- Upton, Maine (east)
- North Oxford, Maine (east)
- Success (southeast)
- Milan (south)
- Dummer (west)

== Demographics ==
Historical population
Census	Pop.	Note	%±
1840	5		—
1850	33		560.0%
1860	49		48.5%
1870	28		−42.9%
1880	36		28.6%
1890	31		−13.9%
1900	17		−45.2%
1910	5		−70.6%
1920	1		−80.0%
1930	1		0.0%
1940	0		−100.0%
1950	8		—
1960	0		−100.0%
1970	4		—
1980	5		25.0%
1990	0		−100.0%
2000	10		—
2010	8		−20.0%
2020	16		100.0%
U.S. Decennial Census

As of the 2000 census, there were 10 people, 5 households, and 3 families living in the township. The population density was 0.2 inhabitants per square mile (0.077/km^{2}). There were 39 housing units at an average density of 0.8 per square mile (0.31/km^{2}). The racial makeup of the township was 100.00% White.

There were 5 households, out of which 40.0% had children under the age of 18 living with them, 60.0% were married couples living together, and 40.0% were non-families. 40.0% of all households were made up of individuals, and 20.0% had someone living alone who was 65 years of age or older. The average household size was 2.00 and the average family size was 2.67.

In the township, the population was spread out, with 20.0% under the age of 18, 30.0% from 25 to 44, 40.0% from 45 to 64, and 10.0% who were 65 years of age or older. The median age was 44 years. For every female of any age, there was one male.
