= John M. Philbrook House =

Historic house in Maine, United States

- U.S. National Register of Historic Places
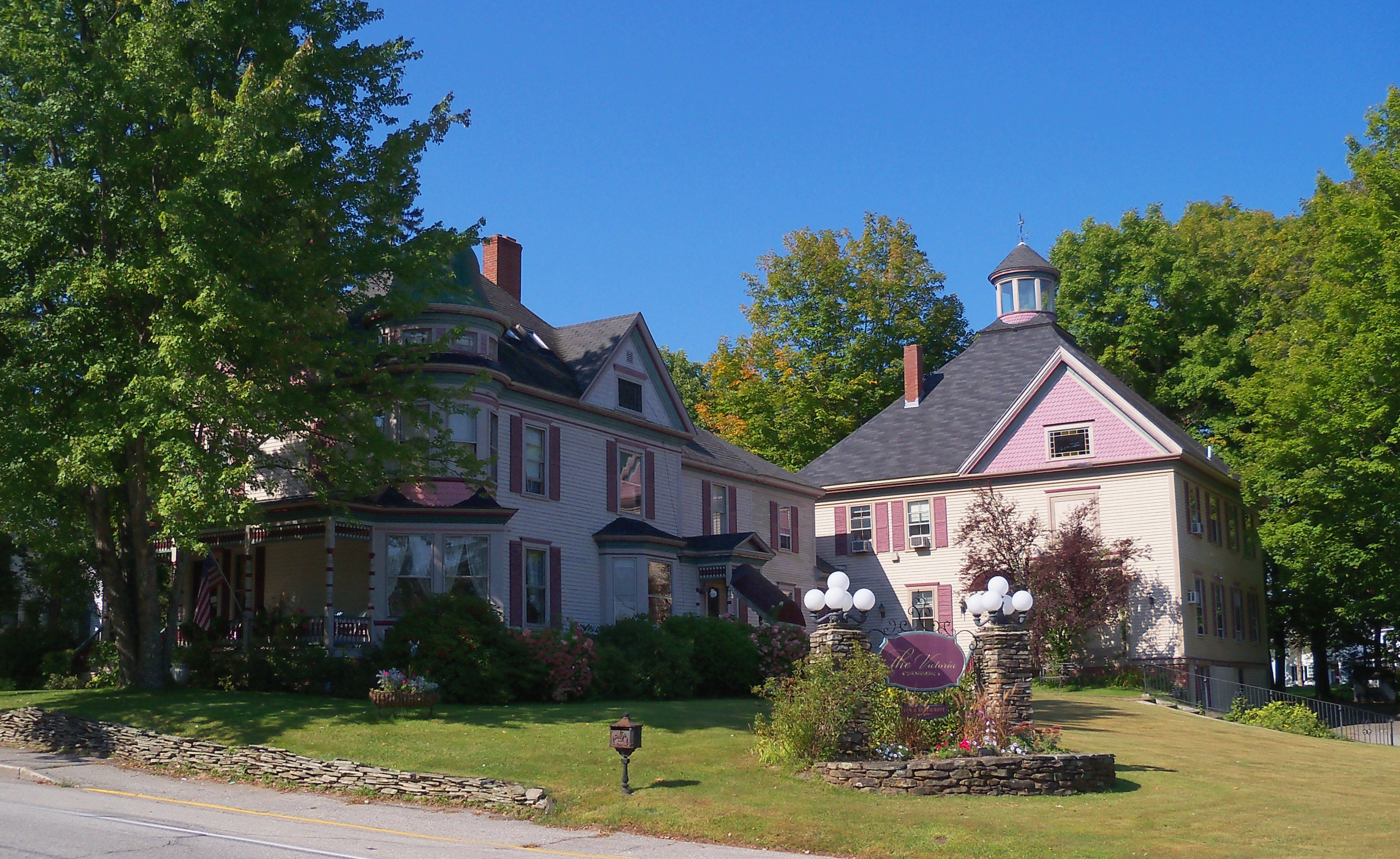

- Location within Maine Location within the United States
- Location: 32 Main St., Bethel, Maine
- Coordinates: 44°24′20″N 70°47′27″W
- Area: less than one acre
- Built: 1895
- Built by: Gilbert Tuell
- Architectural style: Queen Anne
- NRHP reference No.: 95001465
- Added to NRHP: December 14, 1995

The John M. Philbrook House, now the Grand Victorian Inn, is a historic house at 32 Main Street in Bethel, Maine. Built in 1895, it is the town's most sophisticated example of Queen Anne architecture. John Philbrook, for whom it was built, was a lumber and cattle merchant. The house was used in the 1970s as faculty housing for nearby Gould Academy, and is now an inn. It was listed on the National Register of Historic Places in 1995.

== Description and history ==
The Philbrook House is a 2 1/2-story wood-frame structure, resting on a granite foundation and finished in weatherboards. It has asymmetrical and irregular massing typical of the Queen Anne period, with a tower at the northeast corner topped by a bell-shaped roof. A porch extends across most of the front (eastern) facade, with a shed roof, gable above the stairs, and turned posts connected by a balustrade and a delicate wooden screen at the top. The roof is basically hipped, although there are cross gables, and a large front gable which includes a small semicircular roof projection at its peak. The interior of the house features elegant woodwork in the fireplace mantels, and a plaster medallion in one of the parlors. A more utilitarian ell extends to the rear of the house; it was a later addition that was damaged by fire and has been rehabilitated. The ell joins the main house to a large carriage house which also features Queen Anne elements, including a small octagonal cupola. Its interior has been converted to residential space.

The house was built in 1895 by Gilbert Tuell, a local contractor, for about $8,000. John Philbrook, the buyer, was a native of Shelburne, New Hampshire who attended Bethel's Gould Academy. He began his career in farming and lumber, and eventually became a merchant, and served several terms in the Maine State Senate and as a county commissioner. Left vacant for a number of years following Philbrook's death, the home was purchased by a local car dealer in 1938. It was later used as faculty housing by the academy in the 1970, and is now the location of the Grand Victorian Inn, a bed and breakfast.

== See also ==
- National Register of Historic Places listings in Oxford County, Maine
