= Mahoosuc Notch =

- Interactive map of Mahoosuc Notch
- Elevation: 750 m (2,460 ft)
- Traversed by: Appalachian Trail

Location
- Location: North Oxford, Oxford County, Maine, U.S.
- Range: Mahoosuc Range
- Coordinates: 44°32.29′N 70°59.36′W
- Topo map: USGS "Old Speck Mountain"

Mahoosuc Notch is a deep gap in the Mahoosuc Range of western Maine in the United States. It is traversed by the Appalachian Trail and is notable for being a particularly difficult section for thru-hikers.

== Description ==
The boulders on this mile-long section of trail present obstacles that must be climbed over and sometimes under, creating a unique hiking experience. There are occasional 10-foot (3.0 m) drops, and places where packs must be removed to squeeze beneath a boulder.

Many hikers call this stretch one of the slowest on the approximately 2,200-mile (3,500 km) Appalachian Trail. This so-called "killer mile" or the "toughest mile" is a section that can cause hikers to slow down.

== Image gallery ==
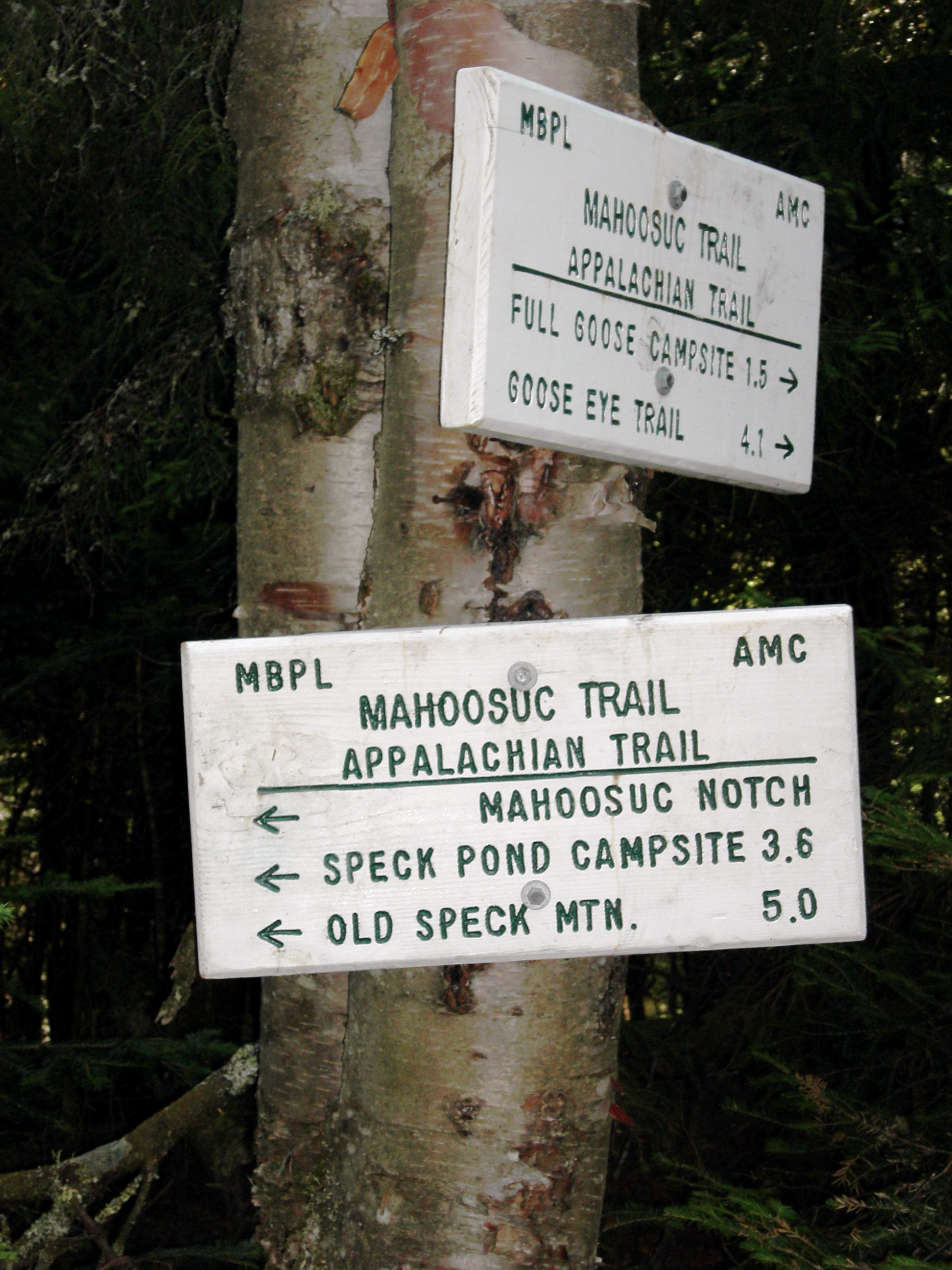
The beginning of the "killer mile" from the south

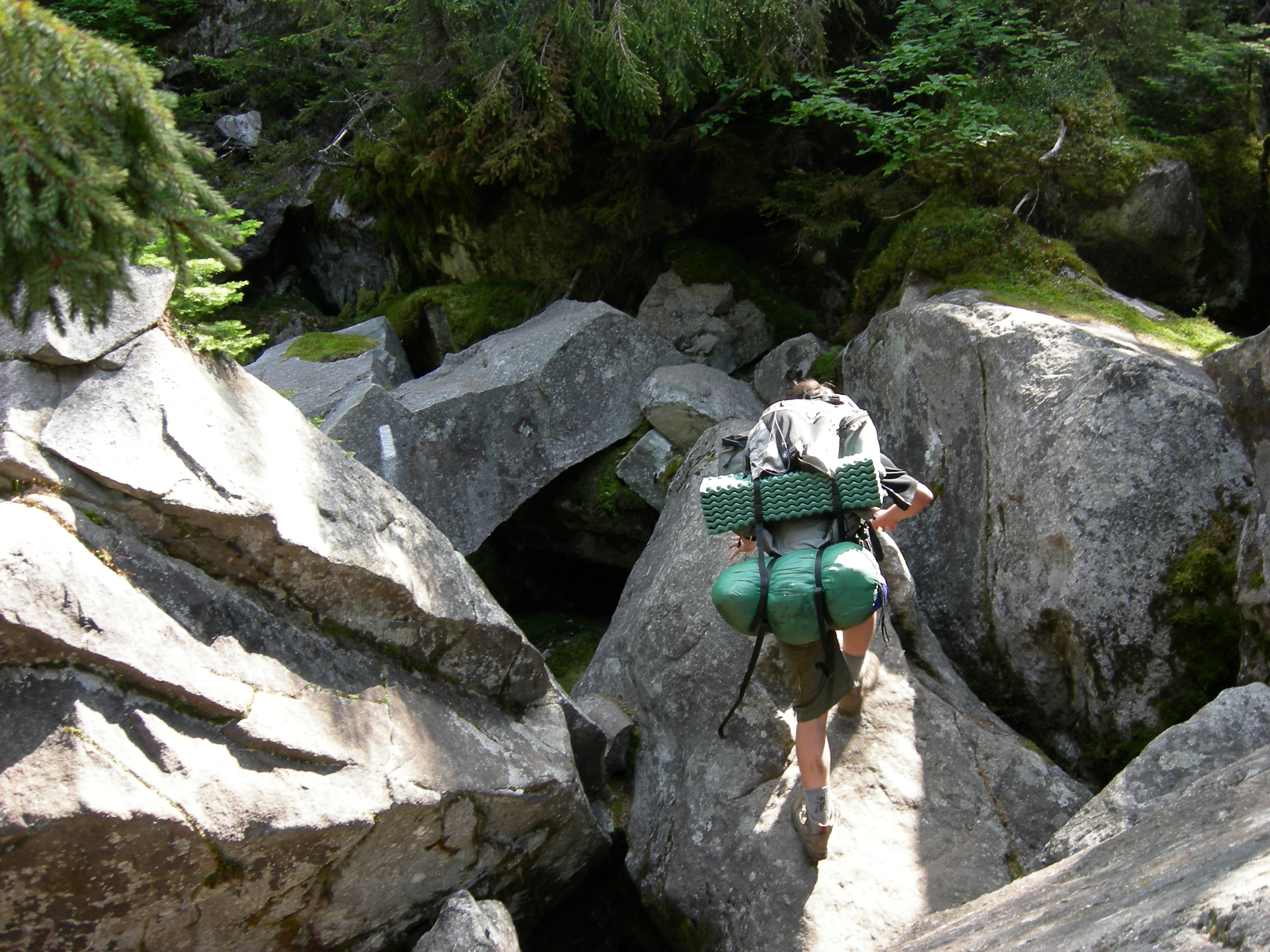
Rugged terrain of the trail

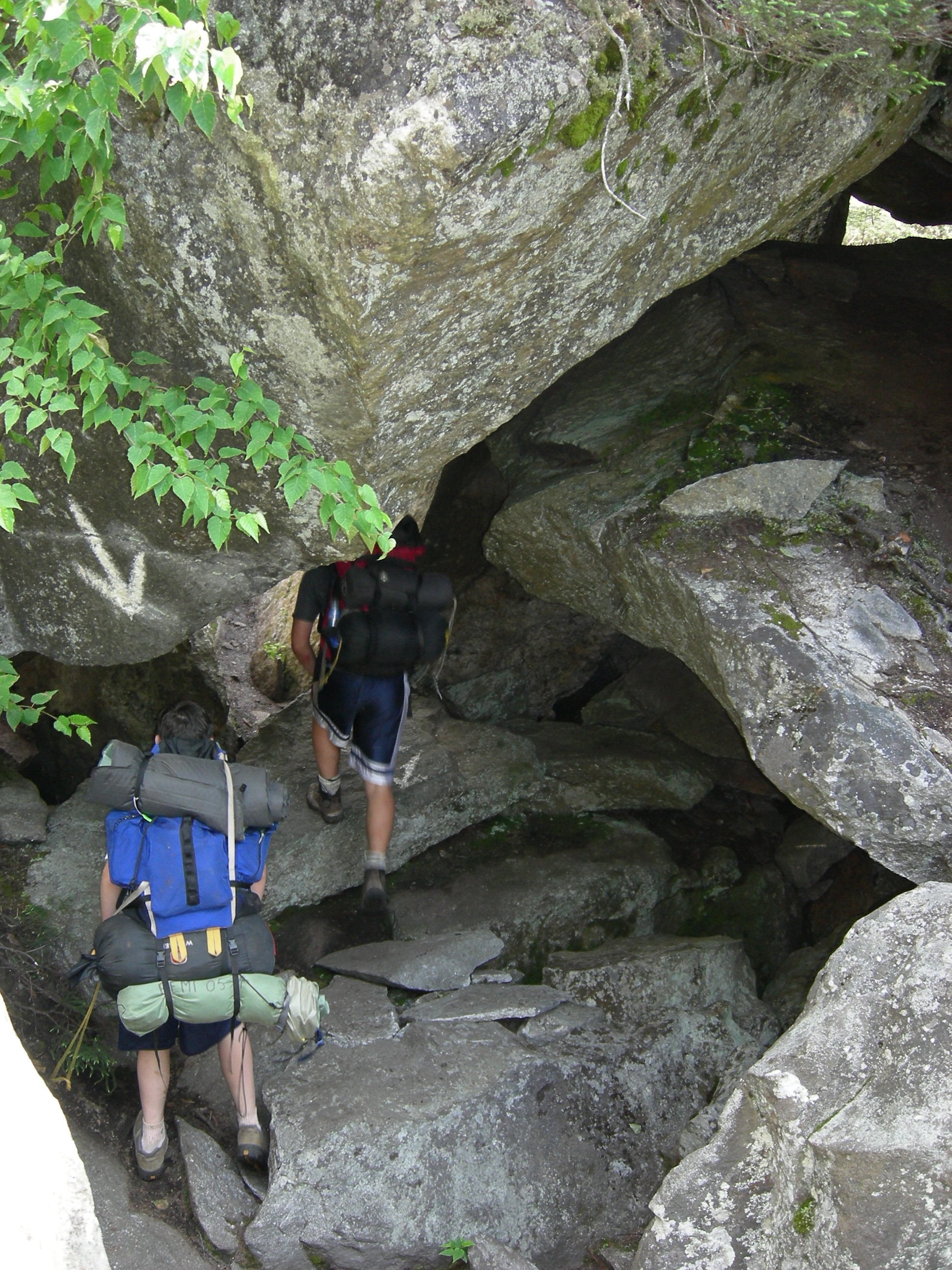
Some of the boulders that hikers must pass under

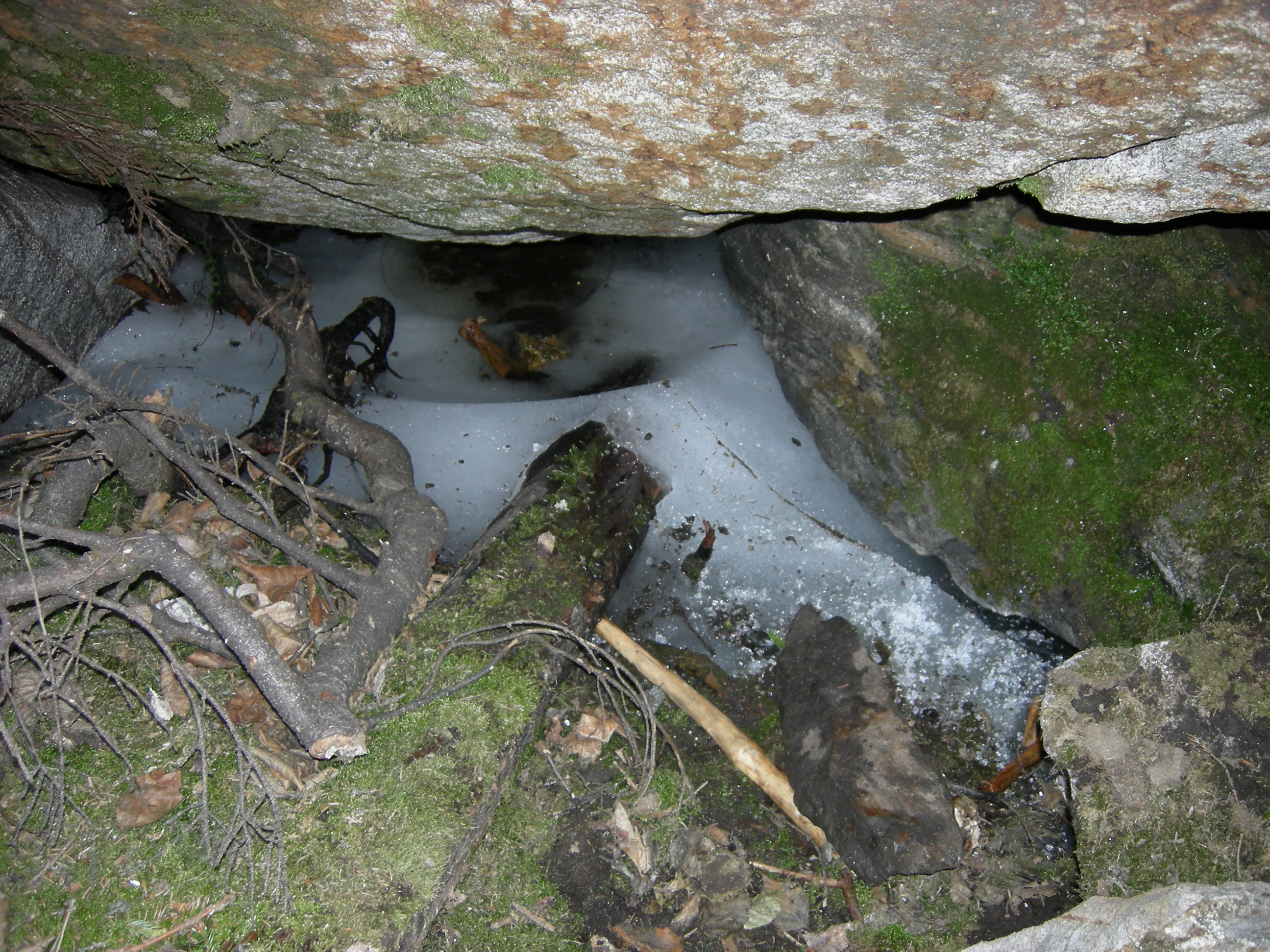
Pockets of ice can be found under the boulders even in the heat of July.
