= Bear River (Androscoggin River tributary) =

Coordinates: 44.48645°N 70.78535°W

Location
- Country: United States

Physical characteristics
- Source
  - location: Maine

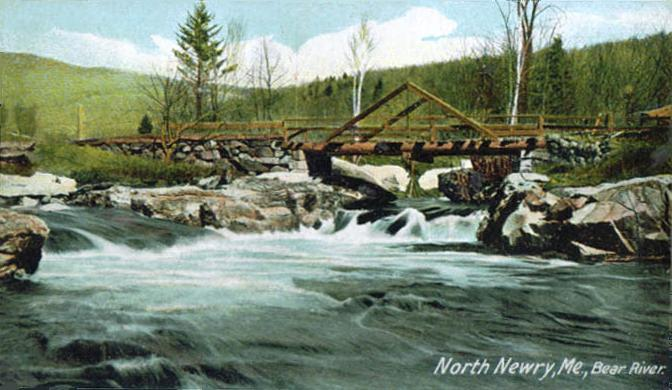
Bear River, North Newry, Maine.

The Bear River is a 14.6-mile-long (23.5 km) tributary of the Androscoggin River in the U.S. state of Maine. It rises in Grafton Notch at the northeastern end of the Mahoosuc Range and flows southeast, joining the Androscoggin in the town of Newry. Maine Route 26 follows the entire course of the river.

== See also ==
- List of rivers of Maine
