= Chickwolnepy Stream =

- Location within New Hampshire Location within the United States

Location
- Country: United States
- State: New Hampshire
- County: Coos
- Towns & townships: Success, Cambridge, Milan

Physical characteristics
- Source: Success Pond
  - location: Success
  - coordinates: 44°34′41″N 71°2′55″W
  - elevation: 1,601 ft (488 m)
- Mouth: Androscoggin River
  - location: Milan
  - coordinates: 44°35′14″N 71°11′13″W
  - elevation: 1,100 ft (340 m)
- Length: 14.2 mi (22.9 km)

Chickwolnepy Stream, also called Chickwollopy, is a 14.2-mile-long (22.9 km) river in northern New Hampshire in the United States. It is a tributary of the Androscoggin River, which flows south and east into Maine, joining the Kennebec River near the Atlantic Ocean.

== Etymology ==
There are two names in local usage for the stream, Chickwollopy and Chickwolnepy, the latter of which is the official name. Both names derive from the Arosaguntacook dialect of the Abenaki language. "Chickwollopy" coming from the words chegual and aki, thus meaning "frog place" or "land where frogs dwell". "Chickwolnepy" comes from the words chegual and nebe meaning "frog pond", a reference to it being the only brook in the area rising from a pond.

== Description ==
Chickwolnepy Stream rises at the outlet of Success Pond in the township of Success, New Hampshire. The stream flows generally west to the Androscoggin River in the town of Milan, passing briefly through the township of Cambridge. The stream passes Cambridge Black Mountain and Bald Mountain, staying in a wooded valley where logging is prevalent.

== See also ==
- List of rivers of New Hampshire
