= North Bald Cap =

Mountain in New Hampshire, United States

Coordinates: 44°27′57″N 71°4′25″W

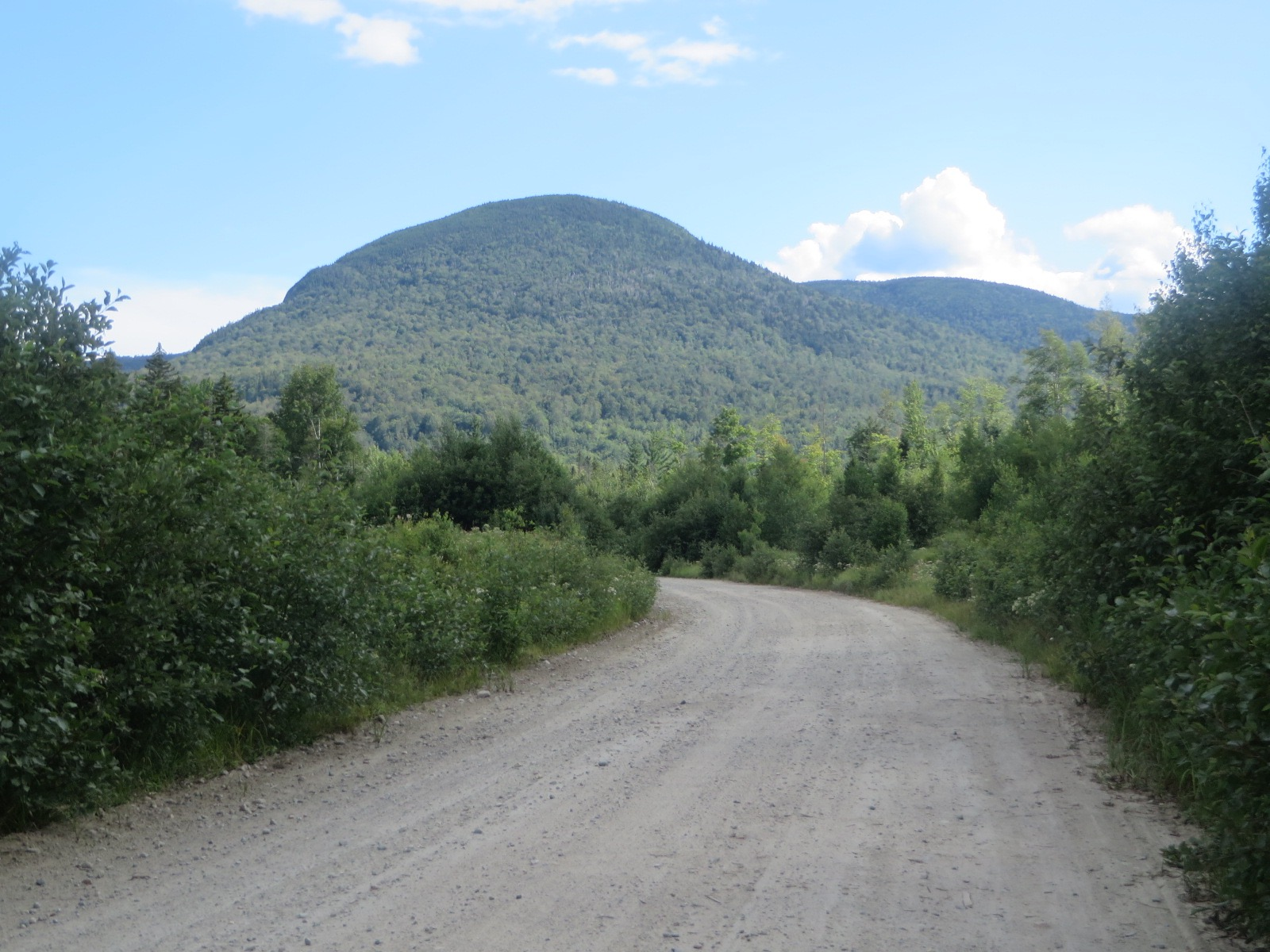
North Bald Cap from Success Pond Road

North Bald Cap, formerly known as Mount Success, is a mountain located in Coos County, New Hampshire. The mountain has an elevation of 2,893 feet (882 m) and is a part of the Mahoosuc Range of the White Mountains.

== Description ==
The mountain is flanked by Mount Success to the northeast and Bald Cap mountain to the southwest. There is currently no trail to the summit of North Bald Cap, but access can be gained by following Ball Cap Road, off Success Pond Road, to a swamp at the end of an old skid road to the south of the mountain. From there one must bushwhack to the summit. On the northeast side of the mountain, there are ledges that are popular with mountain climbers.

The mountain is part of the Androscoggin River watershed. The east side of the mountain drains to the North Branch of Horne Brook, while the west side drains to the South Branch of Horne Brook. The two branches flow north to form Horne Brook, which flows northwest to the Androscoggin in the northeast part of Berlin.

== Name ==
Before 1936, the mountain was known as "Mount Success", with the mountain today known by that name being called "Ingalls Mountain". With the renaming of Ingalls Mountain to Mount Success, North Bald Cap received its present name.

Many locals refer to the mountain as "Bald Cap Dome", due to its domed shape, a term which is said to be a leftover from the old logging days.
