= John M. Philbrook =

American politician

John M. Philbrook (1840–1923) was an American politician from Maine. A Republican, Philbrook served a term in the Maine House of Representatives (1893–1894) and in the Maine Senate (1903–1904) from Bethel, Maine. He also served as an Oxford County Commissioner. The John Philbrook House in Bethel was built by Philbrook and is named in his honor. It is on the National Register of Historic Places.

Philbrook was born in 1840 in Shelburne, New Hampshire and studied at Gould Academy in Bethel before settling there in 1862.
