= Mount Success =

Mountain in Coos County, New Hampshire, United States

Coordinates: 44°28′17″N 71°02′20″W

- Ingalls Mountain

Highest point
- Elevation: 3,566 ft (1,087 m)

Mount Success, formerly Ingalls Mountain, is a mountain in the Mahoosuc Range with an elevation of 3,565 feet (1,087 m). It is located in Coos County, New Hampshire.

== Description ==
The mountain is flanked by North Bald Cap mountain to the southwest, Mount Carlo in Maine to the northeast, and The Outlook to the northwest. Its summit is crossed by the Mahoosuc Trail (part of the Appalachian Trail), and can also be accessed as a day hike via the Success Trail.

The mountain is entirely within the Androscoggin River watershed. The north and west sides of the mountain drain to the North Branch of Horne Brook and thence northwest to the Androscoggin in Berlin, while the south and east sides drain to tributaries of Lary Brook, which flows south to the Androscoggin in Gilead, Maine.

== History ==
In 1936, the peak, then known as "Ingalls Mountain", was renamed "Mount Success" to distinguish it from the nearby Mount Ingalls in Shelburne, New Hampshire. On November 30, 1954, Northeast Airlines Flight 792 took off from Laconia Municipal Airport with the hopes of landing at Berlin Regional Airport. With little visibility due to poor weather, the Douglas DC-3, carrying four crew members and three passengers, crashed near the summit of Mount Success. All the passengers survived the initial impact, but two later died while awaiting rescue.
