= Frank Philbrick =

American writer (born 1978)

- Born: Frank James Philbrick; May 23, 1978 (age 47) Northampton, Massachusetts, United States
- Occupation: Author, carpenter
- Genre: Non-fiction

Frank Philbrick (born May 23, 1978, in Northampton, Massachusetts) is a former professional baseball player turned carpenter and author. Philbrick co-authored his first book, The Backyard Lumberjack, alongside his father, Stephen Philbrick, in 2006.

After graduating from Brown University in the spring of 2001, where Philbrick was an English major and a left-handed pitcher, Philbrick signed a professional baseball contract with the Albany-Colonie Diamond Dogs of the independent Northeast League. Later that summer, Philbrick was released, but continued his career with the Berkshire Black Bears, who made their home at historic Wahconah Park in Pittsfield, Massachusetts. Having grown up in nearby Cummington, Massachusetts, Philbrick was a local favorite. After playing with the Berkshire Black Bears, Philbrick played in the Frontier League. In the spring of 2002, Philbrick retired from pitching and began work as an author and carpenter.

Frank's first book, The Backyard Lumberjack is a how-to guide and personal account of managing a woodlot. Drawing on a lifetime of personal experience with forestry, farming, and woodworking, the Philbricks impart both the technical and emotional aspects of the firewood process, detailing each step from tree to stove. The Backyard Lumberjack also shares tales of life in the rural hills of The Berkshires. As part of the publicity for The Backyard Lumberjack, Philbrick appeared on the CBS Early Show, The Leonard Lopate Show on WNYC, The Arnie Arnesen Show, The Rachel Maddow Show on Air America Radio, Martha Stewart Living Radio on Sirius Satellite Radio, and The Playboy Radio Show also on Sirius Satellite Radio. Philbrick and his father, Stephen, also appeared on The History Channel show, "Modern Marvels: The History of the Axe" where, using only a sharpened axe, the father-son team were filmed cutting down a pine tree measuring six feet in circumference. The show aired on May 30, 2008.

Publicity for The Backyard Lumberjack led to an unexpected foray into modeling. Magnum photographer Bruce Weber photographed Philbrick for a "L'Uomo Vogue" piece on American men's sports and Philbrick appeared in print and television advertisements photographed by Weber for the "American Living" ad campaign which aired during the 2008 Academy Awards. Philbrick subsequently appeared in the Rogues Gallery Spring/Summer 2008 lookbook.

Philbrick's next book project is underway. Using an extensive diary he kept while playing ball, Philbrick is translating his time in the minor leagues into his next non-fiction novel.

The Philbrick family has a strong literary and artistic tradition. Frank's father, Stephen, has published three books of poetry and is minister of the West Cummington Congregational Church. Frank's grandfather, Charles Horace Philbrick, was an award-winning poet and professor of English at Brown. Frank is also a cousin of bestselling author, winner of the 2000 National Book Award, and 2007 Pulitzer Prize nominee, Nathaniel Philbrick, best known for his books, In The Heart of the Sea; Mayflower; The Last Stand; Why Read Moby Dick; and Bunker Hill: a City, a Siege, a Revolution. Frank's mother, Ann Leone, is a published author and a professor of French Studies and Landscape Studies at Smith College. Frank's cousin Clancy Philbrick is a contemporary American artist.

Between writing projects, Philbrick works as a carpenter. Employing a technique dating back to Neolithic times, Philbrick designed and constructed two timber-framed barns - one in Berkshire County, Massachusetts and the other in Hampden County, Massachusetts. Philbrick also specializes in finish and restoration carpentry.

In 2012, Philbrick, along with his fiancé and their daughter, moved from the Greenpoint neighborhood of Brooklyn, New York to his childhood farm in Cummington, Massachusetts.

== Books ==
- The Backyard Lumberjack: The Ultimate Guide to Felling, Bucking, Splitting & Stacking. Frank Philbrick and Stephen Philbrick. North Adams, MA: Storey Publishing, LLC, 2006. ISBN 1-58017-651-8
