= Clancy Philbrick =

American contemporary artist (born 1986)

Clancy "C-Brick" Philbrick
- Also known as: Clancy, Clancy-Pants, Clarence Brick, Brick, C-Brick, and D'Brickashaw
- Born: Clarence Philbrick; April 24, 1986 (age 39)
- Occupation: Artist
- Years active: 2004–present

Clancy's Brain Rock in Stonington, CT.

Clarence Hunt Philbrick (born April 24, 1986 in Providence, Rhode Island) (commonly known as Clancy) is an American contemporary artist whose work includes painting, photography, sculpture, street art, and literature. Philbrick has lived and exhibited in Connecticut, New York City, New Zealand, San Francisco, Lake Tahoe, Denver, and Aspen, CO.

Clancy was raised in the sea-side town of Stonington, CT. He attended The Williams School in New London, CT graduating alongside pop singer Cassie Ventura. In high school Clancy won a public mural award allowing him to turn one of his paintings into a large public piece in downtown New London across from Wyland's painting The Great Sperm Whales. After high school Clancy attended Vassar College in Poughkeepsie, NY, receiving his bachelor's degree in studio art in 2008.

In 2009 Clancy painted a large rock into a pink brain, dubbed The Brain Rock, on the Connecticut shoreline sparking local controversy after an article on the rock was published in The Day and The New York Times. Although originally arrested for the act by Amtrak police on charges of trespass and criminal mischief, the case was eventually dropped. Later in 2009 Clancy helped create a monthly artistic and musical happening titled Art After Dark at the Mystic Arts Center in Mystic, CT. In February 2010 Clancy founded the By:Us Art Collective.

The Philbrick family has a strong literary and artistic tradition. Clancy is the grandson of award-winning poet Charles Philbrick, the nephew of author Stephen Philbrick, and the cousin of both bestselling author Nathaniel Philbrick and former professional baseball player turned author Frank Philbrick. In late 2010 Clancy completed his first collection of poems titled Stealing You From Nothing: The Journals of Clarence Brick, which remains unpublished.
