= Shelburne, New Hampshire =

- Town
- Seal

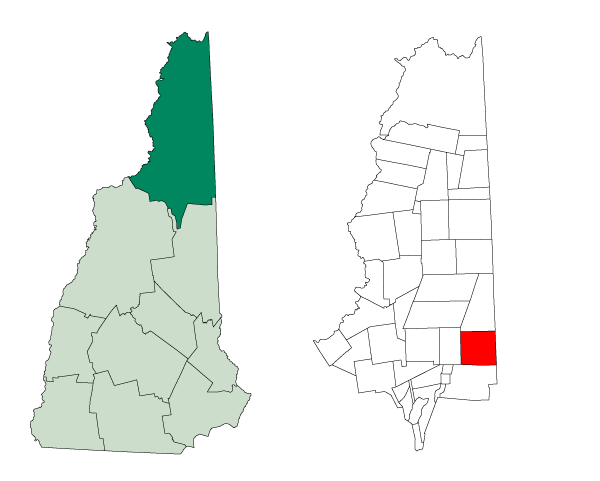
- Location in Coös County, New Hampshire
- Coordinates: 44°24′04″N 71°04′29″W
- Country: United States
- State: New Hampshire
- County: Coös
- Incorporated: 1820

Area
  - Total: 48.8 sq mi (126.3 km^{2})
  - Land: 47.9 sq mi (124.1 km^{2})
  - Water: 0.85 sq mi (2.2 km^{2}) 1.73%
- Elevation: 1,266 ft (386 m)

Population (2020)
  - Total: 353
  - Density: 7.3/sq mi (2.8/km^{2})
- Time zone: UTC-5 (Eastern)
  - Summer (DST): UTC-4 (Eastern)
- ZIP code: 03581
- Area code: 603
- FIPS code: 33-68980
- GNIS feature ID: 873720
- Website: www.townofshelburnenh.gov

Shelburne is a town in Coös County, New Hampshire, United States. The population was 353 at the 2020 census. It is located in the White Mountains, and part of the White Mountain National Forest is in the south. Shelburne is home to Leadmine State Forest. The Appalachian Trail crosses the town.

Shelburne is part of the Berlin, NH-VT Micropolitan Statistical Area.

== History ==
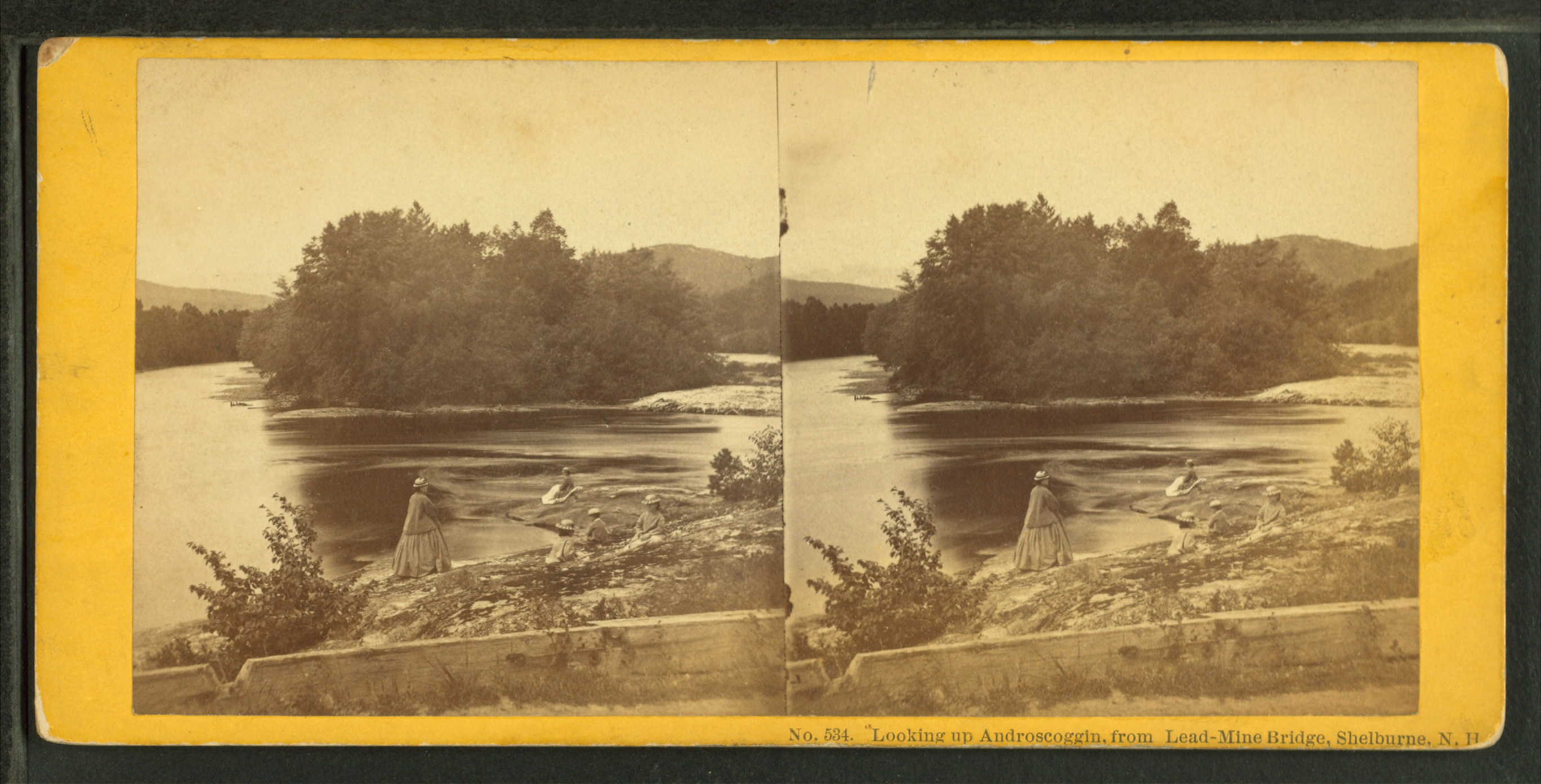
Looking up Androscoggin, from Lead-Mine Bridge, Shelburne, N.H.; stereographic card by John P. Soule

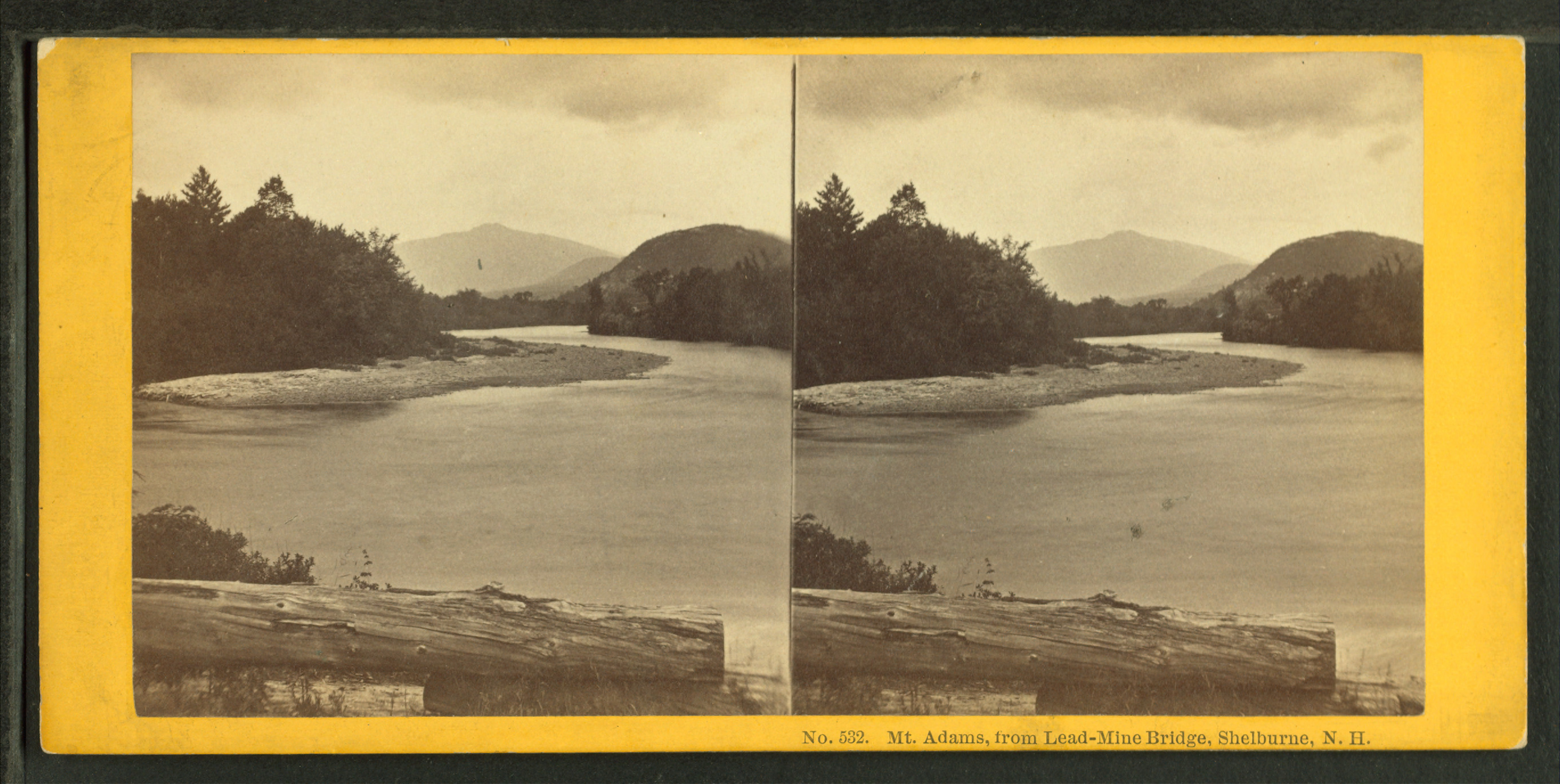
Mt. Adams, from Lead-Mine Bridge, Shelburne, N.H.

First granted in 1769 by Governor John Wentworth, the town was named for William Petty Fitzmaurice, Earl of Shelburne. He was a supporter of independence for the American colonies, and at his insistence, King George III recognized the independence of the United States. The town was first settled in 1771, and incorporated on December 13, 1820, when Shelburne voters chose to keep the name. It included "Shelburne Addition", that was set off and incorporated in 1836 as Gorham.

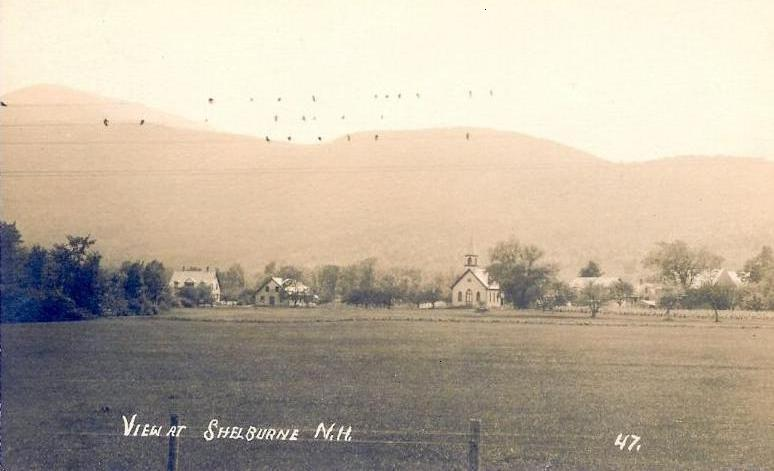
View at Shelburne c. 1915

On August 3, 1781, the town was attacked by a party of six Indians, who had earlier raided Bethel and Gilead, Maine. They killed one man and took another into captivity. The rest of the inhabitants fled to Hark Hill, where they spent the night before sheltering in Fryeburg.

Shelburne provided excellent soil for farming on either side of the Androscoggin River, but not far from the stream it becomes mountainous. The Atlantic and St. Lawrence Railroad, which opened to Gorham on July 23, 1851, and later became the Grand Trunk Railway, passed through the southern part of the town. In 1859, the population was 480.

Located at the northern end of the Mount Washington Valley, Shelburne has a beautiful grove of birch trees, popular with artists and photographers, dedicated to the town's soldiers who served in World War II.

== Geography ==
Shelburne is in northern New Hampshire, along the eastern edge of Coos County. According to the U.S. Census Bureau, the town has a total area of 48.8 square miles (126.3 km^{2}), of which 47.9 square miles (124.1 km^{2}) are land and 0.85 square miles (2.2 km^{2}) are water, comprising 1.73% of the town. Shelburne is drained by the Androscoggin River. Part of the Mahoosuc Range is in the north, while the northern end of the Carter-Moriah Range is to the south. The highest point in Shelburne is on the town's southern boundary at 3,970 feet (1,210 m) above sea level, just a few steps north of the 4,049-foot (1,234 m) summit of Mount Moriah.

The town is crossed by U.S. Route 2.

== Demographics ==
Historical population
Census	Pop.	Note	%±
1790	31		—
1800	45		45.2%
1810	176		291.1%
1820	205		16.5%
1830	312		52.2%
1840	350		12.2%
1850	480		37.1%
1860	318		−33.7%
1870	259		−18.6%
1880	252		−2.7%
1890	336		33.3%
1900	283		−15.8%
1910	305		7.8%
1920	178		−41.6%
1930	196		10.1%
1940	190		−3.1%
1950	184		−3.2%
1960	226		22.8%
1970	199		−11.9%
1980	318		59.8%
1990	437		37.4%
2000	379		−13.3%
2010	372		−1.8%
2020	353		−5.1%
U.S. Decennial Census

As of the census of 2000, there were 379 people, 156 households, and 114 families living in the town. The population density was 7.9 people per square mile (3.1/km^{2}). There were 197 housing units at an average density of 4.1 per square mile (1.6/km^{2}). The racial makeup of the town was 97.36% White, 0.26% Native American, 0.26% Asian, 0.26% from other races, and 1.85% from two or more races. Hispanic or Latino of any race were 1.06% of the population.

There were 156 households, out of which 31.4% had children under the age of 18 living with them, 67.9% were married couples living together, 2.6% had a female householder with no husband present, and 26.9% were non-families. 20.5% of all households were made up of individuals, and 6.4% had someone living alone who was 65 years of age or older. The average household size was 2.43 and the average family size was 2.85.

In the town, the population was spread out, with 23.5% under the age of 18, 4.5% from 18 to 24, 21.4% from 25 to 44, 34.3% from 45 to 64, and 16.4% who were 65 years of age or older. The median age was 45 years. For every 100 females, there were 106.0 males. For every 100 females age 18 and over, there were 107.1 males.

The median income for a household in the town was $44,375, and the median income for a family was $59,375. Males had a median income of $36,000 versus $22,188 for females. The per capita income for the town was $24,899. About 2.9% of families and 3.7% of the population were below the poverty line, including none of those under age 18 and 13.5% of those age 65 or over.

=== Adjacent municipalities ===
- Success (north)
- North Oxford, Maine (northeast)
- Gilead, Maine (east)
- South Oxford, Maine (southeast)
- Bean's Purchase (south)
- Gorham (west)

== Notable people ==
- Matt Bevin (born 1967), businessperson, governor of Kentucky (R; 2015–2019)
- John M. Philbrook (1840–1923), Maine legislator
- Anne Whitney (1821–1915), American sculptor, poet

== See also ==
- White Mountain art
