= Dead Cambridge River =

Coordinates: 44.71255°N 71.01730°W

Location
- Country: United States

Physical characteristics
- Source
  - location: Maine

The Dead Cambridge River is a 9.9-mile-long (15.9 km) river in northwestern Maine. It is a tributary of Lake Umbagog, the outflow of which is the Androscoggin River, flowing to the tidal Kennebec River and the Atlantic Ocean. The dead title is somewhat common on slow moving, flat rivers in the state of Maine. There is a river just named, "The Dead river", which has an Upper and Lower dead river that both connect to it as well. There is also an Oil company named Dead river oil that services all of Maine as well as other parts of New England.

== See also ==
- List of rivers of Maine
