= Mahoosuc Range =

Mountain range in the United States

Highest point
- Peak: Old Speck Mountain
- Elevation: 1,270 m (4,170 ft)
- Coordinates: 44°34′15″N 70°57′18″W

Dimensions
- Length: 25 km (16 mi) NE–SW
- Width: 5 km (3.1 mi)

Geography
- Country: United States
- States: Maine and New Hampshire
- Range coordinates: 44°30′N 71°0′W
- Parent range: White Mountains, Appalachian Mountains

The Mahoosuc Range, a northern extension of the White Mountains, straddles the border between New Hampshire and Maine. The range's highest peak, 4,170-foot (1,270 m) Old Speck Mountain, is the fifth-highest peak in Maine. Substantial parts of the range are publicly owned as parts of the National Park Service Appalachian Trail corridor and Grafton Notch State Park in Maine. The range is a subrange of the Appalachian Mountains.

The Appalachian Trail traverses the main ridge of the Mahoosucs between Shelburne, New Hampshire and Grafton Notch in Maine. Mahoosuc Notch, considered one of the most difficult sections of the Appalachian Trail, cuts a deep cleft in the middle of the range between Mahoosuc Mountain and Fulling Mill Mountain.

The exact origins of the word are unknown. One possibility is that it comes from the Abenaki phrase meaning “abode of hungry animals”. It is also plausible that the name corresponds to the Massachusett for “mountain peak”.

== Mountains ==
(from north to south)

- Old Speck Mountain 4,170 ft
- Mahoosuc Arm 3,790 ft
- Mahoosuc Mountain 3,490 ft
- Fulling Mill Mountain 3,450 ft
- Goose Eye Mountain, West Pk. 3,870 ft
  - Goose Eye, North Pk. 3,650 ft
  - Goose Eye, East Pk. 3,794 ft
- Mount Carlo 3,565 ft
- Mount Success 3,565 ft
- North Bald Cap 2,893 ft
- Bald Cap 3,065 ft
- Bald Cap Peak 2,785 ft
- Cascade Mountain 2,631 ft
- Mount Hayes 2,555 ft

== See also ==
- List of subranges of the Appalachian Mountains
- White Mountains (New Hampshire)
- Vegetation of New England and the Maritime Provinces
