= List of New England Hundred Highest =

The New England Hundred Highest is a list of the hundred highest summits in New England, used in the mountaineering sport of peak bagging. The list is a superset of the New England Four-thousand footers, with the same requirement that each included peak must have 200 feet (61 meters) of topographic prominence ("optimistic" prominence, equivalent to 160 ft (49 m) of "clean" prominence).

The order and elevation figures are those listed on the official list; other sources may differ.

== List ==
Rank	Name	State	Elevation	
1	Mount Washington	New Hampshire	6,288 ft	(1,917 m)
2	Mount Adams	New Hampshire	5,774 ft	(1,760 m)
3	Mount Jefferson	New Hampshire	5,712 ft	(1,741 m)
4	Mount Monroe	New Hampshire	5,384 ft	(1,641 m)
5	Mount Madison	New Hampshire	5,367 ft	(1,636 m)
6	Katahdin, Baxter Peak	Maine	5,268 ft	(1,606 m)
7	Mount Lafayette	New Hampshire	5,249 ft	(1,600 m)
8	Mount Lincoln	New Hampshire	5,089 ft	(1,551 m)
9	South Twin Mountain	New Hampshire	4,902 ft	(1,494 m)
10	Carter Dome	New Hampshire	4,832 ft	(1,473 m)
11	Mount Moosilauke	New Hampshire	4,802 ft	(1,464 m)
12	Mount Eisenhower	New Hampshire	4,780 ft	(1,460 m)
13	North Twin Mountain	New Hampshire	4,761 ft	(1,451 m)
14	Katahdin, Hamlin Peak	Maine	4,756 ft	(1,450 m)
15	Mount Carrigain	New Hampshire	4,700 ft	(1,435 m)
16	Mount Bond	New Hampshire	4,698 ft	(1,432 m)
17	Middle Carter Mountain	New Hampshire	4,610 ft	(1,405 m)
18	West Bond	New Hampshire	4,540 ft	(1,385 m)
19	Mount Garfield	New Hampshire	4,500 ft	(1,370 m)
20	Mount Liberty	New Hampshire	4,459 ft	(1,359 m)
21	South Carter Mountain	New Hampshire	4,430 ft	(1,350 m)
22	Wildcat Mountain, "A" Peak	New Hampshire	4,422 ft	(1,348 m)
23	Mount Hancock	New Hampshire	4,420 ft	(1,345 m)
24	Mount Mansfield	Vermont	4,393 ft	(1,339 m)
25	Kinsman Mountain, South Peak	New Hampshire	4,358 ft	(1,328 m)
26	Mount Field	New Hampshire	4,340 ft	(1,325 m)
27	Mount Osceola	New Hampshire	4,340 ft	(1,325 m)
28	Mount Flume	New Hampshire	4,328 ft	(1,319 m)
29	Mount Hancock, South Peak	New Hampshire	4,319 ft	(1,316 m)
30	Mount Pierce	New Hampshire	4,310 ft	(1,314 m)
31	Kinsman Mountain, North Peak	New Hampshire	4,293 ft	(1,309 m)
32	Mount Willey	New Hampshire	4,285 ft	(1,306 m)
33	Bondcliff	New Hampshire	4,265 ft	(1,300 m)
34	Mount Zealand	New Hampshire	4,260 ft	(1,300 m)
35	Sugarloaf Mountain	Maine	4,250 ft	(1,295 m)
36	Killington Peak	Vermont	4,235 ft	(1,291 m)
37	Crocker Mountain	Maine	4,228 ft	(1,289 m)
38	Mount Tripyramid, North Peak	New Hampshire	4,180 ft	(1,275 m)
39	Mount Cabot	New Hampshire	4,170 ft	(1,270 m)
40	Old Speck Mountain	Maine	4,170 ft	(1,270 m)
41	East Osceola	New Hampshire	4,156 ft	(1,267 m)
42	North Brother	Maine	4,151 ft	(1,265 m)
43	Mount Bigelow, West Peak	Maine	4,145 ft	(1,263 m)
44	Mount Tripyramid, Middle Peak	New Hampshire	4,140 ft	(1,260 m)
45	Saddleback Mountain	Maine	4,120 ft	(1,256 m)
46	Cannon Mountain	New Hampshire	4,100 ft	(1,250 m)
47	Mount Bigelow, Avery Peak	Maine	4,090 ft	(1,245 m)
48	Camel's Hump	Vermont	4,083 ft	(1,244 m)
49	Mount Ellen	Vermont	4,083 ft	(1,244 m)
50	Mount Hale	New Hampshire	4,054 ft	(1,236 m)
51	Mount Jackson	New Hampshire	4,052 ft	(1,235 m)
52	Mount Tom	New Hampshire	4,051 ft	(1,235 m)
53	Mount Abraham	Maine	4,050 ft	(1,235 m)
54	South Crocker Mountain	Maine	4,050 ft	(1,235 m)
55	Wildcat Mountain, "D" Peak	New Hampshire	4,050 ft	(1,235 m)
56	Mount Moriah	New Hampshire	4,049 ft	(1,234 m)
57	Mount Passaconaway	New Hampshire	4,043 ft	(1,232 m)
58	Owl's Head	New Hampshire	4,025 ft	(1,227 m)
59	Galehead Mountain	New Hampshire	4,024 ft	(1,227 m)
60	Saddleback Horn	Maine	4,023 ft	(1,226 m)
61	Mount Whiteface	New Hampshire	4,020 ft	(1,225 m)
62	Mount Redington	Maine	4,010 ft	(1,220 m)
63	Spaulding Mountain	Maine	4,010 ft	(1,220 m)
64	Mount Abraham	Vermont	4,006 ft	(1,221 m)
65	Mount Waumbek	New Hampshire	4,006 ft	(1,221 m)
66	Mount Isolation	New Hampshire	4,004 ft	(1,220 m)
67	Mount Tecumseh	New Hampshire	3,997 ft	(1,218 m)
68	Sandwich Mountain	New Hampshire	3,980 ft	(1,215 m)
69	South Brother	Maine	3,970 ft	(1,210 m)
70	Snow Mountain	Maine	3,960 ft	(1,207 m)
71	Pico Peak	Vermont	3,957 ft	(1,206 m)
72	The Bulge	New Hampshire	3,950 ft	(1,205 m)
73	Stratton Mountain	Vermont	3,940 ft	(1,201 m)
74	Mount Nancy	New Hampshire	3,926 ft	(1,197 m)
75	The Horn	New Hampshire	3,905 ft	(1,190 m)
76	Mount Weeks	New Hampshire	3,901 ft	(1,189 m)
77	South Weeks	New Hampshire	3,885 ft	(1,184 m)
78	Goose Eye Mountain	Maine	3,870 ft	(1,180 m)
79	Vose Spur	New Hampshire	3,862 ft	(1,177 m)
80	Fort Mountain	Maine	3,861 ft	(1,177 m)
81	Jay Peak	Vermont	3,858 ft	(1,176 m)
82	White Cap Mountain	Maine	3,856 ft	(1,175 m)
83	"Boundary Peak"	Maine	3,855 ft	(1,175 m)
84	Equinox Mountain	Vermont	3,850 ft	(1,175 m)
85	Mendon Peak	Vermont	3,850 ft	(1,175 m)
86	The Sleepers, East Peak	New Hampshire	3,840 ft	(1,170 m)
87	Bread Loaf Mountain	Vermont	3,835 ft	(1,169 m)
88	"Nubble Peak"	New Hampshire	3,813 ft	(1,162 m)
89	Mount Bigelow, South Horn	Maine	3,805 ft	(1,160 m)
90	Mount Coe	Maine	3,795 ft	(1,157 m)
91	East Kennebago Mountain	Maine	3,791 ft	(1,155 m)
92	Mount Wilson	Vermont	3,790 ft	(1,155 m)
93	Big Jay	Vermont	3,786 ft	(1,154 m)
94	Snow Mountain	Maine	3,784 ft	(1,153 m)
95	Baldpate Mountain	Maine	3,780 ft	(1,150 m)
96	Kennebago Divide	Maine	3,775 ft	(1,151 m)
97	Scar Ridge	New Hampshire	3,774 ft	(1,151 m)
98	Elephant Mountain	Maine	3,772 ft	(1,150 m)
99	Dorset Mountain	Vermont	3,770 ft	(1,150 m)
100	The Cannon Balls, NE Peak	New Hampshire	3,769 ft	(1,149 m)

== See also ==
- Northeast 111 4000-footers
  - New England Four-thousand footers
  - Adirondack Forty-sixers
- New England Fifty Finest
