= Mount Nancy =

Mountain in the state of New Hampshire

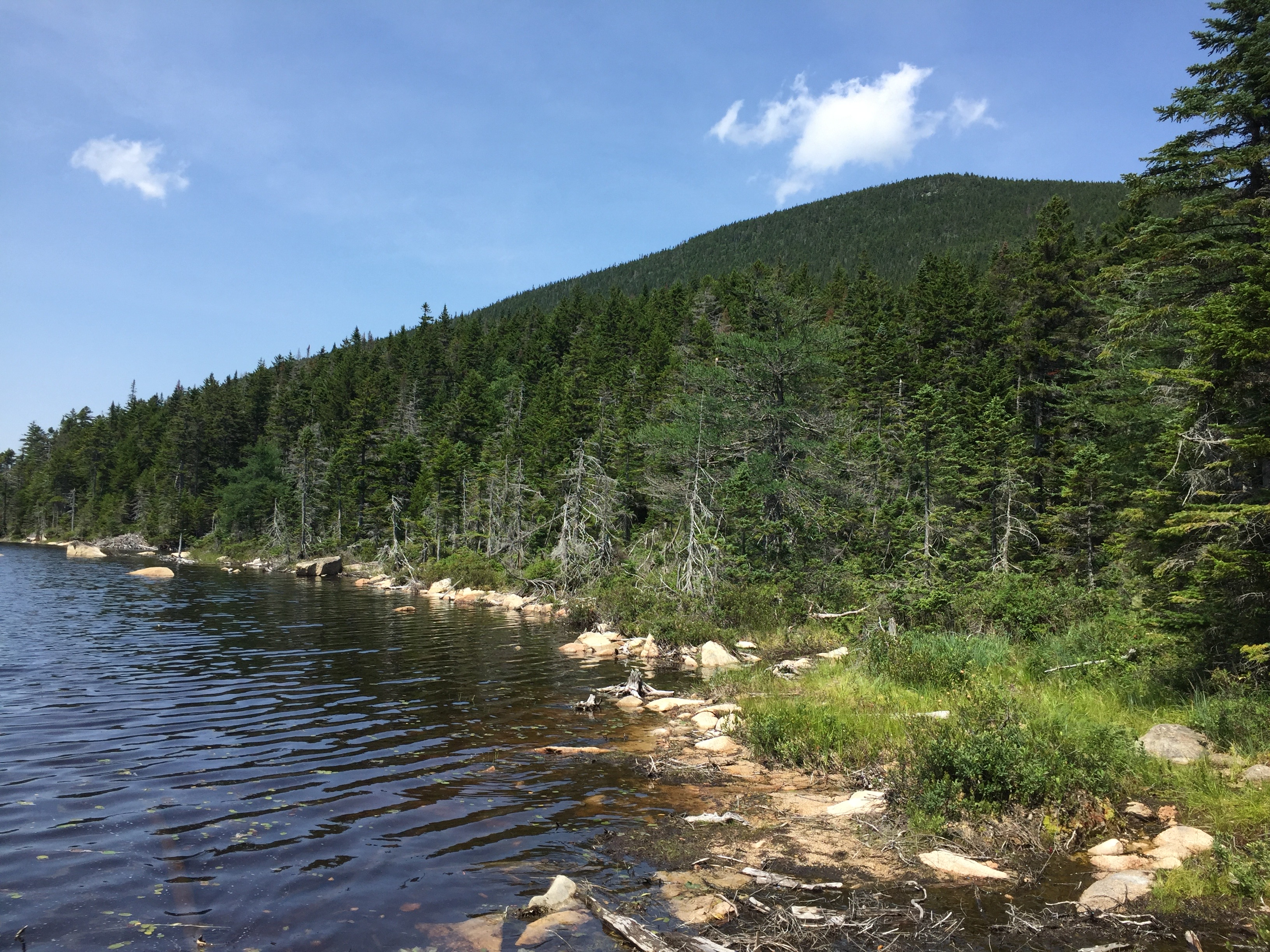
- Mount Nancy rising over Norcross Pond

Highest point
- Elevation: 3,926 ft (1,197 m)
- Prominence: 1,006 ft (307 m)
- Listing: #74 New England 100 Highest
- Coordinates: 44°07′21″N 71°24′17″W

Geography
- Location within New Hampshire
- Location: Grafton County, New Hampshire
- Parent range: Nancy Range
- Topo map: USGS Mount Carrigain

Climbing
- Easiest route: no official trail

Mount Nancy, formerly Mount Amorisgelu, is a mountain located in Grafton County, New Hampshire, on the eastern boundary of the Pemigewasset Wilderness of the White Mountains. The mountain is the highest point and namesake of the Nancy Range. Mt. Nancy is flanked to the northeast by Mount Bemis, to the southwest by Mount Anderson, and to the southeast by Duck Pond Mountain. Although Mount Nancy is officially trailless, a visible path climbs to the summit from Norcross Pond. With a summit elevation of 3,926 feet (1,197 m), it is one of the New England Hundred Highest peaks.

The southwest face of Mount Nancy drains into Norcross Brook, thence into the East Branch of the Pemigewasset River, the Merrimack River, and into the Gulf of Maine at Newburyport, Massachusetts. The northwest side of Mt. Nancy drains into Anderson Brook, and thence into Norcross Brook. The northeast and southeast sides of Mt. Nancy drain into Nancy Brook, thence into the Saco River, and into the Gulf of Maine at Saco, Maine.

== The legend of Nancy ==
Another spot of interest in [Crawford Notch] is Nancy's Brook. It was at the point where this stream comes foaming from Mount Nancy into the great ravine that the girl whose name is given to it was found frozen to death in a shroud of snow in the fall of 1788. She had set out alone from Jefferson in search of a young farmer who was to have married her, and walked thirty miles through trackless snow between sunset and dawn. Then her strength gave out and she sank beside the road never to rise again. Her recreant lover went mad with remorse when he learned the manner of her death and did not long survive her, and men who have traversed the savage passes of the Notch on chill nights in October have fancied that they heard, above the clash of the stream and whispering of the woods, long, shuddering groans mingled with despairing cries and gibbering laughter."

== See also ==
- List of mountains in New Hampshire
- White Mountain National Forest
- New England Hundred Highest
