= Owl's Head (Franconia, New Hampshire) =

Mountain in United States

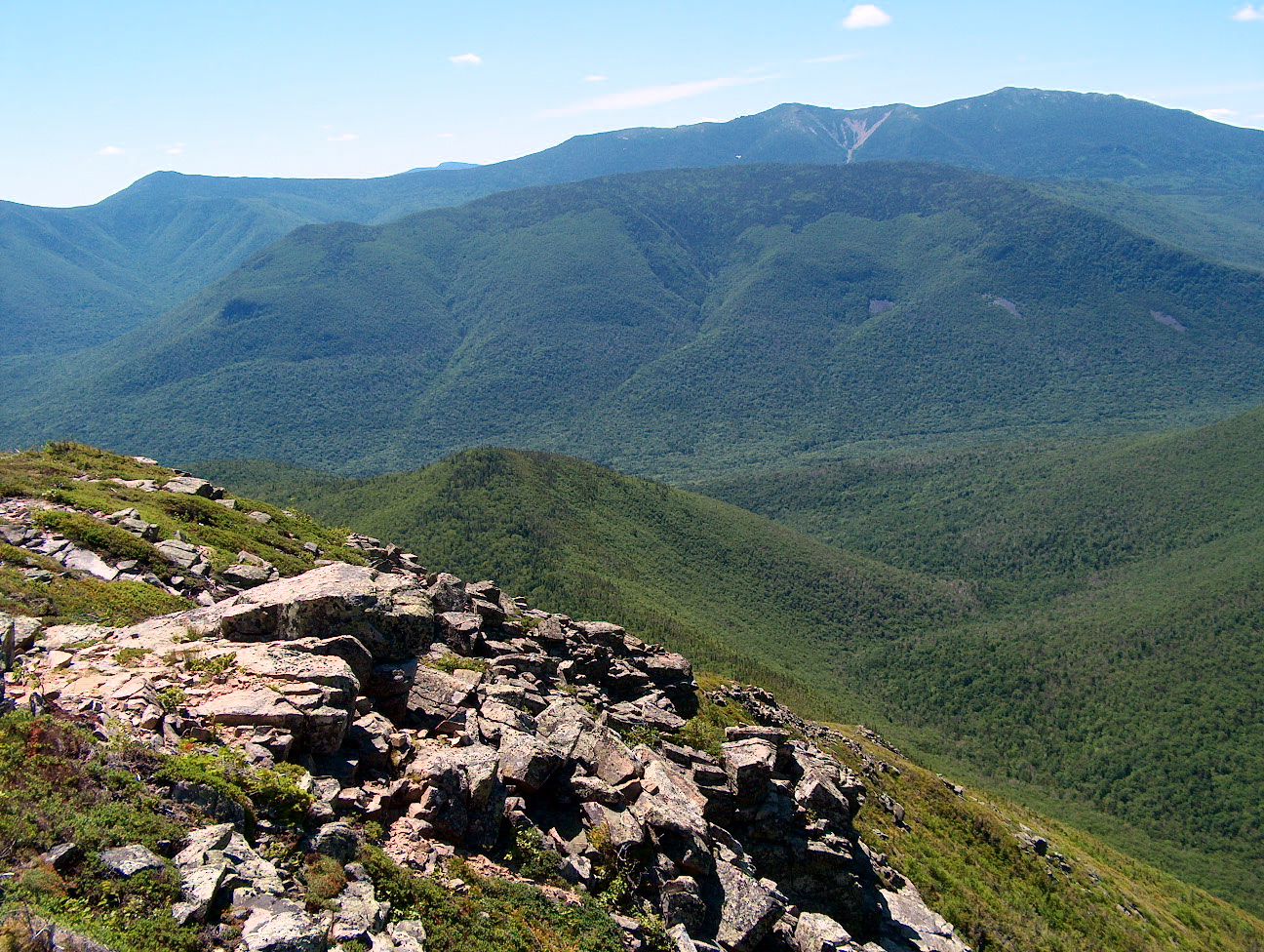
- Owl's Head from Bondcliff, with Franconia Ridge behind

Highest point
- Elevation: 4,025 ft (1,227 m)
- Prominence: 825 ft (251 m)
- Listing: White Mountain 4000-Footers
- Coordinates: 44°8′40″N 71°36′18″W

Geography
- Location: Franconia, New Hampshire, U.S.
- Parent range: White Mountains

Climbing
- Easiest route: Hike

Owl's Head is a 4,025-foot (1,227 m) mountain in Franconia, New Hampshire. It lies between the Franconia Branch of the Pemigewasset River (to its east) and Lincoln Brook (to its west and south), in the Pemigewasset Wilderness of the White Mountain National Forest.

It is best known as one of the 48 White Mountains "four-thousand footers", and stands out among them mostly for what it lacks:

- In height, it is 43rd of the 48.
- It is the only one of the 48 without an officially maintained path to the summit, although an unofficial, unmaintained herd path comes within 0.2 miles (300 m).
- The trees at its summit block (except when deep snow has fallen) any view beyond themselves. (There are, however, nice views from the Owls Head Slide while climbing up the unmaintained path to the summit.)
- It is remote from approaches by road, due to
  - the East Branch of the Pemigewasset River, between it and the Kancamagus Highway to the south,
  - Franconia Ridge (and its steep and tall east face), between it and Interstate 93 to the west,
  - Garfield Ridge, between it and U.S. Route 3 to the north, and
  - the Twin Range and Willey Range, between it and U.S. Route 302 to the east.

Probably for these reasons, it receives (as does Mount Isolation) a disproportionately frequent role as the last 4000-footer waiting to be climbed by those about to complete the list of 48.

In the fall of 2005, it was discovered that the traditional summit of Owl's Head (reached by the unmaintained beaten path) is actually a lower peak, and the true summit is approximately 0.2 mi north along the ridgeline. For now, the 4,000-footer committee is accepting climbs to the false summit.
