= Mount Carrigain =

Mountain in the state of New Hampshire

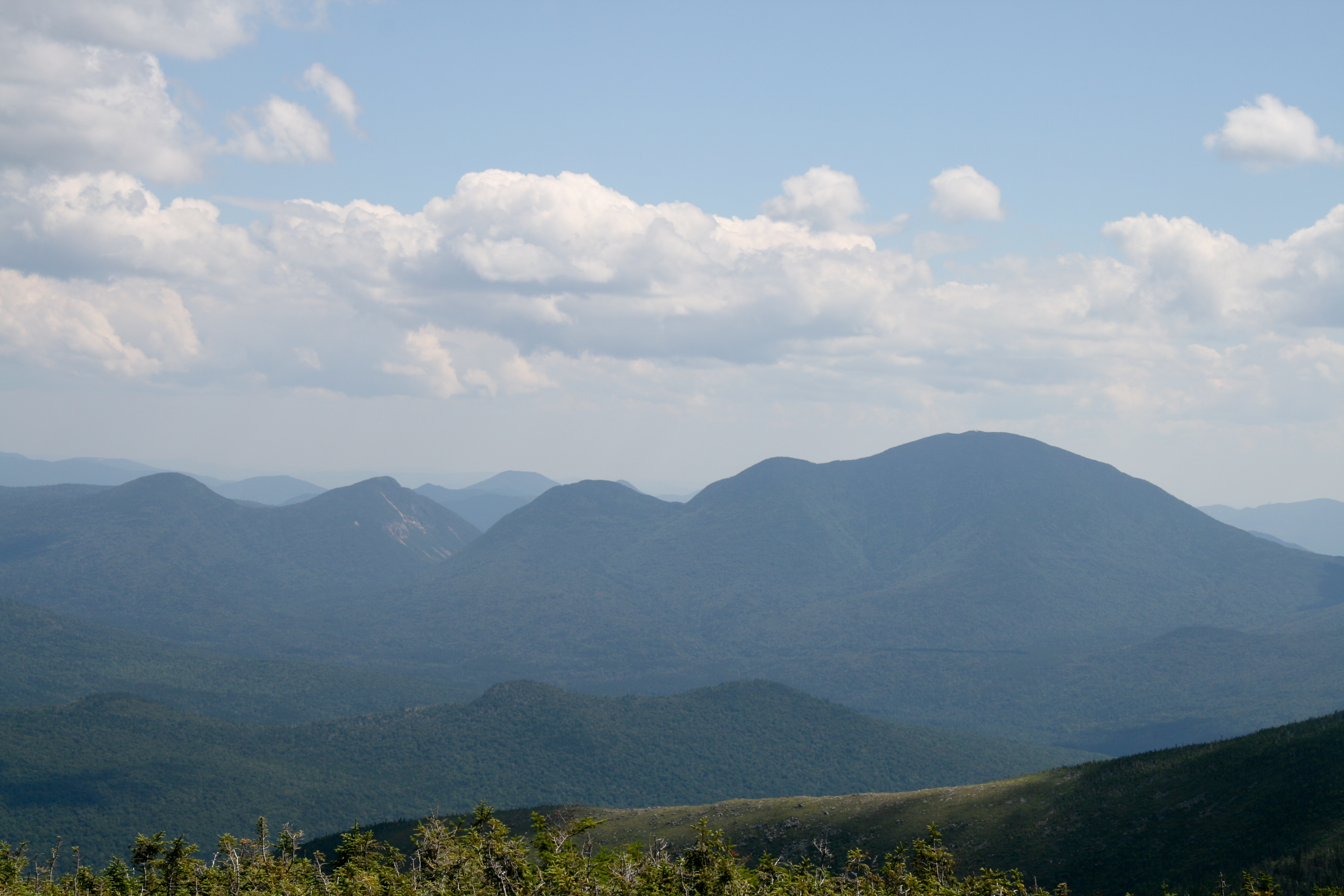
- View of Mt. Carrigain from Mt. Guyot, taken August 2009. Vose Spur is the knob roughly in the center of the photo, and Mount Lowell is to its left.

Highest point
- Elevation: 4,683 ft (1,427 m) NAVD 88
- Prominence: 2,223 ft (678 m)
- Listing: New Hampshire 4000-footers #27 New England Fifty Finest
- Coordinates: 44°05′37″N 71°26′48″W

Geography
- Location: Grafton County, New Hampshire, U.S.
- Topo map: USGS Mount Carrigain

Climbing
- First ascent: August 27, 1857; Arnold Guyot, S. Hastings Grant, and local guide Bill Hatch,
- Easiest route: maintained hiking trail

Mount Carrigain is a mountain located in Grafton County, New Hampshire. The mountain is named after Phillip Carrigain, NH Secretary of State (1805–10), and is on the south side of the Pemigewasset Wilderness, the source of the East Branch of the Pemigewasset River in the heart of the White Mountains, between Franconia Notch and Crawford Notch. Carrigain is flanked to the northeast beyond Carrigain's Vose Spur by Mount Anderson and Mount Lowell across Carrigain Notch, and to the southwest by Mount Hancock. It has a fire tower at the summit, providing 360 degree views of the surrounding wilderness.

== Geography ==
The south side of Mount Carrigain drains into the Sawyer River, thence into the Saco River, which drains into the Gulf of Maine at Saco, Maine. The east side of Mt. Carrigain drains into Carrigain Brook, thence into the Sawyer River. The north side of Carrigain drains into the East Branch of the Pemigewasset River, a tributary of the Merrimack River, which drains into the Gulf of Maine at Newburyport, Massachusetts. The west side of Carrigain drains into the Carrigain Branch of the East Branch of the Pemigewasset.

=== Climate ===
Climate data for Mount Carrigain 44.0915 N, 71.4483 W, Elevation: 4,196 ft (1,279 m) (1991–2020 normals)
Month	Jan	Feb	Mar	Apr	May	Jun	Jul	Aug	Sep	Oct	Nov	Dec	Year
Mean daily maximum °F (°C)	19.1 (−7.2)	20.6 (−6.3)	27.7 (−2.4)	41.0 (5.0)	53.8 (12.1)	62.1 (16.7)	66.7 (19.3)	65.4 (18.6)	59.4 (15.2)	47.2 (8.4)	34.3 (1.3)	24.6 (−4.1)	43.5 (6.4)
Daily mean °F (°C)	11.2 (−11.6)	12.4 (−10.9)	19.1 (−7.2)	31.7 (−0.2)	44.3 (6.8)	53.1 (11.7)	57.9 (14.4)	56.8 (13.8)	50.7 (10.4)	39.1 (3.9)	27.7 (−2.4)	17.8 (−7.9)	35.2 (1.7)
Mean daily minimum °F (°C)	3.3 (−15.9)	4.1 (−15.5)	10.4 (−12.0)	22.3 (−5.4)	34.8 (1.6)	44.2 (6.8)	49.1 (9.5)	48.2 (9.0)	42.0 (5.6)	31.0 (−0.6)	21.1 (−6.1)	11.1 (−11.6)	26.8 (−2.9)
Average precipitation inches (mm)	4.90 (124)	4.13 (105)	4.91 (125)	5.82 (148)	5.80 (147)	6.59 (167)	5.87 (149)	5.56 (141)	5.36 (136)	7.79 (198)	6.08 (154)	5.91 (150)	68.72 (1,744)
Source: PRISM Climate Group

== Vose Spur ==
Vose Spur

Highest point
- Elevation: 3,862 ft (1,177 m)
- Prominence: 222 ft (68 m)
- Listing: #79 New England 100 Highest
- Coordinates: 44°06′11″N 71°26′05″W

Geography
- Topo map: USGS Mount Carrigain

Climbing
- Easiest route: 10-mile (16 km) bushwhack, approx. 9 hours, via route below

Vose Spur is a subpeak of Mount Carrigain, named after George L. Vose. The summit is densely wooded. It is officially trailless and counts as one of New England's one hundred highest summits. Several different approaches are possible. A talus field on the eastern slope, can be reached by bushwhacking from the Carrigain Notch Trail and offers outstanding views into Carrigain Notch and over to Mount Lowell.

== See also ==
- List of mountains in New Hampshire
- White Mountain National Forest
- four-thousand footers
- New England Hundred Highest
- New England Fifty Finest
