= Mount Willey =

Mountain in the state of New Hampshire

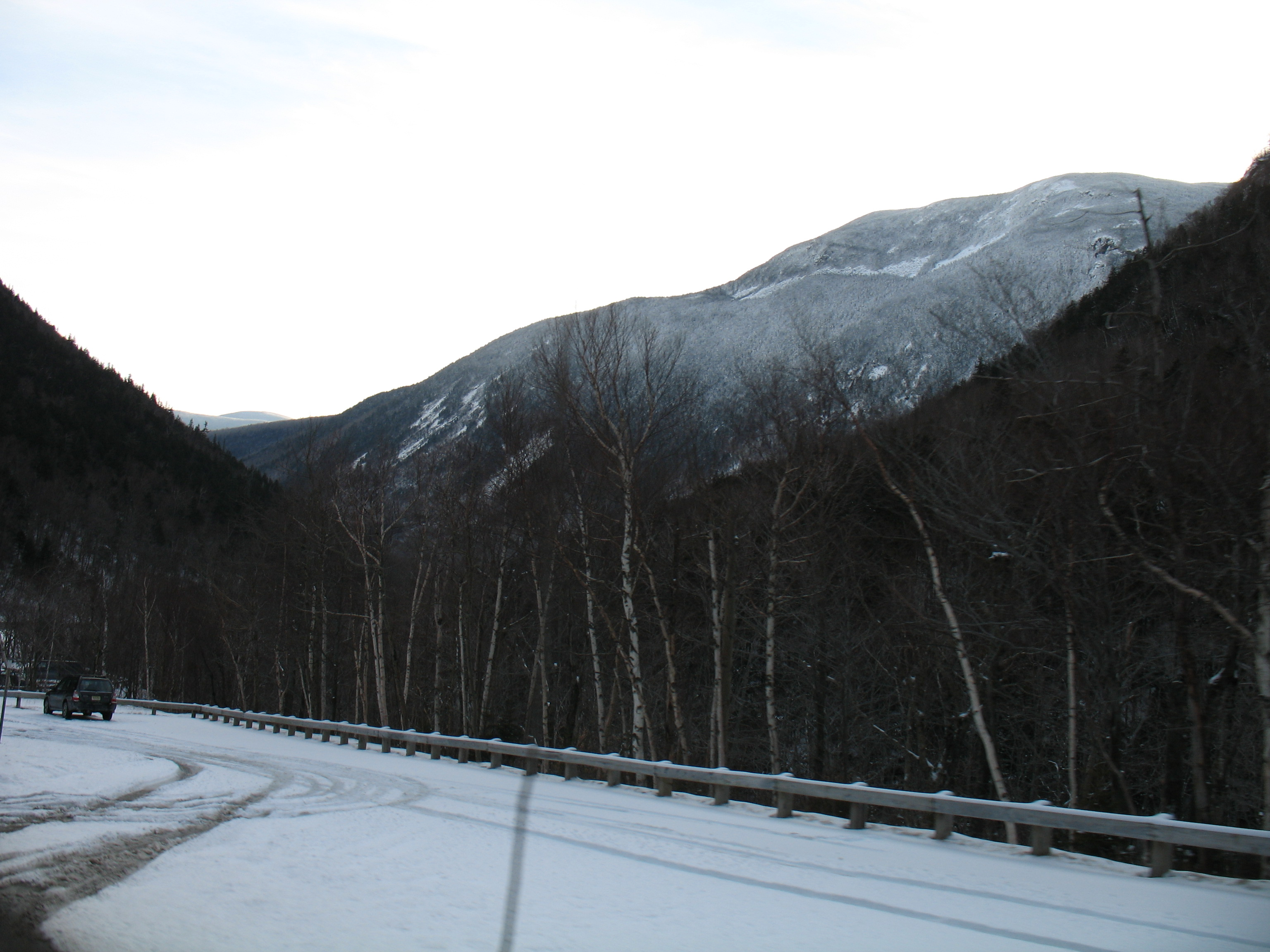
- Mount Willey from Crawford Notch looking south

Highest point
- Elevation: 1,297 m (4,255 ft)
- Prominence: 78 m (256 ft)
- Listing: White Mountain 4000-Footers
- Coordinates: 44°11′N 71°25′W

Geography
- Location: Grafton County, New Hampshire, U.S.
- Parent range: Willey Range
- Topo map: USGS Crawford Notch (NH)

Climbing
- Easiest route: Willey Range Trail via Mt. Field

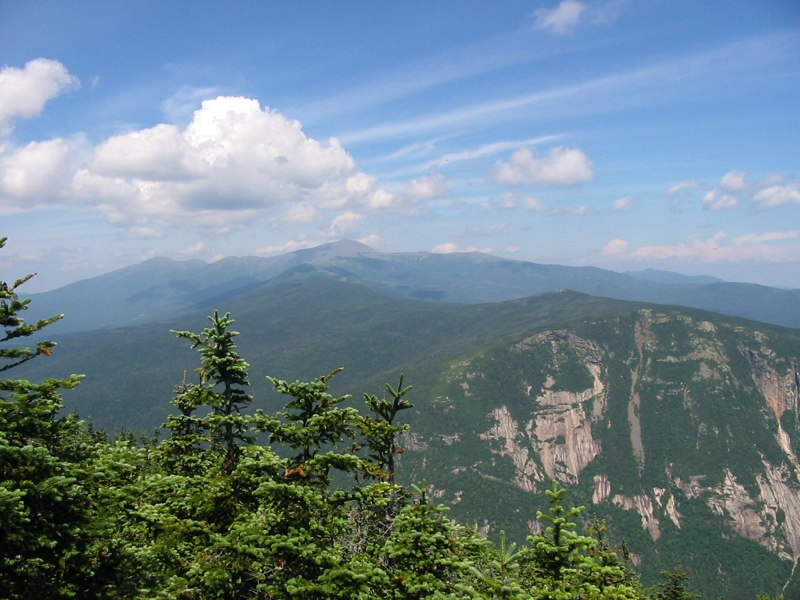
The view from the summit of Mt. Willey to the northeast, along the spine of the Presidential Range from Webster (right) to Jefferson.

Mount Willey is a mountain located in Grafton County, New Hampshire. The mountain is named after Samuel Willey, Jr. (1766–1826) and his family, who in 1825 moved into a house in Crawford Notch. The family was killed a year later in August 1826 during a landslide.

Mount Willey is part of the Willey Range of the White Mountains, of which it is the southernmost and second highest. It, along with Mount Field, forms the western wall of Crawford Notch. The summit is just outside the Crawford Notch State Park; it is at the northeast corner of the Pemigewasset Wilderness. Multiple hiking trails span through its area, including a portion of the Appalachian Trail. Higher elevations classify as a spruce-fir forest, hosting natural life commonly found in the White Mountains region.

The north and east faces of Mount Willey drain directly into the Saco River, thence into the Gulf of Maine at Saco, Maine. The south and west sides drain into the North Fork of the Pemigewasset River, thence into the East Branch, the Pemigewasset River, Merrimack River, and into the Gulf of Maine at Newburyport, Massachusetts.

== Connected Trails ==
This mountain can be traversed through a multitude of trails connecting over land in the White Mountains Range. Most frequently used is the Mount Willey Trail, which joins with surrounding trail junctions. The Ethan Pond Trail covers a longer distance and is classified as part of the Appalachian Trail. The Kedron Flume Trail spans a shorter distance and passes through the Kedron Flume waterfall. The Avalon Trail stems North from Mt. Field, and diverges into the A-Z Trail at half its length. The A-Z Trail runs from the Avalon trail to Zealand Hut.

=== Mount Willey Trail ===
The peak can be reached via the 4.8 mile long Mount Willey Trail, beginning at the Willey Station Road Parking Lot, which branches off from Route 302. It joins with the Ethan Pond Trail and passes through the junction of the A-Z trail. Beginning along the Ethan Pond Trail route, some of its early sections pass over railroad tracks and an old logging road. After a 1,200 foot ascent, it meets the junction of the Willey Range Trail, and follows a crossing over Kedron Brook. Known mostly for its numerous uphill and ladder sections, this trail provides a steep ascent to the mountain's summit. Following it will reveal expansive views of the Presidential Range and Crawford Notch to the east, and the Twin Range to the west.

== Biodiversity ==
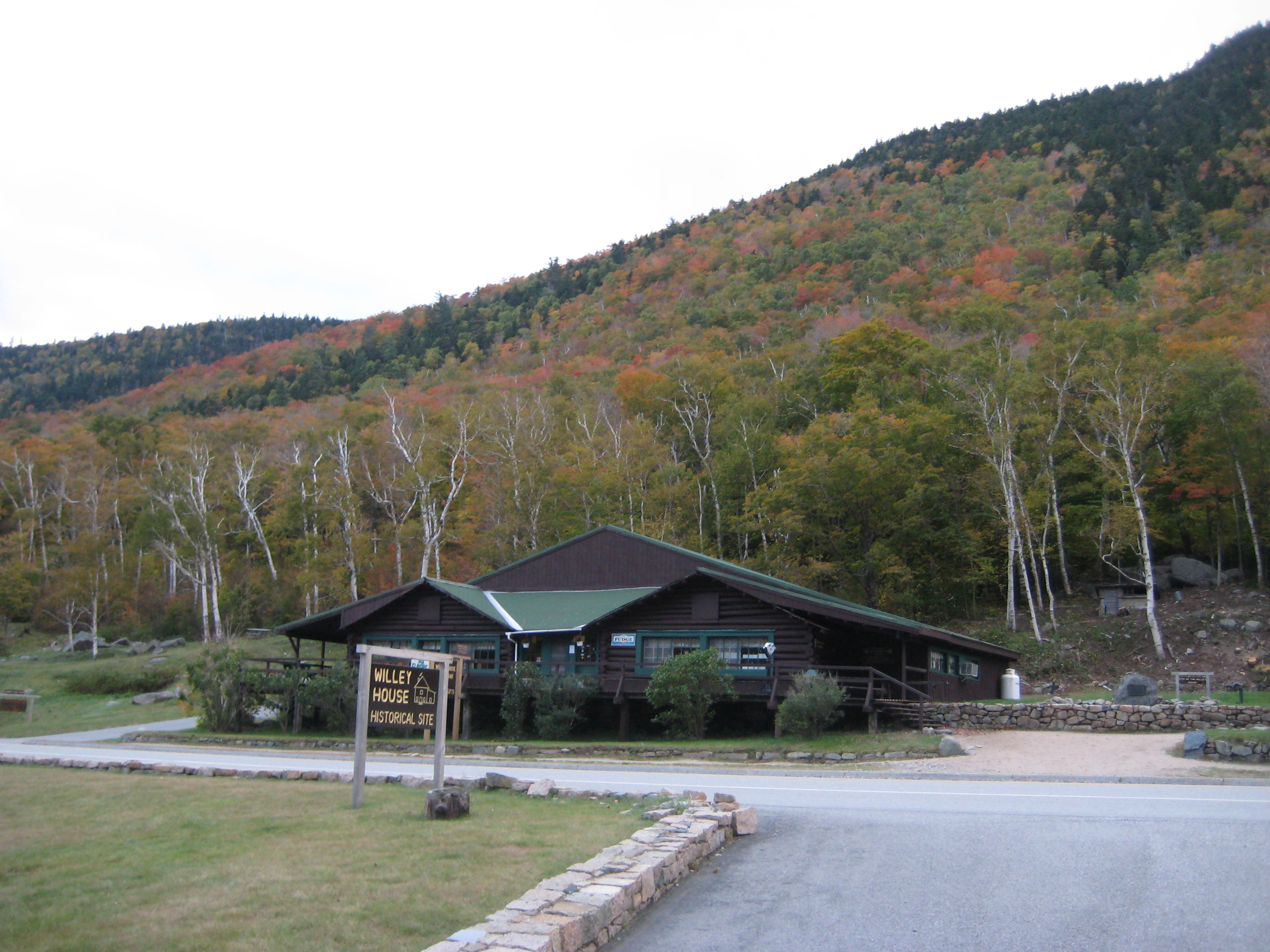
The Willey House and the surrounding Willey Mountain Range in New Hampshire, renovated for modern use. 2008.

As part of the White Mountain Range, Mt. Willey hosts similar wildlife and plant life to the neighboring elevated regions in New Hampshire. The most common trees populating the White Mountain region, and in turn, Mt. Willey, are red spruce, balsam fir, sugar maple, American beech and yellow birch. At higher elevations, balsam fir and red spruce become more populous. Commonly found understory shrubs are hobblebush, mountain maple, shield fern, and wood sorrel. Bird species often seen in its geographic area are yellow-bellied flycatchers, thrush, kinglets, warblers of various species, and white-throated sparrows.

== See also ==
- List of mountains in New Hampshire
- White Mountain National Forest
