= Mount Weeks =

Mountain in New Hampshire, US

Highest point
- Elevation: 1,189 m (3,901 ft)
- Prominence: 226 m (741 ft)
- Listing: #76 New England 100 Highest
- Coordinates: 44°27.69′N 71°22.91′W

Geography
- Location: Coos County, New Hampshire
- Parent range: Pliny Range
- Topo map: USGS Pliny Range

Mount Weeks, formerly Round Mountain, is a mountain located in Coos County, New Hampshire. Mt. Weeks is the northeasternmost of the Pliny Range of the White Mountains and the highest point within the city limits of Berlin, New Hampshire. Mount Weeks is flanked to the southwest by South Weeks, and faces Terrace Mountain to the northwest across Willard Notch.

== Description ==
Mount Weeks stands within the watershed of the upper Connecticut River, which drains into Long Island Sound in Connecticut. The southeast side of Mt. Weeks drains into Stony Brook, thence into the Upper Ammonoosuc River, a tributary of the Connecticut. The northeast side of Weeks drains into Brandy Brook, thence into the Upper Ammonoosuc. The northwest and southwest sides of Mt. Weeks drain into Garland Brook, thence into Stalbird Brook and the Israel River, another tributary of the Connecticut.

== History ==
The mountain, formerly known as Round Mountain, was renamed in honor of United States Senator John W. Weeks (1860–1926) of nearby Lancaster, New Hampshire in 1961. Senator Weeks sponsored the Weeks Act of 1911, under which the White Mountain National Forest was established.

== See also ==
- List of mountains in New Hampshire
- White Mountain National Forest
- New England Hundred Highest
