= North Fork East Branch Pemigewasset River =

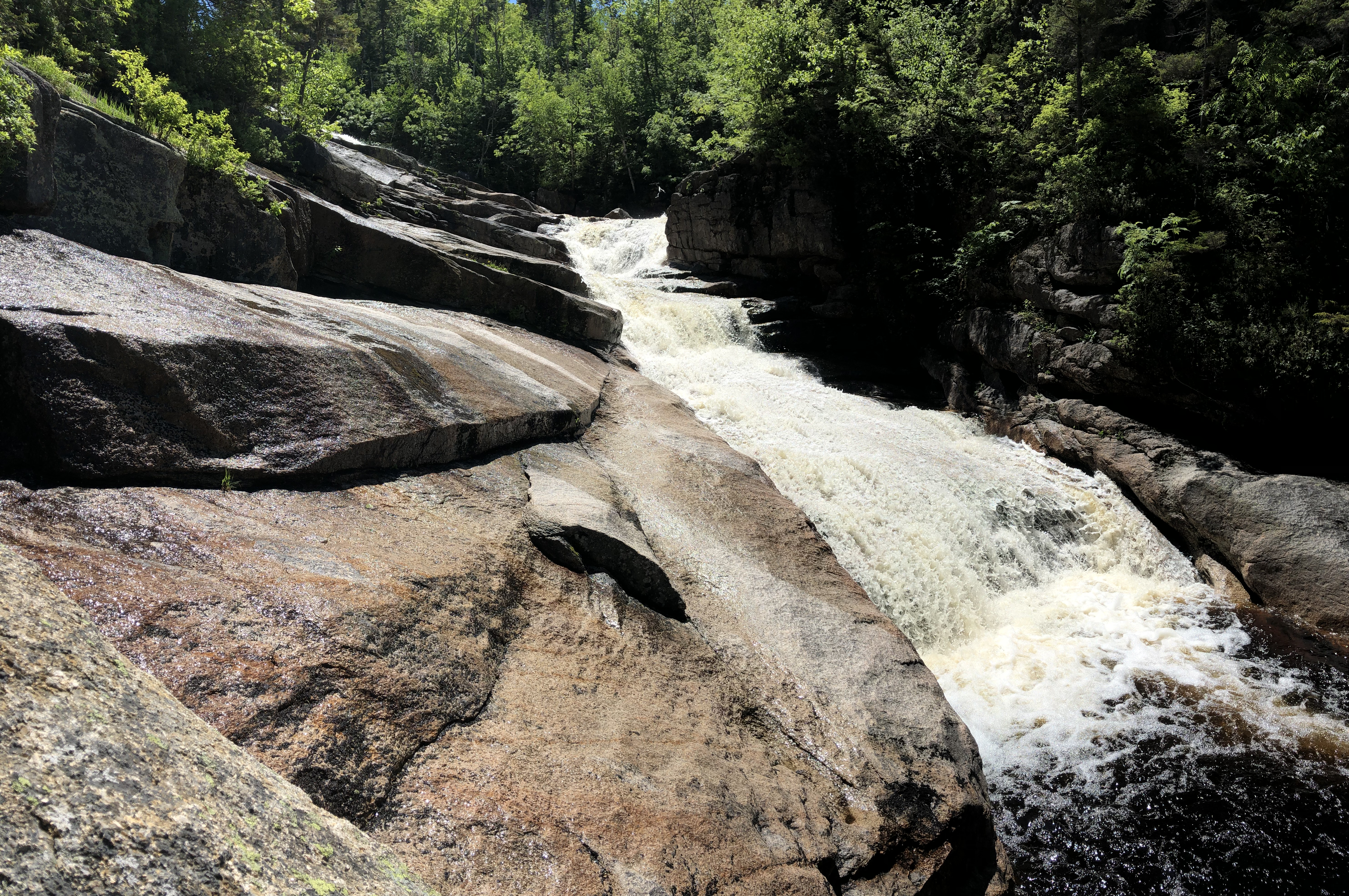
- Thoreau Falls on the North Fork East Branch

- Location within New Hampshire Location within the United States

Location
- Country: United States
- State: New Hampshire
- County: Grafton
- Towns: Bethlehem, Lincoln

Physical characteristics
- Source: Mount Field
  - location: Bethlehem
  - coordinates: 44°11′38″N 71°26′17″W
  - elevation: 3,600 ft (1,100 m)
- Mouth: East Branch Pemigewasset River
  - location: Lincoln
  - coordinates: 44°7′8″N 71°30′24″W
  - elevation: 1,715 ft (523 m)
- Length: 6.9 mi (11.1 km)

Basin features
- Tributaries
  - right: Whitewall Brook, Jumping Brook

The North Fork of the East Branch of the Pemigewasset River is a 6.9-mile-long (11.1 km) river located in the White Mountains of New Hampshire in the United States. It is a tributary of the East Branch of the Pemigewasset River, part of the Merrimack River watershed.

The North Fork begins on the south slopes of Mount Field in the southeast corner of the town of Bethlehem, within the White Mountain National Forest. The small stream flows south and picks up the outlet of Ethan Pond from the east, just north of the northeastern corner of the Pemigewasset Wilderness in the heart of the White Mountains. Now a river, the North Fork flows west and enters the town limits of Lincoln, the second-largest town by area in New Hampshire. Passing under the Appalachian Trail (and entering the Pemigewasset Wilderness), the North Fork drops over Thoreau Falls and encounters Whitewall Brook flowing south out of Zealand Notch. Turning southwest, the North Fork flows through a deep valley with Mount Bond to the west, and joins the East Branch of the Pemigewasset in a broad valley directly north of Mount Hancock.

The North Fork is paralleled by the Appalachian Trail from the Lincoln/Bethlehem town line to Thoreau Falls, and by the Thoreau Falls Trail from there to the East Branch of the Pemigewasset.

== See also ==
- List of rivers of New Hampshire
