= Mount Webster =

Mountain in New Hampshire, United States

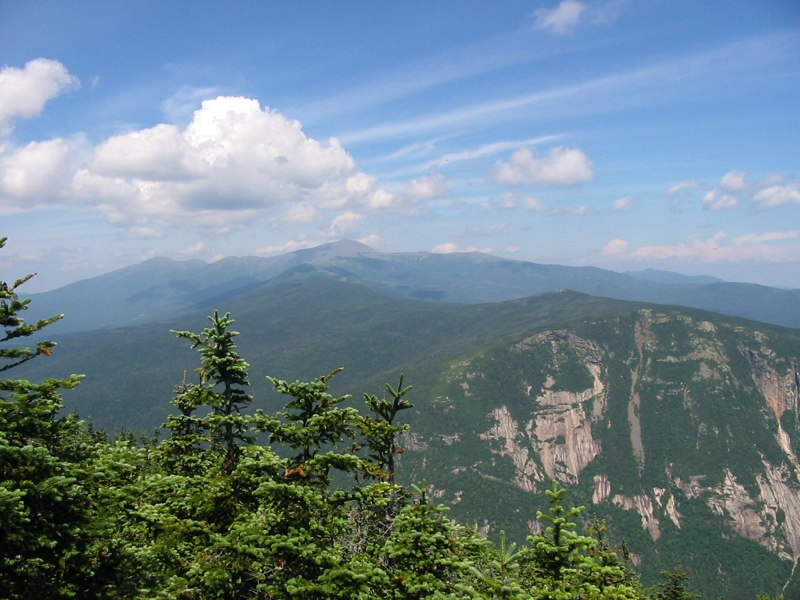
- The view from Mount Willey along the spine of the Presidential Range, from Jefferson (left background) to Mount Webster (right foreground).

Highest point
- Elevation: 1,192 m (3,911 ft)
- Prominence: 46 m (151 ft)
- Coordinates: 44°11.69′N 71°23.29′W

Geography
- Location: Bean's Purchase, Coös County / Hart's Location, Carroll County, New Hampshire, U.S.
- Parent range: Presidential Range
- Topo map: USGS Crawford Notch

Mount Webster is a mountain located on the border between Coos County and Carroll County, New Hampshire, United States. Formerly called Notch Mountain, it is named after Daniel Webster (1782–1852), and is the south-westernmost of the Presidential Range of the White Mountains. Mount Webster is flanked to the northeast by Mount Jackson; to the southwest it faces Mount Willey across Crawford Notch.

The west face of Mount Webster drains directly into the Saco River, thence into the Gulf of Maine at Saco, Maine. The north and southeast faces drain into the Saco via Silver Cascade and Webster Brook respectively.

Mount Webster is on the western boundary of the Presidential Range - Dry River Wilderness. The Appalachian Trail, a 2,170-mile (3,500-km) National Scenic Trail from Georgia to Maine, runs along the ridge of the Presidentials, across the summit of Webster.

== Gallery ==
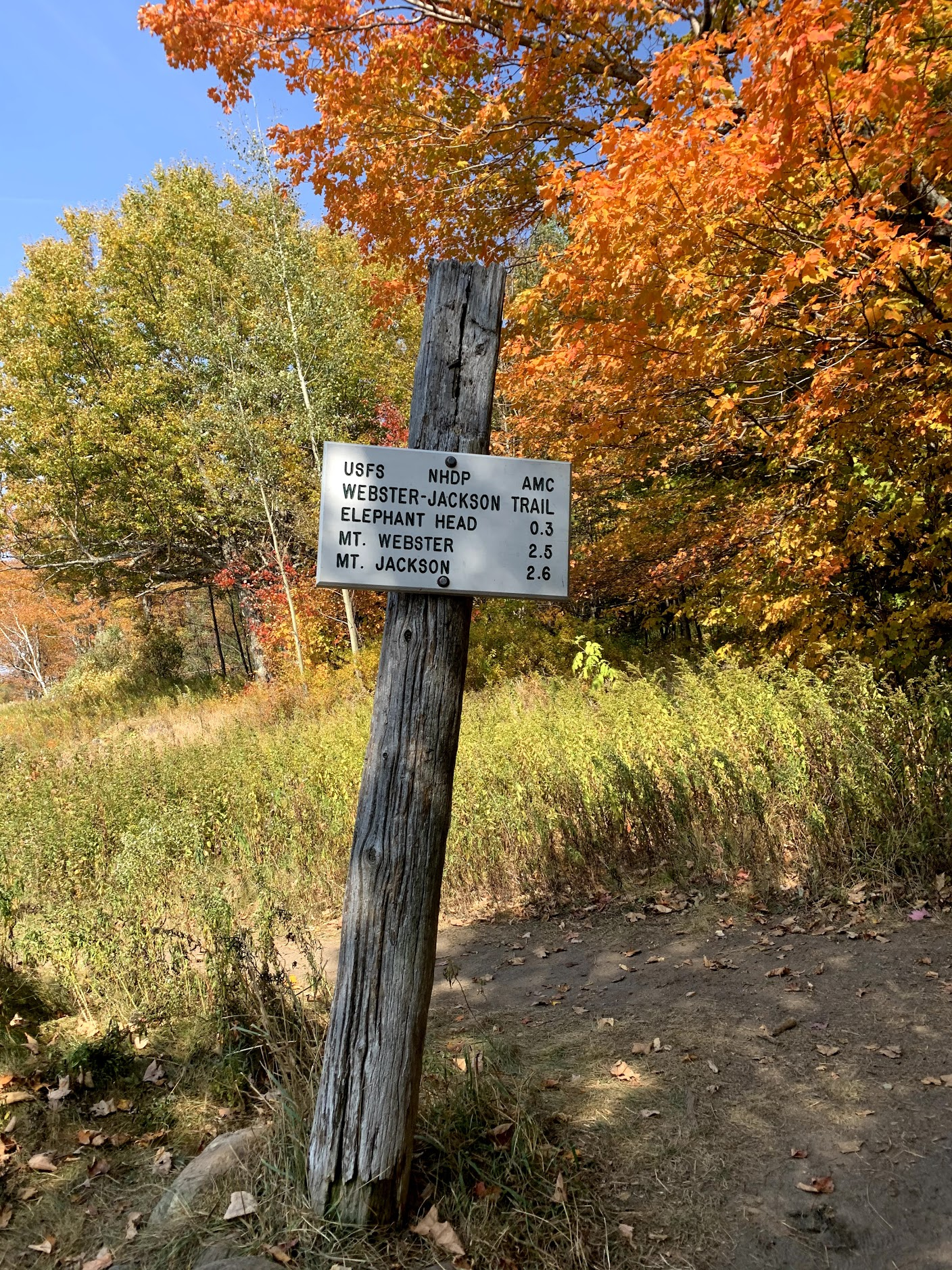
A sign at the start of the Webster-Jackson trail

== See also ==
- List of mountains in New Hampshire
- White Mountain National Forest
