= South Weeks =

Mountain in New Hampshire, United States

Highest point
- Elevation: 1,184 m (3,885 ft)
- Prominence: 105 m (344 ft)
- Listing: #77 New England 100 Highest
- Coordinates: 44°26.54′N 71°23.30′W

Geography
- Location: Coos County, New Hampshire
- Parent range: Pliny Range
- Topo map: USGS Pliny Range

South Weeks, or Mount Weeks-South Peak, is a mountain located in Coos County, New Hampshire, United States, within the western part of the city limits of Berlin. The mountain is named for US Senator John W. Weeks (1860–1926) of nearby Lancaster, New Hampshire, the sponsor of the Weeks Act of 1911, under which the White Mountain National Forest was established. South Weeks is part of the Pliny Range of the White Mountains. South Weeks is flanked to the northeast by Mount Weeks, and to the southwest by Mount Waumbek.

South Weeks stands within the watershed of the upper Connecticut River, which drains into Long Island Sound in Connecticut. The southeast side of the mountain drains by various streams into Keenan Brook, thence into the Upper Ammonoosuc River, a tributary of the Connecticut. The north and west sides of the mountain drain into Garland Brook, thence into Stalbird Brook and the Israel River, another tributary of the Connecticut.

== See also ==
- List of mountains in New Hampshire
- White Mountain National Forest
- New England Hundred Highest
