= Mount Field (New Hampshire) =

Mountain in the state of New Hampshire

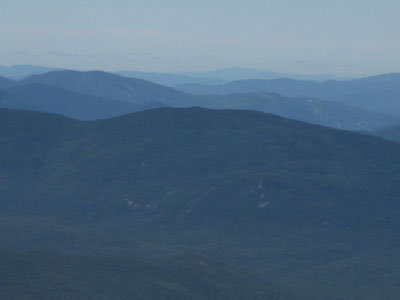
- Mount Field as seen from below the summit of Mount Jefferson

Highest point
- Elevation: 4,327 feet (1,319 m)
- Prominence: 1,681 ft (512 m)
- Listing: White Mountain 4000-Footers
- Coordinates: 44°11′46″N 71°26′04″W

Geography
- Location: Grafton County, New Hampshire, U.S.
- Parent range: White Mountains, Willey Range
- Topo map: USGS Crawford Notch (NH)

Mount Field is a mountain located in Grafton County, New Hampshire. The mountain is named after Darby Field (1610–1649), who in 1642 made the first known ascent of Mount Washington. Mount Field is the highest peak of the Willey Range of the White Mountains. Mt. Field is flanked to the northwest by Mount Tom, and to the southwest by Mount Willey.

Mt. Field stands on the borders of three watersheds. On its northeast side, it drains into the Saco River, and thence into the Gulf of Maine in Maine. On the south side, it drains into the North Fork Pemigewasset River, and thence into the East Branch, Pemigewasset River, and Merrimack River, which reaches the sea in Massachusetts. On the west side, Field drains into the Zealand River, and thence into the Ammonoosuc River, Connecticut River, and into Long Island Sound in Connecticut.

== See also ==
- List of mountains in New Hampshire
- White Mountain National Forest
