= Mount Jackson (New Hampshire) =

Mountain in New Hampshire, U.S.

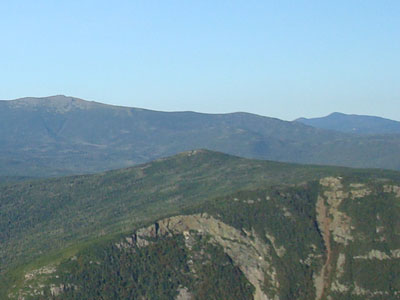
- Mount Jackson (center) as seen from Mount Willey

Highest point
- Elevation: 4,052 ft (1,235 m)
- Prominence: 332 ft (101 m)
- Listing: White Mountain 4000-Footers
- Coordinates: 44°11′40″N 71°23′19″W

Geography
- Location: Bean's Purchase, Coös County, New Hampshire, U.S.
- Parent range: Presidential Range
- Topo map: USGS Crawford Notch

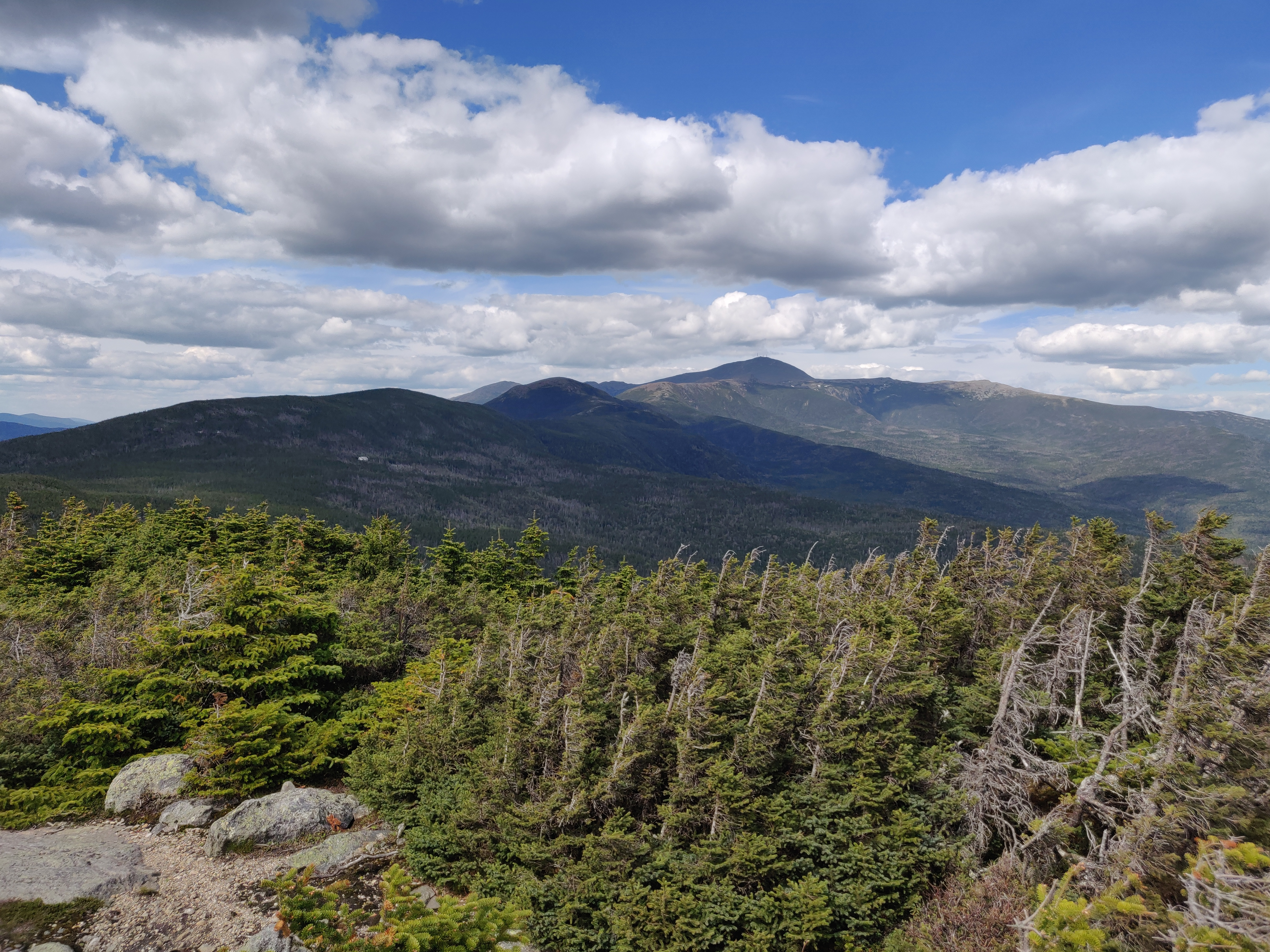
View from the summit (view as a 360° interactive panorama)

Mount Jackson is a mountain located in Coos County, New Hampshire. The mountain is named after Charles Thomas Jackson, New Hampshire's state geologist in the 19th century, and is part of the Presidential Range of the White Mountains. Mount Jackson is flanked to the north by Mount Pierce, and to the southwest by Mount Webster.

The Appalachian Trail, a 2,170-mile (3,500-km) National Scenic Trail from Georgia to Maine, crosses the summit of Mount Jackson as it traverses the main ridge of the Presidentials from Crawford Notch to the summit of Mount Washington. Jackson stands on the west side of the Presidential – Dry River Wilderness.

== See also ==
- List of mountains in New Hampshire
- White Mountain National Forest
