= Mount Pierce (New Hampshire) =

Mountain in New Hampshire, U.S.

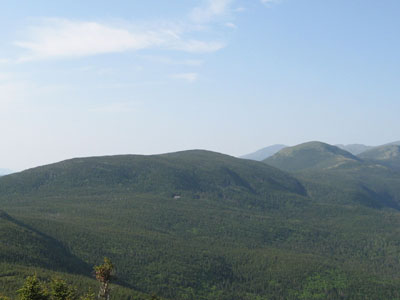
- Mount Pierce as seen from Mount Jackson

Highest point
- Elevation: 4,310 ft (1,310 m)
- Prominence: 230 ft (70 m)
- Listing: New England 4000-foot Peaks
- Coordinates: 44°13′35″N 71°21′58″W

Geography
- Location: White Mountain National Forest, Bean's Grant, Coos County, New Hampshire, U.S.
- Parent range: Presidential Range
- Topo map: USGS Stairs Mountain

Climbing
- Easiest route: Hike (Crawford Path)

Mount Pierce is a mountain in the Presidential Range in the White Mountains of New Hampshire that is approximately 4,310 feet (1,310 m) high. Formerly called Mount Clinton for 19th-century governor DeWitt Clinton of New York, in 1913 it was renamed after President Franklin Pierce (1804–1869), the only president born in New Hampshire, although it was several decades before the name was widely recognized. Its summit offers a wide view of New Hampshire's mountains.

The shortest trail route to the summit of Pierce is from a parking lot to the west of the mountain on Mount Clinton Road just off Route 302. The trail primarily follows the Crawford Path, the oldest continually used hiking trail in the United States. Crawford Path was established in 1819 by Abel and Ethan Crawford, who referred to the mountain as Bald Mountain. The Appalachian Trail and Webster Cliff Trail approach from Mount Jackson in the south and meet Crawford Path just north of the summit before continuing to the northeast. Mount Eisenhower and Mount Monroe lie on the ridge northeast of Mount Pierce. All three of these peaks are included on the peak-bagging list of four-thousand footers in New Hampshire.
