= Mendon Peak (Vermont) =

Mountain in Vermont, United States

- Location within Vermont

Highest point
- Elevation: 3,840 ft (1,170 m)
- Prominence: 280 ft (85 m)
- Listing: #85 New England 100 Highest
- Coordinates: 43°35′42″N 72°50′46″W

Geography
- Location: Rutland County, Vermont, U.S.
- Parent range: Green Mountains
- Topo map: USGS Killington Peak

Climbing
- Easiest route: Logging road, bushwhack

Mendon Peak is a mountain located in Rutland County, Vermont. The mountain is a spur off the west side of the Coolidge Range of the Green Mountains, and stands within the Calvin Coolidge State Forest. It is flanked to the east by Little Killington. Mendon Peak is on the Appalachian Mountain Club's list of the "Hundred Highest" peaks in New England. The summit is trailless and several different approaches are possible.

Mendon Peak stands within the watershed of the Cold River, a tributary of Otter Creek, which drains into Lake Champlain, and thence into the Richelieu River in Québec, the Saint Lawrence River, and into the Gulf of Saint Lawrence. The north side of Mendon drains into Eddy Brook, and thence into the North Branch of the Cold River. The south side of Mendon drains via a stream into Sargent Brook, thence into Gould Brook and the Cold River.

== See also ==
- List of mountains in Vermont
- New England Hundred Highest
