= Mount Tom (New Hampshire) =

Mountain in New Hampshire, United States

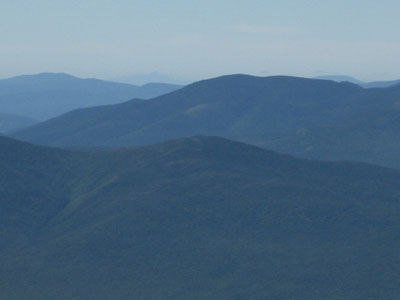
- Mt. Tom (lower center) as seen from Mt. Jefferson

Highest point
- Elevation: 4,051 ft (1,235 m)
- Prominence: 331 ft (101 m)
- Listing: White Mountain 4000-Footers
- Coordinates: 44°12′37″N 71°26′45″W

Geography
- Location: Grafton County, New Hampshire, U.S.
- Parent range: Willey Range
- Topo map: USGS Crawford Notch

Climbing
- Easiest route: Hike Avalon Trail to A-Z Trail to Mt. Tom Spur

Mount Tom is a mountain located in Grafton County, New Hampshire, about 1.5 miles (2.4 km) southwest of the height of land of Crawford Notch.

The mountain is named after Thomas Crawford, whose family ran three inns in Crawford Notch in the first half of the nineteenth century. Mount Tom is part of the Willey Range of the White Mountains. Tom is flanked to the south by Mount Field. Mt. Tom is drained on the east by Crawford Brook and on the west by the Zealand River. Both are tributaries of the Ammonoosuc River, which drains into the Connecticut and thence into Long Island Sound.

From 1829 until about 1850, Tom Crawford was the innkeeper at the Notch House, which was located at the top of the Notch. Around 1850, Tom Crawford started to build a larger hotel and ran into financial difficulty. Forced to sell out, he left the Notch at that time. The hotel he started became the Crawford House.

An alpine ski area associated with Tom Corcoran and the Crawford House was proposed for the northern slope of the mountain in the early 1970s.

== See also ==
- List of mountains in New Hampshire
- White Mountain National Forest
