= Four-thousand footers =

Mountains in New England over 4000 feet

The Four-thousand footers (sometimes abbreviated 4ks) are a group of 48 summits in New Hampshire's White Mountains that are at least 4,000 feet (1,200 m) above sea level. To qualify for inclusion a peak must also meet the more technical criterion of topographic prominence important in the mountaineering sport of peak-bagging.

The White Mountains Four Thousand Footers List was established by the Appalachian Mountain Club (AMC) in 1957. The AMC calls it the White Mountains List, but others call it the New Hampshire List because it does not include Old Speck Mountain (4,170 ft) in Maine, which is outside the White Mountain National Forest but within the White Mountains.

The AMC has also maintained a list of New England 4000 Footers, all falling within Vermont, New Hampshire, and Maine, since 1964. Other lists of 4000-footers not maintained by the AMC include the original set of 4,000-foot mountains for peak-bagging: the 46 High Peaks in the Adirondacks.

The AMC has revised its 4000-footer lists as surveying became more accurate or the selection criteria were adjusted, with the White Mountains list growing from 46 peaks in the 1950s to 48 in 1982. The proper inclusion or exclusion of several peaks is still a matter of some dispute.

The 48 lie in the White Mountain National Forest, within two northern counties of New Hampshire: Coos and Grafton. All these peaks are on land owned by the Forest Service, except those of Cannon Mountain and Mount Washington which are situated in state parks,, and Mount Moosilauke which is owned by Dartmouth College.

== Prominence ==
A topographic prominence criterion is applied to exclude high points which are considered subsidiary peaks of a larger mountain. The definition of topographic prominence is the vertical separation between a peak and the low point of the highest ridge connecting it to a higher one. In practical terms, prominence is the minimum distance a hiker must descend before ascending a higher peak.

The AMC's 4000-Footer lists require that a mountain rise 200 feet (61 m) beyond a ridge connecting it to its neighbor. Earlier versions required either 300 feet (91 m) of prominence or one-quarter mile (0.40 km) of separation.

== Four Thousand Footer club ==
A committee of the AMC sets the criteria and collects information verifying that peaks meet them. It also maintains a list of the Four Thousand Footer Club's self-declared members, who request recognition for having ascended on foot all of the 48. The first of these was compiled in 1958.

There are numerous variations in completing the Four Thousand Footer list. For example, the AMC maintains a roster of those making ascents between the winter solstice and spring equinox. Another not officially recorded is reaching each summit twelve times, once in each of the twelve months, in any calendar order. This is known as The Grid. As of September 2016, the feat has been claimed by 68 individuals.

== The New Hampshire list ==
New Hampshire Four Thousand Footers are listed below in descending order of their elevations. Some of these names do not appear on maps, and some alternative names are indicated below.

1. Washington: 6,288 ft (1,917 m) AT*
2. Adams: 5,774 ft (1,760 m) AT**
3. Jefferson: 5,712 ft (1,741 m) AT**
4. Monroe: 5,384 ft (1,641 m) AT**
5. Madison: 5,367 ft (1,636 m) AT*
6. Lafayette: 5,249 ft (1,600 m) AT*
7. Lincoln: 5,089 ft (1,551 m) AT*
8. South Twin: 4,902 ft (1,494 m) AT*
9. Carter Dome: 4,832 ft (1,473 m) AT*
10. Moosilauke: 4,802 ft (1,464 m) AT*
11. Eisenhower: 4,780 ft (1,460 m) AT**
12. North Twin: 4,761 ft (1,451 m)
13. Carrigain: 4,700 ft (1,400 m)
14. Bond: 4,698 ft (1,432 m)
15. Middle Carter: 4,610 ft (1,410 m) AT*
16. West Bond: 4,540 ft (1,380 m)
17. Garfield: 4,500 ft (1,400 m) AT**
18. Liberty: 4,459 ft (1,359 m) AT**
19. South Carter: 4,430 ft (1,350 m) AT*
20. Wildcat: 4,422 ft (1,348 m) AT*
21. Hancock: 4,420 ft (1,350 m)
22. South Kinsman: 4,358 ft (1,328 m) ("South Peak") AT*
23. Field: 4,340 ft (1,320 m)
24. Osceola: 4,340 ft (1,320 m)
25. Flume: 4,328 ft (1,319 m)
26. South Hancock: 4,319 ft (1,316 m)
27. Pierce: 4,310 ft (1,310 m) AT*
28. North Kinsman: 4,293 ft (1,309 m) ("North Peak") AT*
29. Willey: 4,285 ft (1,306 m)
30. Bondcliff: 4,265 ft (1,300 m) ("The Cliffs")
31. Zealand: 4,260 ft (1,300 m) ("Zealand Ridge") AT**
32. North Tripyramid: 4180 ft ("North Peak")
33. Cabot: 4,170 ft (1,270 m)
34. East Osceola: 4,156 ft (1,267 m) ("East Peak")
35. Middle Tripyramid: 4,140 ft (1,260 m)
36. Cannon: 4,100 ft (1,200 m)
37. Wildcat D: 4,070 ft (1,240 m) ("Wildcat Ridge") AT*
38. Hale: 4,054 ft (1,236 m)
39. Jackson: 4,052 ft (1,235 m) AT*
40. Tom: 4,051 ft (1,235 m)
41. Moriah: 4,049 ft (1,234 m) AT**
42. Passaconaway: 4,043 ft (1,232 m)
43. Owl's Head: 4,025 ft (1,227 m)
44. Galehead: 4,024 ft (1,227 m) AT**
45. Whiteface: 4,020 ft (1,230 m)
46. Waumbek: 4,006 ft (1,221 m)
47. Isolation: 4,004 ft (1,220 m)
48. Tecumseh: Traditionally 4,003 ft (1,220 m), resurveyed July 2019 3,997 ft (1,218 m)

AT* = Appalachian Trail passes over summit; AT** = AT passes near summit

== The New England list ==
This list consists of the New Hampshire list, plus the following:

4000-Footers in Maine:

1. Katahdin (Baxter Peak): 5,268 ft (1,606 m) AT* (northern terminus)
2. Katahdin (Hamlin Peak): 4,756 ft (1,450 m)
3. Sugarloaf Mountain: 4,250 ft (1,300 m) AT**
4. Crocker Mountain: 4,228 ft (1,289 m) AT*
5. Old Speck: 4,170 ft (1,270 m) AT**
6. Mount Bigelow (West Peak): 4,145 ft (1,263 m) AT*
7. North Brother: 4,151 ft (1,265 m)
8. Saddleback Mountain : 4,120 ft (1,260 m) AT*
9. Mount Bigelow (Avery Peak): 4,090 ft (1,250 m) AT*
10. Mount Abraham: 4,050 ft (1,230 m)
11. South Crocker Mountain: 4,050 ft (1,230 m) AT*
12. Saddleback Mountain (the Horn): 4,041 ft (1,232 m) AT*
13. Mount Redington: 4,010 ft (1,220 m)
14. Spaulding Mountain: 4,010 ft (1,220 m) AT**

4000-Footers in Vermont:

1. Mount Mansfield: 4,393 ft (1,339 m) LT*
2. Killington Peak: 4,235 ft (1,291 m) AT** LT**
3. Camel's Hump: 4,083 ft (1,244 m) LT*
4. Mount Ellen: 4,083 ft (1,244 m) LT*
5. Mount Abraham: 4,006 ft (1,221 m) LT*

LT* = Long Trail passes over summit; LT** = LT passes near summit

== See also ==
- Adirondack High Peaks (Adirondack Forty-sixers)
- List of New England Fifty Finest
- List of New England Hundred Highest
- List of Quebec 1000 meter peaks
- Northeast 111 4000-footers
