= Mount Bond =

Mountain in New Hampshire, USA

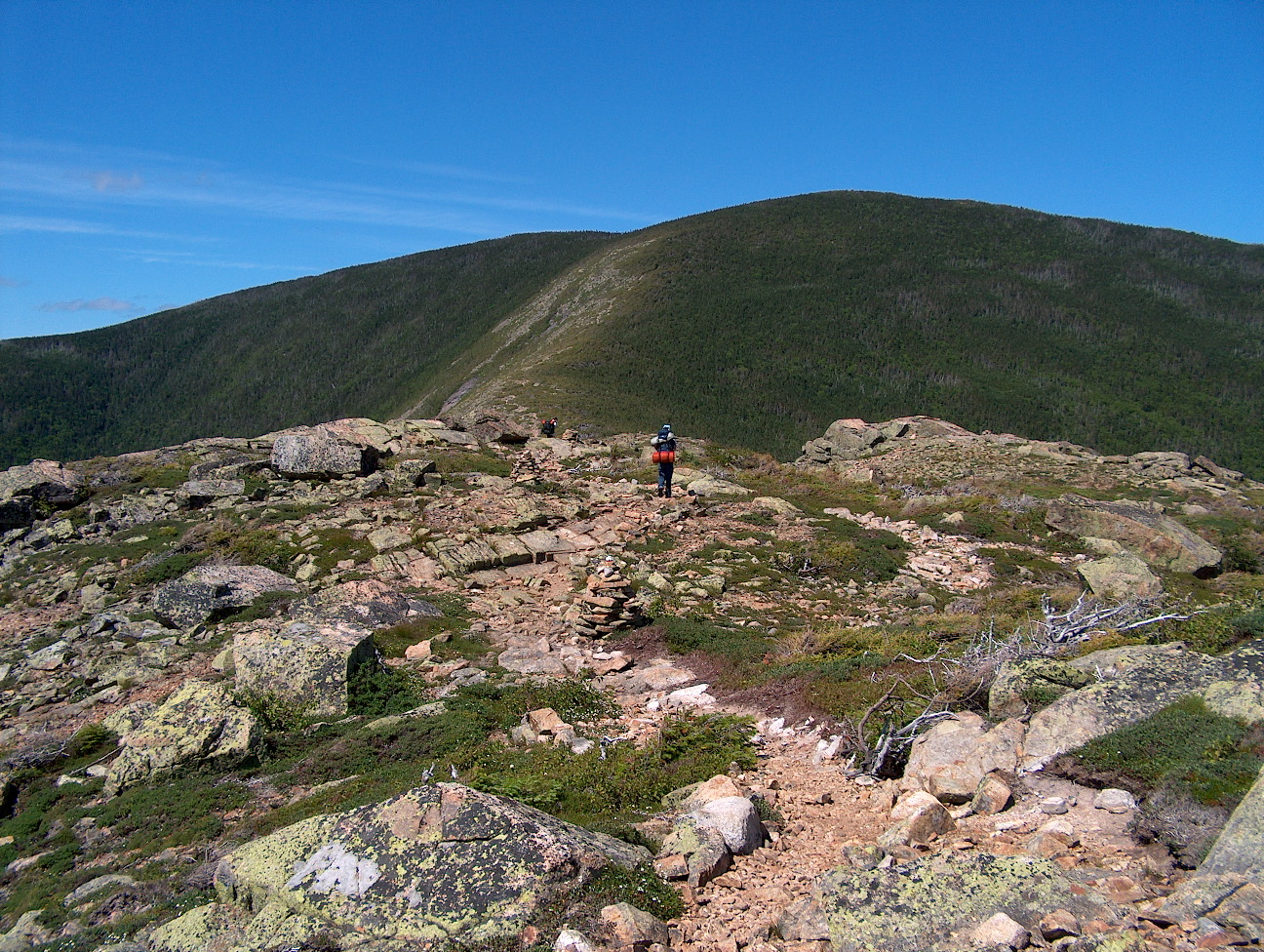
- Mount Bond from the Bondcliff ridge

Highest point
- Elevation: 4,698 ft (1,432 m)
- Prominence: 298 ft (91 m)
- Listing: White Mountain 4000-Footers
- Coordinates: 44°09′11″N 71°31′52″W

Geography
- Location: Lincoln, New Hampshire, U.S.
- Parent range: Twin Range
- Topo map: USGS South Twin Mountain

West Bond
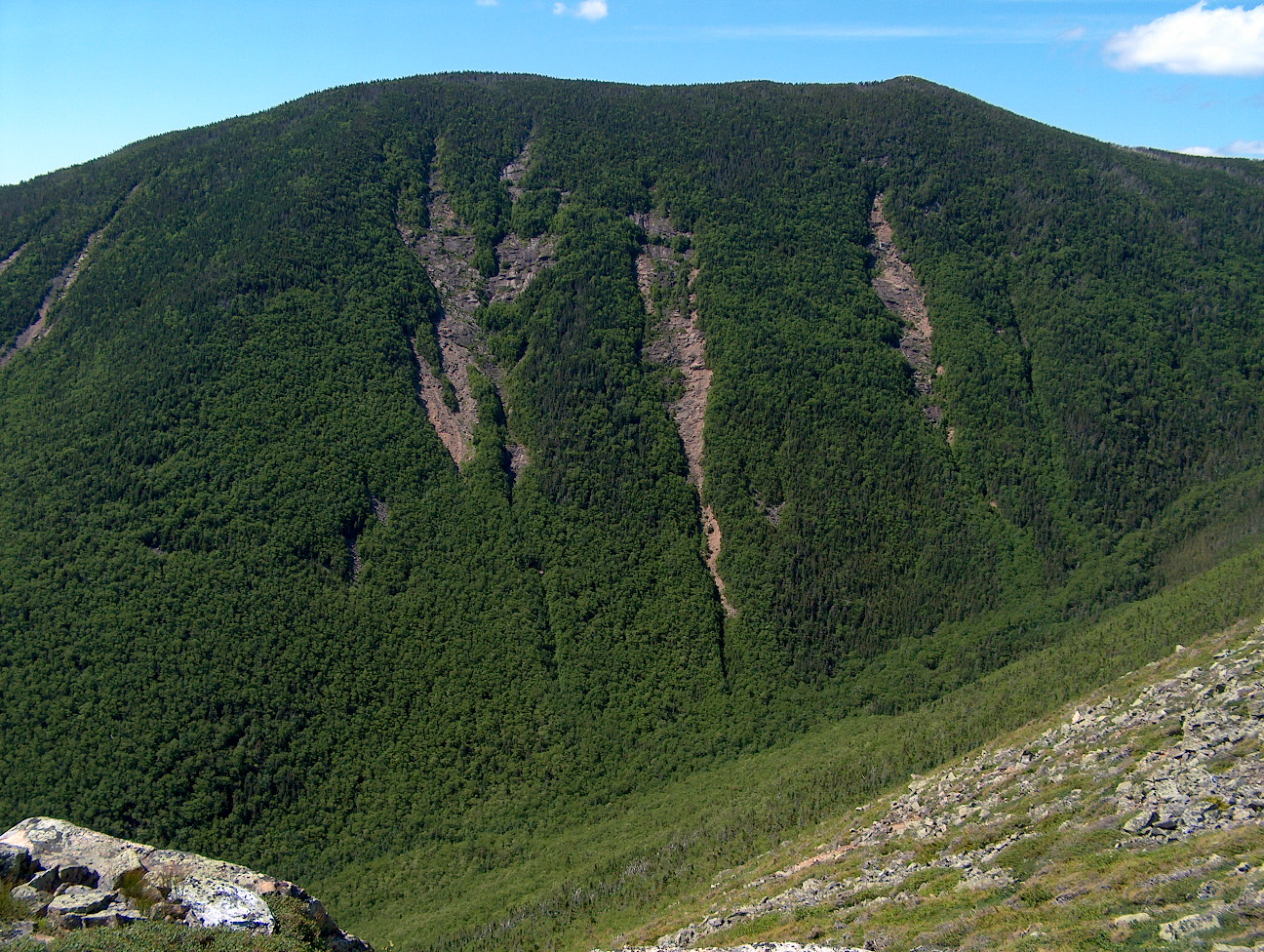

Highest point
- Elevation: 4520+ ft (1378+ m)
- Prominence: 200 ft (61 m)
- Listing: White Mountain 4000-Footers
- Coordinates: 44°09′17″N 71°32′37″W

Geography
- Location: New Hampshire, U.S.

Bondcliff
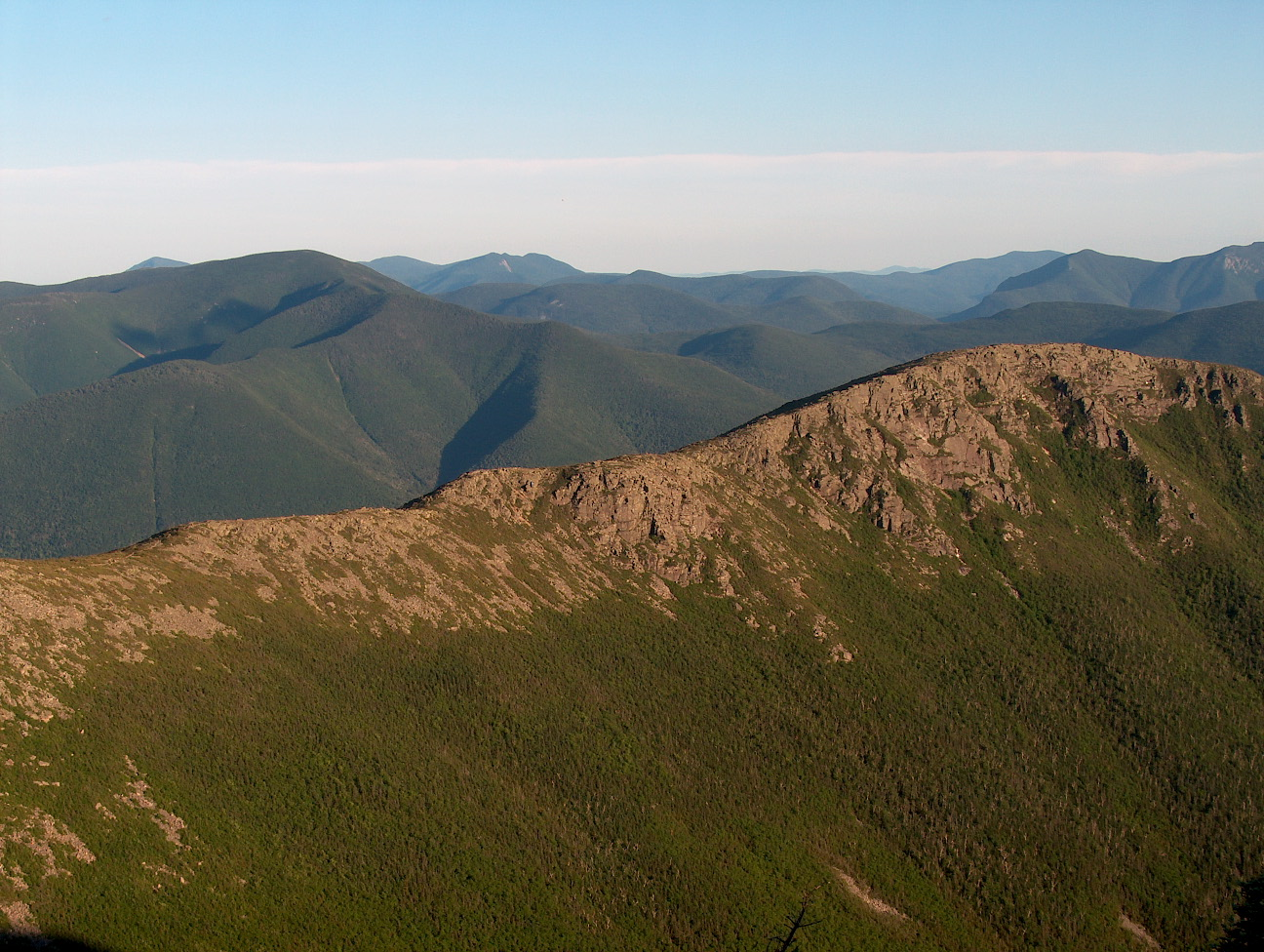
- Bondcliff at sunset

Highest point
- Elevation: 4,265 ft (1,300 m)
- Prominence: 205 ft (62 m)
- Listing: White Mountain 4000-Footers
- Coordinates: 44°08′26″N 71°32′26″W

Geography
- Location: New Hampshire, U.S.

Mount Bond is a mountain located in Grafton County, New Hampshire, United States. The mountain is named after Professor George P. Bond (1825–1865) of Harvard University, and is the southernmost extension of the Twin Range of the White Mountains. Mount Bond is flanked to the north by Mount Guyot.

Mount Bond has two subsidiary peaks, West Bond and Bondcliff (or "The Cliffs"). All three peaks are included on the Appalachian Mountain Club's list of "four-thousand footers".

Mount Bond is located within the Pemigewasset Wilderness Area. It drains to the east and west into the North Fork and Franconia Branch respectively of the East Branch of the Pemigewasset River, thence into the Pemigewasset and Merrimack Rivers, and into the Gulf of Maine in Massachusetts.

== See also ==
- List of mountains in New Hampshire
- White Mountain National Forest
