= Hamlin Peak =

Mountain in Maine, United States

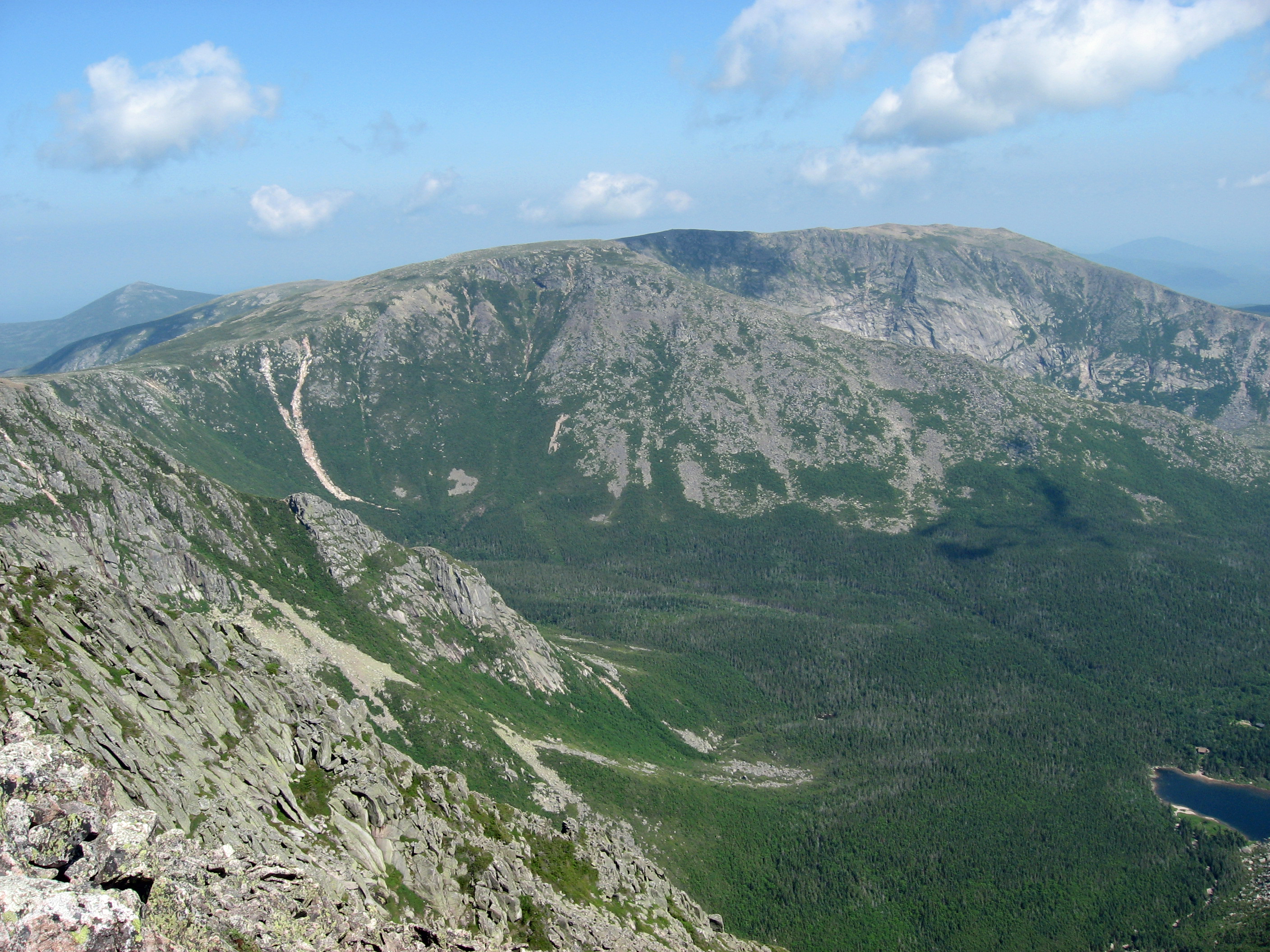

Highest point
- Elevation: 4,756 ft (1,450 m)
- Prominence: 496 ft (151 m)
- Listing: New England 4000 footers
- Coordinates: 45°55′16″N 68°55′24″W

Naming
- Etymology: Hannibal Hamlin

Geography
- Location within Maine
- Location: Piscataquis County, Maine, U.S.
- Topo map: USGS Mount Katahdin

Climbing
- Easiest route: Hike

Hamlin Peak is a 4,756-foot (1,450 m) mountain located in Baxter State Park in Piscataquis County, Maine. Hamlin Peak is a northern spur of the greater Mount Katahdin massif and is flanked to the south by Baxter Peak, and to the north by the Howe Peaks. Since it rises nearly 500 feet (150 m) above the col joining it to the higher Baxter Peak, Hamlin Peak qualifies as a four-thousand footer based on the topographic prominence criterion used by the Appalachian Mountain Club, and is ranked as the second-highest peak in Maine.

The southeast face of Hamlin Peak drains into the Great Basin, where water ultimately flows into the Penobscot River and eventually empties into the Atlantic Ocean at Penobscot Bay.

There are several trails that lead to or near the summit of Hamlin Peak.

== Gallery ==
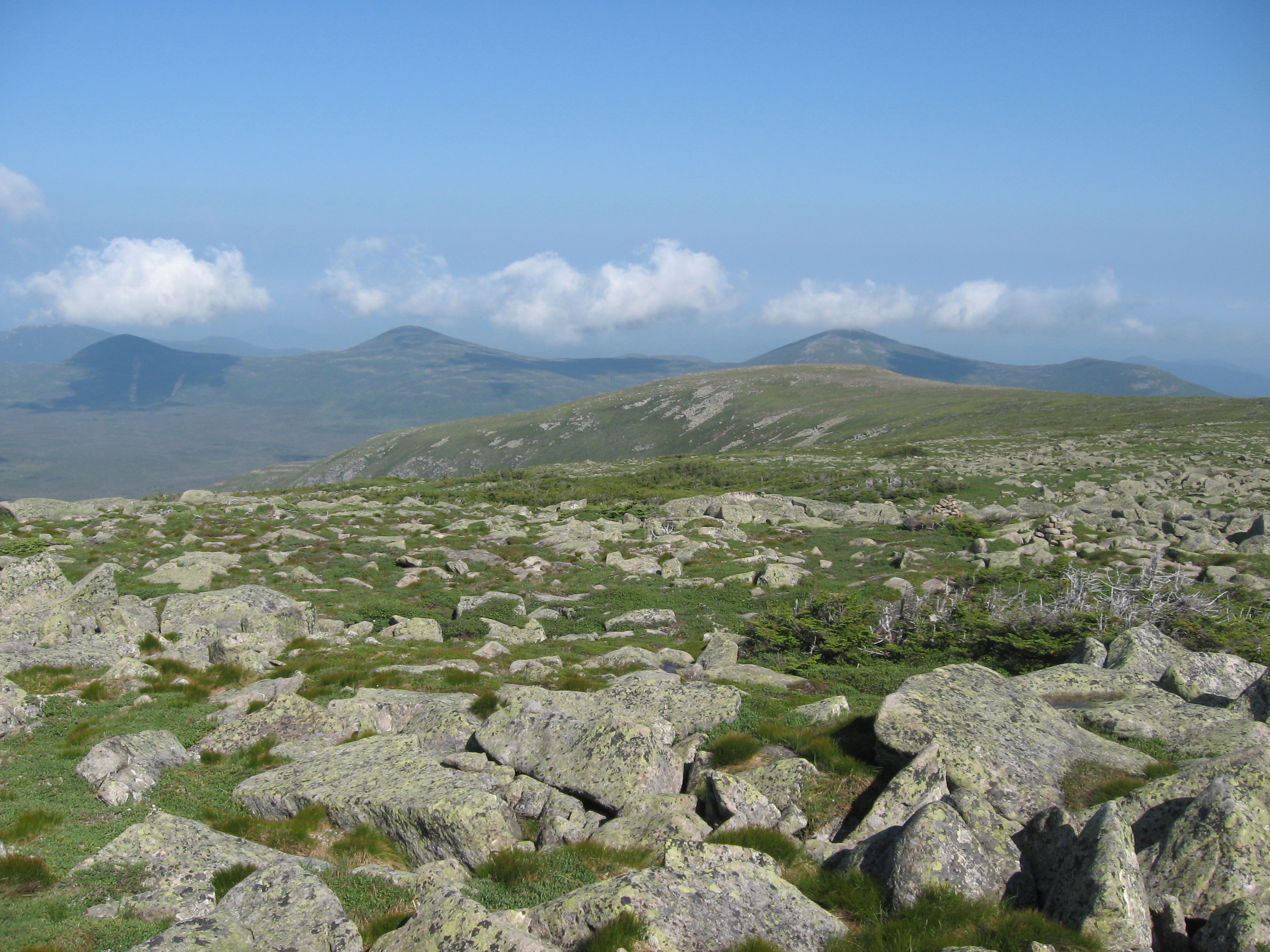
Northwest from Hamlin Peak

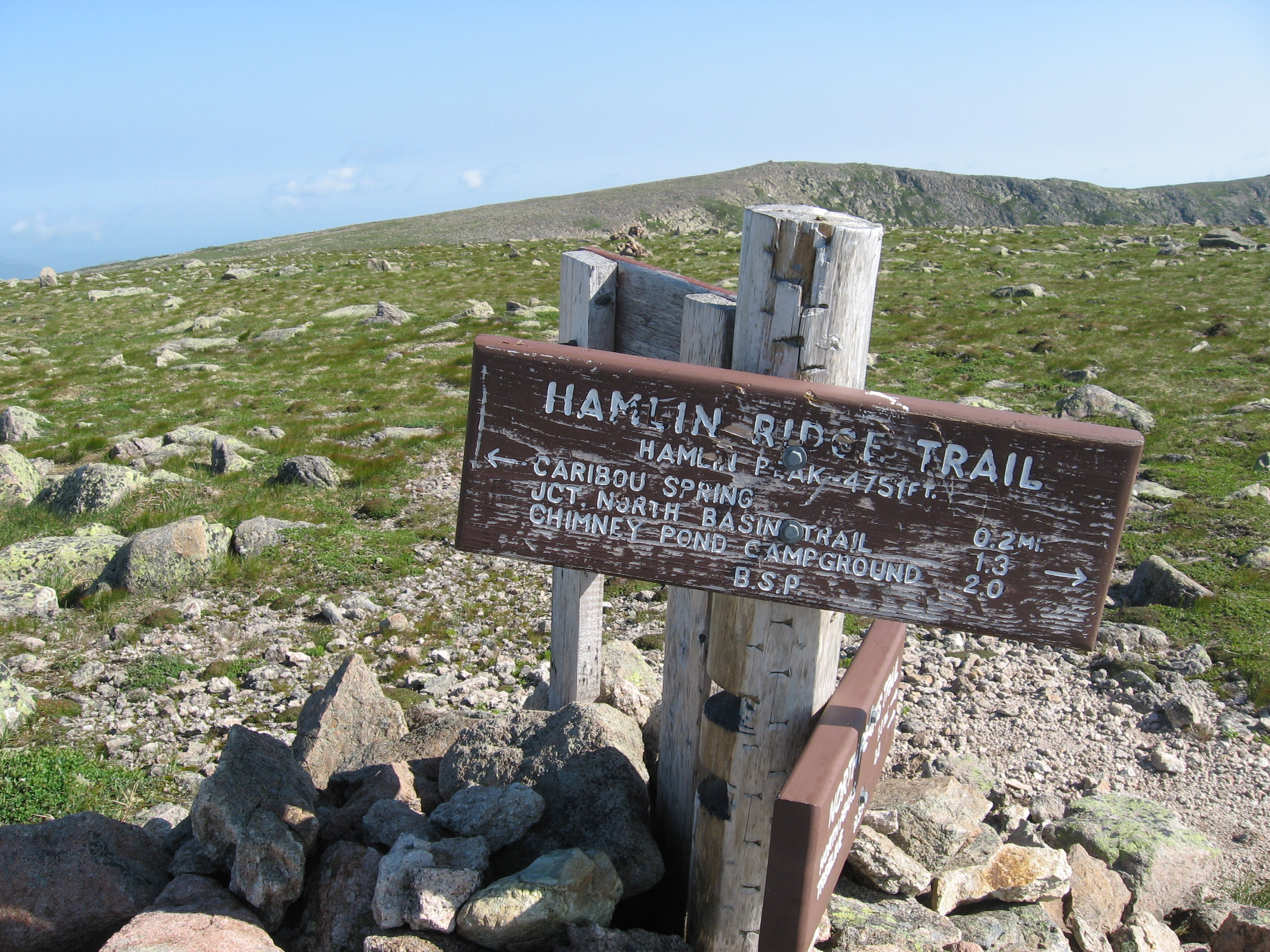
Hamlin Peak

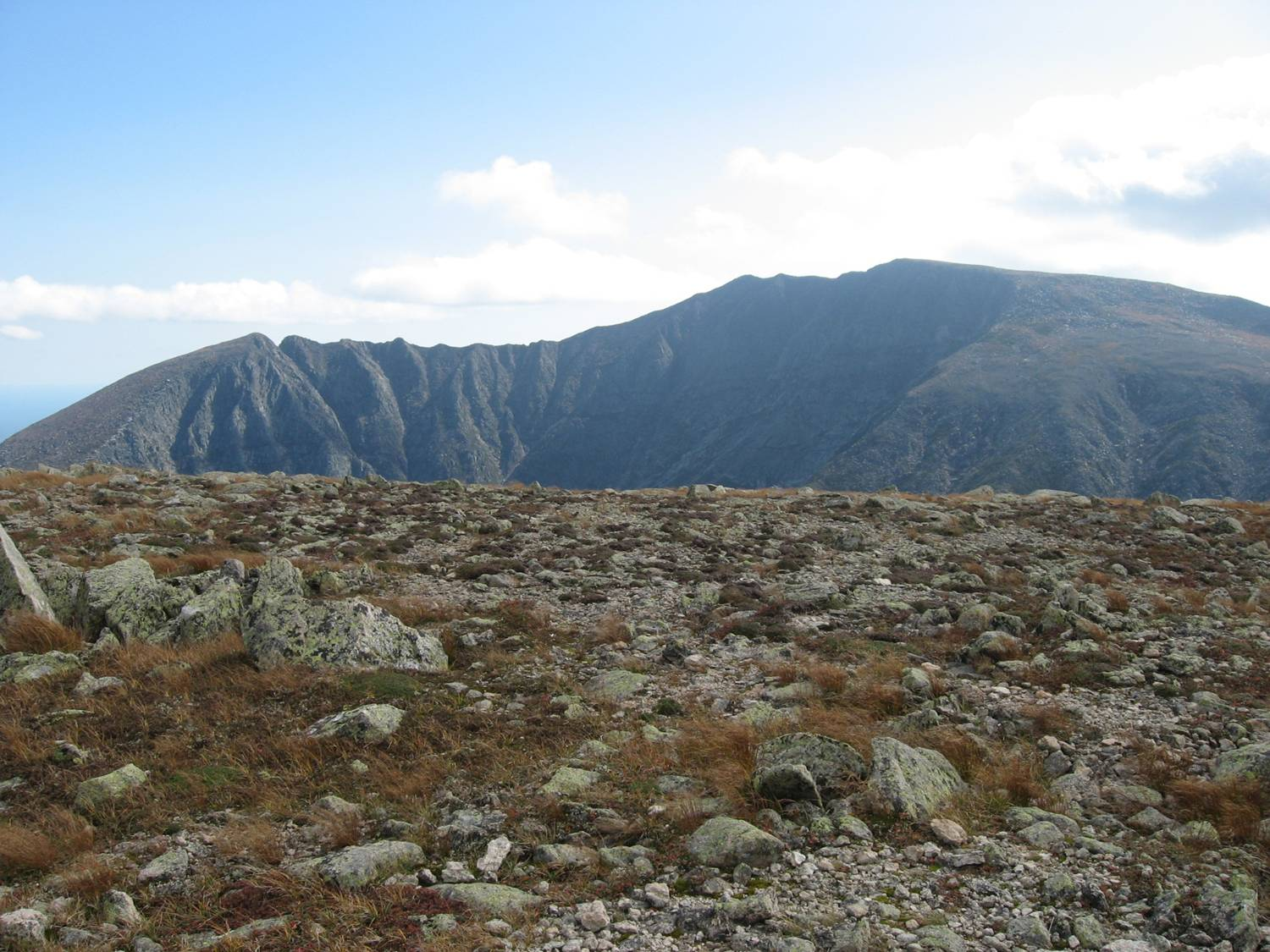
Baxter Peak from Hamlin Peak

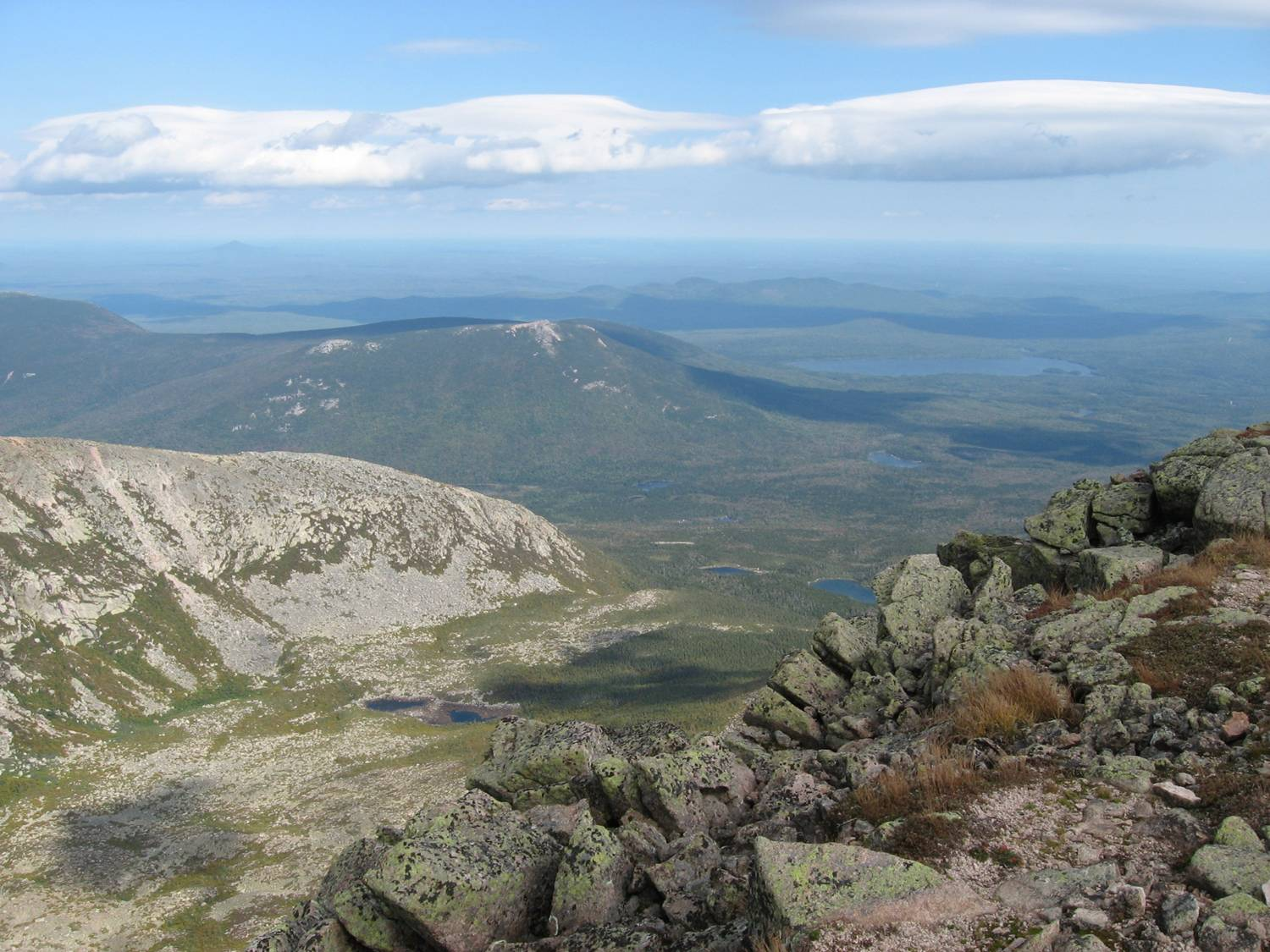
North Basin from Hamlin Peak

== See also ==
- List of mountains in Maine
