= Mount Hancock (New Hampshire) =

Mountain in New Hampshire, United States

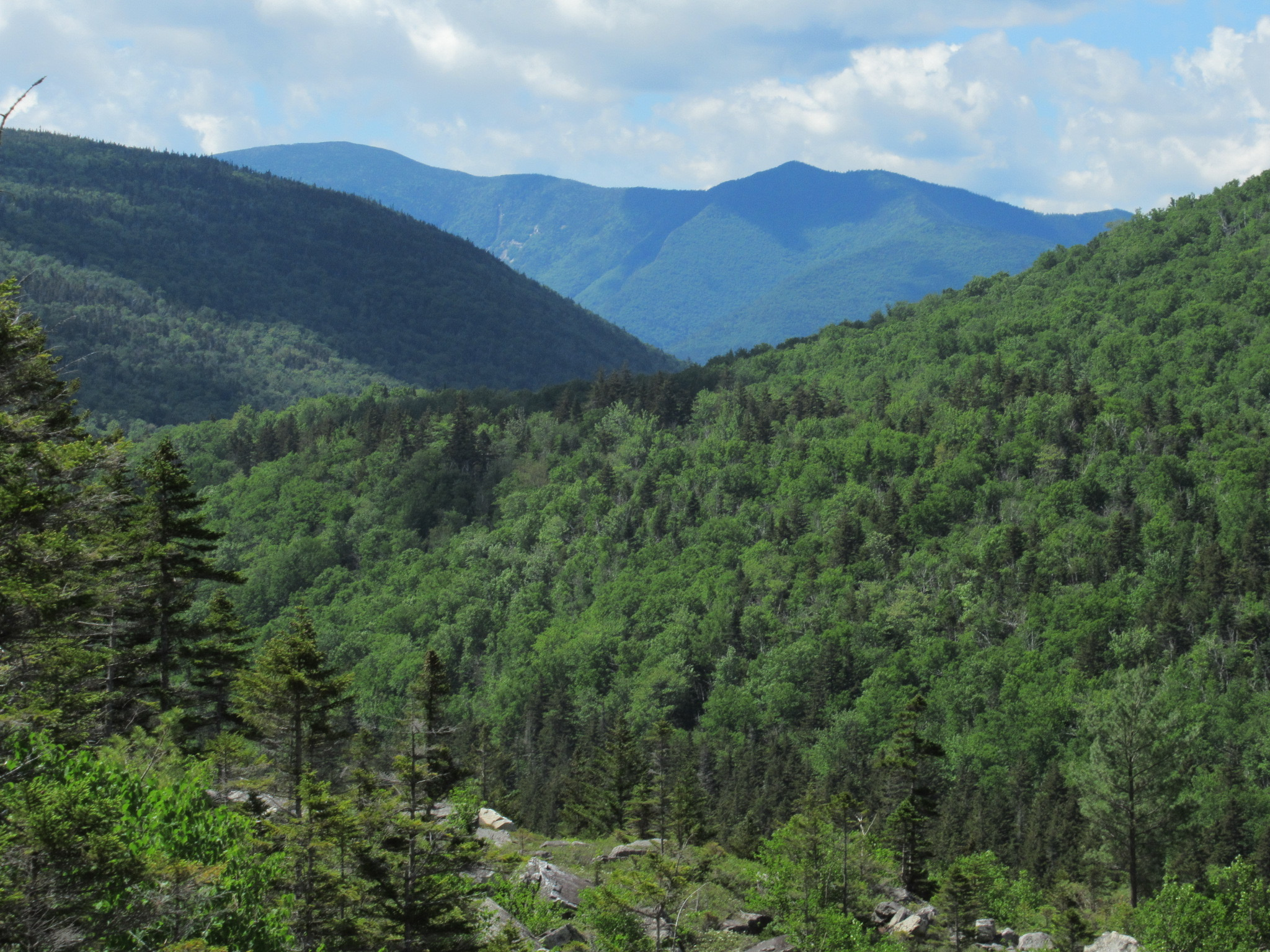
- Mt. Hancock viewed from Zealand Notch

Highest point
- Elevation: 4,403 feet (1,342 m)
- Prominence: 1,200 ft (370 m)
- Listing: White Mountain 4000-footers
- Coordinates: 44°05′01″N 71°29′37″W

Geography
- Location: Grafton County, New Hampshire, U.S.
- Parent range: White Mountains
- Topo map: USGS Mount Carrigain

South Hancock

Highest point
- Elevation: 4,257 ft (1,298 m) NGVD 29
- Prominence: 179 ft (55 m)
- Listing: White Mountain 4000-footers
- Coordinates: 44°04′24″N 71°29′14″W

Mount Hancock is a mountain in Grafton County, New Hampshire, named after John Hancock (1737–1793), one of the Founding Fathers of the United States.

The mountain is on the south side of the Pemigewasset Wilderness, the source of the Pemigewasset River in the heart of the White Mountains, between Franconia Notch and Crawford Notch. Mount Hancock is flanked to the northeast by Mount Carrigain, to the south by Mount Huntington, and to the west by Mount Hitchcock. Prior to the completion of the Kancamagus Highway, Mount Hancock was one of the most remote, inaccessible peaks in the White Mountains.

The Appalachian Mountain Club considers both Mount Hancock and the officially unnamed peak to its south to be "four-thousand footers", because it was previously believed that the south peak had a prominence more than 200 feet (61 m) above the col that adjoins it to the higher north peak. However, the most recent lidar data shows a prominence of only 179 feet (55 m).

== See also ==
- List of mountains in New Hampshire
- Four-thousand footers
- White Mountain National Forest
