= Pemigewasset Wilderness =

Wilderness in the state of New Hampshire

Pemigewasset Wilderness Area
- IUCN category Ib (wilderness area)
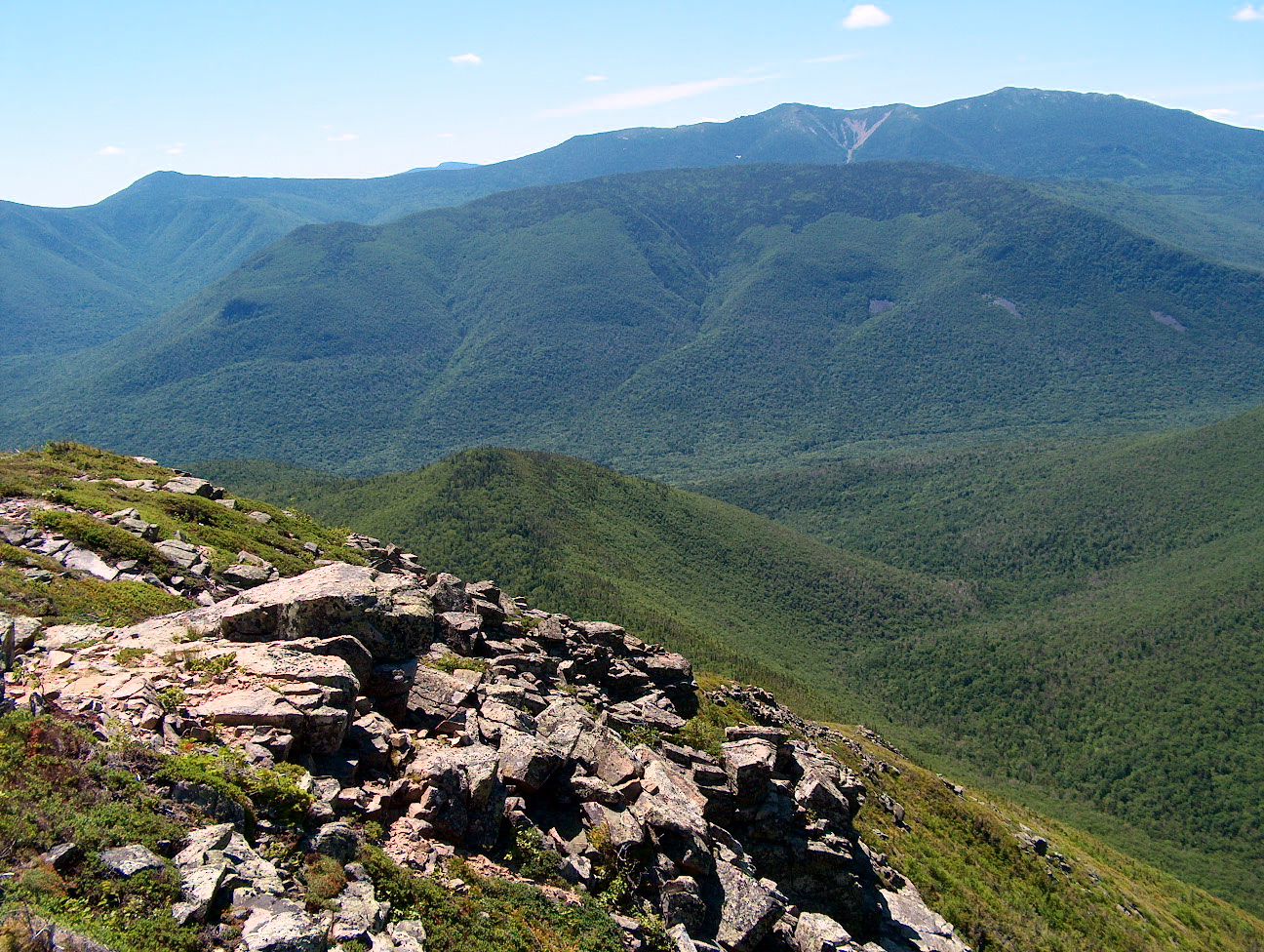
- Looking west from Bondcliff across Owl's Head to Franconia Ridge

- Location within the United States
- Location: Grafton County, New Hampshire, USA
- Nearest city: Lincoln, New Hampshire
- Coordinates: 44°06′45″N 71°31′36″W
- Area: 45,000 acres (182 km^{2})
- Established: 1984
- Governing body: United States Forest Service

The Pemigewasset Wilderness is a 45,000-acre (182 km^{2}) federally designated Wilderness Area in the heart of New Hampshire's White Mountains. It is a part of the White Mountain National Forest. It is New Hampshire's largest wilderness area.

The Wilderness Area consists of the upper watershed of the East Branch of the Pemigewasset River, and includes the Franconia, Twin, Zealand, and Hancock mountain ranges, but excludes the summits of the ranges and the trail along them. As a result of the region's rugged character, the Pemigewasset Wilderness is a popular recreation area; its large trail network receives heavy use, in the form of hiking, cross-country skiing, and others, throughout the year.

The area is also noted for its ecological recovery from the logging era of the late nineteenth and early twentieth centuries. After years of unchecked clear-cutting, during which the zone had the largest logging railroad system in the White Mountains, the area's inclusion in the White Mountain National Forest and later designation as a Wilderness Area has led to a substantial rebound in the forest ecosystem.

== Geography ==
The Pemigewasset Wilderness consists of two horseshoe-shaped "lobes" characterized by relatively low, wet river valleys surrounded by high mountain ridges. The East Branch of the Pemigewasset River, for which the wilderness is named, flows from northeast to southwest through the valley.

=== Western lobe ===
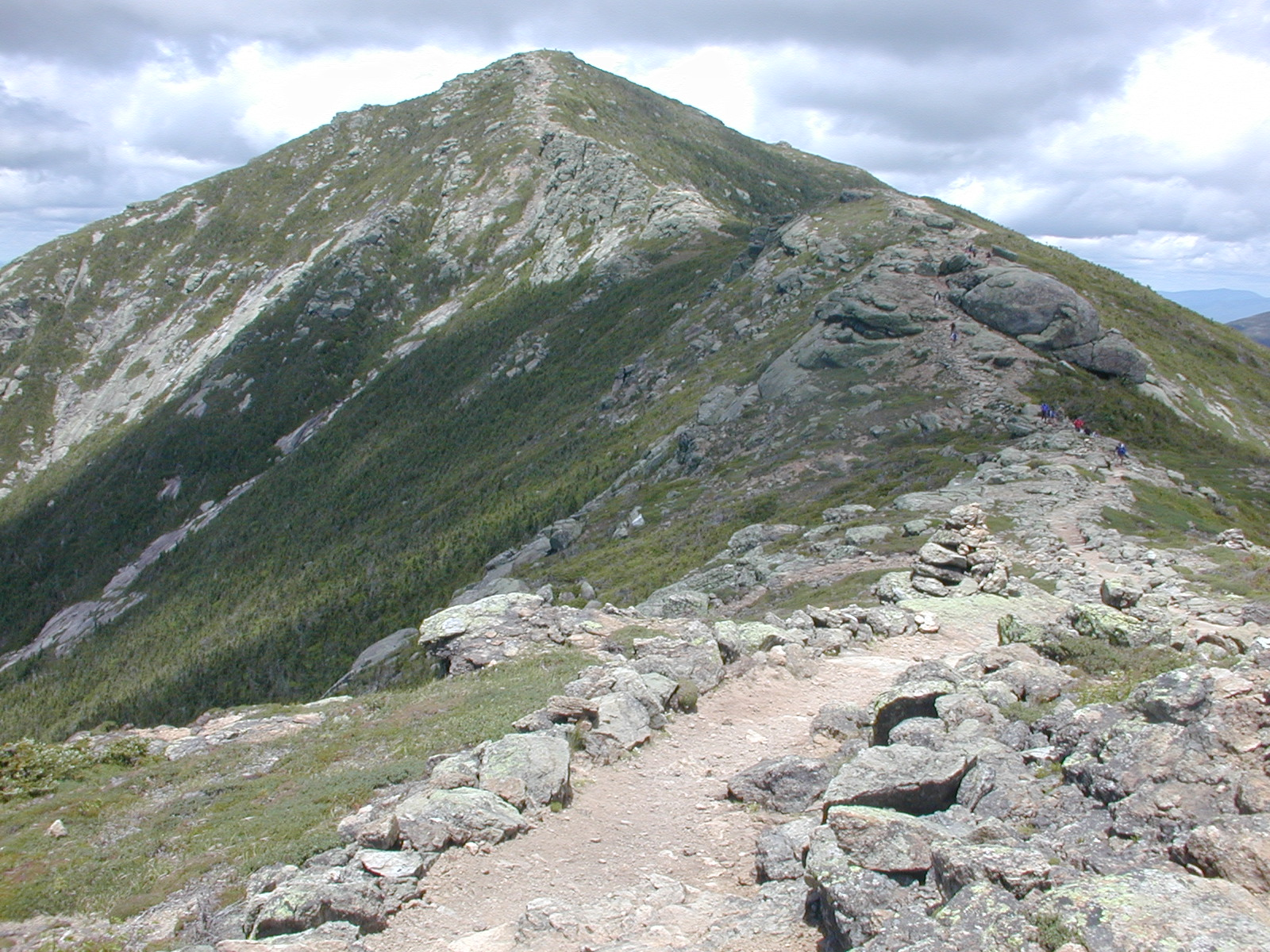
Mount Lincoln, a peak on Franconia Ridge, the western edge of the Pemigewasset Wilderness, as seen from Little Haystack Mountain

The western lobe is enclosed by the Franconia, Twin, and Bond ranges, though the top of the ridge defining the ranges is outside the Wilderness boundary. Moving clockwise from the south near the Lincoln Woods trailhead, the ridge ascends Potash Knob (2,684 ft; 818 m), an unnamed peak (3,060 ft; 930 m), and Whaleback Mountain (2,586 ft; 788 m) before reaching Franconia Ridge itself at the ledgy summit of Mount Flume (4,328 ft; 1,319 m). From Mount Flume, the ridge dips and rises between peaks in a parabolic manner, flirting with treeline in the cols and running open and exposed at the summits. Peaks crossed at this point of the ridge after Flume include Mount Liberty (4,459 ft; 1,359 m), and Little Haystack Mountain (4,780 ft; 1,460 m), where the ridge rises out of the scrub for good. As it heads north, the ridge assumes a "knife-edge" character, dropping off dramatically on both sides as it crosses Mount Lincoln (5,089 ft; 1,551 m) before reaching its high point at the summit of Mount Lafayette (5,249 ft; 1,600 m).

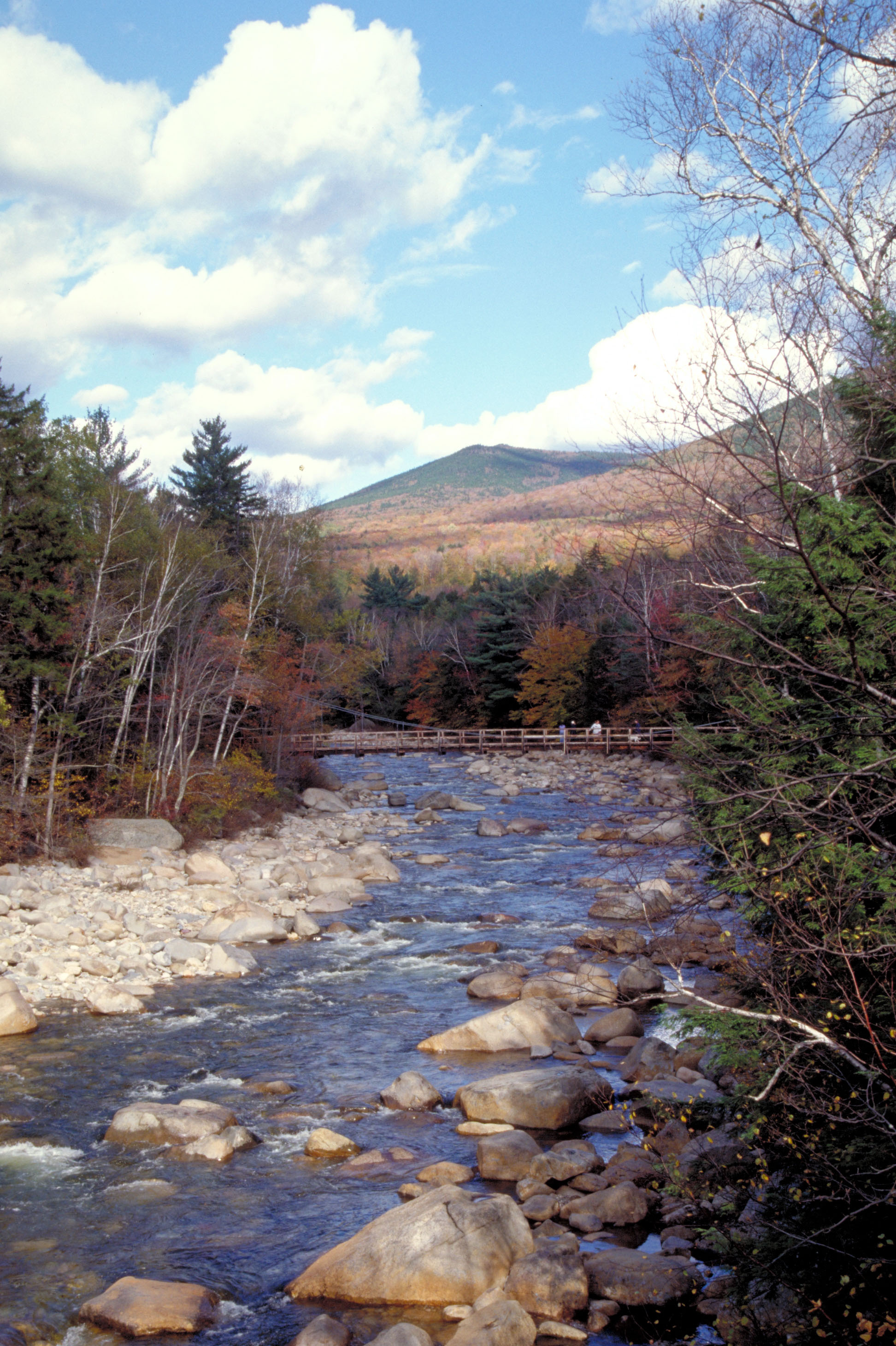
The East Branch of the Pemigewasset River drains the Pemigewasset Wilderness and provides its name. This pedestrian bridge was destroyed following a flood.

From the summit of Lafayette, the ridge, thence known as Garfield Ridge, makes its way toward the Twin Range. It passes over a small subsidiary peak of Lafayette before descending abruptly into the scrub below timberline; after several small knobs, the summits of Garfield (4,500 ft; 1,400 m) and Galehead (4,024 ft; 1,227 m) mountains are crossed, and the ridge breaks into the open and begins a steep climb to the summit of South Twin Mountain (4,902 ft; 1,494 m). As a spur ridge extends north to North Twin Mountain (4,761 ft; 1,451 m), the main ridge makes a southward turn and runs in the open to the summit of Mount Guyot (4,580 ft; 1,400 m). Enclosing the western lobe, the Bond Range extends south from Guyot, passing over Mount Bond (4,698 ft; 1,432 m) and Bondcliff (4,265 ft; 1,300 m) before descending sharply into the woods to the East Branch of the Pemigewasset.

In the center of the western lobe is the long, broad ridge of Owl's Head (4,025 ft; 1,227 m), which rises abruptly from the valley of Lincoln Brook and extends north for roughly 3 miles (4.8 km) to a low saddle connecting it to Garfield Ridge. Almost completely encircling Owl's Head are two tributaries of the East Branch, Lincoln Brook and Franconia Branch; Lincoln Brook drains the east face of Franconia Ridge, while Franconia Branch drains the southern and western faces of the Twin and Bond Ranges through Twin, Redrock, and Hellgate Brooks.

=== Eastern lobe ===
The eastern lobe of the Pemigewasset Wilderness follows fewer well-defined topographic features than the western lobe. The "boundary wall" formed in the west by the Franconia, Twin, and Bond Range is present in the eastern lobe to a degree, but is less obvious.

From Mount Guyot, the eastern lobe's main ridge continues east rather than following the Bond Range to the south. Passing over Zealand Mountain (4,260 ft; 1,300 m) and a small knob known as Zeacliff Pond Peak (4,060 ft; 1,240 m), the ridge reaches an abrupt end at Zeacliff, a dramatic overlook into Zealand Notch. From Zeacliff, the Wilderness Boundary plunges into the notch following the Twinway trail, and follows the Ethan Pond Trail into the flatter sections of the lobe. After a few miles, the boundary picks up the ridge of Mount Lowell, and runs over Mount Nancy (3,926 ft; 1,197 m), Mount Anderson (3,740 ft; 1,140 m), and near the summit of Lowell itself (3,740 ft; 1,140 m) before crossing Carrigain Notch and rising to Vose Spur (3,862 ft; 1,177 m) and the summit of Mount Carrigain (4,700 ft; 1,400 m). Confined to a more obvious ridge at this point, the boundary passes over The Captain (3,540 ft; 1,080 m) and the main summit of Mount Hancock (4,420 ft; 1,350 m) before descending to the East Branch across from Bondcliff via Mount Hitchcock (3,620 ft; 1,100 m) and its several small knobs. Note that the boundary as implemented excludes the Appalachian Trail and the summits it passes over as well as Mount Carrigain.

The East Branch of the Pemigewasset drains the eastern lobe through a number of small streams. Mounts Hancock and Carrigain are drained by Crystal, Carrigain, and Notch Brooks, while the center drains to the North Fork of the Pemigewasset and Shoal Pond Brook.

=== Geology ===
While most of the White Mountains consist of highly metamorphicized schists and gneisses formed during the Acadian Orogeny, the Pemigewasset Wilderness is part of the White Mountain Batholith and is therefore composed primarily of the igneous White Mountain plutonic-volcanic rock series.

The Franconia and Twin Ranges form a massive ring dike in the western half of the White Mountain Batholith made up of a granite porphyry backbone that emerged roughly 170 million years ago. This rock appears pink, red, green or grey, with medium-sized phenocrysts. Such phenocrysts, usually quartz or feldspar, make up 20%-40% of the rock, and are embedded in a groundmass of similar composition. Enclosed by the ring dike and extending in to the flat floor of the wilderness is a large area of biotite and amphibole granite.

== See also ==
- List of U.S. Wilderness Areas
- Wilderness Act
