= East Branch Pemigewasset River =

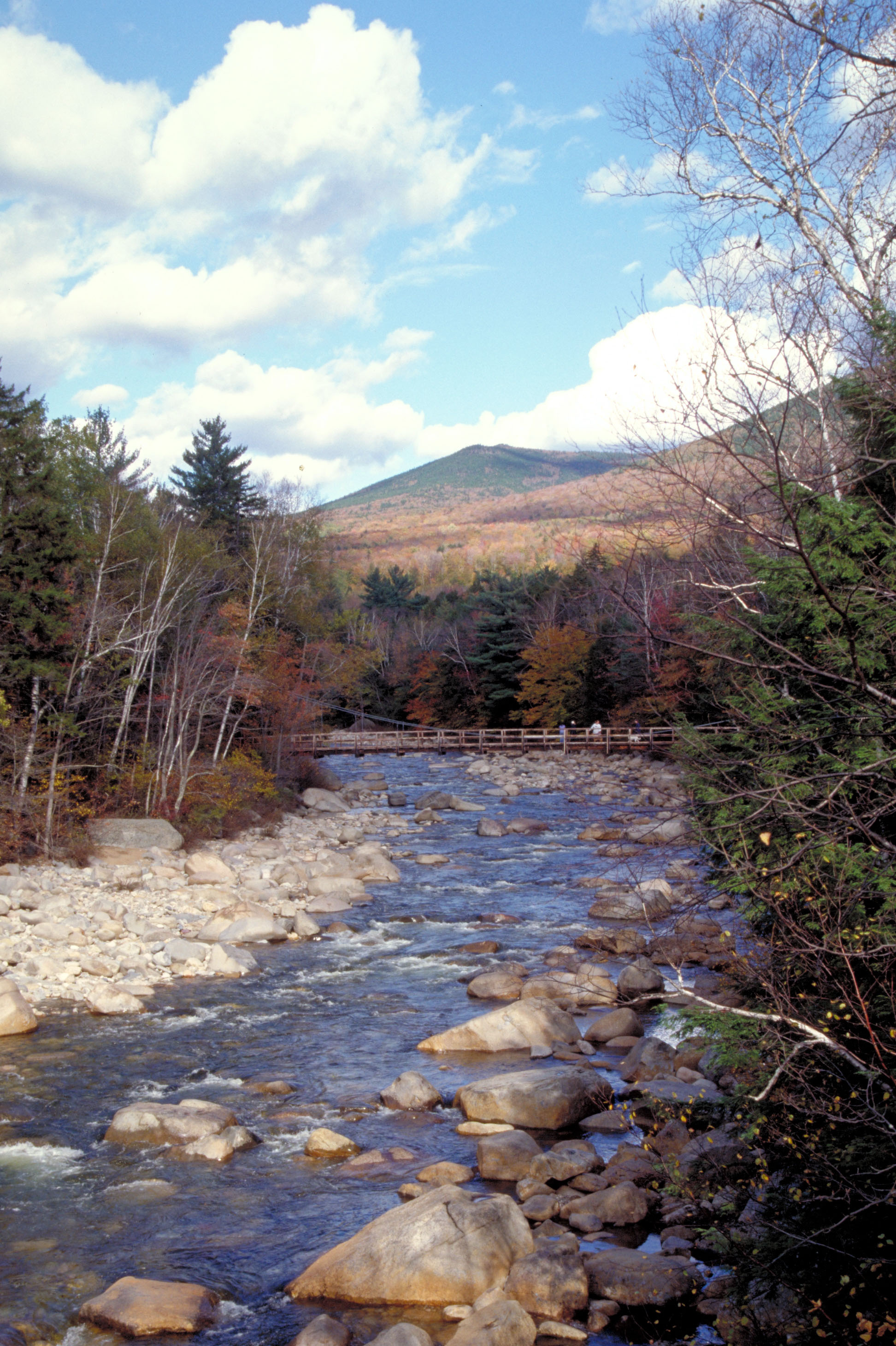
- East Branch of the Pemigewasset River, near the Lincoln Woods Visitor Center

- Location within New Hampshire Location within the United States

Location
- Country: United States
- State: New Hampshire
- County: Grafton
- Towns: Lincoln, Woodstock

Physical characteristics
- Source: Stillwater
  - location: Lincoln
  - coordinates: 44°7′8″N 71°28′12″W
  - elevation: 2,039 ft (621 m)
- Mouth: Pemigewasset River
  - location: North Woodstock
  - coordinates: 44°1′37″N 71°40′59″W
  - elevation: 715 ft (218 m)
- Length: 15.8 mi (25.4 km)

Basin features
- Tributaries
  - left: Carrigain Branch, Hancock Branch
  - right: Shoal Pond Brook, North Fork, Franconia Branch

The East Branch of the Pemigewasset River is a 15.8-mile-long (25.4 km) river located in the White Mountains of New Hampshire in the United States. It is a tributary of the Pemigewasset River, part of the Merrimack River watershed.

The East Branch is a longer and larger river than the river that it flows into, but it is named a branch of the main stem because its source lies deep in the Pemigewasset Wilderness of the White Mountains, while the main Pemigewasset River flows directly from Franconia Notch, a major pass through the mountains. The East Branch begins in the locality known as Stillwater, in a wide valley north of Mount Carrigain and Mount Hancock, where several large brooks converge. The river flows west and southwest through the heart of the Pemigewasset Wilderness, picking up tributaries such as the North Fork of the Pemigewasset and Franconia Branch before reaching, at the Lincoln Woods Visitor Center, the Kancamagus Highway stretch of New Hampshire Route 112.

Now into developed areas, the East Branch meets the Hancock Branch coming from the southeast and flows past the Loon Mountain ski area to the village of Lincoln, New Hampshire. The river crosses into Woodstock and ends at the Pemigewasset River just downstream from the Interstate 93 highway bridges.

== See also ==
- List of rivers of New Hampshire
