= White Mountain National Forest =

National forest in Maine and New Hampshire, US

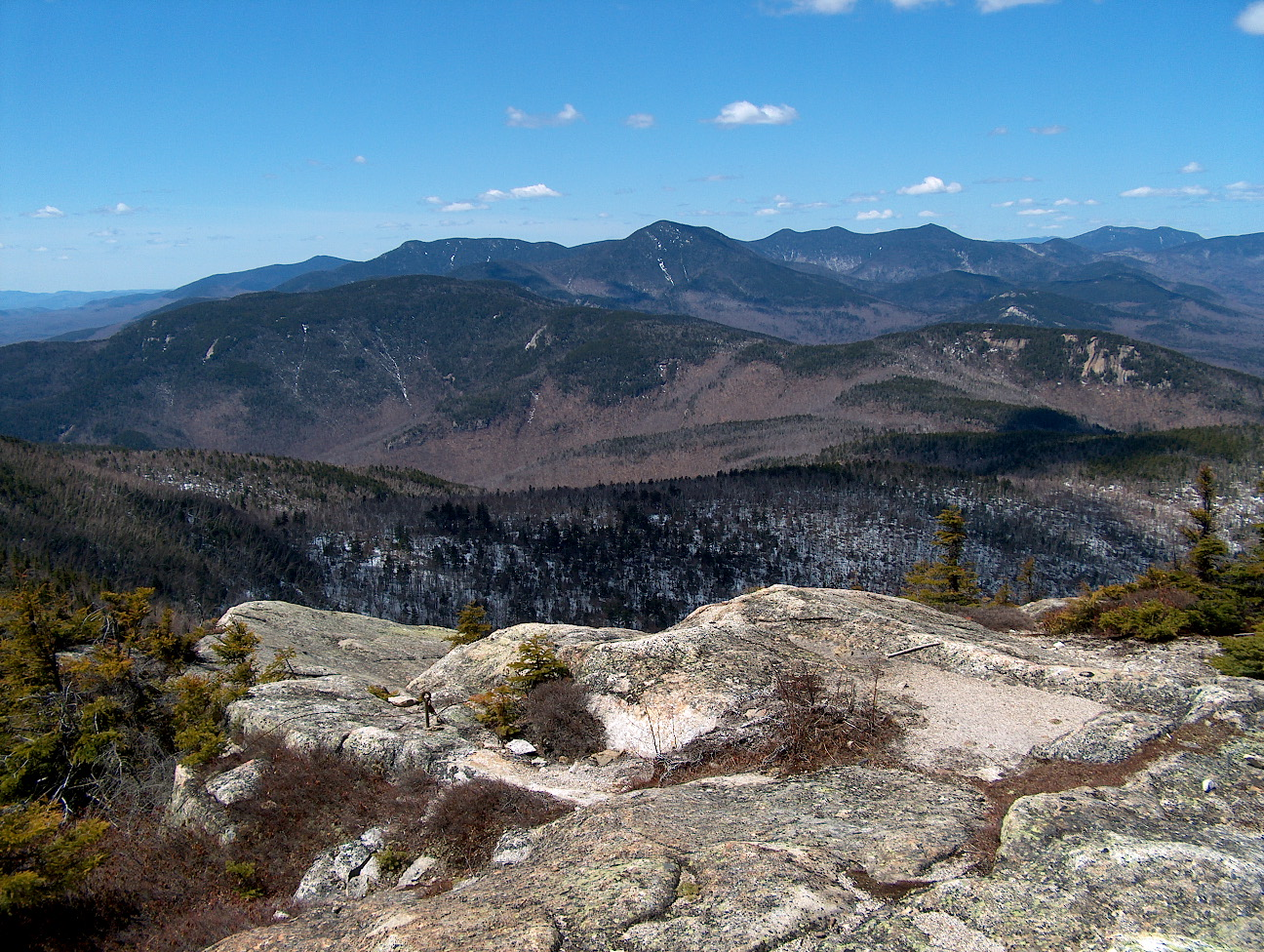
- The Sandwich Range in White Mountain National Forest
- Interactive map of White Mountain National Forest
- Location: New Hampshire / Maine, United States
- Nearest city: Berlin; Conway
- Coordinates: 44.1°N 71.4°W
- Area: 750,852 acres (3,038.59 km^{2})
- Established: May 16, 1918
- Governing body: U.S. Forest Service
- Website: www.fs.usda.gov/whitemountain

The White Mountain National Forest (WMNF) is a federally managed forest contained within the White Mountains in the northeastern United States. It was established in 1918 as a result of the Weeks Act of 1911; federal acquisition of land had already begun in 1914. It has a total area of 750,852 acres (303,859 ha) (1,225 sq mi). Most of the WMNF is in New Hampshire; a small part (about 5.65% of the forest) is in the neighboring state of Maine. Conservationist and community activist Katherine Sleeper Walden was instrumental in securing at-risk land for the forest, including thousands of acres in the region surrounding the locally famous Bowl near Wonalancet.

While sometimes called a park, it is a national forest, used for logging and other limited commercial purposes in addition to recreational activities. The WMNF is the only national forest located in either New Hampshire or Maine, and is the most eastern national forest in the United States. Most of the major peaks over 4,000 feet high in New Hampshire are located in the national forest. Over 100 miles (160 km) of the Appalachian Trail traverses the White Mountain National Forest. In descending order of land area the forest lies in parts of Grafton, Coös, and Carroll counties in New Hampshire, and Oxford County in Maine.

The Forest Supervisor's office is located in Campton and there are three ranger districts: the Pemigewasset District, with offices in Campton; the Androscoggin District, based in Gorham; and the Saco District, based in Conway. Furthermore, there are several visitor centers, including those located at Lincoln, Campton (off Interstate 93), and Lincoln Woods (on the Kancamagus Highway).

The White Mountain National Forest consists of three discontinuous areas, separated by two highways: I-93 and US 2. I-93 travels along Franconia Notch (a narrow north–south valley primarily within a state park), and west of the freeway includes Cannon Mountain, Kinsman Mountain and Mount Moosilauke (though the majority of Moosilauke is privately owned). East of I-93 is the largest section of the Forest, including the Presidential Range and many other ranges - most notably, the Franconia, Twin, Bond, Sandwich, Willey, and Carter-Moriah ranges. North of U.S. Route 2 is the smallest section of the National Forest, covering the Pilot Range and Mount Cabot. Additionally, several other U.S. and NH State highways cross the forest, including US 3, US 302, NH 16 (White Mountain Highway), NH 112 (Kancamagus Highway), and NH 118 (Sawyer Highway).

It is home to wildlife species including bald eagle, raccoon, beaver, white-tailed deer, moose, black bear, coyote, peregrine falcon, Canadian lynx, river otter, bobcat, gray and red foxes, fisher, mink and porcupine.

Six designated Federal Wilderness Areas exist within the Forest: the 27,380-acre (11,080 ha) Presidential Range/Dry River Wilderness, the 5,552-acre (2,247 ha) Great Gulf Wilderness, the 45,000-acre (18,000 ha) Pemigewasset Wilderness, the 35,800-acre (14,500 ha) Sandwich Range Wilderness, the 12,000-acre (4,900 ha) Caribou/Speckled Mountain Wilderness, and the 23,700-acre (9,600 ha) Wild River Wilderness. These areas are protected from logging and commercial industries and are used solely for recreational and scientific purposes. They were formed under the Federal Wilderness Protection Act of 1984, and its amendments. The New England Wilderness Protection Act of 2006 increased the Sandwich Range Wilderness to its present size and created the Wild River Wilderness area.

Because of its beauty, its proximity to major metropolitan areas, its 1,200 miles (1,900 km) of hiking trails, 23 campgrounds, and the presence of many ski areas within or near its boundaries, the WMNF is one of the most visited outdoor recreation sites east of the Mississippi. Winter season lengths are projected to decline across the WMNF due to the effects of global warming, however, which is likely to continue the historic contraction and consolidation of the ski industry and threaten individual ski businesses and communities that rely on ski tourism.

== Weather ==
US Forest Service signs on hiking trails at tree line state that the mountain summit areas have "the worst weather in America". The claim is also used by the observatory near the summit of Mount Washington which once recorded a surface wind speed of 231 miles per hour (372 km/h). Since 1849 at least 169 people have died on Mount Washington and the Presidential Range.

== Image gallery ==
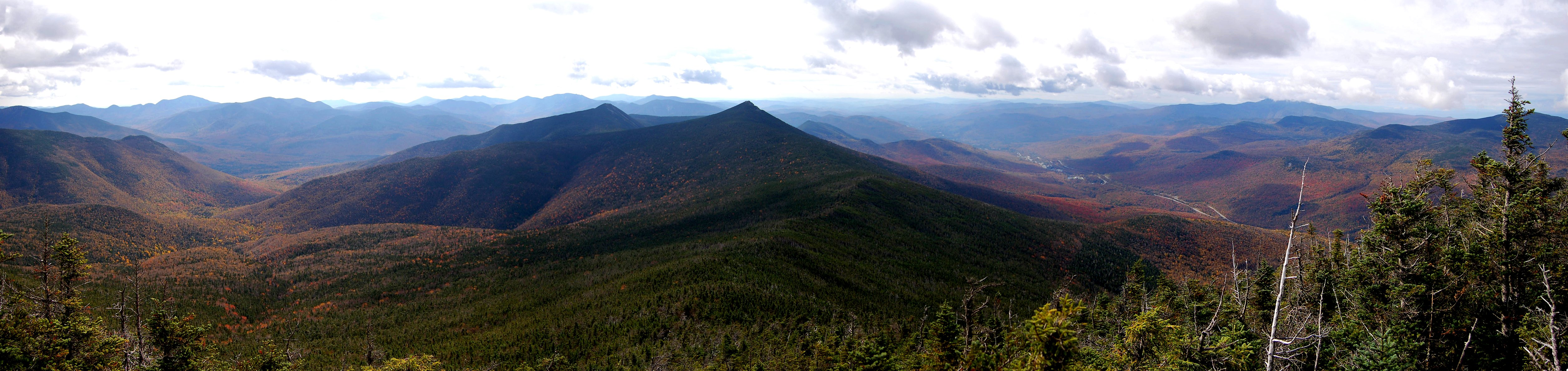
Panorama showing Mt. Liberty, Mt. Flume, parts of the Pemigewasset Wilderness, and parts of Franconia Notch State Park in the White Mountains

== Activities ==
The White Mountain National Forest has various year round activities. There are options for people with an interest in the outdoors.

=== Biking ===
All trails in the White Mountain National Forest are open to mountain bikers unless clearly labeled. Throughout the year there are bike races that are open to the public within the national forest. One of the most popular goes all the way to the top of Mount Washington.

=== Fishing and hunting ===
Monitored by the U.S. Forest Service, fishing and hunting areas are spread out over the White Mountain National Forest. These require New Hampshire fishing/hunting licenses that are routinely checked by EPO officers and game wardens.

=== Hiking ===
There are over 1,200 miles of hiking trails across the national forest that are open to the public to explore. These trails have different levels of severity that range from beginner to advanced.

=== Scenic drives ===
The Kancamagus Highway is a 34-mile (55 km) drive filled with scenery and places to stop for a walk or swim in swimming holes on the side of the road.

== See also ==
- List of national forests of the United States
- New England–Acadian forests
- John W. Weeks, sponsor of the Weeks Act
