= List of mountains of New Hampshire =

List of mountains in the U.S. state of New Hampshire

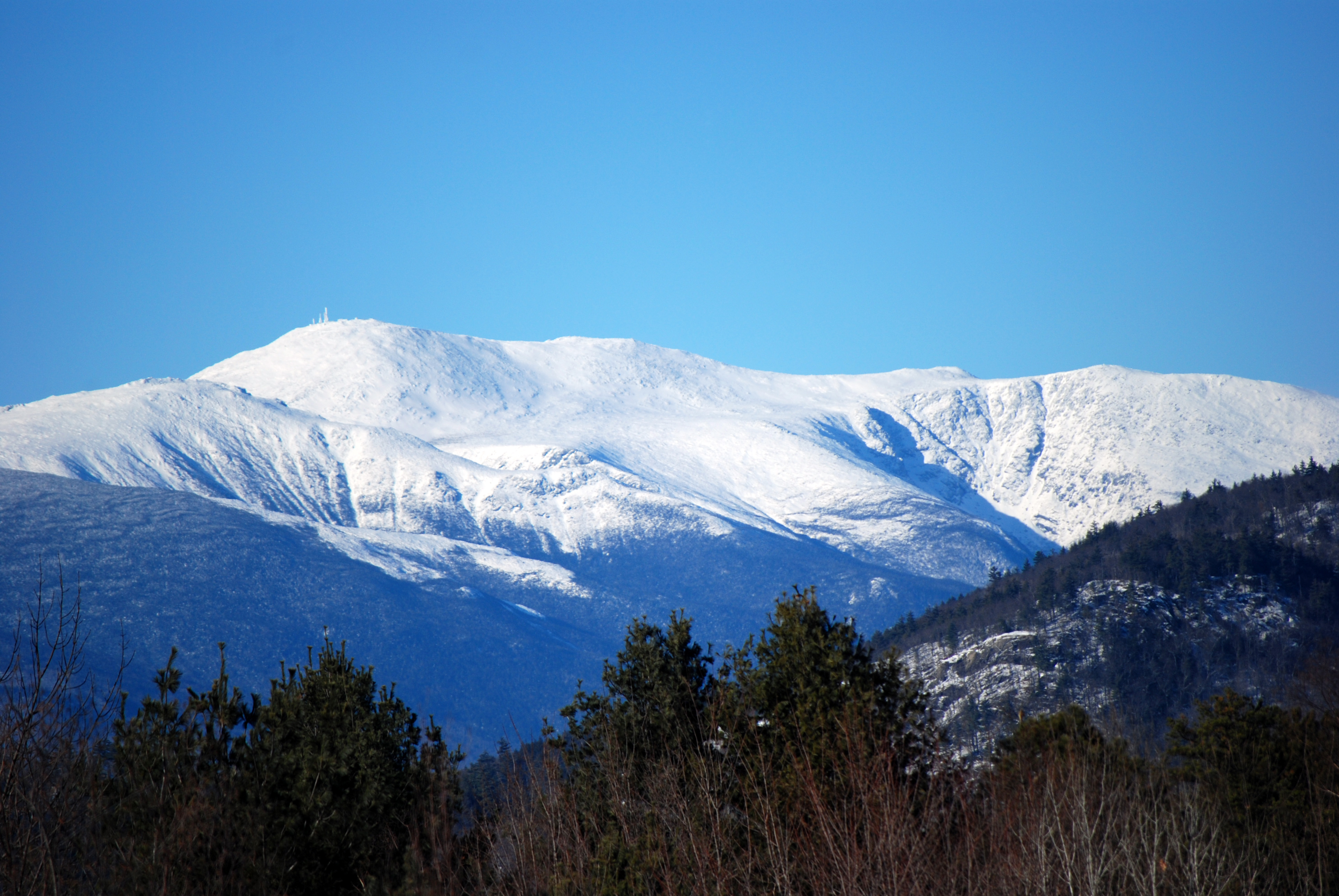
Mount Washington

The below list of mountains in New Hampshire is an incomplete list of mountains in the U.S. state of New Hampshire, with elevation. This list includes many mountains in the White Mountains range that covers about a quarter of the state, as well as mountains outside of that range. Several of the mountains are sites of major alpine ski resorts.

Some of the peaks are included in specific lists of mountains, as denoted in the table:

- 4000 footers – listed on the four-thousand footers, peaks with an elevation of over 4,000 feet (1,200 m), per the Appalachian Mountain Club (AMC)
- 50 Finest – listed on the New England Fifty Finest
- AT – mountain is on the Appalachian Trail, a 2,170-mile (3,490 km) National Scenic Trail from Georgia to Maine
- 100 highest – listed on the New England Hundred Highest, a superset of the four-thousand footers

Note that some peaks with sufficient elevation to be considered four-thousand footers are excluded from the AMC lists because the peak's topographic prominence does not meet AMC's prominence criterion. An example is the 5,532-foot (1,686 m) Mount Clay, located 1.1 miles (1.8 km) north-northwest along the ridge joining the peak of Mount Washington with that of Mount Jefferson, rising less than 200 feet (61 m) above the general trend of that ridge.

Mountain	County	Location	Height (ft. / m)	4000 footers	50 Finest	AT	100 highest	Subpeak of	Notes	Sources
Mount Washington	Coös	Sargent's Purchase	6,288 feet (1,917 m)	✓	✓	✓	✓			
Mount Adams	Coös	Thompson and Meserve's Purchase	5,774 feet (1,760 m)	✓			✓			
Mount Jefferson	Coös	Thompson and Meserve's Purchase	5,712 feet (1,741 m)	✓			✓			
Mount Sam Adams	Coös	Low and Burbank's Grant	5,584 feet (1,702 m)					Mount Adams		
Mount Clay (or Reagan)	Coös	Thompson and Meserve's Purchase	5,532 feet (1,686 m)					Mount Washington		
Boott Spur	Coös	Sargent's Purchase	5,492 feet (1,674 m)					Mount Washington		
Mount Quincy Adams	Coös	Low and Burbank's Grant	5,394 feet (1,644 m)					Mount Adams		
Mount Monroe	Coös	Sargent's Purchase	5,384 feet (1,641 m)	✓			✓			
Mount Madison	Coös	Low and Burbank's Grant	5,367 feet (1,636 m)	✓		✓	✓			
Mount Abigail Adams	Coös	Low and Burbank's Grant	5,348 feet (1,630 m)					Mount Adams		
Mount Adams "5"	Coös	Thompson and Meserve's Purchase	5,266 feet (1,605 m)			✓		Mount Adams		
Mount Lafayette	Grafton	Franconia	5,249 feet (1,600 m)	✓	✓	✓	✓			
Mount Lincoln	Grafton	Franconia	5,089 feet (1,551 m)	✓		✓	✓			
Mount Franklin	Coös	Sargent's Purchase	5,004 feet (1,525 m)					Mount Monroe		
South Twin Mountain	Grafton	Franconia	4,902 feet (1,494 m)	✓		✓	✓			
Carter Dome	Coös	Bean's Purchase	4,832 feet (1,473 m)	✓	✓	✓	✓			
Mount Moosilauke	Grafton	Benton	4,802 feet (1,464 m)	✓	✓	✓	✓			
Mount Eisenhower	Coös	Chandler's Purchase	4,780 feet (1,460 m)	✓			✓			
Little Haystack Mountain	Grafton	Franconia	4,774 feet (1,455 m)			✓		Mount Lincoln		
North Twin Mountain	Grafton	Franconia	4,761 feet (1,451 m)	✓			✓			
Mount Carrigain	Grafton	Lincoln, Livermore	4,700 feet (1,400 m)	✓	✓		✓			
Mount Bond	Grafton	Lincoln	4,698 feet (1,432 m)	✓			✓			
Gulf Peak	Coös	Cutt's Grant	4,692 feet (1,430 m)					Boott Spur		
Mount Hight	Coös	Bean's Purchase	4,675 feet (1,425 m)			✓		Carter Dome		
Middle Carter Mountain	Coös	Bean's Purchase	4,610 feet (1,410 m)	✓		✓	✓			
North Carter Mountain	Coös	Bean's Purchase	4,589 feet (1,399 m)			✓		Middle Carter Mountain		
Mount Guyot	Grafton	Lincoln, Livermore	4,580 feet (1,400 m)			✓		South Twin Mountain		
West Bond Mountain	Grafton	Lincoln	4,540 feet (1,380 m)	✓			✓			
Mount Blue	Grafton	Benton	4,529 feet (1,380 m)					Mount Moosilauke		
South Peak Mount Moosilauke	Grafton	Benton	4,523 feet (1,379 m)					Mount Moosilauke		
Mount Garfield	Grafton	Franconia	4,500 feet (1,400 m)	✓		✓	✓			
Mount Liberty	Grafton	Lincoln	4,459 feet (1,359 m)	✓			✓			
South Carter Mountain	Coös	Bean's Purchase	4,430 feet (1,350 m)	✓		✓	✓			
Wildcat Mountain	Coös	Bean's Purchase	4,422 feet (1,348 m)	✓		✓	✓			
Mount Hancock	Grafton	Lincoln	4,420 feet (1,350 m)	✓			✓			
South Peak Kinsman Mountain	Grafton	Lincoln	4,358 feet (1,328 m)	✓	✓	✓	✓			
Mount Field	Grafton	Bethlehem	4,340 feet (1,320 m)	✓						
Mount Osceola	Grafton	Lincoln, Livermore	4,340 feet (1,320 m)	✓	✓		✓			
Mount Flume	Grafton	Lincoln	4,328 feet (1,319 m)	✓			✓			
South Hancock Mountain	Grafton	Lincoln	4,319 feet (1,316 m)	✓			✓			
Mount Pierce (or Clinton)	Coös	Bean's Grant	4,310 feet (1,310 m)	✓		✓	✓			
Wildcat B	Coös	Bean's Purchase	4,305 feet (1,312 m)			✓		Wildcat Mountain		
North Peak Kinsman Mountain	Grafton	Lincoln	4,293 feet (1,309 m)	✓		✓	✓			
Mount Willey	Grafton	Bethlehem	4,285 feet (1,306 m)	✓			✓			
Wildcat C	Coös	Bean's Purchase	4,285 feet (1,306 m)			✓		Wildcat Mountain		
Bondcliff	Grafton	Lincoln	4,265 feet (1,300 m)	✓			✓			
Mount Zealand	Grafton	Lincoln	4,260 feet (1,300 m)	✓			✓			
North Peak Mount Tripyramid	Grafton	Waterville Valley	4,180 feet (1,270 m)	✓			✓			
Mount Jim	Grafton	Woodstock	4,172 feet (1,272 m)					Mount Moosilauke		
Mount Cabot	Coös	Kilkenny	4,170 feet (1,270 m)	✓	✓		✓			
East Peak Mount Osceola	Grafton	Lincoln, Livermore	4,156 feet (1,267 m)	✓			✓			
Middle Peak Mount Tripyramid	Grafton	Waterville Valley	4,140 feet (1,260 m)	✓			✓			
West Peak Mount Osceola	Grafton	Livermore	4,114 feet (1,254 m)					Mount Osceola		
Cannon Mountain	Grafton	Franconia	4,100 feet (1,200 m)	✓			✓		Cannon Mountain Ski Area	
South Peak Mount Tripyramid	Grafton	Waterville Valley	4,090 feet (1,250 m)					Middle Peak Mount Tripyramid		
Mount Hale	Grafton	Bethlehem	4,054 feet (1,236 m)	✓			✓			
Mount Jackson	Coös	Bean's Grant	4,052 feet (1,235 m)	✓		✓	✓			
Mount Tom	Grafton	Bethlehem	4,051 feet (1,235 m)	✓			✓			
Wildcat D Mountain	Coös	Bean's Purchase	4,050 feet (1,230 m)	✓		✓	✓		Wildcat Mountain Ski Area	
Mount Moriah	Coös	Bean's Purchase	4,049 feet (1,234 m)	✓		✓	✓			
Wildcat E	Coös	Bean's Purchase	4,046 feet (1,233 m)			✓		Wildcat D		
Mount Passaconaway	Grafton	Waterville Valley	4,043 feet (1,232 m)	✓			✓			
Owl's Head (Franconia)	Grafton	Franconia	4,025 feet (1,227 m)	✓			✓			
Galehead	Grafton	Franconia	4,024 feet (1,227 m)	✓			✓			
Mount Whiteface	Grafton	Waterville Valley	4,020 feet (1,230 m)	✓			✓			
Mount Waumbek	Coös	Kilkenny	4,006 feet (1,221 m)	✓			✓			
Mount Isolation	Coös	Sargent's Purchase	4,004 feet (1,220 m)	✓			✓			
Mount Tecumseh	Grafton	Waterville Valley	3,997 feet (1,218 m)	✓			✓		Waterville Valley Resort	
Sandwich Mountain	Carroll	Sandwich	3,983 feet (1,214 m)				✓			
The Bulge	Coös	Kilkenny	3,950 feet (1,200 m)				✓			
Mount Waternomee	Grafton	Woodstock	3,934 feet (1,199 m)							
Mount Nancy	Grafton	Lincoln, Livermore	3,926 feet (1,197 m)				✓			
Mount Webster	Coös	Bean's Grant	3,910 feet (1,190 m)			✓				
The Horn	Coös	Kilkenny	3,905 feet (1,190 m)				✓			
Mount Weeks	Coös	Berlin	3,901 feet (1,189 m)				✓			
Mount Starr King	Coös	Jefferson	3,898 feet (1,188 m)							
South Weeks	Coös	Randolph	3,885 feet (1,184 m)				✓			
Vose Spur	Grafton	Lincoln, Livermore	3,862 feet (1,177 m)				✓			
The Sleepers, East Peak	Grafton	Waterville Valley	3,840 feet (1,170 m)				✓			
Mount Davis	Coös	Sargent's Purchase	3,819 feet (1,164 m)							
Nubble Peak	Grafton	Bethlehem	3,813 feet (1,162 m)				✓			
Scar Ridge	Grafton	Lincoln, Livermore	3,774 feet (1,150 m)				✓			
The Cannon Balls, NE Peak	Grafton	Lincoln	3,769 feet (1,149 m)				✓			
Mount Kancamagus	Grafton	Livermore	3,763 feet (1,147 m)							
Middle Moriah Mountain	Coös	Shelburne	3,755 feet (1,145 m)							
Hutchins Mountain	Coös	Stark	3,739 feet (1,140 m)							
Shelburne Moriah Mountain	Coös	Shelburne	3,734 feet (1,138 m)							
Mount Dartmouth	Coös	Low and Burbank's Grant	3,727 feet (1,136 m)							
Mount Bemis	Grafton	Livermore	3,725 feet (1,135 m)							
Bunnell Mountain	Coös	Columbia	3,724 feet (1,135 m)						Formerly Blue Mountain	
Imp Mountain	Coös	Bean's Purchase	3,720 feet (1,130 m)							
Sugarloaf	Coös	Stratford	3,710 feet (1,130 m)							
Mount Huntington	Grafton	Lincoln, Livermore	3,684 feet (1,123 m)							
Mount Deception	Coös	Carroll	3,671 feet (1,119 m)							
Terrace Mountain	Coös	Kilkenny	3,655 feet (1,114 m)							
Mount Mittersill	Grafton	Franconia	3,650 feet (1,110 m)					Cannon Mountain	Cannon Mountain Ski Area	
Zeacliff	Grafton	Lincoln	3,640 feet (1,110 m)			✓		Mount Zealand		
Stub Hill	Coös	Pittsburg	3,626 feet (1,105 m)							
Gore Mountain	Coös	Stratford	3,619 feet (1,103 m)							
North Baldface	Coös	Bean's Purchase	3,606 feet (1,099 m)							
Pliny Mountain	Coös	Kilkenny	3,606 feet (1,099 m)							
Scaur Peak	Grafton	Waterville Valley	3,605 feet (1,099 m)					Mount Tripyramid		
Whaleback Mountain	Grafton	Lincoln	3,586 feet (1,093 m)							
Cherry Mountain (Mount Martha)	Coös	Carroll	3,573 feet (1,089 m)							
Castle Mountain	Coös	Stratford	3,567 feet (1,087 m)							
Mount Success	Coös	Success	3,565 feet (1,087 m)			✓				
Mount Clough	Grafton	Benton	3,561 feet (1,085 m)							
The Fool Killer	Grafton	Waterville Valley	3,548 feet (1,081 m)					Mount Tripyramid		
South Baldface	Carroll	Chatham	3,547 feet (1,081 m)							
Sable Mountain	Carroll	Chatham	3,519 feet (1,073 m)							
Savage Mountain	Coös	Stratford	3,510 feet (1,070 m)							
Mount Wolf	Grafton	Lincoln	3,480 feet (1,060 m)							
Mount Chocorua	Carroll	Albany	3,475 feet (1,059 m)							
Mount Kelsey	Coös	Millsfield	3,472 feet (1,058 m)							
Dixville Peak	Coös	Dixville	3,471 feet (1,058 m)							
Goback Mountain	Coös	Stratford	3,461 feet (1,055 m)							
Stairs Mountain	Coös	Sargent's Purchase	3,455 feet (1,053 m)							
Carr Mountain	Grafton	Wentworth	3,453 feet (1,052 m)							
Mount Bowman	Coös	Low and Burbank's Grant	3,445 feet (1,050 m)					Mount Jefferson		
Mount Avalon	Grafton	Bethlehem	3,442 feet (1,049 m)							
Jennings Peak	Grafton	Waterville Valley	3,440 feet (1,050 m)					Sandwich Mountain		
North Percy Peak	Coös	Stratford	3,430 feet (1,050 m)							
Salmon Mountain	Coös	Pittsburg	3,425 feet (1,044 m)							
Mount Resolution	Coös	Sargent's Purchase	3,415 feet (1,041 m)							
Whitewall Mountain	Grafton	Bethlehem	3,405 feet (1,038 m)							
Notch Mountain	Coös	Stratford	3,402 feet (1,037 m)					Gore Mountain		
Mount Magalloway	Coös	Pittsburg	3,383 feet (1,031 m)							
Rice Mountain	Coös	Dixville	3,383 feet (1,031 m)							
Teapot Mountain	Coös	Stratford	3,380 feet (1,030 m)							
Mount Tremont	Carroll	Bartlett	3,371 feet (1,027 m)							
Chandler Mountain	Carroll	Jackson	3,335 feet (1,017 m)							
Black Mountain	Carroll	Jackson	3,304 feet (1,007 m)						Black Mountain Ski Area	
Big Coolidge Mountain	Grafton	Lincoln	3,294 feet (1,004 m)							
Crystal Mountain	Coös	Dix's Grant	3,270 feet (1,000 m)							
Kearsarge North	Carroll	Chatham	3,268 feet (996 m)							
Owl's Head (Carroll)	Coös	Carroll	3,258 feet (993 m)							
Black Crescent Mountain	Coös	Randolph	3,255 feet (992 m)							
Mount Crescent	Coös	Randolph	3,251 feet (991 m)							
Smarts Mountain	Grafton	Lyme	3,238 feet (987 m)		✓					
Flat Top Mountain	Grafton	Franconia	3,238 feet (987 m)							
South Percy Peak	Coös	Stratford	3,234 feet (986 m)							
Mount Cushman	Grafton	Woodstock	3,221 feet (982 m)							
Mount Paugus	Carroll	Albany	3,198 feet (975 m)							
North Moat Mountain	Carroll	Bartlett	3,195 feet (974 m)							
North Blue Mountain	Coös	Columbia	3,190 feet (970 m)							
Mount Monadnock	Cheshire	Jaffrey	3,165 feet (965 m)		✓				Monadnock-Sunapee Greenway	
Mount Cardigan	Grafton	Orange	3,155 feet (962 m)		✓					
Mount Crawford	Coös	Hadley's Purchase	3,118 feet (950 m)							
West Royce Mountain	Coös	Bean's Purchase	3,116 feet (950 m)							
Mount Echo	Grafton	Bethlehem	3,084 feet (940 m)							
Mount Pisgah	Coös	Clarksville	3,081 feet (939 m)							
Mount Randolph	Coös	Randolph	3,081 feet (939 m)							
Loon Mountain	Grafton	Lincoln, Livermore	3,065 feet (934 m)						Loon Mountain Ski Resort	
Wolf Cub	Grafton	Lincoln	3,063 feet (934 m)					Mount Wolf		
South Whaleback	Grafton	Lincoln	3,060 feet (930 m)					Whaleback Mountain		
Mount Mitten	Coös	Low and Burbank's Grant	3,058 feet (932 m)							
Mount Doublehead	Carroll	Jackson	3,053 feet (931 m)							
Mount Stickney	Grafton	Bethlehem	3,043 feet (928 m)					Mount Echo	Bretton Woods Mountain Resort	
Firescrew	Grafton	Orange	3,040 feet (930 m)					Mount Cardigan		
East Spruce Mountain	Coös	Stratford	3,010 feet (920 m)							
Mount Parker	Carroll	Bartlett	3,004 feet (916 m)							
South Sugarloaf	Grafton	Bethlehem	3,002 feet (915 m)							
Bear Mountain	Carroll	Bartlett	2,995 feet (913 m)							
Jeffers Mountain	Grafton	Benton	2,994 feet (913 m)							
Mount Shaw	Carroll	Moultonborough	2,990 feet (910 m)		✓					
Bartlett Haystack	Carroll	Bartlett	2,980 feet (910 m)							
Noon Peak	Grafton	Waterville Valley	2,976 feet (907 m)					Sandwich Mountain		
Mount Rosebrook	Grafton	Bethlehem	2,976 feet (907 m)						Bretton Woods Mountain Resort	
Howe Peak	Coös	Shelburne	2,966 feet (904 m)							
Flume Peak	Grafton	Waterville Valley	2,952 feet (900 m)							
Perry Ponds Peak	Coös	Pittsburg	2,948 feet (899 m)							
West Peak Mount Magalloway	Coös	Pittsburg	2,946 feet (898 m)							
Northwest Peak Black Mountain	Coös	Wentworth Location	2,944 feet (897 m)							
West Peak Baldface Mountain	Coös	Bean's Purchase	2,941 feet (896 m)							
Hibbard Mountain	Grafton	Waterville Valley	2,940 feet (900 m)					Mount Passaconaway		
Eastman Mountain	Carroll	Chatham	2,939 feet (896 m)							
Black Mountain	Grafton	Lincoln	2,937 feet (895 m)							
Mount Kearsarge (Merrimack County)	Merrimack	Warner, Wilmot	2,937 feet (895 m)		✓					
Attitash Mountain	Carroll	Bartlett	2,910 feet (890 m)						Attitash Mountain Resort	
Mount Cube	Grafton	Orford	2,909 feet (887 m)			✓				
Spruce Mountain	Coös	Stratford	2,904 feet (885 m)							
Stinson Mountain	Grafton	Rumney	2,900 feet (880 m)84							
Tumble Dick Mountain	Coös	Dixville	2,900 feet (880 m)							
North Bald Cap	Coös	Success	2,893 feet (882 m)							
Millsfield Mountain	Coös	Millsfield	2,889 feet (881 m)							
Lowes Bald Spot	Coös	Thompson and Meserve's Purchase	2,884 feet (879 m)							
Mount Dustan	Coös	Wentworth Location	2,878 feet (877 m)							
Mount Willard	Carroll	Hart's Location	2,865 feet (873 m)							
South Peak Mount Cardigan	Grafton	Orange	2,864 feet (873 m)					Mount Cardigan		
West Peak Whitcomb Mountain	Coös	Odell	2,840 feet (870 m)							
Moran Notch Mountain	Coös	Columbia	2,830 feet (860 m)							
Mount Tucker	Coös	Second College Grant	2,821 feet (860 m)							
Black Mountain	Grafton	Benton	2,820 feet (860 m)							
South Peak Loon Mountain	Grafton	Lincoln	2,807 feet (856 m)					Loon Mountain	Loon Mountain Ski Resort	
North Peak	Coös	Stark	2,804 feet (855 m)							
Black Snout Mountain	Carroll	Moultonborough, Tamworth	2,803 feet (854 m)							
Deer Ridge	Coös	Milan	2,802 feet (854 m)							
Norton Pool Mountain	Coös	Pittsburg	2,792 feet (851 m)							
Currier Mountain	Coös	Low and Burbank's Grant	2,790 feet (850 m)							
Sachem Peak	Grafton	Waterville Valley	2,784 feet (849 m)							
West Peak Mount Randolph	Coös	Randolph	2,782 feet (848 m)					Mount Randolph		
Mount Meader	Coös	Bean's Purchase	2,782 feet (848 m)							
Faraway Mountain	Carroll	Moultonborough	2,782 feet (848 m)							
Hogback Mountain	Grafton	Waterville Valley	2,770 feet (840 m)							
Croydon Peak	Sullivan	Croydon	2,766 feet (843 m)							
Mount Wonalancet	Grafton	Waterville Valley	2,760 feet (840 m)							
Lilly Ledge	Coös	Sargent's Purchase	2,756 feet (840 m)							
Mount Patience	Coös	Millsfield	2,750 feet (840 m)							
Scott Bog Mountain	Coös	Pittsburg	2,749 feet (838 m)							
Camp Seven Mountain	Coös	Pittsburg	2,745 feet (837 m)							
Mount Gloriette	Coös	Dixville	2,740 feet (840 m)							
Square Mountain	Coös	Kilkenny	2,735 feet (834 m)							
Dickey Mountain	Grafton	Waterville Valley	2,734 feet (833 m)							
Baldhead Mountain	Coös	Columbia	2,729 feet (832 m)							
Mount Sunapee	Merrimack	Newbury	2,726 feet (831 m)						Mount Sunapee Resort, Monadnock-Sunapee Greenway	
Piermont Mountain	Grafton	Piermont	2,717 feet (828 m)							
Potash Mountain	Grafton	Waterville Valley	2,700 feet (820 m)							
Mount Oscar	Grafton	Bethlehem	2,700 feet (820 m)						Bretton Woods Mountain Resort	
Black Mountain	Coös	Cambridge	2,694 feet (821 m)							
Potash Knob	Grafton	Lincoln	2,684 feet (818 m)							
Orange Mountain	Grafton	Orange	2,684 feet (818 m)							
Blueberry Mountain	Grafton	Benton	2,662 feet (811 m)							
Bartlett Mountain	Carroll	Bartlett	2,661 feet (811 m)							
Mount Israel	Carroll	Sandwich	2,620 feet (800 m)							
Welch Mountain	Grafton	Waterville Valley	2,605 feet (794 m)							
Mount Roberts	Carroll	Moultonborough	2,582 feet (787 m)							
Mount Pemigewasset (Indian Head)	Grafton	Lincoln	2,557 feet (779 m)							
Mount Weetamoo	Grafton	Campton	2,520 feet (770 m)							
Mill Mountain	Coös	Stark	2,517 feet (767 m)							
Mount Rosa	Cheshire	Jaffrey	2,510 feet (770 m)					Mount Monadnock		
Little Attitash Mountain	Carroll	Bartlett	2,504 feet (763 m)					Attitash Mountain		
Middle Sugarloaf	Grafton	Bethlehem	2,503 feet (763 m)							
Lovewell Mountain	Sullivan	Washington	2,473 feet (754 m)							
Jericho Mountain (or Black Mountain)	Coös	Berlin	2,454 feet (748 m)							
Russell Mountain	Grafton	Woodstock	2,424 feet (739 m)							
Little Coolidge Mountain	Grafton	Lincoln	2,421 feet (738 m)					Big Coolidge Mountain		
Hedgehog Nubble	Coös	Pittsburg	2,421 feet (738 m)							
Pine Mountain	Coös	Gorham	2,405 feet (733 m)							
Mount Langdon	Carroll	Bartlett	2,390 feet (730 m)							
Campton Mountain	Grafton	Campton	2,387 feet (728 m)							
Crane Mountain	Grafton	Orange	2,385 feet (727 m)							
Belknap Mountain	Belknap	Gilford	2,382 feet (726 m)		✓					
Mount Agassiz	Grafton	Bethlehem	2,378 feet (725 m)							
Mowglis Mountain	Grafton	Alexandria	2,370 feet (720 m)							
Black Cap	Carroll	Conway	2,369 feet (722 m)							
Tenney Mountain	Grafton	Groton	2,350 feet (720 m)						Tenney Mountain Ski Resort	
Bald Mountain	Grafton	Franconia	2,340 feet (710 m)							
Willoughby Mountain	Grafton	Rumney	2,336 feet (712 m)					Carr Mountain		
Artists Bluff	Grafton	Franconia	2,320 feet (710 m)							
Moose Mountain	Grafton	Hanover	2,313 feet (705 m)			✓				
Pack Monadnock	Hillsborough	Peterborough	2,290 feet (700 m)						Miller State Park	
Cow Mountain	Coös	Dummer	2,289 feet (698 m)							
Ragged Mountain	Merrimack	Andover	2,286 feet (697 m)						Ragged Mountain Resort	
Thorn Mountain	Carroll	Jackson	2,282 feet (696 m)						Thorn Mountain Ski Area (closed 1956)	
North Pack Monadnock	Hillsborough	Greenfield	2,276 feet (694 m)						Wapack Trail	
Brown Mountain	Grafton	Alexandria	2,270 feet (690 m)							
Gunstock Mountain	Belknap	Gilford	2,245 feet (684 m)							
Mount Ingalls	Coös	Shelburne	2,242 feet (683 m)							
Oregon Mountain	Grafton	Alexandria	2,239 feet (682 m)							
Mount Crosby	Grafton	Groton	2,238 feet (682 m)							
Mount Cilley	Grafton	Woodstock	2,227 feet (679 m)							
North Sugarloaf	Grafton	Bethlehem	2,221 feet (677 m)							
Mount Morgan	Grafton	Campton	2,220 feet (680 m)							
Mount Percival	Grafton	Campton	2,212 feet (674 m)							
Mount Whittier	Carroll	Tamworth	2,205 feet (672 m)							
Turtleback Mountain	Carroll	Moultonborough	2,203 feet (671 m)							
Grafton Knob	Grafton	Orange	2,201 feet (671 m)							
Hix Mountain	Grafton	Thornton	2,198 feet (670 m)							
Mount Surprise	Coös	Shelburne	2,194 feet (669 m)					Mount Moriah		
Plymouth Mountain	Grafton	Plymouth	2,193 feet (668 m)							
Silver Mountain	Sullivan	Lempster	2,190 feet (670 m)							
Melvin Mountain	Grafton	Grafton	2,177 feet (664 m)							
Barber Mountain	Grafton	Grafton	2,166 feet (660 m)							
Pitcher Mountain	Cheshire	Stoddard	2,153 feet (656 m)							
Round Mountain	Coös	Milan	2,150 feet (660 m)							
Cone Mountain	Grafton	Thornton	2,132 feet (650 m)							
Upper Rattlesnake Mountain	Grafton	Rumney	2,126 feet (648 m)							
Hurricane Mountain	Carroll	Conway	2,100 feet (640 m)							
Larcom Mountain	Carroll	Tamworth	2,093 feet (638 m)							
Prospect Mountain	Coös	Lancaster	2,077 feet (633 m)							
Canaan Mountain	Carroll	Tuftonboro	2,073 feet (632 m)							
Ames Mountain	Grafton	Wentworth	2,070 feet (630 m)							
Crotched Mountain	Hillsborough	Francestown	2,066 feet (630 m)							
Tate Mountain (Big Ball Mountain)	Carroll	Tuftonboro	2,060 feet (630 m)							
Piper Mountain	Belknap	Gilford	2,044 feet (623 m)							
Temple Mountain	Hillsborough	Temple, Sharon	2,045 feet (623 m)							
Mount Forest (Mount Forist)	Coös	Berlin	2,031 feet (619 m)							
Tin Mountain	Carroll	Jackson	2,031 feet (619 m)							
Red Hill	Carroll	Moultonborough	2,030 feet (620 m)							
Mount Mexico	Carroll	Albany	2,020 feet (620 m)							
Grandview Mountain	Grafton	Woodstock	2,012 feet (613 m)							
Burton Peak	Hillsborough	Temple, Sharon	2,010 feet (610 m)							
Mount Klem	Belknap	Gilford	2,001 feet (610 m)							
Skatutakee Mountain	Hillsborough	Hancock	1,998 feet (609 m)							
Thumb Mountain	Hillsborough	Hancock	1,978 feet (603 m)							
Mount Mack	Belknap	Gilford	1,945 feet (593 m)							
Mount Pickering	Carroll	Bartlett	1,930 feet (590 m)							
Little Roundtop Mountain	Coös	Cambridge	1,930 feet (590 m)							
Straightback Mountain	Belknap	Alton	1,910 feet (580 m)							
Gap Mountain	Cheshire	Troy	1,900 feet (580 m)							
Little Monadnock Mountain	Cheshire	Fitzwilliam	1,900 feet (580 m)							
West Quarry Mountain	Belknap	Alton	1,894 feet (577 m)					East Quarry Mountain		
South Straightback Mountain	Belknap	Alton	1,890 feet (580 m)					Straightback Mountain		
Green Mountain	Carroll	Effingham	1,884 feet (574 m)							
Mount Rand	Belknap	Gilford	1,883 feet (574 m)					Mount Klem		
New Ipswich Mountain	Hillsborough	New Ipswich	1,881 feet (573 m)							
Copple Crown Mountain	Carroll	Brookfield	1,868 feet (569 m)							
Middle Mountain	Carroll	Conway	1,857 feet (566 m)							
Barrett Mountain	Hillsborough	New Ipswich	1,853 feet (565 m)							
Bayle Mountain	Carroll	Ossipee	1,853 feet (565 m)							
Suncook Mountain	Belknap	Gilford	1,851 feet (564 m)							
Sunday Mountain	Grafton	Orford	1,823 feet (556 m)							
Pratt Mountain	Hillsborough	New Ipswich	1,817 feet (554 m)							
Heator Mountain	Belknap	Gilford	1,806 feet (550 m)							
Kidder Mountain	Hillsborough	New Ipswich	1,805 feet (550 m)							
Bald Knob	Carroll	Moultonborough	1,801 feet (549 m)							
Bog Mountain	Merrimack	Wilmot	1,787 feet (545 m)							
Mount Major	Belknap	Alton	1,786 feet (544 m)							
Grant Peak	Belknap	Ossipee	1,783 feet (543 m)							
Little Black Mountain	Grafton	Haverhill	1,782 feet (543 m)					Black Mountain (Benton)		
Wanosha Mountain	Grafton	Thornton	1,777 feet (542 m)							
Rollstone Mountain	Cheshire	Nelson	1,772 feet (540 m)							
Peaked Mountain	Carroll	Conway	1,739 feet (530 m)							
Mount Stanton	Carroll	Bartlett	1,716 feet (523 m)							
Whitcomb Peak	Hillsborough	Temple	1,710 feet (520 m)							
Little Ball Mountain	Carroll	Tuftonboro	1,706 feet (520 m)					Tate Mountain		
Nickerson Mountain	Carroll	Ossipee	1,700 feet (520 m)							
Mount Rowe	Belknap	Gilford	1,680 feet (510 m)					Gunstock Mountain		
Sentinel Mountain	Carroll	Tuftonboro	1,680 feet (510 m)							
Cranmore Mountain	Carroll	Conway	1,667 feet (508 m)							
Mount Anna	Belknap	Gilmanton	1,660 feet (510 m)					Straightback Mountain		
Foss Mountain	Carroll	Eaton	1,657 feet (505 m)							
Barron Mountain	Grafton	Woodstock, Thornton	1,650 feet (500 m)							
Mount Tug	Grafton	Lebanon	1,644 feet (501 m)							
Rattlesnake Mountain	Carroll	Conway	1,580 feet (480 m)							
Mount Swett	Belknap	Gilmanton	1,535 feet (468 m)							
Rockhouse Mountain	Carroll	Madison	1,505 feet (459 m)							
Burleigh Mountain	Belknap	New Hampton	1,462 feet (446 m)							
Mount Evans	Coös	Shelburne	1,443 feet (440 m)							
Cave Mountain	Carroll	Bartlett	1,439 feet (439 m)							
Knox Mountain	Carroll	Ossipee	1,424 feet (434 m)							
Mount Crag	Coös	Shelburne	1,412 feet (430 m)							
Mount Katherine	Carroll	Sandwich	1,371 feet (418 m)							
Wantastiquet Mountain	Cheshire	Hinsdale	1,384 feet (422 m)							
Blue Job Mountain	Strafford	Farmington	1,356 feet (413 m)							
North Peak Uncanoonuc Mountains	Hillsborough	Goffstown	1,324 feet (404 m)							
South Peak Uncanoonuc Mountains	Hillsborough	Goffstown	1,321 feet (403 m)							
Mount Pisgah	Cheshire	Winchester	1,319 feet (402 m)							
East Rattlesnake	Carroll	Sandwich	1,289 feet (393 m)							
Mount Shannon	Belknap	Gilmanton	1,265 feet (386 m)							
West Rattlesnake	Grafton	Holderness	1,243 feet (379 m)							
Daniels Mountain	Cheshire	Hinsdale	1,230 feet (370 m)							
Mount Dearborn	Hillsborough	Weare	1,211 feet (369 m)							
Mount Long Stack	Carroll	Wolfeboro	1,204 feet (367 m)							
Hussey Mountain	Strafford	Farmington	1,204 feet (367 m)							
Phoebe's Nable Mountain	Strafford	Middleton	1,185 feet (361 m)							
Stone Mountain	Cheshire	Winchester	1,168 feet (356 m)							
Cedar Mountain	Belknap	Alton	1,082 feet (330 m)							
Chesley Mountain	Strafford	Farmington	1,020 feet (310 m)							
Mount Caesar	Cheshire	Swanzey	965 feet (294 m)							
Hall Mountain	Rockingham	Candia	941 feet (287 m)							
Mount Pisgah	Rockingham	Auburn	550 feet (170 m)							

== See also ==
- Peak bagging lists of New Hampshire mountains. These include:
  - Northeast 111 4000-footers
    - New England Four-thousand footers
  - New England Hundred Highest
  - New England Fifty Finest
- Mountain ranges in New Hampshire; see Category:Mountain ranges of New Hampshire.
- List of mountains of the Appalachians
