= Rosebrook =

Rosebrook may refer to:

- Rosebrook, New South Wales, a locality in Australia
- Rosebrook, Victoria, a locality in Australia
- Rose Brook, a river in New York
- Mount Rosebrook, a mountain in New Hampshire
- David Rosebrook
