= Mount Hight =

Mountain in the state of New Hampshire

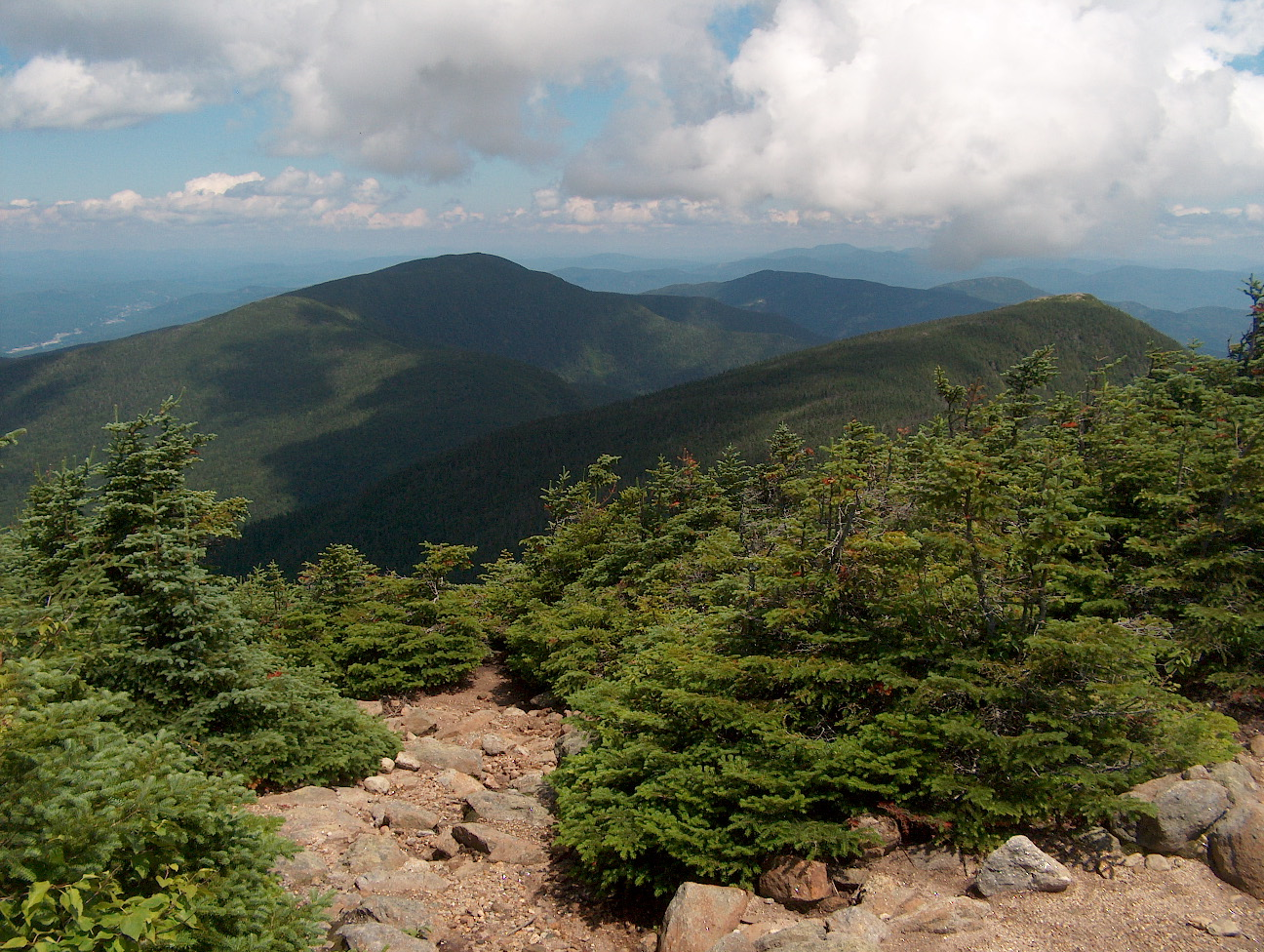
- The balding summit of Mount Hight to the right; Middle Carter Mountain to the left.

Highest point
- Elevation: 4,675 ft (1,425 m)
- Prominence: 125 ft (38 m)
- Coordinates: 44°16′33″N 071°10′11″W

Geography
- Location: Coös County, New Hampshire, U.S.
- Parent range: Carter-Moriah Range
- Topo map: USGS Carter Dome

Mount Hight is a mountain located in Coos County, New Hampshire. The mountain is part of the Carter-Moriah Range of the White Mountains, which runs along the eastern-northeastern side of Pinkham Notch. Mount Hight is flanked on the north by South Carter Mountain across Zeta Pass, and on the southwest by Carter Dome.

Although well over 4,000 feet (1,200 m) in height, the Appalachian Mountain Club does not consider Hight a "four-thousand footer" because the col on the ridge from Carter Dome only descends 125 ft (38 m), making it a secondary summit of that peak.

The balding summit of Mount Hight has the broadest views of any summit of the Carter-Moriah Range. Conversely, Carter Dome, the highest peak in the range, is wooded and has only limited views.

== See also ==
- List of mountains in New Hampshire
- White Mountain National Forest
