= Bear Mountain (New Hampshire) =

Mountain in the American state of New Hampshire

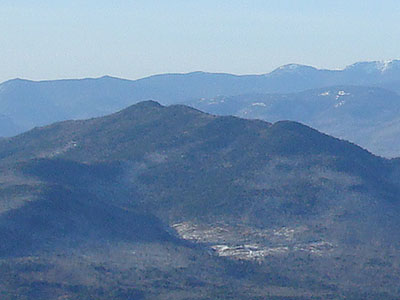
- Bear Mountain seen from Mt. Chocorua

Highest point
- Elevation: 3,219 feet (981 m)
- Prominence: 1,422 ft (433 m)
- Coordinates: 44°01′49″N 71°18′07″W

Geography
- Location: Carroll County, New Hampshire U.S.
- Topo map: USGS Bartlett (1:24,000)

Bear Mountain is a 3,219-foot (981 m) mountain located in Bartlett, New Hampshire, USA. Bear Mountain is flanked to the northwest, across Bear Notch, by Bartlett Haystack (2,995 ft / 1,027 m). To the east is Table Mountain (2,675 ft / 815 m), followed by Big Attitash Mountain (2,920 ft / 890 m). The north side of Bear Mountain drains via Louisville Brook and Albany Brook to the Saco River in Bartlett. The southern slopes of the mountain drain to the Swift River, on the southwest via Douglas Brook and on the southeast via Cilley Brook, which joins the Swift River at Rocky Gorge.

Once home to an alpine ski trail, Bear Mountain is sometimes confused with nearby Bear Peak at the Attitash ski area.

== See also ==
- List of mountains in New Hampshire
- White Mountain National Forest
