= Mount Moriah (New Hampshire) =

Mountain in the state of New Hampshire

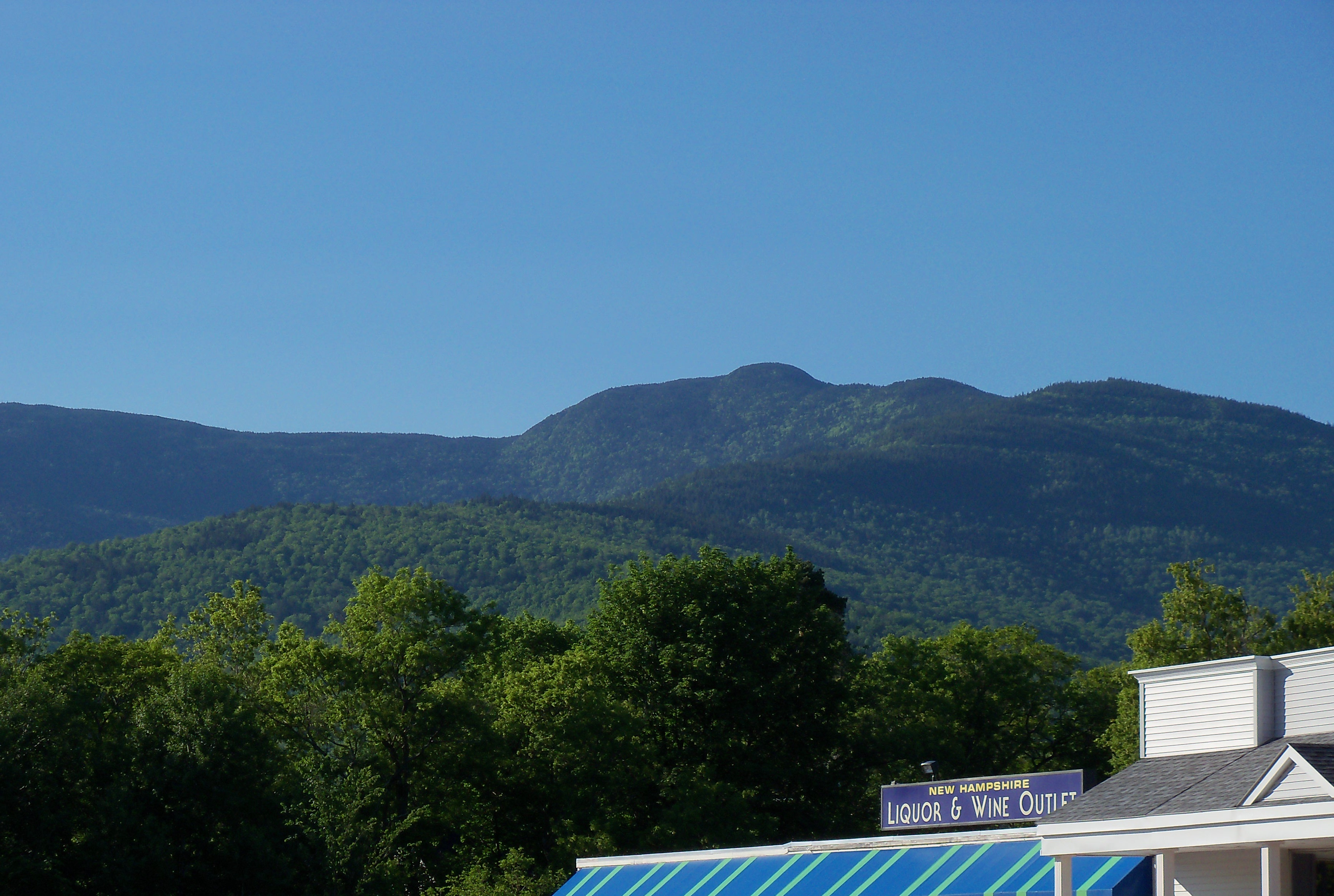
- Mt. Moriah (center) from Gorham

Highest point
- Elevation: 4,049 ft (1,234 m)
- Prominence: 922 ft (281 m)
- Parent peak: North Carter Mountain
- Listing: AMC New England Hundred Highest
- Coordinates: 44°20′25″N 71°07′53″W

Geography
- Location within New Hampshire
- Location: Coös County, N.H., U.S.
- Parent range: Carter-Moriah Range
- Topo map: USGS Carter Dome

Mount Moriah is a mountain located in Coos County, New Hampshire. The mountain is part of the Carter-Moriah Range of the White Mountains, which runs along the northern east side of Pinkham Notch. The summit is approximately 5 miles (8 km) southeast of the center of the town of Gorham. Mount Moriah is flanked to the northeast by Middle Moriah Mountain and to the southwest by Imp Mountain. The summit is located on the Appalachian Trail and affords views in all directions.

== Climate ==
Climate data for Mount Moriah (NH) 44.3345 N, 71.1262 W, Elevation: 3,684 ft (1,123 m) (1991–2020 normals)
Month	Jan	Feb	Mar	Apr	May	Jun	Jul	Aug	Sep	Oct	Nov	Dec	Year
Mean daily maximum °F (°C)	19.7 (−6.8)	22.2 (−5.4)	28.9 (−1.7)	41.6 (5.3)	54.7 (12.6)	63.0 (17.2)	67.7 (19.8)	66.4 (19.1)	60.7 (15.9)	48.3 (9.1)	35.6 (2.0)	25.3 (−3.7)	44.5 (7.0)
Daily mean °F (°C)	11.9 (−11.2)	13.6 (−10.2)	20.1 (−6.6)	32.6 (0.3)	45.5 (7.5)	54.4 (12.4)	59.3 (15.2)	58.1 (14.5)	52.0 (11.1)	40.2 (4.6)	28.7 (−1.8)	18.4 (−7.6)	36.2 (2.4)
Mean daily minimum °F (°C)	4.0 (−15.6)	5.0 (−15.0)	11.3 (−11.5)	23.6 (−4.7)	36.3 (2.4)	45.7 (7.6)	50.9 (10.5)	49.7 (9.8)	43.3 (6.3)	32.1 (0.1)	21.9 (−5.6)	11.6 (−11.3)	28.0 (−2.3)
Average precipitation inches (mm)	4.69 (119)	4.23 (107)	4.70 (119)	5.75 (146)	5.58 (142)	6.16 (156)	5.88 (149)	4.98 (126)	4.85 (123)	7.64 (194)	5.68 (144)	5.83 (148)	65.97 (1,673)
Source: PRISM Climate Group

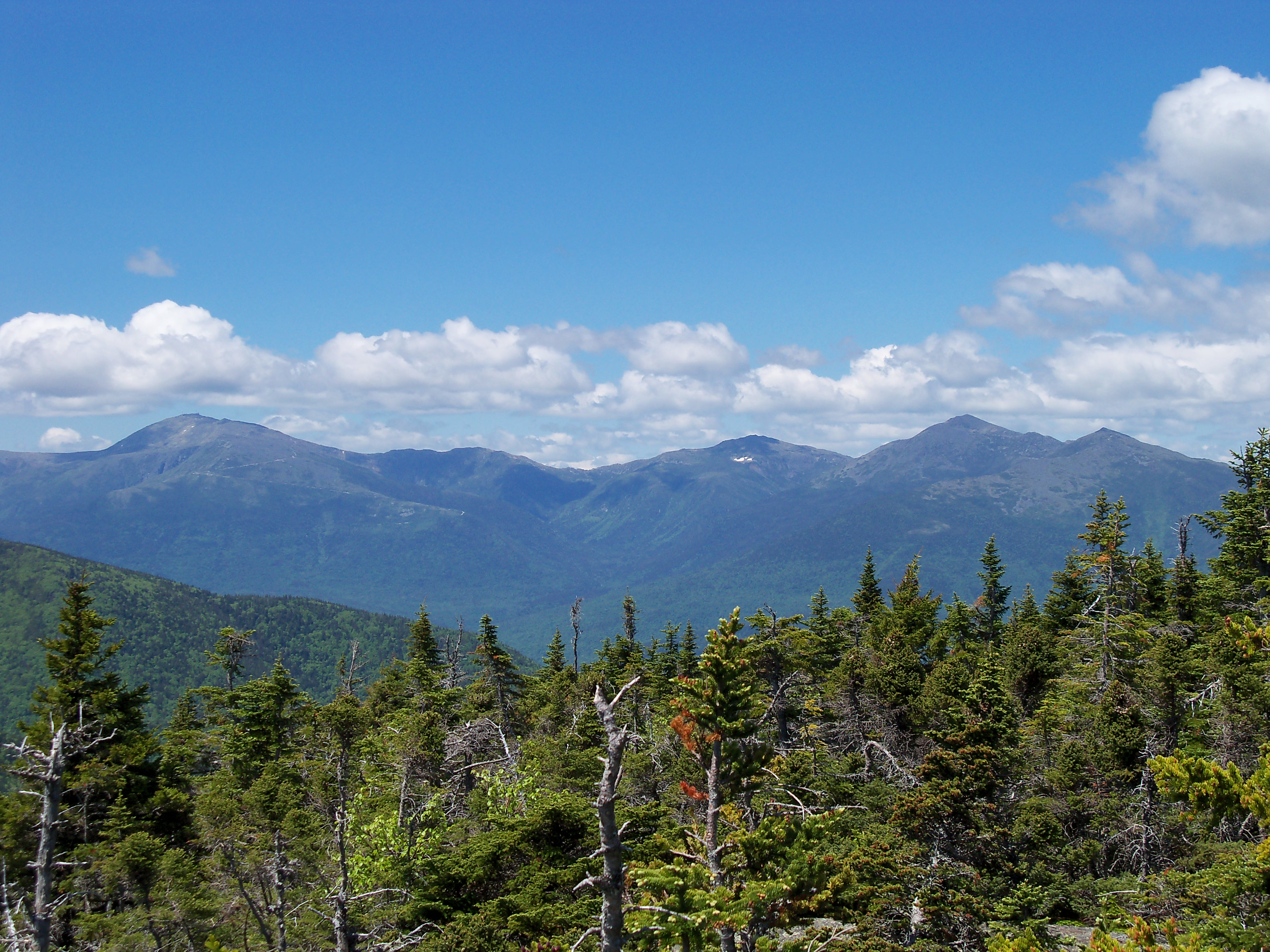
Presidential Range as seen from the summit of Mount Moriah

== See also ==
- List of mountains in New Hampshire
- White Mountain National Forest
