= Shelburne Moriah Mountain =

Mountain in New Hampshire, United States

Highest point
- Elevation: 1,138 m (3,734 ft)
- Prominence: 136 m (446 ft)
- Coordinates: 44°21′10″N 071°05′55″W

Geography
- Location: Coös County, New Hampshire, U.S.
- Parent range: Carter-Moriah Range
- Topo map: USGS Wild River

Shelburne Moriah Mountain is a mountain located in Coos County, New Hampshire. The mountain is part of the Carter-Moriah Range of the White Mountains, which runs along the northern east side of Pinkham Notch. Shelburne Moriah is flanked to the southwest by Middle Moriah Mountain. It is the northernmost Moriah Range summit along the Appalachian Trail, which crosses the Androscoggin River at Shelburne, New Hampshire, and continues north into the Mahoosuc Range.

== See also ==
- List of mountains in New Hampshire
- White Mountain National Forest
