= Middle Moriah Mountain =

Mountain in the state of New Hampshire

Highest point
- Elevation: 3,755 ft (1,145 m)
- Prominence: 155 ft (47 m)
- Coordinates: 44°20′59″N 71°07′16″W

Geography
- Location: Coös County, New Hampshire, U.S.
- Parent range: Carter-Moriah Range
- Topo map: USGS Wild River

Middle Moriah Mountain is a mountain located in Coos County, New Hampshire. The mountain is part of the Carter-Moriah Range of the White Mountains, which runs along the northern east side of Pinkham Notch. Middle Moriah is flanked to the northeast by Shelburne Moriah Mountain, and to the southwest by Mount Moriah.

== See also ==
- List of mountains in New Hampshire
- White Mountain National Forest
