= Carter-Moriah Range =

Part of the White Mountains of New Hampshire

Coordinates: 44°18′47″N 071°09′52″W

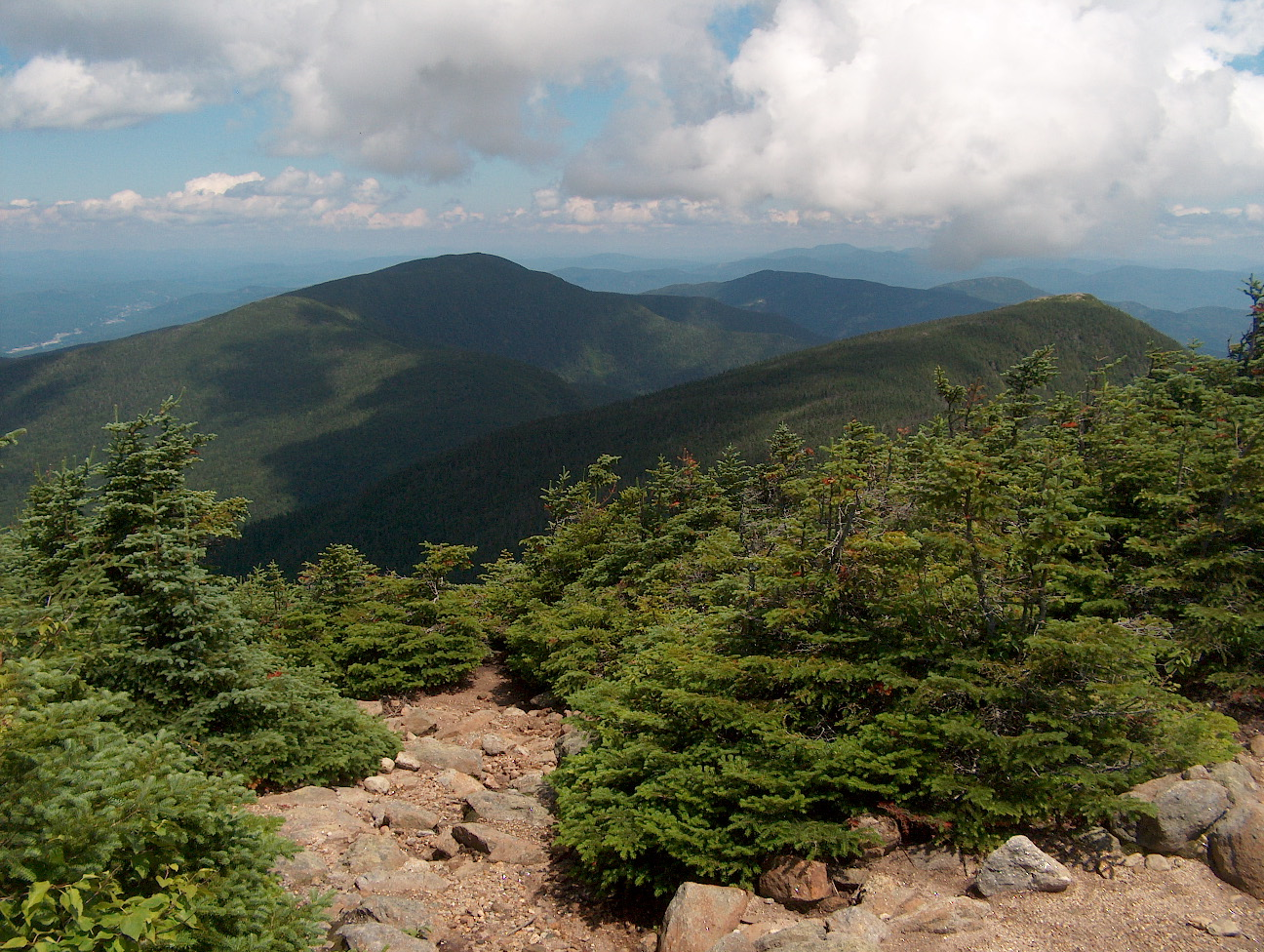
View of the range looking north from Carter Dome. Left: Middle Carter; middle (distance): Moriah; right: Hight

The Carter-Moriah Range of mountains is located in the White Mountains, in Coös County, New Hampshire. The range forms the northern east side of Pinkham Notch, opposite the northern Presidential Range. The range is also referred to as the Carter Range.

== Summits ==
From north to south:

| • Shelburne Moriah Mountain | (1,138 m / 3,735 ft) |
| • Middle Moriah Mountain | (1,145 m / 3,755 ft) |
| • Mount Moriah | (1,234 m / 4,049 ft) * |
| • Imp Mountain | (1,134 m / 3,720 ft) |
| • North Carter Mountain | (1,381 m / 4,530 ft) |
| • Middle Carter Mountain | (1,741 m / 4,600 ft) * |
| • South Carter Mountain | (1,741 m / 4,420 ft) * |
| • Mount Hight | (1,425 m / 4,675 ft) |
| • Carter Dome | (1,473 m / 4,832 ft) * |

While not strictly part of the range, Wildcat Mountain (1,345 m / 4,422 ft) * stands southwest of Carter Dome, facing it across Carter Notch.

The summits marked with an asterisk (*) are included on the Appalachian Mountain Club's peak-bagging list of "four-thousand footers" in New Hampshire; the others are excluded, in some cases because of insufficient elevation and in others because of insufficient topographic prominence.

== Watersheds ==
The Carter-Moriah Range drains to the northwest into the Peabody River and to the southeast into the Wild River. Both flow into the Androscoggin River—at Gorham, New Hampshire and Gilead, Maine respectively—and thence into the Atlantic Ocean on the coast of Maine.

== See also ==
- List of mountains in New Hampshire
- White Mountain National Forest
