= Mount Weetamoo =

Mountain in Campton, New Hampshire

Highest point
- Elevation: 2,520 ft (770 m)https://www.peakbagger.com/peak.aspx?pid=27082

Naming
- Etymology: Weetamoo, a leader of the Pocasset nation
- Pronunciation: wee-TAH-moo

Geography
- Location: New Hampshire, United States
- Country: United States
- State: New Hampshire
- Region: White Mountains
- District: Grafton County
- Subdivision: Eastern
- Settlement: Campton
- Parent range: Sandwich Range
- Topo map: https://www.topozone.com/new-hampshire/grafton-nh/summit/mount-weetamoo/

Mount Weetamoo is a 2,520-foot (770 m) mountain in the Sandwich Range of Grafton County, New Hampshire, United States. Its summit is located in the town of Campton.

== Geography ==
Mount Weetamoo's peak is in Campton, New Hampshire. It has one subpeak, Mount Weetamoo - East Peak. The subpeak's highest point is at 2,438 feet (743 m) in elevation. The Hall Ponds are located at the eastern base of Mount Weetamoo. Campton Mountain is located immediately southwest of Mount Weetamoo's peak.

== Hall Ponds ==
The Hall Ponds are a series of three small ponds at the base of Mount Weetamoo. Upper Hall Pond is located along Upper Hall Pond Road, Lower Hall Pond is located along the Hall Pond Connector Snowmobile Trail, and the central Hall Pond is located along the same trail. The ponds drain to the south into a tributary of the Beebe River, a west-flowing tributary of the Pemigewasset River.
