= Wildcat Mountain (New Hampshire) =

Mountain in New Hampshire, United States

Wildcat Mountain A
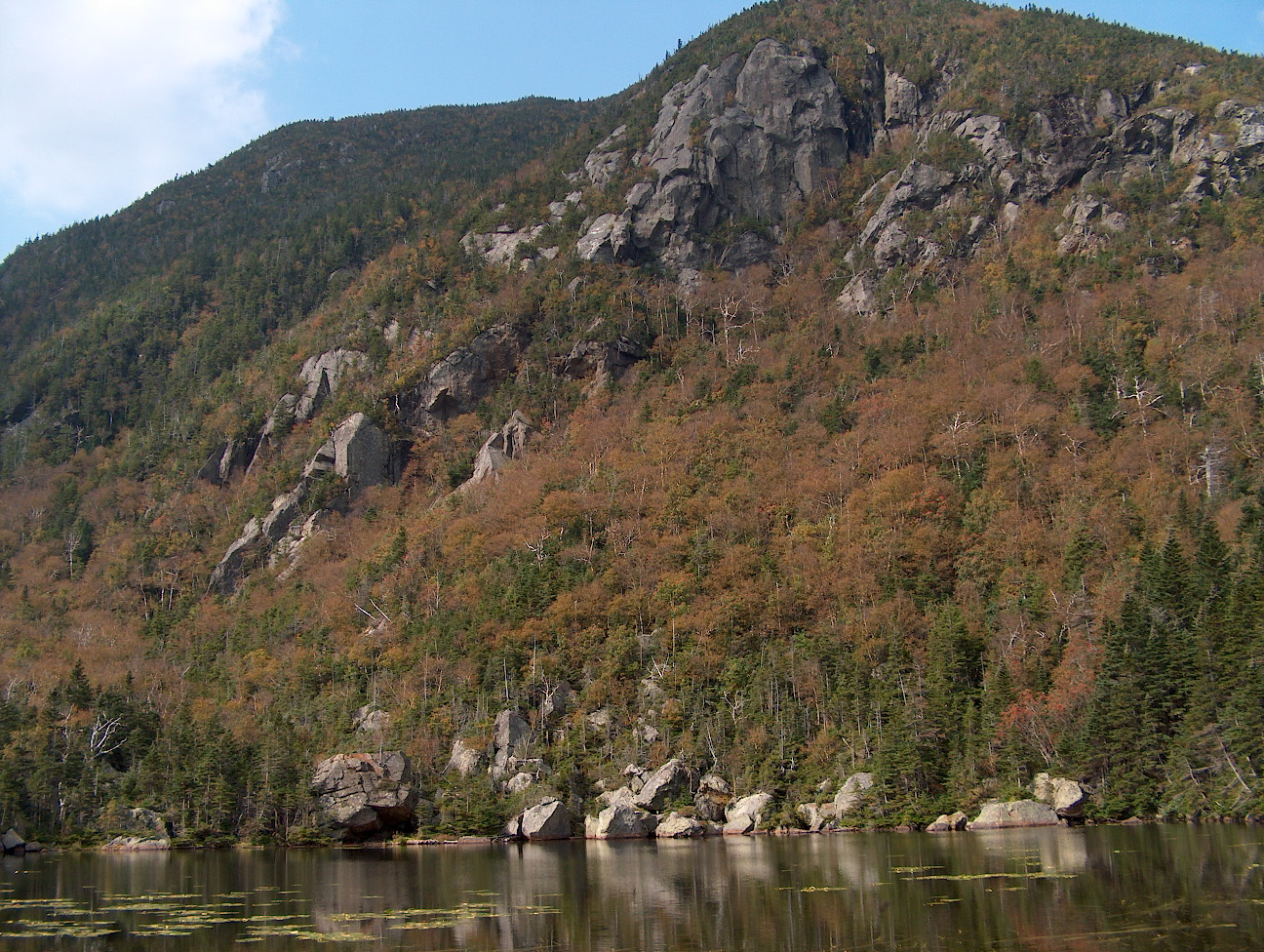
- Wildcat A rises over Carter Notch

Highest point
- Elevation: 4,422 ft (1,348 m)
- Prominence: 1,034 ft (315 m)
- Listing: White Mountain 4,000-footers
- Coordinates: 44°15′32″N 71°12′05″W

Geography
- Location: Coös County, New Hampshire, U.S.
- Parent range: Carter-Moriah Range
- Topo map: USGS Carter Dome

Wildcat Mountain D

Highest point
- Elevation: 4,062 ft (1,238 m)
- Prominence: 287 ft (87 m)
- Listing: White Mountain 4,000-footers

Climbing
- Easiest route: Via Wildcat Mountain Ski Area gondola lift

Wildcat Mountain is a mountain located in Coos County, northern New Hampshire, United States. The mountain is part of the Carter-Moriah Range of the White Mountains, on the east side of Pinkham Notch. Wildcat Mountain faces Carter Dome across Carter Notch to the northeast, and Mount Washington across Pinkham Notch to the west.

Wildcat Mountain has five summits — A, B, C, D, and E — along Wildcat Ridge, which curves two miles (3.2 km) to the south and west. Both A, at 4,422 feet (1,348 m), and D, at 4,062 feet (1,238 m), are considered "four-thousand footers". B, with an elevation of 4,305 feet (1,312 m), and C, at 4,285 feet (1,306 m), lack the topographic prominence to be considered more than subpeaks of Wildcat A. Likewise, the E peak, at 4,046 feet (1,233 m), is considered to be a subpeak of the D peak (the E peak was formerly believed to be the higher of the two, and used to appear on the official list of four-thousand footers, but current topographic maps reveal the D peak to be the higher summit).

The Appalachian Trail, which extends over 2,170 miles (3,490 km) from Georgia to Maine, climbs up from the Appalachian Mountain Club's Joe Dodge Lodge in Pinkham Notch and traverses the summits of the Wildcat Ridge, continuing on to Carter Dome.

The Wildcat Mountain Ski Area is one of the best-known alpine skiing resorts in New England, with lifts from the base on NH Route 16 in Pinkham Notch 2,112 ft (644 m) up to the D summit. The area has 49 trails on 225 acres (0.91 km^{2}), including Polecat Trail—the longest ski trail in New Hampshire. The Wildcat Valley Trail, an ungroomed cross-country ski trail, leads from the summit down to Jackson, New Hampshire, dropping 3,240 ft (990 m) in 11.1 miles (17.9 km). Cut in 1972, it is one of the best-known routes in the extensive trail system maintained by the Jackson Ski Touring Foundation.

== Climate ==
Climate data for Wildcat Mountain 44.2558 N, 71.1981 W, Elevation: 4,016 ft (1,224 m) (1991–2020 normals)
| Month | Jan | Feb | Mar | Apr | May | Jun | Jul | Aug | Sep | Oct | Nov | Dec | Year |
|---|---|---|---|---|---|---|---|---|---|---|---|---|---|
| Mean daily maximum °F (°C) | 19.3 (−7.1) | 21.2 (−6.0) | 27.9 (−2.3) | 39.6 (4.2) | 52.7 (11.5) | 60.9 (16.1) | 65.6 (18.7) | 64.3 (17.9) | 58.5 (14.7) | 46.2 (7.9) | 34.3 (1.3) | 24.8 (−4.0) | 42.9 (6.1) |
| Daily mean °F (°C) | 11.4 (−11.4) | 12.8 (−10.7) | 19.3 (−7.1) | 31.2 (−0.4) | 44.1 (6.7) | 53.0 (11.7) | 57.9 (14.4) | 56.7 (13.7) | 50.5 (10.3) | 38.7 (3.7) | 27.5 (−2.5) | 17.7 (−7.9) | 35.1 (1.7) |
| Mean daily minimum °F (°C) | 3.5 (−15.8) | 4.4 (−15.3) | 10.7 (−11.8) | 22.7 (−5.2) | 35.6 (2.0) | 45.1 (7.3) | 50.3 (10.2) | 49.0 (9.4) | 42.5 (5.8) | 31.3 (−0.4) | 20.8 (−6.2) | 10.6 (−11.9) | 27.2 (−2.7) |
| Average precipitation inches (mm) | 5.36 (136) | 4.63 (118) | 5.53 (140) | 6.65 (169) | 6.19 (157) | 6.94 (176) | 6.78 (172) | 5.81 (148) | 5.84 (148) | 9.12 (232) | 6.91 (176) | 6.54 (166) | 76.3 (1,938) |
Source: PRISM Climate Group

== See also ==
- List of mountains in New Hampshire
- Four-thousand footers
- White Mountain National Forest
