= Carter Notch =

Mountain pass in New Hampshire, US

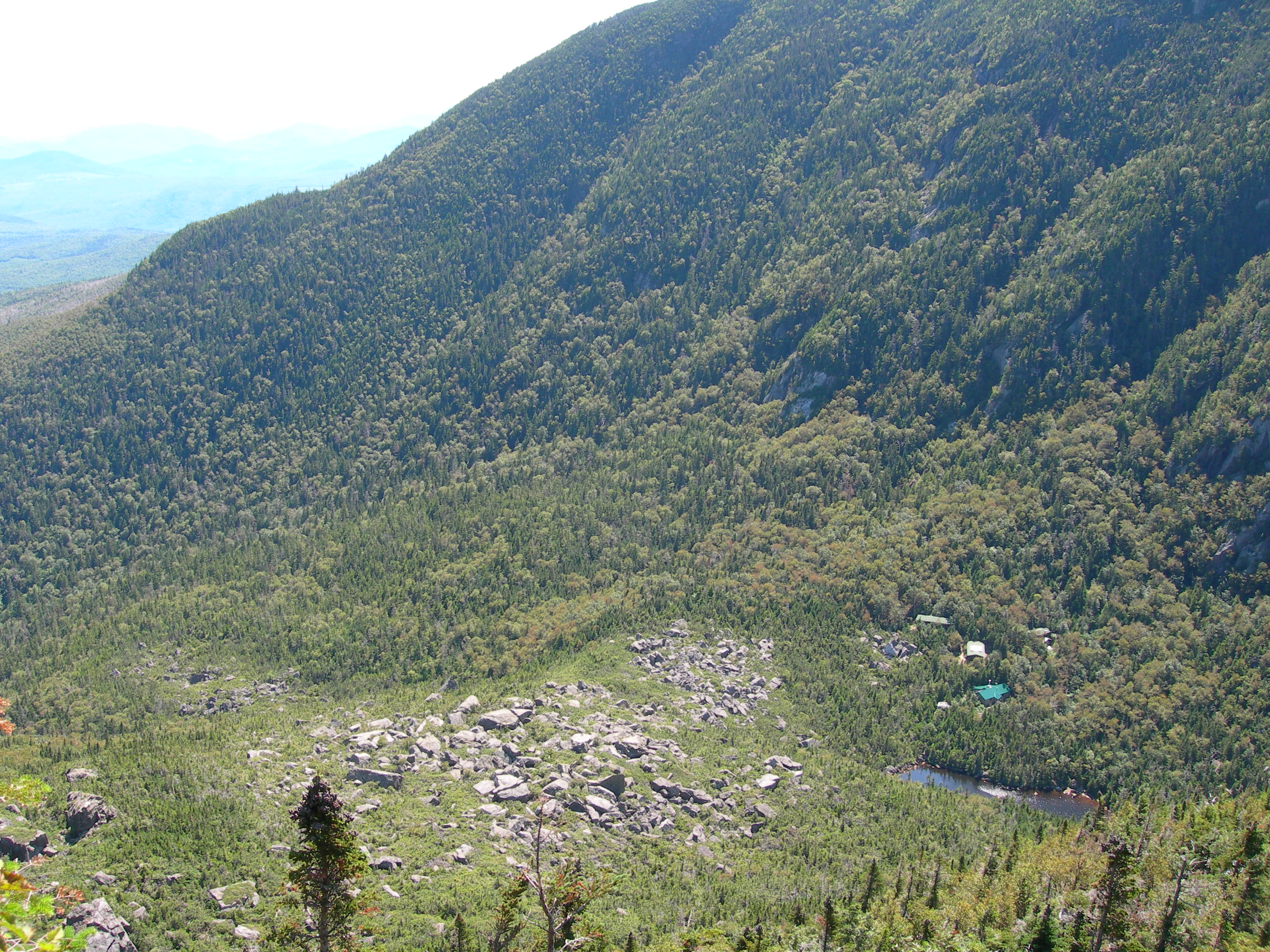
- The Ramparts in Carter Notch, seen looking SW from the shoulder of Carter Dome
- Interactive map of Carter Notch
- Elevation: 3,396 ft (1,035 m)
- Traversed by: hiking trails

Third Approach
- Location: Bean's Purchase, Coos County, New Hampshire, United States
- Range: White Mountains
- Coordinates: 44°15′42″N 071°11′43″W
- Topo map: USGS Carter Dome

Carter Notch is a high mountain pass through the White Mountains of New Hampshire. It is traversed only by hiking trails. The notch is located in the Carter-Moriah Range within the White Mountain National Forest, in Bean's Purchase, Coos County, New Hampshire. It is bordered to the west by Wildcat Mountain (4,422 ft or 1,348 m), and to the east by Carter Dome (4,832 ft or 1,473 m). There are two small ponds in the notch, the Carter Lakes, as well as a large boulder field named The Ramparts. The ponds drain south through the talus barrier formed by The Ramparts. The height of land is to the north. To the north, the notch drains via Nineteenmile Brook, which flows into the Peabody River. Drainage to the south is into the Wildcat River, which flows into the Saco River.

Located in the notch is the Appalachian Mountain Club's Carter Notch Hut (el. 3,288 ft or 1,000 m). The notch is accessible in winter by snowshoes or backcountry skis.

== See also ==
- List of mountain passes in New Hampshire
