= South Carter Mountain =

Mountain in New Hampshire, United States

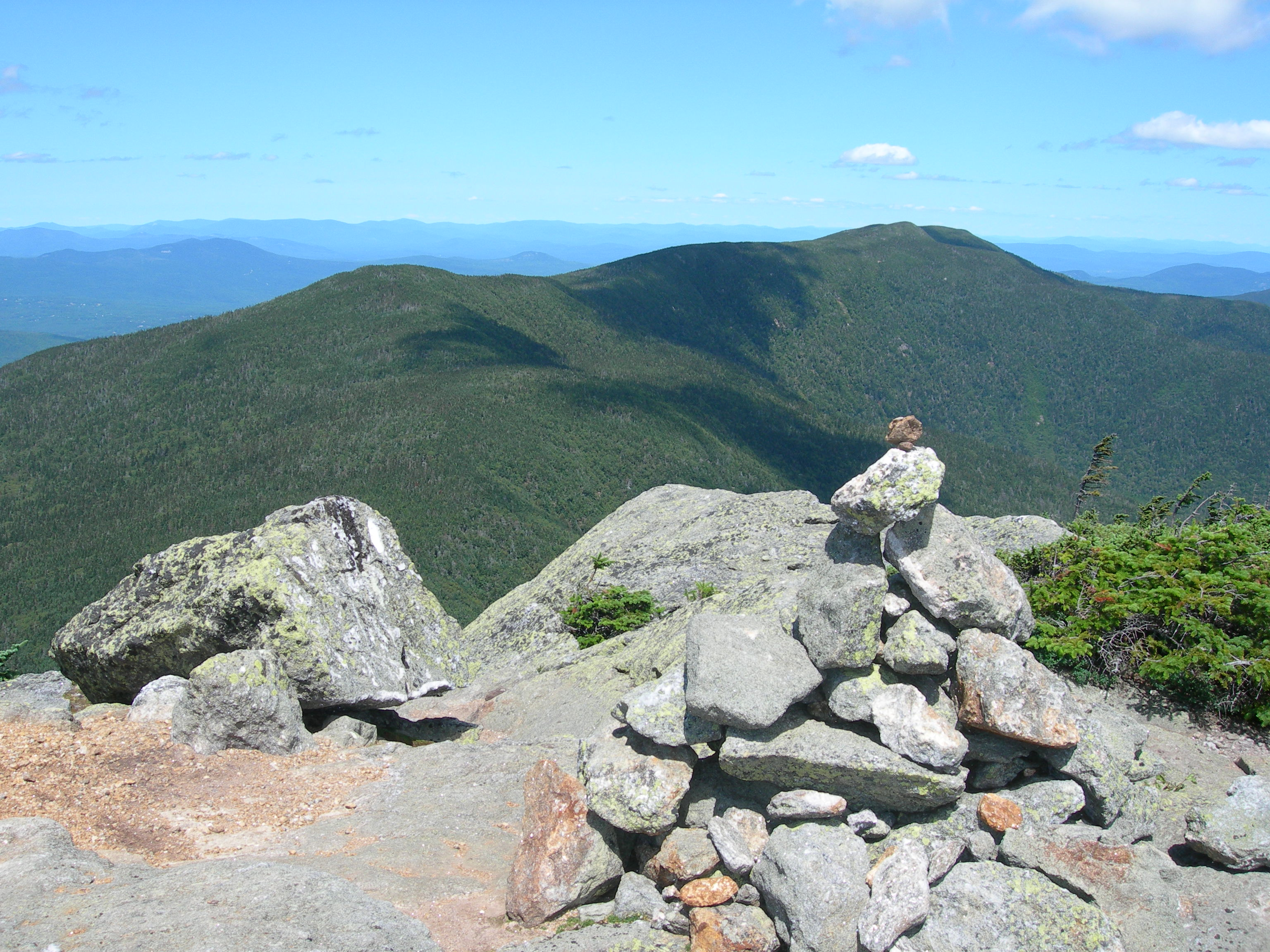
- South Carter Mountain (left) seen from Mt. Hight

Highest point
- Elevation: 4,420 ft (1,350 m)
- Prominence: 230 ft (70 m)
- Listing: White Mountain 4000-Footers
- Coordinates: 44°17′23″N 071°10′34″W

Geography
- Location: Coös County, New Hampshire, U.S.
- Parent range: Carter-Moriah Range
- Topo map: USGS Carter Dome

South Carter Mountain is a mountain located in Coos County, New Hampshire. The mountain is part of the Carter-Moriah Range of the White Mountains, which runs along the northern east side of Pinkham Notch. South Carter is flanked to the northeast by Middle Carter Mountain and to the southeast Mount Hight.

== See also ==
- List of mountains in New Hampshire
- Four-thousand footers
- White Mountain National Forest
