= List of mountain passes in New Hampshire =

This is a list of mountain passes — generally called notches — in New Hampshire in the United States.

== White Mountains ==
Name	GNIS Feature ID	Location
Bear Notch	871466	Bartlett
Bunnell Notch	865863	Kilkenny
Carlton Notch	866001	Randolph
Carrigain Notch	871624	between Lincoln and Livermore
Carter Notch	871634	Bean's Purchase
Crawford Notch	871738	Hart's Location
Dickey Notch	871786	Thornton
Edmands Col	871849	Thompson and Meserve's Purchase
Franconia Notch	871907	Franconia
Hancock Notch	872003	Lincoln and Livermore
Hunters Pass	867682	Randolph
Jefferson Notch	872099	Thompson and Meserve's Purchase
Kancamagus Pass	872120	between Lincoln and Conway
Kinsman Notch	872141	Woodstock
Livermore Pass	872203	Livermore
Lost Pass	872220	Waterville Valley
Mad River Notch	872240	between Lincoln and Livermore
Oliverian Notch	872433	between Warren and Benton
Perkins Notch	872488	Bean's Purchase
Pinkham Notch	872508	Pinkham's Grant
Sandwich Notch	872624	Sandwich
Thornton Gap	872811	between Thornton and Waterville Valley
Trident Pass	872830	Success
Willard Notch	870906	Kilkenny
Zealand Notch	872973	between Bethlehem and Lincoln
Zeta Pass	872978	Bean's Purchase

== Northern New Hampshire ==
Name	GNIS Feature ID	Location
Cleveland Notch	866211	Columbia
Cranberry Bog Notch	866379	Odell
Cree Notch	866394	Columbia
Dixville Notch	866591	Dixville township
Gadwah Notch	867007	Columbia
Gore Notch	867132	Stratford
Kelsey Notch	867834	Dixville township
Moran Notch	868557	Columbia
Stratford Notch	870222	Stratford
Tabor Notch	870324	Pittsburg

== Southern New Hampshire ==
Name	GNIS Feature ID	Location
Barn Door Gap	865379	Strafford
Spofford Gap	870093	between Sharon and Temple
