= Carter Dome =

Mountain in New Hampshire, United States

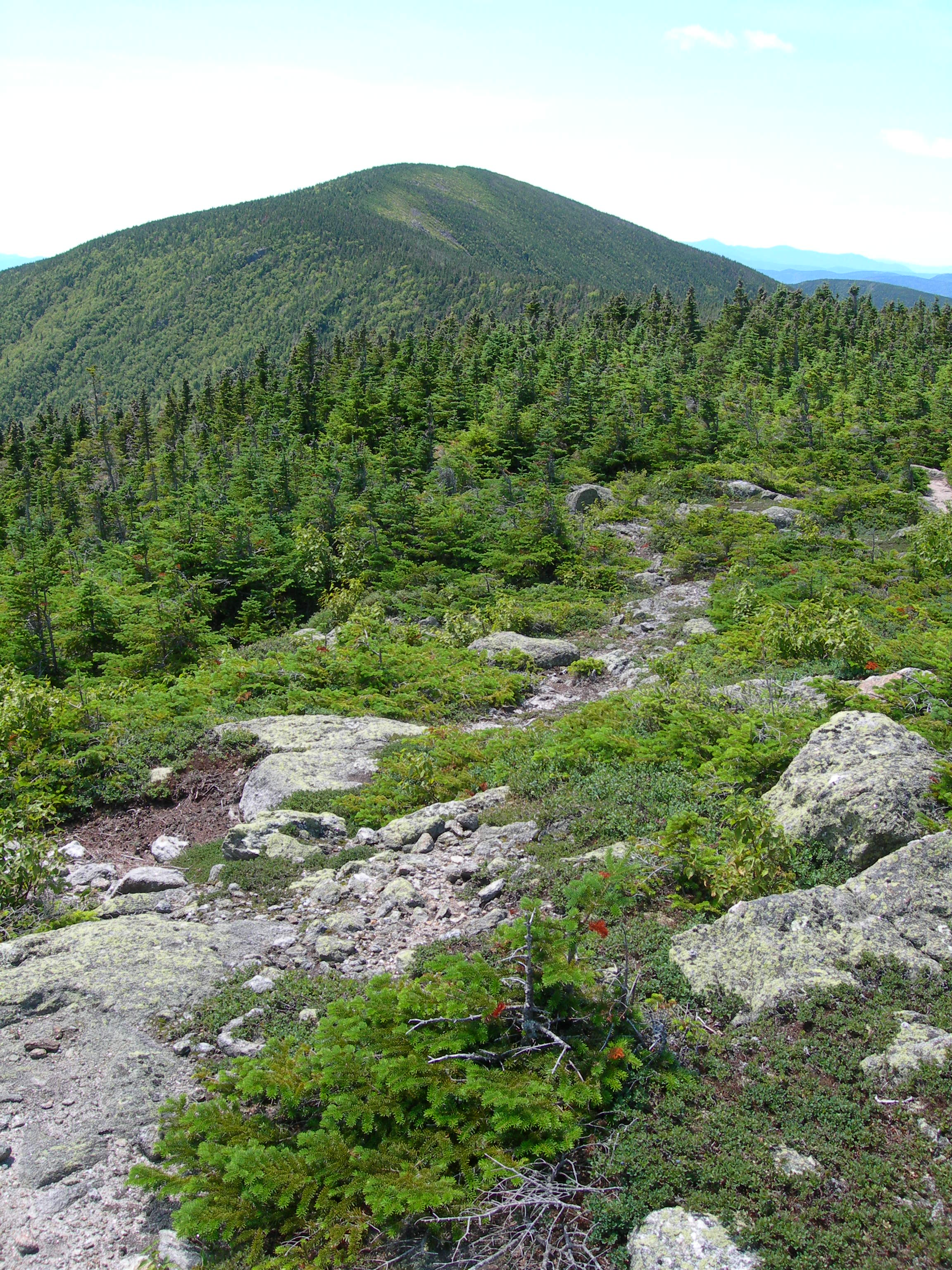
- Carter Dome seen from Mt. Hight

Highest point
- Elevation: 4,826 ft (1,471 m)
- Prominence: 2,821 ft (860 m)
- Listing: White Mountain 4000-Footers; New England 50 Finest #12
- Coordinates: 44°16′2.42″N 71°10′45.34″W

Geography
- Location: Coös County, New Hampshire, U.S.
- Parent range: Carter-Moriah Range
- Topo map: USGS Carter Dome

Carter Dome, or simply The Dome, is a mountain located in Coös County, New Hampshire, U.S. It has a maximum elevation of 4,826 feet (1,471 m), placing it on the list of the state's four-thousand footers.

== Description ==
Carter Dome is part of the Carter-Moriah Range of the White Mountains of New Hampshire, which runs along the northern east side of Pinkham Notch. The mountain is flanked to the northeast by Mount Hight and to the southwest by Wildcat Mountain (across Carter Notch).

The origins of Carter Dome's name is unknown. Local folklore suggests that it was named after a hunter named Carter, while a neighboring peak is named after his hunting partner, Hight.

The mountain is ascended from the west by the Carter Dome Trail and Nineteen Mile Brook Trail, and from the east by the Black Angel Trail.

== Climate ==
Carter Dome has a humid continental climate (Köppen Dfb), closely bordering on a subarctic climate (Köppen Dfc), with September only just averaging over 10 °C (50 °F), making there four months with an average temperature of 10 °C or more. For a climate to be classified as subarctic, it must have an average temperature of at least 10 °C for one month but no more than three months, whereas humid continental climates have four or more months.

Climate data for Carter Dome 44.2652 N, 71.1739 W, Elevation: 4,472 ft (1,363 m) (1991–2020 normals)
Month	Jan	Feb	Mar	Apr	May	Jun	Jul	Aug	Sep	Oct	Nov	Dec	Year
Mean daily maximum °F (°C)	17.8 (−7.9)	19.5 (−6.9)	25.8 (−3.4)	37.6 (3.1)	50.3 (10.2)	58.8 (14.9)	63.3 (17.4)	62.1 (16.7)	56.8 (13.8)	44.8 (7.1)	31.9 (−0.1)	23.3 (−4.8)	41.0 (5.0)
Daily mean °F (°C)	10.1 (−12.2)	11.3 (−11.5)	17.9 (−7.8)	29.8 (−1.2)	43.3 (6.3)	52.6 (11.4)	57.4 (14.1)	56.1 (13.4)	50.0 (10.0)	37.8 (3.2)	25.5 (−3.6)	15.9 (−8.9)	34.0 (1.1)
Mean daily minimum °F (°C)	2.3 (−16.5)	3.2 (−16.0)	9.9 (−12.3)	21.9 (−5.6)	36.3 (2.4)	46.3 (7.9)	51.6 (10.9)	50.1 (10.1)	43.1 (6.2)	30.8 (−0.7)	19.1 (−7.2)	8.4 (−13.1)	26.9 (−2.8)
Average precipitation inches (mm)	5.60 (142)	4.78 (121)	5.66 (144)	6.90 (175)	6.44 (164)	7.13 (181)	6.95 (177)	6.00 (152)	5.98 (152)	9.46 (240)	7.10 (180)	6.74 (171)	78.74 (1,999)
Source: PRISM Climate Group

== See also ==
- List of mountains in New Hampshire
- White Mountain National Forest
