= Bartlett Haystack =

Mountain in New Hampshire, United States

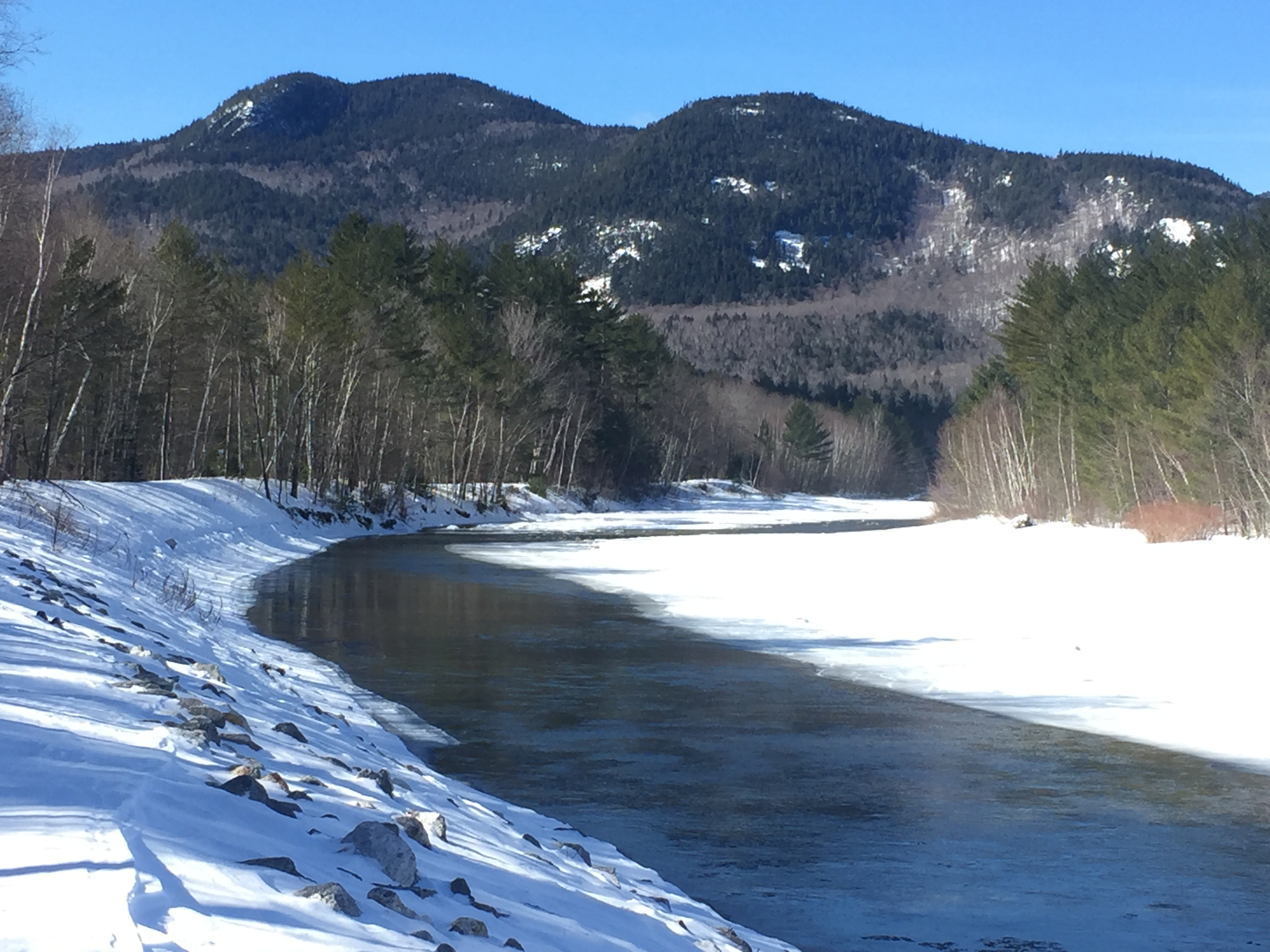
- Bartlett Haystack rising above the Saco River

Highest point
- Elevation: 2,995 feet (913 m)
- Coordinates: 44°03′07″N 71°19′37″W

Geography
- Location: Carroll County, NH
- Topo map: USGS Bartlett

Bartlett Haystack is a mountain located in Bartlett, New Hampshire. Like the town, the mountain is named after Josiah Bartlett (1729–1795), one of the signers of the Declaration of Independence and sixth Governor of New Hampshire. Bartlett Haystack is flanked to the west by Mount Tremont (3,371 ft / 1,027 m), and to the southeast across Bear Notch by Bear Mountain (3,220 ft / 981 m).

Bartlett Haystack stands within the watershed of the Saco River, which drains into the Gulf of Maine. The east side of the Haystack drains into Albany Brook, thence into the Saco River. The north side drains into Stony Brook, another tributary of the Saco. The south side drains into Douglas Brook, thence into the Swift River, a tributary of the Saco.

== See also ==
- List of mountains in New Hampshire
- White Mountain National Forest
