= Imp Mountain =

Mountain in the state of New Hampshire

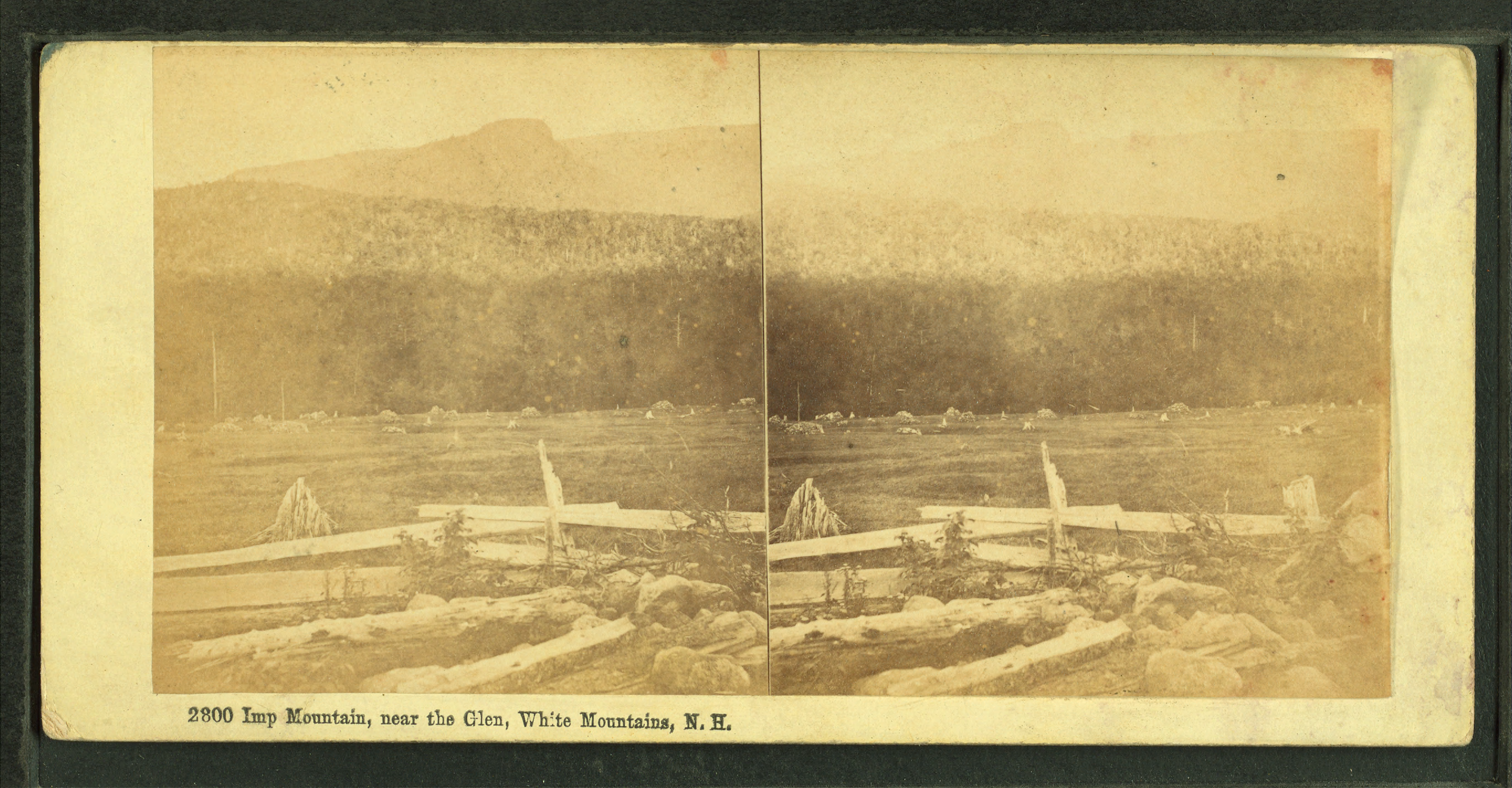
- Imp Mountain, near the Glen, White Mountains, N.H.

Highest point
- Elevation: 3720+ ft (1134+ m)
- Prominence: 100 ft (30 m)
- Coordinates: 44°19′33″N 71°09′08″W

Geography
- Location within New Hampshire
- Location: Coös County, New Hampshire, U.S.
- Parent range: Carter-Moriah Range
- Topo map: USGS Carter Dome

Imp Mountain is a mountain located in Coos County, New Hampshire. The mountain is part of the Carter-Moriah Range of the White Mountains, which runs along the northern east side of Pinkham Notch. Imp Mountain is flanked to the northeast by Mount Moriah, and to the southwest by North Carter Mountain.

== See also ==
- List of mountains in New Hampshire
- White Mountain National Forest
