= Middle Carter Mountain =

Mountain in the state of New Hampshire

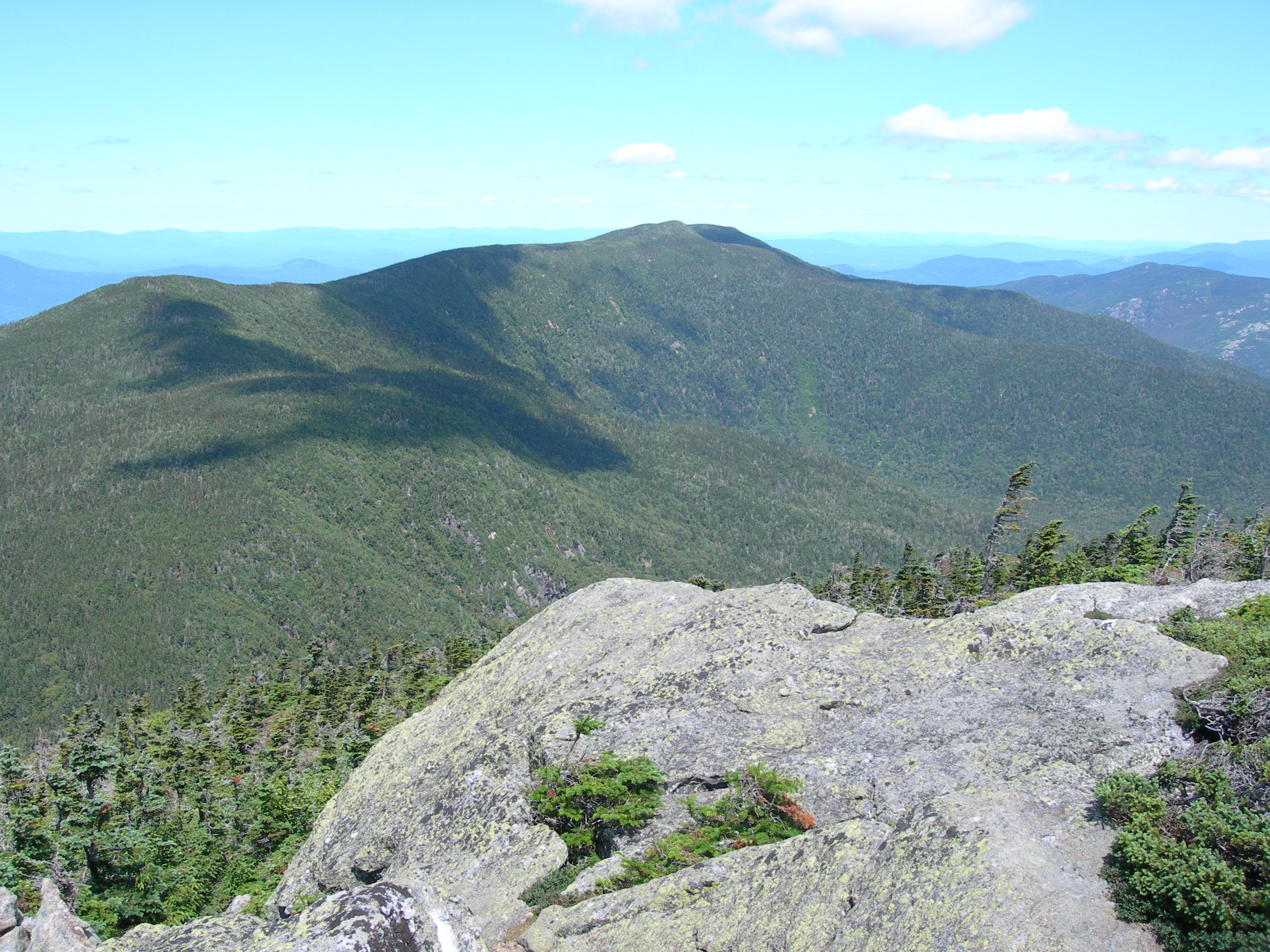
- Middle Carter Mountain (center) seen from Mt. Hight

Highest point
- Elevation: 4600+ ft (1402+ m)
- Prominence: 700 ft (210 m)
- Listing: White Mountain 4000-footers
- Coordinates: 44°18′11″N 71°10′02″W

Geography
- Location: Coös County, New Hampshire, U.S.
- Parent range: Carter-Moriah Range
- Topo map: USGS Carter Dome

Middle Carter Mountain is a mountain located in Coos County, New Hampshire. The mountain is part of the Carter-Moriah Range of the White Mountains, which runs along the northern east side of Pinkham Notch. Middle Carter is flanked to the north by North Carter Mountain and to the southwest by South Carter Mountain. The summit of Middle Carter is wooded, but there are views from the ridgecrest not far from the summit.

== Climate ==
Climate data for Middle Carter Mountain 44.3105 N, 71.1688 W, Elevation: 4,370 ft (1,332 m) (1991–2020 normals)
Month	Jan	Feb	Mar	Apr	May	Jun	Jul	Aug	Sep	Oct	Nov	Dec	Year
Mean daily maximum °F (°C)	18.0 (−7.8)	19.8 (−6.8)	26.2 (−3.2)	38.3 (3.5)	51.1 (10.6)	59.4 (15.2)	64.1 (17.8)	62.8 (17.1)	57.5 (14.2)	45.4 (7.4)	32.4 (0.2)	23.5 (−4.7)	41.5 (5.3)
Daily mean °F (°C)	10.2 (−12.1)	11.6 (−11.3)	18.2 (−7.7)	30.3 (−0.9)	43.8 (6.6)	52.9 (11.6)	57.8 (14.3)	56.5 (13.6)	50.4 (10.2)	38.2 (3.4)	26.0 (−3.3)	16.2 (−8.8)	34.3 (1.3)
Mean daily minimum °F (°C)	2.4 (−16.4)	3.4 (−15.9)	10.3 (−12.1)	22.3 (−5.4)	36.5 (2.5)	46.4 (8.0)	51.6 (10.9)	50.3 (10.2)	43.3 (6.3)	31.1 (−0.5)	19.5 (−6.9)	8.8 (−12.9)	27.2 (−2.7)
Average precipitation inches (mm)	5.96 (151)	4.85 (123)	5.89 (150)	7.29 (185)	6.57 (167)	7.28 (185)	6.99 (178)	5.96 (151)	6.05 (154)	9.60 (244)	7.46 (189)	7.07 (180)	80.97 (2,057)
Source: PRISM Climate Group

== See also ==
- List of mountains in New Hampshire
- Four-thousand footers
- White Mountain National Forest
