= Mount Tremont =

Mountain in New Hampshire, United States

Coordinates: 44.0535°N 71.3569°W

Mt. Tremont (center of photo) as seen from the north. Saco River valley is in right front; Sawyer River valley is in the right back of photo.

Mount Tremont, elevation 3,371 feet (1,027 m), is a mountain in Carroll and Grafton counties in the White Mountains of New Hampshire. It stands southwest of the town of Bartlett and directly south of Crawford Notch. It is flanked to the east by Bartlett Haystack mountain, to the northwest by the Sawyer River valley, and to the northeast by the Saco River valley. The mountain is crossed by the Brunel and Mount Tremont trails.
