= North Carter Mountain =

Mountain in New Hampshire, United States

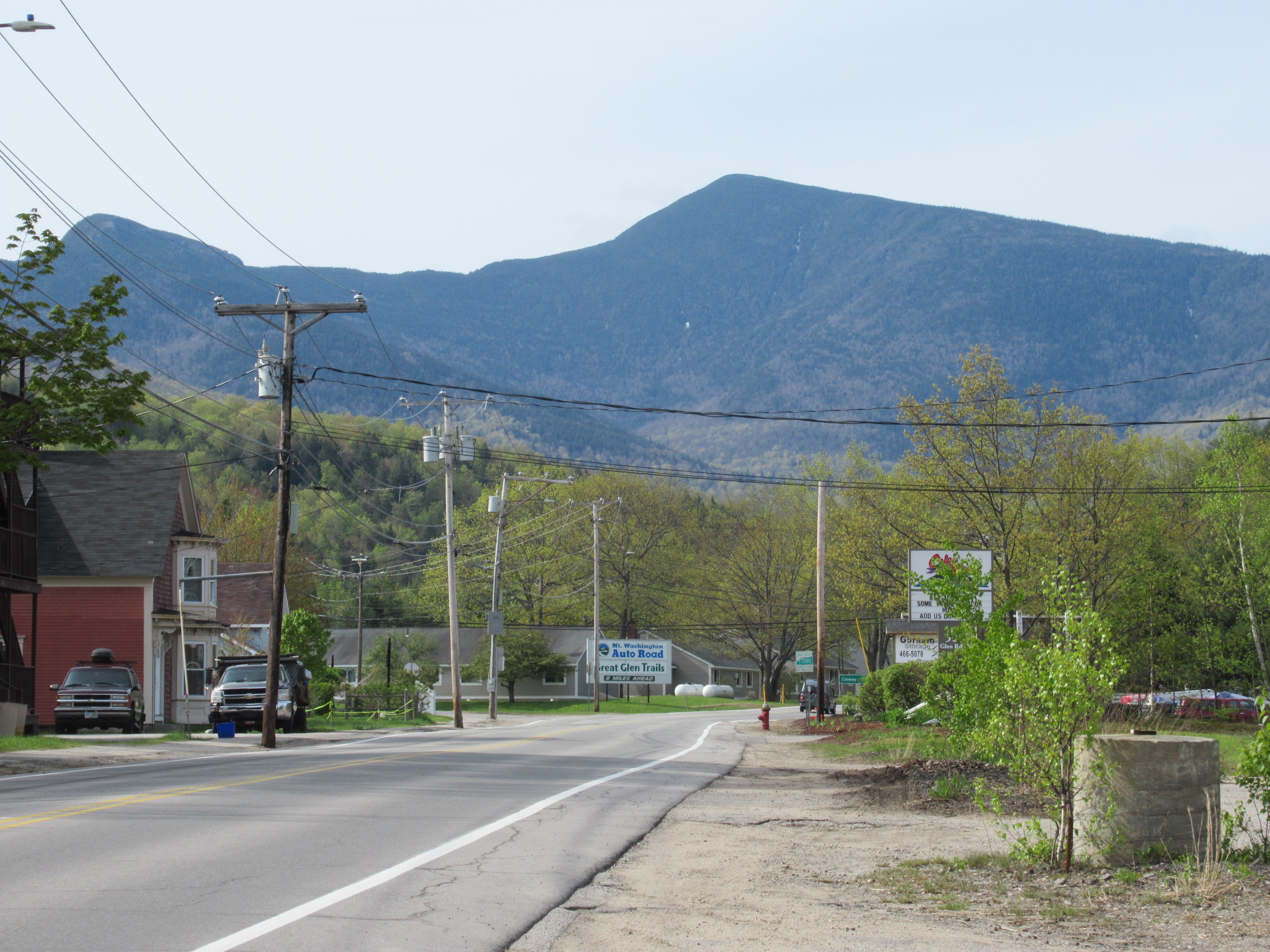
- North Carter as seen from NH 16 in Gorham, NH

Highest point
- Elevation: 4,530 ft (1,380 m)
- Prominence: 60 ft (18 m)
- Coordinates: 44°18′47″N 071°09′52″W

Geography
- Location: Coös County, New Hampshire, U.S.
- Parent range: Carter-Moriah Range
- Topo map: USGS Carter Dome

North Carter Mountain is a mountain located in Coos County, New Hampshire, United States. The mountain is part of the Carter-Moriah Range of the White Mountains, which runs along the northern east side of Pinkham Notch. North Carter is flanked to the northeast by Imp Mountain, and to the southwest by Middle Carter Mountain.

Although well over 4,000 feet (1,200 m) in height, the Appalachian Mountain Club does not consider North Carter a "four-thousand footer" because the col on the ridge from Middle Carter only descends 60 feet (18 m), making it a secondary summit of that peak.

== See also ==
- List of mountains of New Hampshire
- Four-thousand footers
- White Mountain National Forest
