= Pocasset =

Pocasset (derived from Wampanoag for at the small cove) may refer to a location in the United States:

== Places ==
- Pocasset, Massachusetts, a Census-Designated place in Bourne, Massachusetts
- Pocasset, Oklahoma
- Pocasset village, a historical community of Wampanoag people in Massachusetts and Rhode Island

== Organizations ==
- Pocasset Wampanoag Tribe of Massachusetts and Rhode Island, an unrecognized organization of individuals identifying as Wampanoag descendants
- Pocasset Wampanoag Tribe of the Pokanoket Nation, an unrecognized tribe in Cranston, Rhode Island
