= Rocky Gorge (New Hampshire) =

Waterfall

Coordinates: 44°0′15″N 71°16′43″W

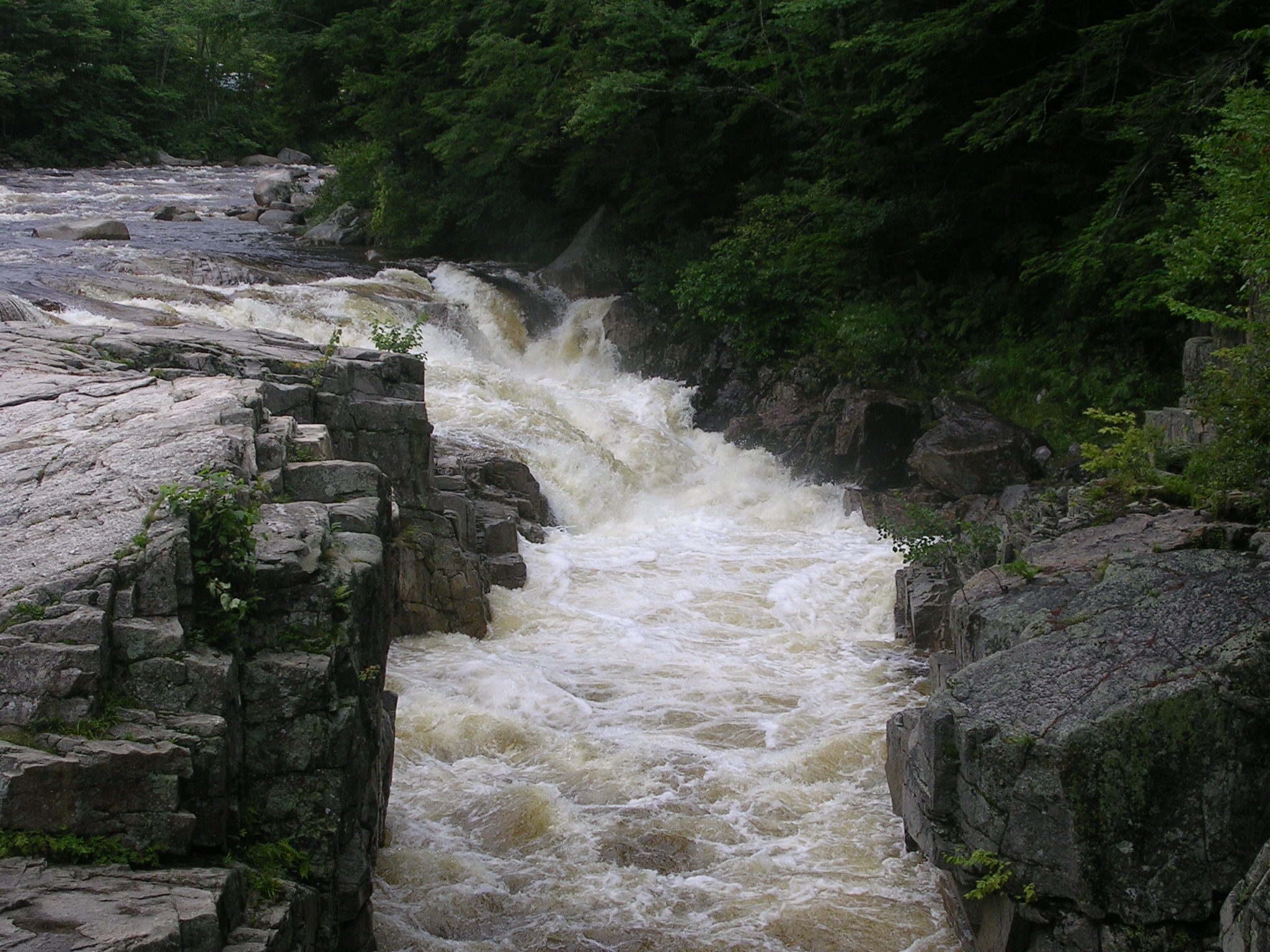
Rocky Gorge on the Swift River

Rocky Gorge is a waterfall and the name of a scenic and picnic area along the Swift River in the White Mountain National Forest of New Hampshire, United States, next to the Kancamagus Highway. Swimming is not permitted in the falls at Rocky Gorge because of a near-fatal accident involving Dorothy Sparks in 1942. At least two other non-fatal accidents, each involving two people, have occurred since 1942.
