= Mount Rosebrook =

Mountain in United States of America

Coordinates: 44°14′35″N 71°28′14″W

The Rosebrook Range as seen from Middle Sugarloaf. From left foreground to right background are Mount Oscar, Mount Rosebrook, and Mount Stickney. Mount Tom and Mount Field are in the right background.

Mount Rosebrook is a mountain in New Hampshire's White Mountains. It is part of the Bretton Woods Ski Resort, rising to the southwest across U.S. Route 302 from the Mount Washington Hotel. The elevation of the summit is 3,004 feet (916 m). It is on the crest of the Rosebrook Mountains, with 2,746-foot (837 m) Mount Oscar to the northwest and 3,043-foot (928 m) Mount Stickney to the southeast.
