= Pinkham Notch =

Mountain pass in New Hampshire

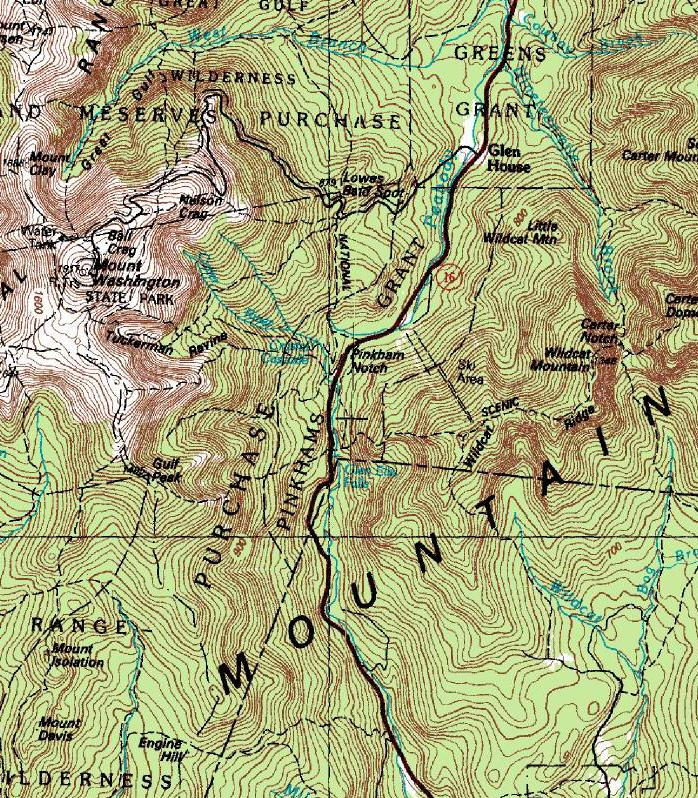
- The steep, glacier-carved walls of Pinkham Notch can be seen in this topographic map.
- Interactive map of Pinkham Notch
- Elevation: 2,032 ft (619 m)
- Traversed by: NH Route 16

Third Approach
- Location: Pinkham's Grant, Coos County, New Hampshire, United States
- Range: White Mountains
- Coordinates: 44.2576°N 71.2537°W
- Topo map: USGS Stairs Mountain, Jackson, Carter Dome, Mount Washington

Pinkham Notch (elevation 2032 ft. / 619 m) is a mountain pass in the White Mountains of north-central New Hampshire, United States. The notch is a result of extensive erosion by the Laurentide Ice Sheet during the Wisconsinian ice age. Pinkham Notch was eroded into a glacial U-shaped valley whose walls are formed by the Presidential, Wildcat, and Carter-Moriah ranges. Due to the volatility of the area's climate and rugged character of the terrain, a number of rare or endemic ecosystems have developed throughout the notch.

The presence of the notch was recorded in 1784 by Jeremy Belknap, but its isolation prevented further development for several years. The construction of New Hampshire Route 16 has led to increased accessibility and a rise in tourism. Its location makes it a hub for hiking and skiing.

== Geography ==
The notch separates the Presidential Range, which forms the western wall, from the Wildcat Range, which forms the eastern wall. Two rivers drain the notch; the Ellis River drains the south end and is a tributary of the Saco, and the Peabody River drains the north end and is a tributary of the Androscoggin.

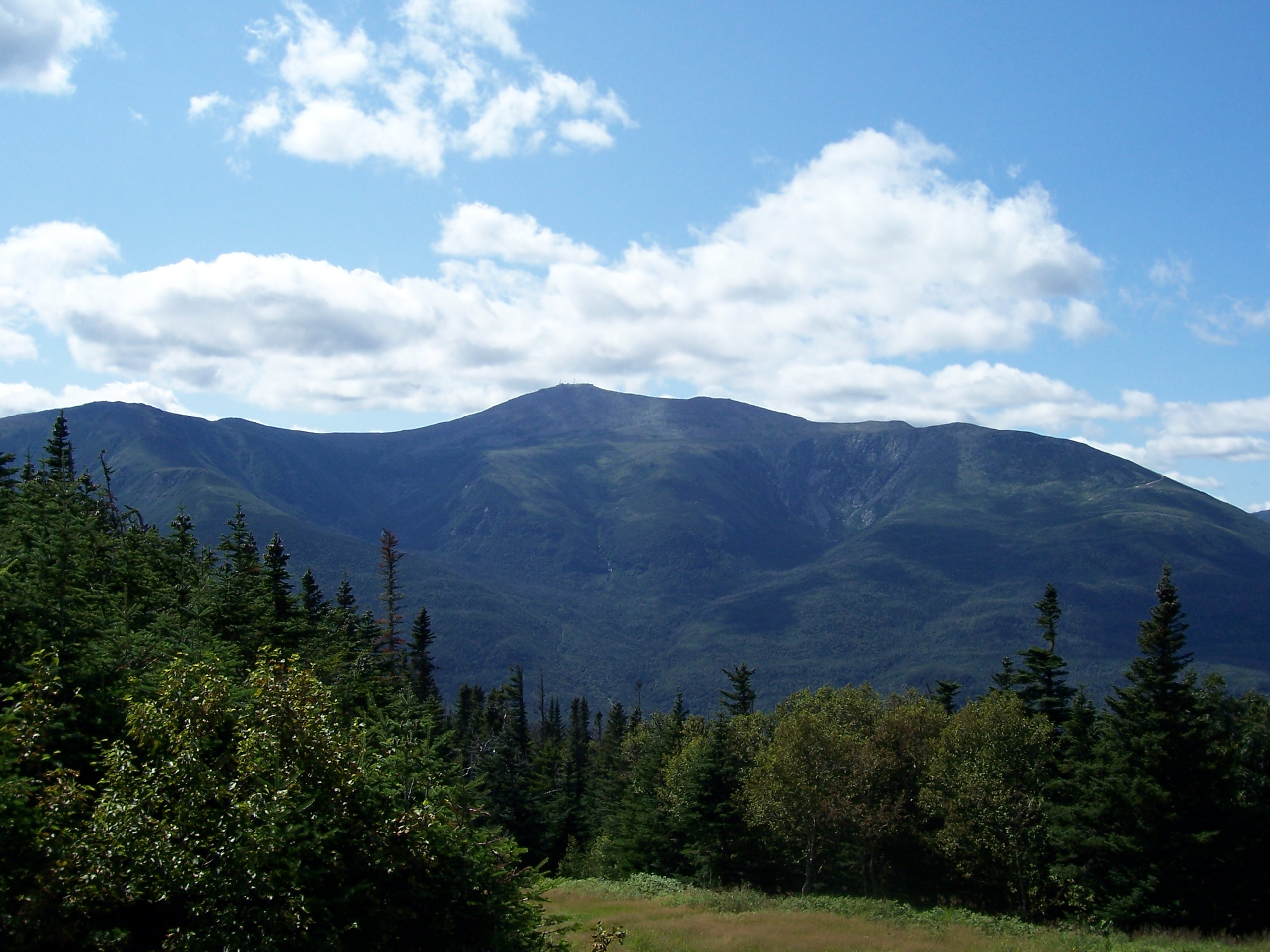
Mount Washington, which forms the western wall of Pinkham Notch, holds several glacial cirques. From left to right are Tuckerman Ravine, the Ravine of Raymond Cataract, and Huntington Ravine.

The bulk of the western slope of the notch is formed by Mount Washington, the highest peak in the northeast United States, reaching 6,288 feet (1,917 m) above sea level. Mount Washington rises more than 4,000 feet (1,200 m) above the floor of the notch. A number of glacial cirques are found on this side of the notch. The Great Gulf and its tributary cirques form the largest cirque in the White Mountains. South of the Great Gulf is Huntington Ravine, with a rocky, precipitous headwall renowned for its rock and ice climbing. The slope then dips into the Ravine of Raymond Cataract, a non-glacial "V-shaped" valley with a notable waterfall. After this comes Tuckerman Ravine, with a uniform, smoother headwall that is known for its high-quality skiing. After passing the Gulf of Slides, a smaller and lesser-known cirque, the notch opens up and continues until Jackson.

The eastern slope of the notch consists of the Wildcat and Carter-Moriah Ranges, slightly lower than the Presidential Range to the west. The Wildcat Range consists of five peaks, named A, B, C, D, and E from northeast to southwest in order of height. Wildcat A is the highest, at 4,422 feet (1,348 m). From the main ridge, the slopes drop very steeply, but not precipitously, to the floor of the notch. The Wildcat Mountain Ski Area occupies the western slopes of Wildcat up to the col between D and E peaks. As the notch rounds E peak, the slope becomes extremely steep, and Wildcat Ridge begins to drop to the end of the notch.

The Carter-Moriah Range lies to the north of Wildcat Ridge, forming the eastern side of Pinkham Notch all the way to the Androscoggin River. From south to north, the peaks overlooking the notch are Carter Dome (4,832 ft / 1,473 m), Mount Hight (4,675 ft / 1,425 m), South Carter Mountain (4,420 ft / 1,347 m), Middle Carter Mountain (4,600 ft / 1,402 m), North Carter Mountain (4,530 ft / 1,381 m), Imp Mountain (3,720 ft / 1,134 m), and Mount Moriah (4,049 ft / 1,234 m).

=== Climate ===
The weather in the area varies by altitude and the orientation of the land. A weather station has operated at around 2,000 feet since 1930.

== Climate ==
According to the Köppen Climate Classification system, Pinkham Notch has a humid continental climate, abbreviated "Dfb" on climate maps. The hottest temperature recorded in Pinkham Notch was 93 °F (34 °C) on July 20, 1982, while the coldest temperature recorded was −32 °F (−36 °C) on February 16, 1943.

Climate data for Pinkham Notch, New Hampshire, 1991–2020 normals, extremes 1930–present (elevation 2025 ft.)
Month	Jan	Feb	Mar	Apr	May	Jun	Jul	Aug	Sep	Oct	Nov	Dec	Year
Record high °F (°C)	64 (18)	72 (22)	78 (26)	86 (30)	90 (32)	91 (33)	93 (34)	92 (33)	92 (33)	86 (30)	75 (24)	67 (19)	93 (34)
Mean maximum °F (°C)	48.9 (9.4)	49.1 (9.5)	56.6 (13.7)	71.1 (21.7)	80.6 (27.0)	85.0 (29.4)	85.8 (29.9)	84.4 (29.1)	82.2 (27.9)	73.4 (23.0)	61.8 (16.6)	52.3 (11.3)	88.3 (31.3)
Mean daily maximum °F (°C)	26.0 (−3.3)	28.4 (−2.0)	36.2 (2.3)	48.5 (9.2)	61.9 (16.6)	70.0 (21.1)	75.0 (23.9)	74.0 (23.3)	67.5 (19.7)	54.4 (12.4)	41.8 (5.4)	31.5 (−0.3)	51.3 (10.7)
Daily mean °F (°C)	16.1 (−8.8)	17.9 (−7.8)	25.6 (−3.6)	37.9 (3.3)	50.2 (10.1)	58.9 (14.9)	64.0 (17.8)	62.8 (17.1)	56.3 (13.5)	44.6 (7.0)	33.1 (0.6)	22.6 (−5.2)	40.8 (4.9)
Mean daily minimum °F (°C)	6.2 (−14.3)	7.3 (−13.7)	14.9 (−9.5)	27.3 (−2.6)	38.5 (3.6)	47.9 (8.8)	53.1 (11.7)	51.5 (10.8)	45.0 (7.2)	34.8 (1.6)	24.4 (−4.2)	13.7 (−10.2)	30.4 (−0.9)
Mean minimum °F (°C)	−13.0 (−25.0)	−9.8 (−23.2)	−4.7 (−20.4)	16.1 (−8.8)	28.5 (−1.9)	37.0 (2.8)	43.4 (6.3)	41.8 (5.4)	32.3 (0.2)	22.8 (−5.1)	9.0 (−12.8)	−4.9 (−20.5)	−15.4 (−26.3)
Record low °F (°C)	−31 (−35)	−32 (−36)	−21 (−29)	−4 (−20)	10 (−12)	29 (−2)	32 (0)	31 (−1)	21 (−6)	8 (−13)	−7 (−22)	−31 (−35)	−32 (−36)
Average precipitation inches (mm)	5.31 (135)	4.28 (109)	4.87 (124)	5.75 (146)	5.48 (139)	5.88 (149)	5.48 (139)	5.12 (130)	4.99 (127)	7.82 (199)	5.83 (148)	5.98 (152)	66.79 (1,697)
Average snowfall inches (cm)	28.5 (72)	27.6 (70)	26.4 (67)	9.4 (24)	0.6 (1.5)	0.0 (0.0)	0.0 (0.0)	0.0 (0.0)	0.0 (0.0)	1.7 (4.3)	12.7 (32)	28.9 (73)	135.8 (343.8)
Average precipitation days (≥ 0.01 in)	14.3	12.7	13.3	13.0	14.8	14.3	14.1	13.1	11.5	14.2	13.9	16.0	165.2
Average snowy days (≥ 0.1 in)	10.8	10.6	9.4	4.3	0.3	0.0	0.0	0.0	0.0	1.2	5.5	11.2	53.3
Source 1: NOAA
Source 2: National Weather Service

== Environment ==
The climate, and as a result, the flora and fauna, of Pinkham Notch varies greatly with elevation. As elevations increase on the walls of the notch, climate and ecosystems change to those of increasingly northern occurrence. Biomes range from a low-elevation northern hardwood forest at the base of Mount Washington to alpine-Arctic vegetation near the summit comparable to vegetation found at the latitude of Labrador.

=== Below 2500 ft. — northern hardwood forest ===
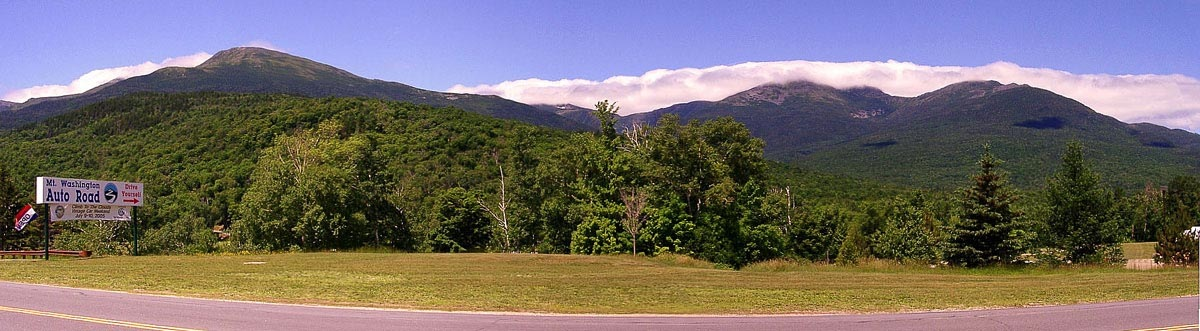
The floor of Pinkham Notch, looking toward Mount Washington

The lowest elevations of Pinkham Notch are occupied by a northern hardwood forest. This forest type is primarily deciduous and consists mostly of sugar maple, American beech, and yellow birch. There is also a proliferation of understory and forest floor plants; common examples include wild sarsaparilla, painted trillium, hobblebush, and Indian cucumber-root.

The northern hardwood forest also contains the greatest diversity of animal life in the notch. Mammals include chipmunks, raccoons, white-tailed deer, black bears, and moose. There are also a large number of birds in this forest; frequently seen are red-eyed vireos, hermit thrushes, and ovenbirds. Amphibians are also found in the northern hardwood forest. Red efts, the terrestrial stage of development for the red-spotted newt, congregate in large numbers after heavy rains; also present are American toads, spring peepers, and wood frogs.

At around 2,000 feet (610 m), species from higher forest zones begin to mix with the northern hardwoods in what is known as the "transition zone". As elevation within this zone increases, species from the lower hardwood forest begin to drop out. By 2,500 feet (760 m), yellow birch is the only deciduous species that remains, and the forest becomes a spruce-fir forest.

=== 2500 ft. to 4000 ft. — spruce/fir forest ===
As elevation increases, the forest is subjected to colder temperatures, increased moisture, and acidic, infertile soils. As a result, conifers, or "softwoods" become the dominant species. Two trees, red spruce and balsam fir, are present throughout this zone, with paper birch, striped maple and mountain ash present in its lower levels. Like the hardwood forest below it, the spruce-fir forest also holds understory plants; commonly found are wood sorrel, Indian pipes, Canada mayflowers, and bluebead lilies. Fungi are also common in the moist environment.

Most of the animals in the spruce-fir forest have ranges that extend into the balsam fir forest higher up. Warblers are abundant; more than ten species exist in this forest type. Other common birds include brown-capped chickadees, spruce grouse, and yellow-capped woodpeckers. Mammals include the red squirrel and the pine marten.

=== 4000 ft. to timberline — balsam fir forest ===
As elevation continues to increase, only the hardiest trees remain in the forest, which is composed almost exclusively of balsam fir. Most of the understory plants and animals from the upper spruce-fir zone, however, can be found in this forest. Moisture causes nutrients to be stripped from the soil and brought to lower elevations, and decomposition takes place at a rate that is too slow to replenish them.

In the upper reaches of the balsam fir zone, winds and temperatures are extreme enough to force the trees into stunted, "bonsai-like" shapes. Known as krummholz, from the German word for "crooked wood", trees in this area are often bent into bizarre shapes by the combined effects of wind, temperature, and airborne ice particles. Branches that are perpendicular to the prevailing winds are often killed, leaving "flag trees" that point in the direction of the wind. Eventually, conditions become extreme enough to prevent any tree growth; the elevation at which this occurs is known as tree line, and usually occurs at around 4,500 ft (1,400 m) in the White Mountains, depending on wind exposure.

=== Above timberline — alpine zone ===
On the highest slopes of the west wall of the notch, trees are unable to grow, and an "alpine zone" of alpine-Arctic vegetation exists. Vegetation in this zone tends to be lichens, sedges or small, low-lying plants that can resist the constant exposure to the wind. Most plants in this area are perennial; the growing season is far too short to allow for annuals.

Alpine plants usually occur in communities spaced between barren talus slopes. Cushion-shaped Diapensia lapponica usually grows in communities in the windiest areas, and in less exposed sites sedge, heath, snowbank, and alpine bog communities can be found.

== History ==
Pinkham Notch was originally a riverine, "V-shaped" valley until the Laurentide Ice Sheet shaped it into its current form, a "U-shaped" valley. This shaping occurred during the Wisconsinian Ice Age, 25–50,000 years ago. The geology of the region became greatly altered by this event; much of the weaker rock was stripped from the region, leaving only highly-resistant mica schist. As the glaciers retreated, a layer of glacial till was deposited, including several glacial erratics. A notable glacial erratic in the area is Mount Washington's Glen Boulder.

Artist Samuel Lancaster Gerry's 1877 depiction of Pinkham Notch, entitled "Tuckerman Ravine and Lion's Head".

The notch first appears in recorded history in 1784, when an expedition led by Jeremy Belknap camped in the notch before ascending to the summit of Mount Washington through Huntington Ravine. Pinkham Notch was far more isolated than neighboring Crawford Notch; as a result, the first settler of Pinkham Notch came in 1827, 43 years after habitation of Crawford Notch. The first settler, Hayes Copp, built a homestead in the then-uninhabited area, near where the Dolly Copp campground stands today. Copp and his wife lived alone in the wilderness until Daniel Pinkham completed the first road through the notch between in 1836, finally providing a link between the Copp homestead and civilization. In 1851, a railroad was built to Gorham, and a hotel, the Glen House, was constructed to accommodate passengers. Mount Washington was the main attraction in the area; a bridle path was constructed from the Glen House to hotels on the summit, which was later improved into what would become the Mount Washington Auto Road. Completion of the road in 1861 led to a massive increase in tourism.

Meanwhile, logging began in the Pinkham area. After almost total deforestation of the White Mountain region, the White Mountain National Forest was created in 1911, and the Mount Washington area was added to the national forest in 1914. With the preservation of the area, emphasis shifted from logging to recreation. The Appalachian Mountain Club converted a logging camp near the height-of-land into what is now the Pinkham Notch Visitor Center in 1921. The Appalachian Trail was built through the visitor center, making it an important trailhead for ascents of Mount Washington. Meanwhile, ski trails began to be constructed by the Civilian Conservation Corps on Wildcat Mountain, and the ski resort was opened in 1958.

== Recreation ==
Pinkham Notch is easily accessible by New Hampshire Route 16. Numerous opportunities for recreation exist in the area.

=== Hiking ===
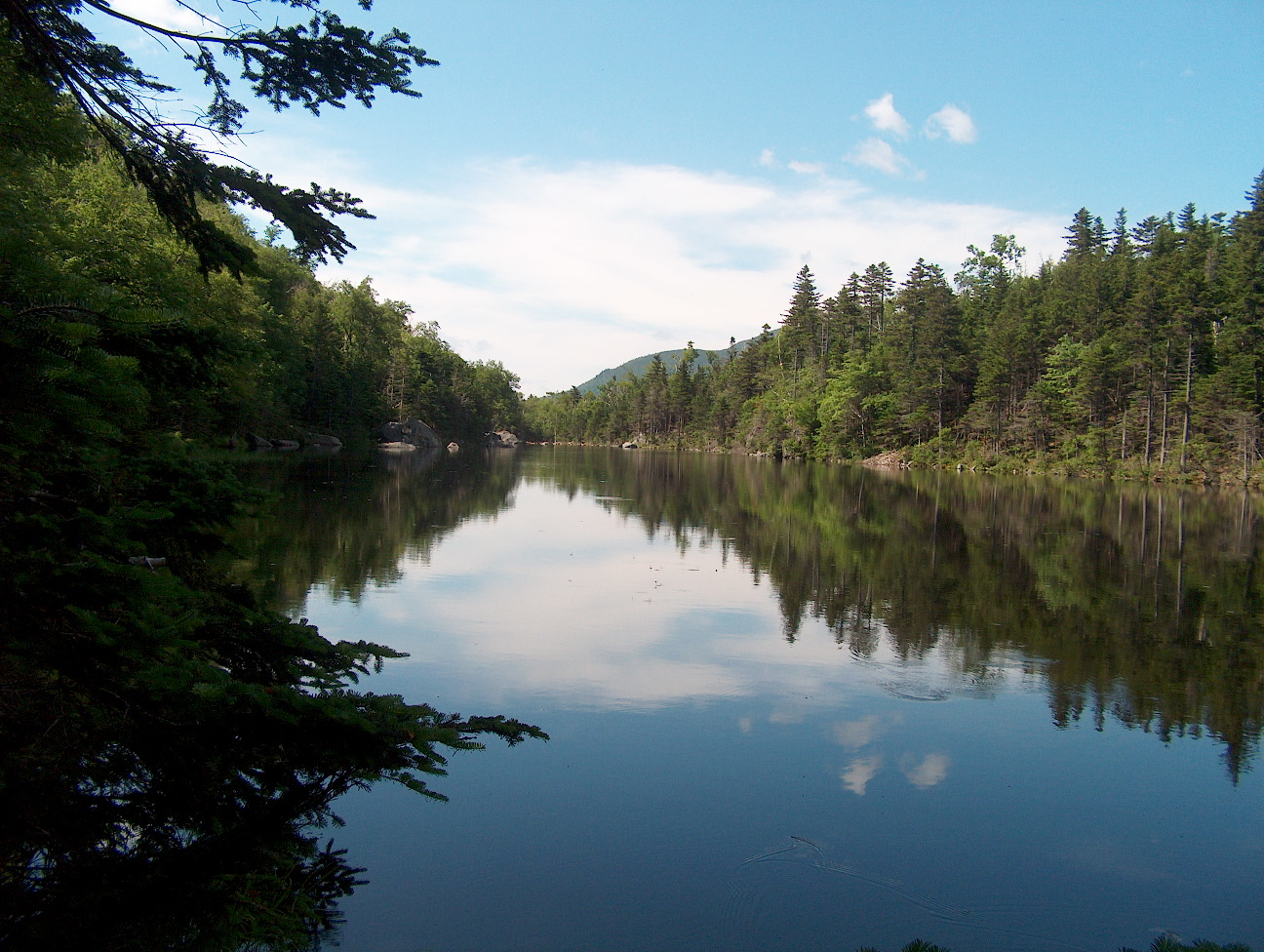
Lost Pond in Pinkham Notch

Mount Washington is a common objective, and is often climbed from Pinkham Notch. There are numerous trail approaches from the Appalachian Mountain Club's visitor center. Although trail distances seem short, the trip to the summit should not be underestimated; most trail approaches involve at least 4,000 vertical feet (1,200 m) of climbing, including an ascent of the rocky summit cone and the boulder-strewn upper slopes. Weather changes very quickly, one must be prepared for extreme conditions, and fatalities are not unknown. The Tuckerman Ravine Trail is the most popular trail in the notch, ascending to the summit via the headwall of Tuckerman Ravine. The Huntington Ravine Trail is widely considered the most difficult trail in New Hampshire, making its way up the precipitous headwall of neighboring Huntington Ravine, where there are several rock climbing opportunities.

On the other side of the notch, the Wildcat Range is a popular objective. The five summits can be reached via the Wildcat Ridge Trail; the first two miles are extremely difficult, and require skill on short, yet exposed, rock scrambles. This part of the trail is frequently bypassed by following the ski area's Polecat Trail to the summit of D Peak.

The Appalachian Trail, which extends over 2,150 miles (3,460 km) from Georgia to Maine, runs along the Presidential Range before crossing the notch and ascending to the summits of the Wildcat Range.

There are also less challenging hikes that are equally scenic. Some of these include Glen Ellis Falls, a waterfall on the Ellis River, and Square Ledge, with an impressive view of Mount Washington for modest effort.

=== Skiing ===
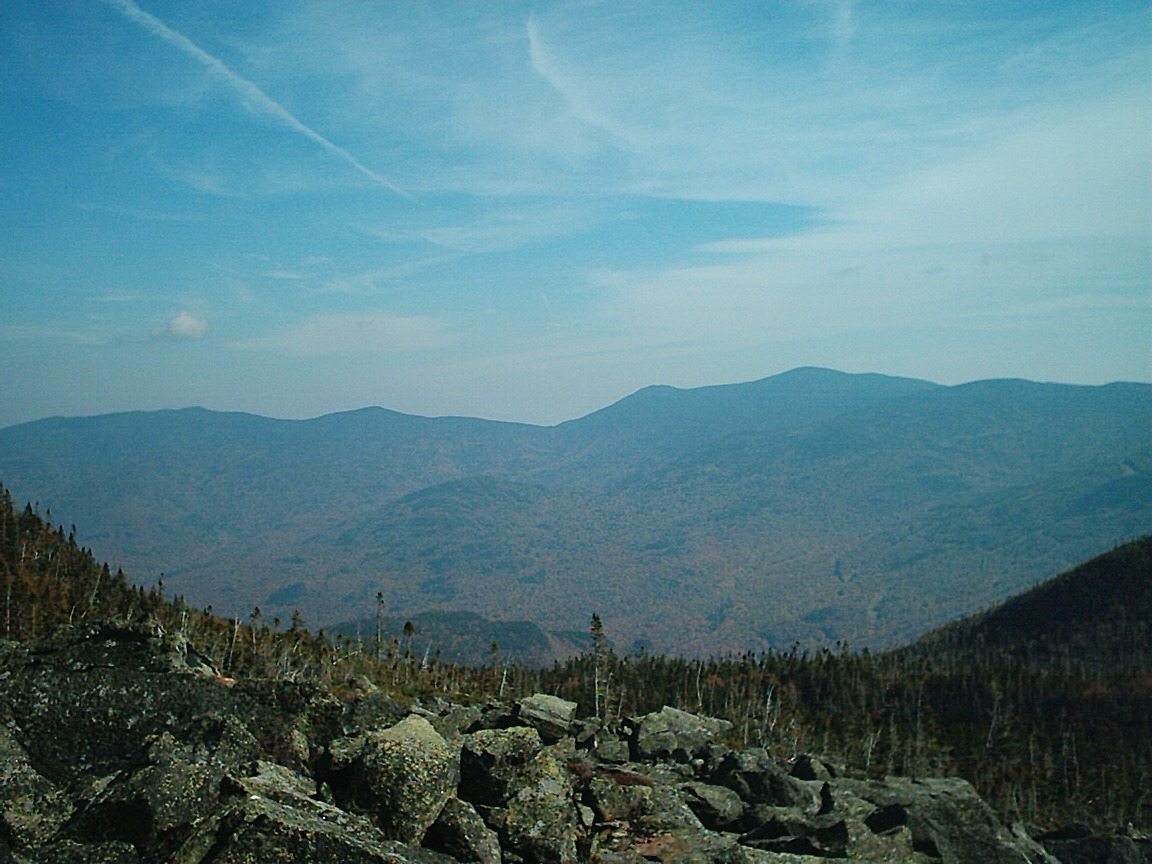
The Wildcat Range, as seen from Tuckerman Ravine, forms the eastern slope of Pinkham Notch. A ski area operates on the range's northwestern face.

The area also has many opportunities for both alpine and Nordic skiing. The bowl of Tuckerman Ravine is famous for its extremely steep backcountry skiing. Long lines are common during the peak spring-skiing season of April and May. Wildcat Mountain offers groomed ski trails and lifts, and is a better choice for less-experienced skiers. The centerpiece of the ski-area is the gondola, which runs during the summer, and offers views of the Presidentials with no expended effort.

For Nordic skiing, Great Glen Trails offers a large, groomed trail system that also includes the lower half of the Auto Road. Several warming huts are scattered around the trail system, including scenic Great Angel Cabin, with views of the Great Gulf and surrounding peaks. Great Glen also permits biking on the trails during the summer, and is the only mountain bike facility in the notch. Another cross-country trail system exists in the town of Jackson, extending as far as the summit of Wildcat Mountain.

== See also ==
- List of mountain passes in New Hampshire
- Mount Washington (New Hampshire)
- White Mountains (New Hampshire)
