= Prentiss =

Prentiss may refer to:

== People ==
=== Given name ===
- Prentiss Barnes (1925–2006), American singer
- Prentiss M. Brown (1889–1973), Michigan politician
- Robert Prentiss Daniel (1902–1968), American academic
- Prentiss Douglass (1884–1949), American football coach and player
- Prentiss Hubb (born 1999), American basketball player
- Prentiss Ingraham (1843–1904), American soldier and mercenary
- Prentiss Mellen (1764–1840), Massachusetts jurist
- Prentiss "Air" Noland (born 2005), American football player
- Prentiss Oakley (1905–1957), Louisiana police officer
- Prentiss Taylor (1907–1991), American artist
- Prentiss Waggner (born 1990), American football player
- Prentiss Walker (1917–1998), Mississippi politician

=== Surname ===
- Prentiss (surname)

=== Fictional people ===
- Adelaide Prentiss, a character from the novel One of Us Is Lying by Karen M. McManus
- Amy Prentiss, title character in the American TV series Amy Prentiss
- Charles Prentiss, senior partner of Prentiss-McCabe in BBC television and radio series Absolute Power
- David Prentiss (Mayor/President), a character from the novel series Chaos Walking
- Emily Prentiss, a character in the American television series Criminal Minds
- Jane Prentiss, a character from the horror-fiction podcast The Magnus Archives
- Nora Prentiss, title character of 1947 film
- Pimli Prentiss, a character from The Dark Tower
- Vanessa Prentiss, a character from The Young and the Restless

== Places in the United States ==
- Prentiss, Kentucky
- Prentiss, Maine
- Prentiss, Mississippi
- Prentiss, Bolivar County, Mississippi
- Prentiss, Ohio
- Prentiss County, Mississippi

== Other uses ==
- Prentiss Bridge, a covered bridge in Langdon, New Hampshire, U.S.
- Prentiss County School District, Mississippi, U.S.
- Prentiss M. Brown Freeway, Michigan, U.S.
- USS Prentiss, a U.S. Navy ship name
  - USS Prentiss (AKA-102), WWII attack cargo ship
  - USS A. G. Prentiss (1912), WWI tugboat
- Mary Prentiss Inn, Cambridge, Massachusetts, U.S.

== See also ==
- Prentiss House (disambiguation)
- Prentis
