= Walter Frost =

Walter Frost may refer to:

- Walter Frost (footballer) (1873–1955), English footballer
- Walter Archer Frost (1875–1964), American writer of plays and stories
- SS Walter L. Frost, a wooden package freighter that operated on the Great Lakes

== See also ==
- Walter Frost House, an historic house in Cambridge, Massachusetts
