= USS Prentiss =

USS Prentiss is a United States Navy ship name and may refer to the following:

- USS Prentiss (AKA-102), a World War II Tolland-class attack cargo ship of the United States Navy named after Prentiss County, Mississippi.
- USS A. G. Prentiss (1912) (U.S. merchant ship id# 209585), named after businessman Alfred G. Prentiss, a commercial vessel that served in WWI as a USN tug.

== See also ==
- Prentiss (disambiguation)
