= Historic Inns of Annapolis =

Coordinates: 38°58′45″N 76°29′24″W

The Historic Inns of Annapolis consist of three historically rich inns dating back to the end of the American Revolutionary War. The historical buildings, located in Annapolis, Maryland, include the Maryland Inn, Governor Calvert House, and the Robert Johnson House as well as the Treaty of Paris restaurant and the King of France Tavern, which are the on-site dining facilities. Managed by Remington Hotels, the hotel is located in the heart of the city of Annapolis, MD.

The Historic Inns of Annapolis is a member of Historic Hotels of America, the official program of the National Trust for Historic Preservation.

== The Maryland Inn ==
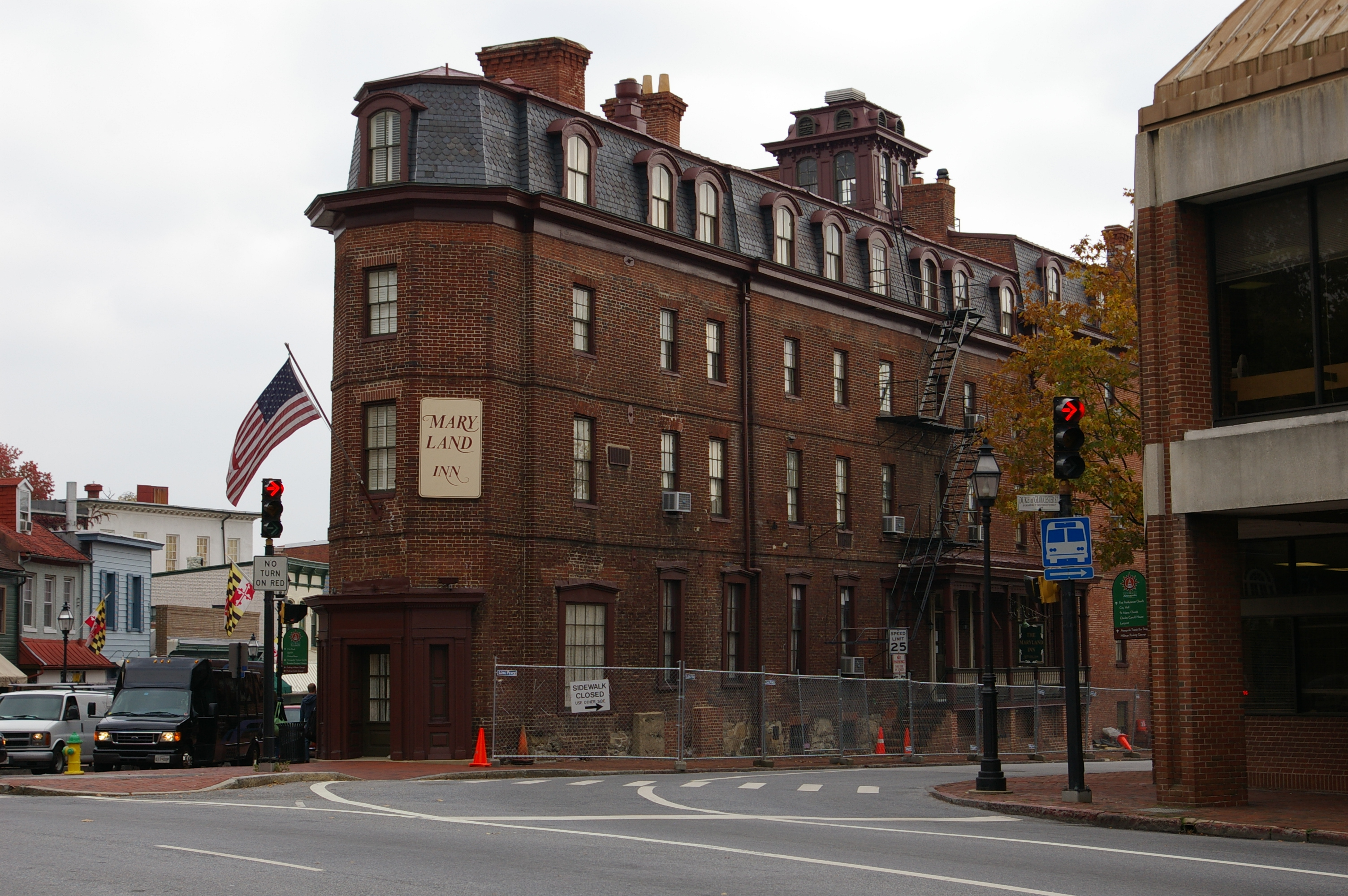
The Maryland Inn of Annapolis, Maryland

Thomas Hyde was a respected merchant and civic leader who acquired a long-term lease on a lot on Church Circle in 1772, where he constructed the front part of the Maryland Inn. He advertised it for sale in 1782, describing it as "an elegant brick house adjoining Church Circle in a dry and healthy part of the city ... one hundred feet front, three story height, has 20 fireplaces and is one of the first houses in the state for a house of entertainment."

Sarah Ball was the inn’s manager in 1784 when she advertised that she had "opened a tavern at the house formerly kept by her, fronting Church (now Duke of Gloucester) Street; and having supplied herself with everything necessary and convenient." The inn remained a popular place for lodging throughout the 19th century. It was acquired by the Maryland Hotel Company in 1868 and remained the most prominent Annapolis hotel and the favorite rendezvous for important national state and military visitors.

By World War I, the inn’s facilities were outmoded and many of its rooms were converted into offices and apartments. There were several owners over the next several decades, and it was restored in 1953 to preserve its Colonial design but provide it with modern amenities. In March 2007, Remington Hotels opened a Starbucks Coffee in what once was the King of France Tavern.

== Governor Calvert House ==
The 1720s house originally built at 58 State Circle was a 1 1/2-story structure with a gambrel roof. Its earliest occupant was Charles Calvert, governor of Maryland from 1720 to 1727.

Much of the building was destroyed by fire in 1764, and the Calverts moved to the country. The remains of the house were incorporated into a two-story Gregorian-style building that was used until 1784 as barracks by the State of Maryland.

The property changed hands three times between 1800 and 1854, until Annapolis Mayor Abram Claude purchased it. Claude enlarged the building and endowed it with Victorian features.

The house was privately owned through the 1900s until Paul Pearson purchased it and proposed plans for its restoration and expansion into a large inn. His collaboration with Historic Annapolis led to the archaeological research that uncovered several architectural features of the original building. One of the most remarkable is the hypocaust heating system that was discovered in the basement.

== The Robert Johnson House ==
In 1772, an Annapolis barber by the name of Robert Johnson purchased town lot #73, and in 1773, his grandson built the brick house that still stands at 23 State Circle. The main brick house remained with Johnson heirs until around 1856. A portion of the lot was sold in 1808 to Elizabeth Thompson, who probably built the frame house at 1 School Street.

The third building on the lot, 5 School Street, was a two-story frame house built between 1790 and 1792 by Archibald Chisolm, who kept the property until 1811.

In 1880 William H. Bellis purchased the Johnson house and opened a tailor shop facing Main Street. He died in 1902, leaving 23 State Circle to his daughter Maud Morrow. She acquired 1 and 5 School Street, and converted the building into the Morrow Apartments. Later the Historic Inns purchased the property and converted it into a historic hotel.

== See also other Historical Hotels in America ==
- Mary Prentiss Inn
- Basin Harbor Club
- DesBarres Manor Inn
