= USS Tatum =

Buckley-class destroyer escort

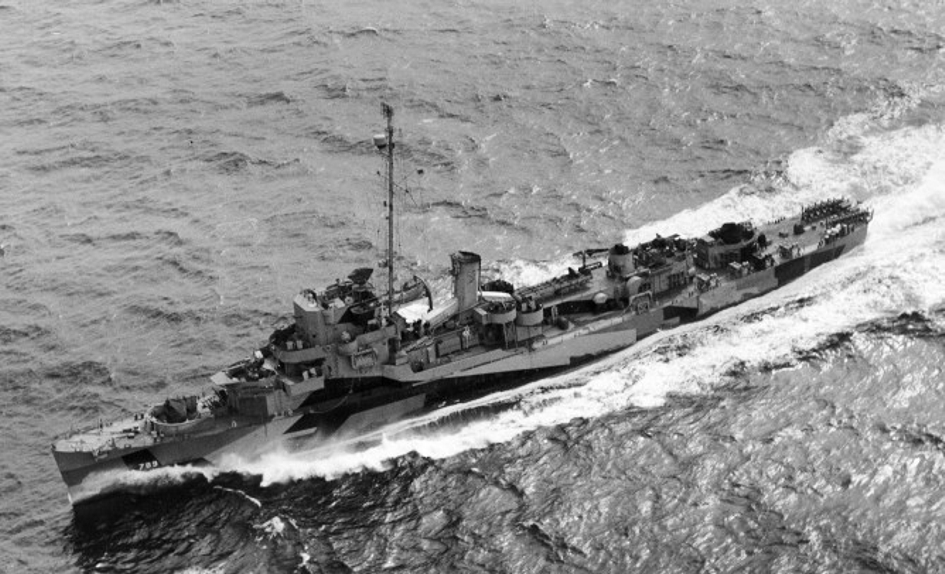

History

United States
- Laid down: 22 April 1943
- Launched: 7 August 1943
- Commissioned: 22 November 1943
- Decommissioned: 15 November 1946
- Reclassified: APD-81 15 December 1944
- Stricken: 1 June 1960
- Fate: Scrapped 8 May 1961

General characteristics
- Class & type: Buckley-class destroyer escort
- Displacement: 1,400 to 1,740 tons full load
- Length: Overall:306 ft (93.3 m)
- Beam: 36 ft (11 m)
- Draft: 9.6 ft (2.9 m)
- Propulsion: 2 × "D" Express boilers; 2 × Electric turbines; 2 × Screws; 12,000 shp
- Speed: 24+ knots (44.4 km/h)
- Range: 4,940 nm (9,150 km)
- Complement: Officers: 15; Enlisted: 198
- Armament: 3 × 3 in (76 mm) Mk22 guns; 1 × 1.1"/75 caliber gun Mk2 quad AA gun; 8 × 20 mm Mk 4 AA guns; 3 × 21" Mk15 TT; 1 × Hedgehog Projector Mk10; 8 × Mk6 depth charge projectors; 2 × Mk9 depth charge tracks

USS Tatum (DE-789/APD-81) was a Buckley-class destroyer escort in service with the United States Navy from 1944 to 1946. She was scrapped in 1960.

== History ==
=== Construction and commissioning ===
Tatum was laid down by the Consolidated Steel Corp. on 22 April 1943; launched on 7 August 1943, sponsored by Mrs. Cecile Cofield Tatum, and commissioned on 22 November 1943.

=== Battle of the Atlantic ===
After shakedown training in the vicinity of Bermuda, the destroyer escort performed escort duty along the east coast until 25 March when she departed Tompkinsville, N.Y., in the screen of a convoy bound for England. She reached Plymouth on 19 April and returned – via Milford Haven, Wales, and Belfast, Northern Ireland – to New York City on 12 May.

Her second and third transatlantic voyages took the ship to North Africa. She departed the east coast on 28 May in the screen of the escort carriers Kasaan Bay, Tulagi, and Mission Bay headed for French Morocco. Upon delivering aircraft at Casablanca, the warships returned to the United States on 17 June 1944, and Tatum moored at Bayonne, N.J. She joined Kasaan Bay and Tulagi once again on 28 June as they weighed anchor for Algeria. The ships made Oran on 10 July; and, the next day, Tatum got under way to pick up SS Cross Keys at Casablanca and escort her to Bizerte, Tunisia. The destroyer escort returned to Oran on the 16th and, four days later, cleared port once again to protect the British aircraft carriers HMS Hunter and HMS Stalker during their passage to Malta. On the 23d, Tatum dropped 130 depth charges on a submarine contact but apparently scored no kill. The force reached Malta on 25 July. Augmented by Kasaan Bay and Tulagi, the unit steamed to Alexandria, Egypt, and then returned to Malta where they arrived on 3 August.

The next day, Tatum reported to Naples where she embarked the commander of a landing craft convoy for the impending invasion of southern France. Tatum stood out of Naples on 9 August, joined the landing craft in the Gulf of Pozzuoli, and escorted them to the staging area at Ajaccio, Corsica. Before dawn on the 15th, the convoy arrived off Saint-Tropez where Tatum transferred the convoy commander to LCI-196. She then patrolled off Cape Camarat until the following afternoon. From 17 July until early autumn, Tatum protected convoys shuttling between Corsica, Sardinia, and southern France. On 16 October, she departed Marseille in the screen of a convoy bound for Bizerte and Oran. During the early part of November, Tatum escorted another convoy from Oran to Marseille then screened the Army transport Mariposa to Naples and returned to Oran on 15 November. Tatum got underway again on 24 November to screen a convoy back to the United States, arriving at New York on 11 December.

=== Pacific War ===
On 12 December 1944, she began conversion to a high-speed transport at Tompkinsville. On 15 December, she was officially redesignated APD-81.

Tatum (APD-81) cleared Tompkinsville on 6 March 1945, steamed to the Chesapeake Bay for training until the 14th, and stood out of Hampton Roads on the 16th in company with Prentiss. Following port calls at Panama and San Diego, Tatum entered Pearl Harbor on 12 April 1945. She conducted more training in the Hawaiian Islands before getting underway with a convoy headed, via the Marshalls and Carolines, for the Ryūkyūs.

Tatum arrived off Okinawa's Hagushi beaches on 19 May and reported for duty with the antiaircraft and antisubmarine pickets stationed around the island. At dusk on 29 May, the warship was proceeding to her radar picket station when she was attacked by four enemy aircraft. As the first intruder swooped in across her bow, Tatum's guns opened up and scored hits on its wing and fuselage. It banked sharply and headed for the ship's starboard side. About 40 feet from her, the aircraft's left wing and tail struck the water, jarring loose the bomb it was carrying. It skipped off the surface, struck and careened off the underside of a gun sponson, then pierced Tatum's hull and two of her longitudinal bulkheads. The dud came to rest with its nose protruding eight inches into the passageway inboard of the executive officer's stateroom. The aircraft also skimmed over the water into Tatum, dented her hull, and knocked out her director fire control and communications with the engine room.

Meanwhile, the second and third aircraft were setting up for their attack. Tatum drove one of them off with gunfire, but the other continued on toward the ship until a hail of gunfire caused the pilot to lose control of his aircraft. It banked sharply to the right, passed by Tatum's port side, and splashed about 100 yards astern. Within seconds, his cautious comrade renewed his attack. He dived his aircraft on the fast transport, barely missing the port wing of her bridge, and Tatum's antiaircraft fire followed it up as it climbed, did a wing-over, and prepared to come in again. The third and final attack carried it across the ship's fantail and into the water about 50 feet from her starboard quarter.

The pilot of the fourth aircraft apparently had been holding back waiting for his colleagues to open a favorable route of attack. He then circled his aircraft, banked it to the left, and dived it at Tatum. Her barrage ripped off part of its left wing, and it plummeted toward the water, splashing into the sea about 30 feet from her port bow. Then an underwater explosion rocked Tatum severely but caused no damage.

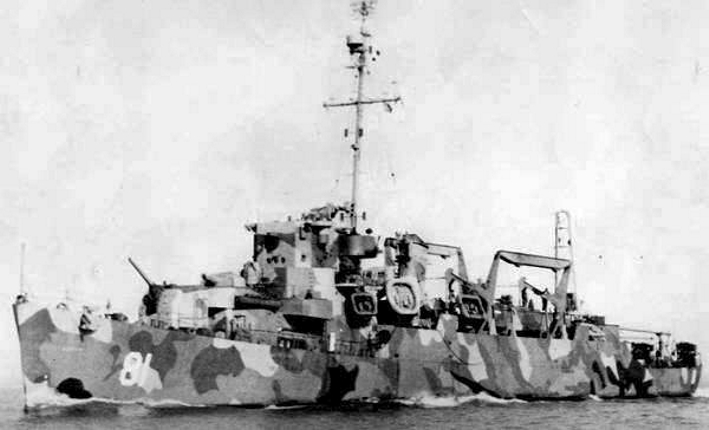
Tatum as a high-speed transport.

Despite considerable damage to the fast transport, her crew had all essential equipment back in operation within 15 minutes. Relieved by Walter C. Wann later that evening, she stopped at Hagushi to take on a bomb disposal officer and moved two miles out to sea where the dud was disarmed and dropped overboard. Tatum returned to Hagushi the following morning; then moved to Kerama Retto for repairs.

Tatum underwent temporary repairs and departed the Okinawa area on 11 June to escort a convoy to Ulithi. From there, she screened Briareus to San Pedro Bay, Leyte, where her permanent repairs were completed; and Tatum conducted exercises with Texas, Mississippi, Gainard, and Barber. On 18 August, she departed San Pedro Bay to escort Idaho and Mississippi to Okinawa, entering Buckner Bay on the 21st.

Tatum spent eight more months in the Far East, assisting in various phases of the post war occupation and reconstruction. Between 9 and 11 September, she screened a task unit carrying occupation officials from Buckner Bay to Wakanoura Wan, Honshū, Japan. She remained there until 19 September, assisting in the evacuation of Allied prisoners of war. From there, she shifted to Nagasaki where she supplied boats for the evacuation pool. On 25 September, Tatum put to sea for Buckner Bay where she arrived the following day. Three weeks later, the high-speed transport sailed for the Philippines. At Manila, she joined a convoy of troopships bound for French Indochina and arrived at Haiphong on 2 November. After embarking soldiers of the Chinese 52d Army, the convoy got underway on the 4th for Chinwangtao where it arrived on the 12th and disembarked the troops.

Tatum continued to shuttle passengers between Chinese ports until mid-April 1946. On the 12th, she stood out of Hong Kong to return to the United States. After stops at Guam, in the Marshalls, and at Pearl Harbor, the ship reached San Pedro, California, on 9 May 1946. On the 18th, she resumed her voyage east and arrived at Philadelphia, Pa., on 3 June. By 5 July, she was in the Charleston (S.C.) Navy Yard undergoing inactivation overhaul.

=== Decommissioning and fate ===
In mid-October 1946, the high-speed transport was towed to Green Cove Springs, Florida where she was placed out of commission on 15 November 1946. Tatum remained out of commission, in reserve, until 1 June 1960 when her name was struck from the Navy List. On 8 May 1961, she was sold for scrap to the Southern Scrap Metal Co., New Orleans, Louisiana

== Namesake ==
Laurice Aldridge Tatum was born on 7 December 1894 in Chambers County, Alabama. He enlisted in the Navy at Atlanta, Georgia, on 29 June 1917 as a hospital apprentice. Following training at San Francisco, he served at the Naval Hospital in Fort Lyon, Colorado, and in the receiving ship at Norfolk, Virginia. On 15 October 1918, he was transferred to USS Alabama, on which he served until 28 May 1919. Pharmacist's Mate 2d Class Tatum completed his enlistment at the Naval Hospital in Philadelphia and was honorably discharged at Atlanta, Ga., on 18 August 1919.

During the ensuing nine years, he attended Atlanta Southern Dental College, Atlanta, Georgia, and received his degree as a doctor of dental surgery. On 9 August 1928, Dr. Tatum was appointed an assistant dental surgeon in the United States Naval Reserve.

Late in August 1940, Lieutenant Commander Tatum reported to Naval Air Station Norfolk, Virginia, for active duty. He was serving on USS Wasp on 15 September 1942, as that aircraft carrier and USS Hornet were covering the movement of reinforcements from Espiritu Santo to Guadalcanal. When Wasp was torpedoed by an Imperial Japanese Navy submarine, Lt. Comdr. Tatum was among those trapped in the carrier's forecastle, cut off from the rest of the ship by raging flames. Rather than trying to save himself by jumping overboard, Tatum remained in the carrier to aid and comfort the wounded. He apparently went down with the ship when she sank. He was posthumously awarded the Silver Star.

== Awards ==
USS Tatum earned two battle stars during World War II.
