= Prentiss House =

Prentiss House may refer to:

- Prentiss-Payson House, Arlington, Massachusetts, listed on the National Register of Historic Places (NRHP)
- William Prentiss House, Arlington, Massachusetts, NRHP-listed
- Prentis House, Hadley, Massachusetts
- Addison Prentiss House, Worcester, Massachusetts, NRHP-listed
- Warren-Prentis Historic District, Detroit, Michigan, NRHP-listed
- Frederick Prentiss House, Columbus, OH, listed on the NRHP in Ohio
- Prentiss-Tulford House, Columbus, OH, listed on the NRHP in Ohio

== See also ==
- Mary Prentiss Inn, Cambridge, Massachusetts, USA
- Prentiss (disambiguation)
