= Livermore, New Hampshire =

Town in New Hampshire, United States

- Township
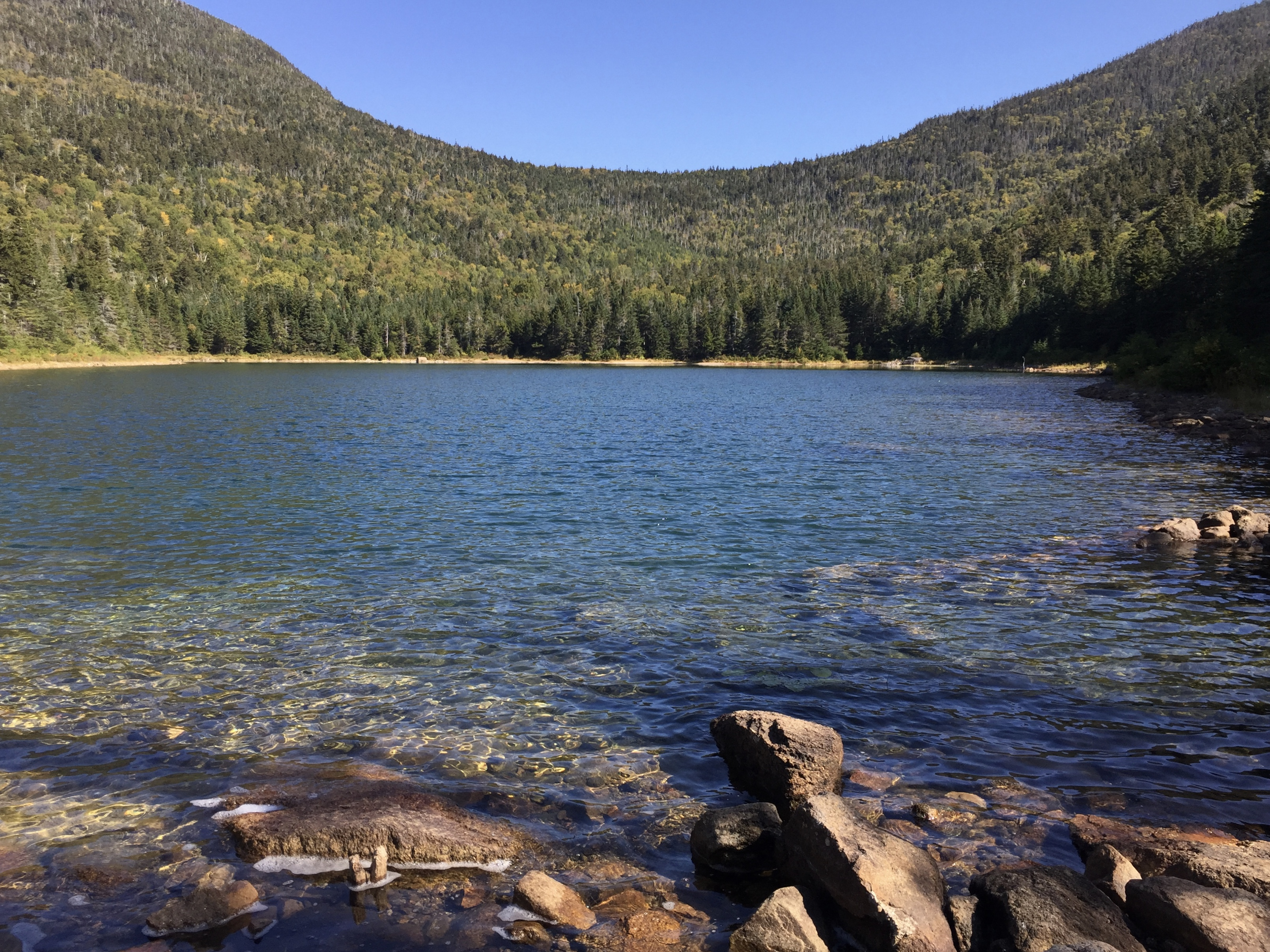
- East Pond in the western part of Livermore

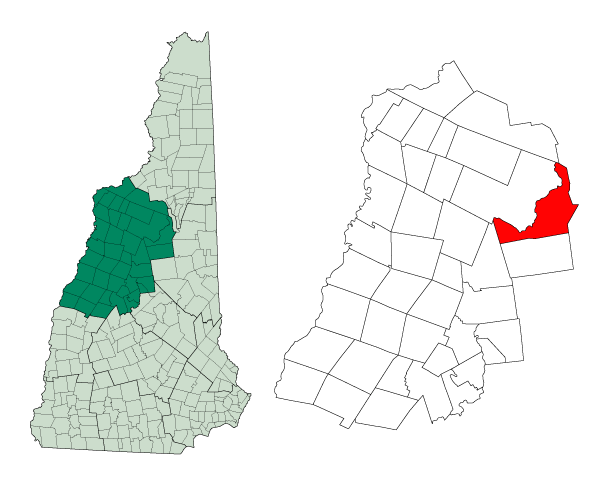
- Location in Grafton County, New Hampshire
- Coordinates: 44°02′41″N 71°27′35″W
- Country: United States
- State: New Hampshire
- County: Grafton

Area
  - Total: 63.9 sq mi (165.6 km^{2})
  - Land: 63.8 sq mi (165.2 km^{2})
  - Water: 0.15 sq mi (0.4 km^{2}) 0.26%
- Elevation: 1,264 ft (385 m)

Population (2020)
  - Total: 2
  - Density: 0.026/sq mi (0.01/km^{2})
- Time zone: UTC-5 (Eastern)
  - Summer (DST): UTC-4 (Eastern)
- Area code: 603
- FIPS code: 33-009-42820
- GNIS feature ID: 873650

Livermore is an unincorporated civil township and ghost town in Grafton County, New Hampshire, United States. It was briefly inhabited as a logging town in the late 19th and early 20th centuries. The site of the former village is approximately 16 miles (26 km) west of North Conway, about 1.5 miles (2.4 km) off U.S. Route 302 (the Crawford Notch Highway) via the U.S. Forest Service Sawyer River Road. The logging operation was established by Daniel Saunders Jr. and Charles W. Saunders, members of the Saunders family. The town was named for Samuel Livermore, a former United States senator who was the grandfather of Daniel Saunders' wife. The population was reported as two at the 2020 census.

== Geography ==
Livermore is in the White Mountains region of northern New Hampshire, along the eastern border of Grafton County. According to the U.S. Census Bureau, the town has a total area of 63.9 square miles (165.6 km^{2}), of which 63.8 square miles (165.2 km^{2}) are land and 0.2 square miles (0.4 km^{2}), or 0.26%, is water. Nearly all of the town's area (99.7%) is part of the White Mountain National Forest.

To the south is Waterville Valley, to the north and west is Lincoln (and a southern tip of Bethlehem), and to the east are Hart's Location, Bartlett and the northwestern corner of Albany.

The village of Livermore was benchmarked with an elevation of 1,264 feet (385 m), a quarter mile from the eastern boundary adjoining Hart's Location.

Livermore is a long, relatively narrow township, forming a very rough approximation of a crescent with its endpoints at the north and west. Livermore and its neighbor to the west, Lincoln, occupy a large area of uninhabited woodland once known as the "Pemigewasset Wilderness" (a portion of which is preserved in the present-day WMNF Pemigewasset Wilderness in Lincoln). The original boundary between the two towns did not follow natural features, such as the crest of the divide that separates the Pemigewasset River and Saco River drainages, which led to numerous charges and countercharges of cutting over the line between the two owners, the Saunders family in Livermore and James Everell Henry in Lincoln. In addition, it was difficult to haul timber over the ridge crest. Eventually a settlement was reached by which the New Hampshire legislature redrew the town boundary to run along the ridge crest, with the Lincoln portion defined as that part of the territory that is drained by the East Branch of the Pemigewasset River and the Livermore portion as that drained by other rivers. This definition produced a peculiar result: there is a small piece of Livermore at the head of the Little River valley (part of the Ammonoosuc River drainage) that is not contiguous to the rest of the town - it is, in fact, 4.8 miles (7.7 km) from the nearest corner of the main part of the town and, therefore, forms an exclave. Since this fragment and all lands bordering it are now part of the White Mountain National Forest, this historical peculiarity no longer has any practical consequences.

The curving northwestern border of the township follows the height of land between the drainage of the East Branch of the Pemigewasset River to the west and the headwaters of the Sawyer River and the Swift River to the east, as well as tributaries of the Pemigewasset River to the south. Important summits along the border (from northeast to southwest) include Mount Bemis, at 3,706 feet (1,130 m) above sea level; Mount Lowell, at 3,743 feet (1,141 m); Mount Carrigain, the highest point in Livermore at 4,700 feet (1,400 m); Mount Kancamagus, at 3,728 feet (1,136 m); and Mount Osceola, at 4,326 feet (1,319 m).

Two roads cross the township of Livermore, although neither one is close to the site of Livermore village. The Kancamagus Highway (New Hampshire Route 112) crosses Kancamagus Pass (2,855 ft or 870 m) on the Lincoln/Livermore boundary and passes through several miles of the southeastern part of Livermore to a point just west of Sabbaday Falls. The Tripoli Road (not usually maintained for winter travel), which runs from the northern tip of Thornton through Thornton Gap to Waterville Valley, crosses the southwest corner of the township.

== Demographics ==
Historical population
Census	Pop.	Note	%±
1880	103		—
1890	155		50.5%
1900	191		23.2%
1910	64		−66.5%
1920	98		53.1%
1930	23		−76.5%
1940	4		−82.6%
2000	3		—
2010	0		−100.0%
2020	2		—
U.S. Decennial Census

As of the census of 2020, there were two people living in the township.

Historical census figures are shown in the adjacent table. As a logging town where most of the actual logging was done in the winter by transient men hired for the season only, ascertaining the actual population of Livermore at any given time would have been problematic, and these census figures may have been influenced by how these transients were counted.

== History ==
The following is a summary of Livermore's history:

- 1874 - Grafton County Lumber Co. incorporated by the Saunders family.
- 1875 - Sawyer River Railroad incorporated.
- 1876 - Livermore incorporated. First mill is constructed and burns down later in the year.
- 1877 - Construction of Sawyer River Railroad begins to support logging activity.
- 1880 - Smallpox epidemic kills 6 townspeople.
- 1881 - Livermore post office is established.
- 1885 - Town reports having one school with a population of 28 students.
- 1890 - Town records indicate mill ownership changed from the Saunders family to George P. James.
- 1891 - Charles Saunders dies. His brother, Daniel Saunders, and Daniel's son, Charles G. Saunders, continue to oversee operations.
- 1895 - George P. James sells his portion of Livermore back to the Saunders family, specifically Charles G. Saunders.
- 1896 - Topographic map shows railroad and twelve inhabited buildings.
- 1898 - Telephone service established.
- 1901 - Over half of Livermore is annexed to Lincoln by State Legislature.
- 1910 - Fire tower constructed at peak of Mt. Carrigain.
- 1912 - C. G. Saunders mortgages Livermore Mills to Gideon M. Sutherland.
- 1918 - C. G. Saunders dies. His three sisters inherit nearly all of his estate, while mill operations is passed to an officer for the Saunders interests, Clinton I. Nash.
- 1919 - A fire destroys Livermore Mills.
- 1920 - The original locomotive derails, falls into Sawyer River, and is subsequently replaced.
- 1922 - New reconstructed mill is completed.
- 1924 - New school is completed, employing two teachers for approximately 20 students.
- 1927 - A November storm devastates the town. The mill is severely damaged and a large section of the railroad bed is washed away.
- 1928 - The last mill is closed.
- 1929 - Clinton Nash inquires with the United States Forest Service about selling the Saunders sisters' Livermore holdings to the Forest Service.
- 1931 - The post office is closed.
- 1937 - All but one 12-acre (4.9 ha) parcel of land is sold to the Forest Service for inclusion in the White Mountain National Forest. The remaining parcel was retained by the Saunders sisters, along with their mansion.
- 1944 - A two-story home, a boarding house, and remaining sawmill equipment are auctioned off by the government.
- 1947 - The locomotive is sold by the Forest Service.
- 1949 - The last two residents leave town.
- 1951 - Livermore dissolved by an act of the New Hampshire legislature. During the same year, the Saunders sisters' 12 acres are passed to Clinton Nash.
- 1963 - Clinton Nash's Livermore holdings, including the Saunders mansion, are sold to a couple from Conway, Robert and Bessie Shackford.
- 1964 - Clinton Nash dies.
- 1965 - Robert Shackford burns down the Saunders mansion after getting tired of constant vandalism and destruction of the property.
- 1970s - Bill defeated in State House for Lincoln to annex Livermore.

Diatomaceous earth—also called tripolite—was once mined in Little East Pond and processed in a mill located in the southwestern part of Livermore township. The Tripoli Road received its name from this mill. The USFS Little East Pond Trail follows for some distance the grade of the old railroad that served the mill, and the ruins of the mill can still be found by following the line of the railroad grade into the woods for a short distance. However, this mill was far from the village of Livermore and was historically more identified with Thornton.

== See also ==
- List of ghost towns in New Hampshire
- Samuel Bemis
