= Sawyer River =

- The Sawyer River near its mouth. Former Mountain Division railroad bridge in front; U.S. Route 302 bridge in back.

- Location within New Hampshire Location within the United States

Location
- Country: United States
- State: New Hampshire
- Counties: Grafton, Carroll
- Towns: Livermore, Harts Location

Physical characteristics
- Source: Hancock Notch
  - location: Sandwich
  - coordinates: 44°3′17″N 71°29′11″W
  - elevation: 2,680 ft (820 m)
- Mouth: Saco River
  - location: Harts Location
  - coordinates: 44°5′10″N 71°20′46″W
  - elevation: 827 ft (252 m)
- Length: 9.1 mi (14.6 km)

The Sawyer River is a 9.1-mile-long (14.6 km) river in the White Mountains of New Hampshire in the United States. It is a tributary of the Saco River, which flows to the Atlantic Ocean in Maine.

The Sawyer River rises in the unincorporated township of Livermore, New Hampshire, on the eastern side of Hancock Notch, a pass in the Pemigewasset Wilderness between Mount Hancock to the north and Mount Huntington to the south. The river flows east, paralleled by the Hancock Notch Trail, into a broad valley with Mount Carrigain to the north and the smaller summit known as Greens Cliff to the south.

The river turns northeast, with Carrigain Brook joining from the north and the outlet of Sawyer Pond joining from the south, and enters a deeper, narrower mountain valley as it descends to Crawford Notch. The river is paralleled in this lower section by the Sawyer River Road, a gravel Forest Service access road open to the public May–October. The Sawyer River enters the town of Hart's Location and ends at the Saco River near its great bend to the east as it leaves Crawford Notch.

== See also ==
- List of rivers of New Hampshire
- Sawyer River Railroad
