= Treadwell-Sparks House =

Historic house in Massachusetts, United States

- U.S. National Register of Historic Places
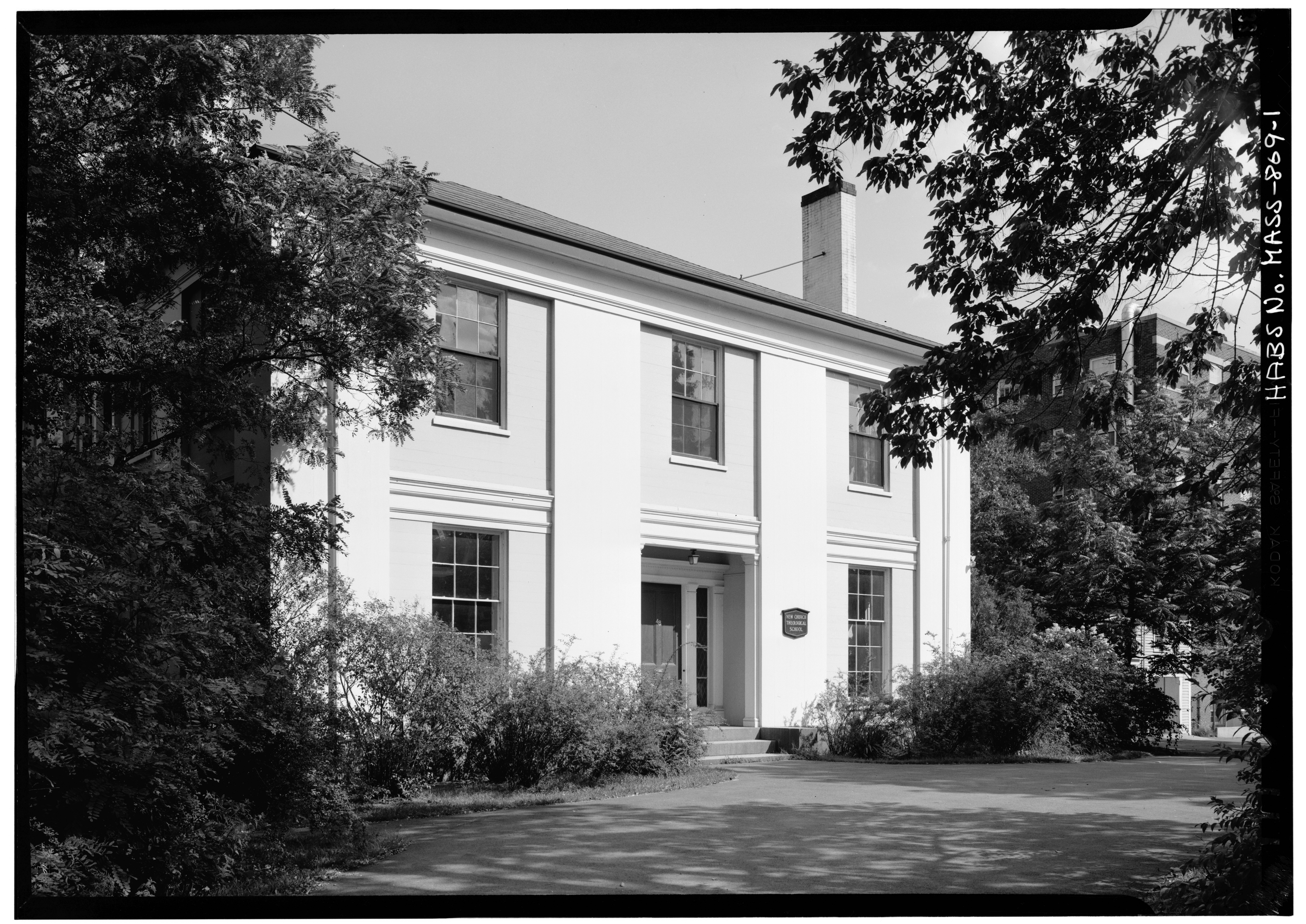

- Location within Massachusetts Location within the United States
- Location: 21 Kirkland St., Cambridge, Massachusetts
- Coordinates: 42°22′36″N 71°6′56″W
- Built: 1838; 188 years ago
- Built by: William Saunders
- Architectural style: Early Republic, Greek Revival
- MPS: Cambridge MRA
- NRHP reference No.: 86002078
- Added to NRHP: September 12, 1986

The Treadwell-Sparks House is an historic house at 21 Kirkland Street in Cambridge, Massachusetts. Built in 1838, it is a good local example of Greek Revival architecture, further notable as the home of historian Jared Sparks. Now owned by Harvard University, it was moved to its present location in 1968, and is used for professor housing. The house was listed on the National Register of Historic Places in 1986.

== Description ==
The Treadwell-Sparks House stands on the north side of Kirkland Street, opposite Harvard's Memorial Hall. It is a two-story wood-frame structure, with a hip roof and brick chimneys. It is oriented with a sidewall facing the street, and its main facade to the east. The street-facing facade is characterized by unusually wide plain pilasters and flushboarding, while the formal front is finished in wooden clapboards. It is roughly square in plan, with three bays on each side.

== History ==
The house was built, originally on nearby Quincy Street, in 1838 by housewright William Saunders for Harvard Professor Daniel Treadwell. The house was purchased in 1848 by Nathaniel Silsbee for his daughter, who was married to historian Jared Sparks.

The house was purchased from Sparks' heirs by the New Church Theological School and served as the New England training center for Swedenborgian ministers. In 1901 Langford Warren, architect and member of the General Convention of the New Jerusalem (Swedenborgian), designed and oversaw the construction of a chapel, rotating the house and moving it a short distance on its lot.

In the 1960s, the building was sold back to Harvard and the New Church Theological School moved to Newton. The structure was moved in 1968 about 100 yards (91 m) from its original site at 48 Quincy Street to its current location at 21 Kirkland Street in order to make room for the construction of Gund Hall. The move included moving the property's carriage house, and carefully preserved its original orientation to the street.

The house now serves as the private residence of Harvard University's Plummer Professor of Christian Morals.

== See also ==
- National Register of Historic Places listings in Cambridge, Massachusetts
