= William Saunders (builder) =

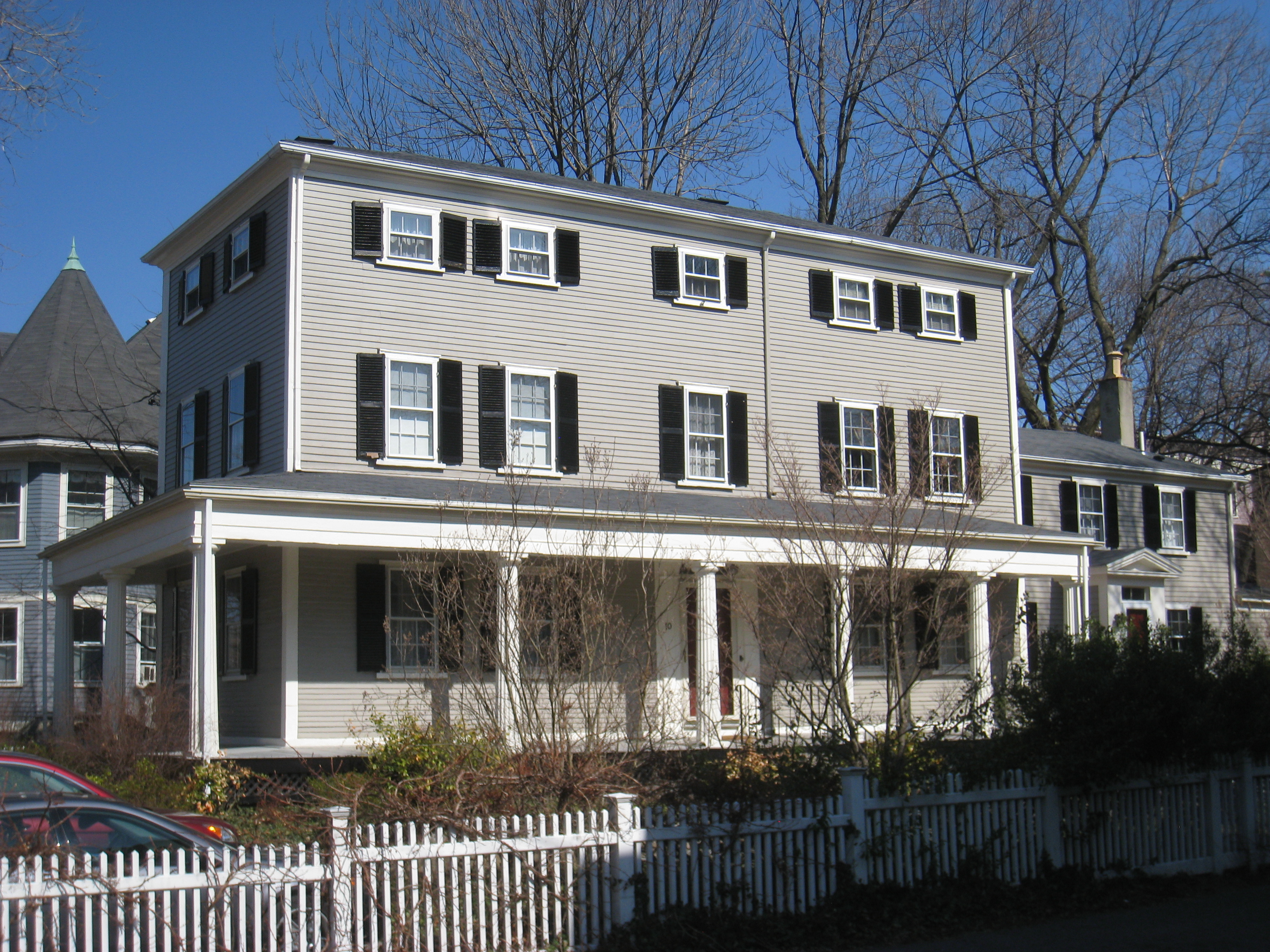
Walter Frost House, Cambridge, Massachusetts

William Saunders (1787-1861) was an American housewright. A number of his works are listed on the U.S. National Register of Historic Places.

== Works include ==
- Abbot Hall, historic Abbot Academy campus, now part of the Phillips Academy campus, Andover, MA
- Walter Frost House, 10 Frost St. Cambridge, MA, NRHP-listed
- William Saunders House, 6 Prentiss St. Cambridge, MA, NRHP-listed
- Treadwell-Sparks House, 21 Kirkland St. Cambridge, MA, NRHP-listed
