= William Saunders House =

Historic house in Massachusetts, United States

- U.S. National Register of Historic Places
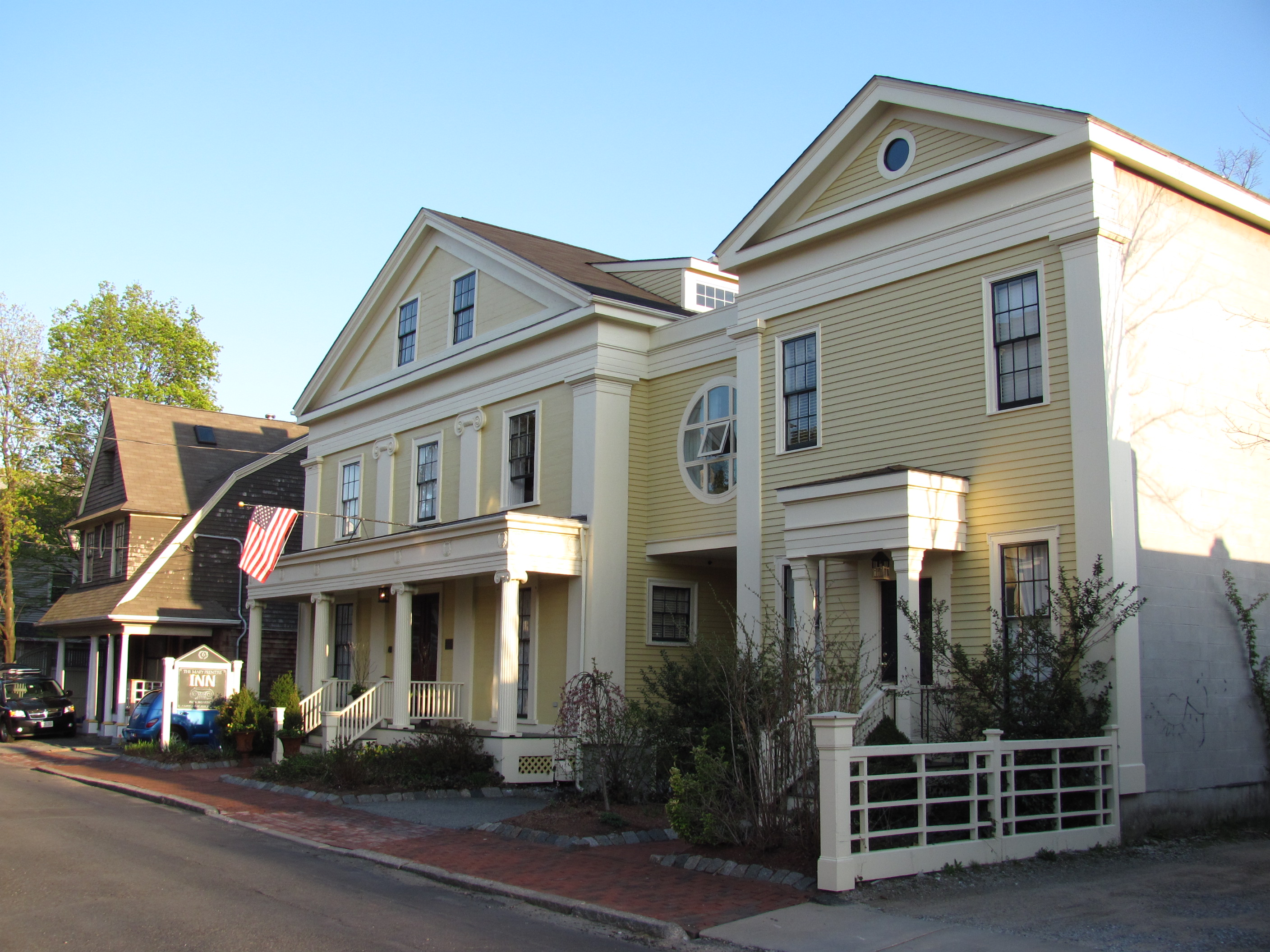
- William Saunders House

- Location within Massachusetts Location within the United States
- Location: Cambridge, Massachusetts
- Coordinates: 42°23′3.4″N 71°7′7.8″W
- Built: 1843
- Architect: Saunders, William
- Architectural style: Greek Revival
- MPS: Cambridge MRA
- NRHP reference No.: 83000825
- Added to NRHP: June 30, 1983

The William Saunders House is an historic house at 6 Prentiss Street in Cambridge, Massachusetts. It is a 2 1/2-story wood-frame structure, three bays wide, with a front-facing gable roof. Two-story pilasters separate the bays, and there is an entablature below the fully pedimented gable. A single-story porch extends across the facade. The house was built by housewright William Saunders for his son, also named William. The Saunders family resided at the home for 55 years. Originally located on Massachusetts Avenue, it was moved to its present location in 1926.

The house was listed on the National Register of Historic Places in 1983. It served as a nursing home for a time in the 20th century, and is now operated as the Mary Prentiss Inn.

== See also ==
- National Register of Historic Places listings in Cambridge, Massachusetts
