= Sawyer River Railroad =

Lumber railroad in New Hampshire, U.S. (1877-1928)

Overview
- Headquarters: Livermore
- Locale: White Mountain National Forest
- Dates of operation: 1877–1928

Technical
- Track gauge: 4 ft 8 1/2 in (1,435 mm) standard gauge
- Length: 9 miles (14 km)

The Sawyer River Railroad was a lumber railroad that operated along the Sawyer River in Livermore, New Hampshire from 1877 until 1928, when all rail traffic ceased.

By comparison with other logging roads of the day in the White Mountains, this was a small one, running only eight or so miles up the narrow valley of the Sawyer River above Bartlett at the south end of Crawford Notch. It connected to the Portland and Ogdensburg Railway below Crawford Notch.

== History ==
The Sawyer River Railroad was chartered by the Saunders family in 1875. The Saunders owned the vast old-growth forest in the Sawyer River valley, and had just founded the new village of Livermore with a large sawmill. The railway bought its first locomotive new in late 1876.

Construction began in 1877, beginning with the 2 miles between Livermore and the Portland and Ogdensburg Railway. The railway was expanded into the woods beginning in 1880 to bring fresh cut logs to the mill. The railway never had a passenger car, but Livermore's residents would ride on the locomotive's slopeback tender.

As was typical for logging railways of the era, the construction was cheap and accidents were frequent. The lone locomotive on the line suffered 33 derailments and repeatedly needed a new cab or a new tender. In 1920, an especially bad fall into the river occurred and the locomotive was replaced.

The railway lasted a long time for a logging line, until a major flood destroyed all but 4 miles in 1927. By that time, the valley had been heavily logged out anyway. All rail traffic ceased in 1928. The railway was disassembled in the mid 1930s by the Civilian Conservation Corps.

== Locomotives ==
Name	Type	Weight	Builder	Builder number	Build date	Cylinders	Driver size	Notes
C. W. Saunders	0-4-0	30 short tons (27,000 kg)	Portland Company	346	1876	15 inches (38 cm)×16 inches (41 cm)	48.5 inches (123 cm)	Wrecked 1920
James E. Henry	2-4-2T	25 short tons (23,000 kg)	Baldwin Locomotive Works	7794	1886	14 inches (36 cm)×24 inches (61 cm)	44 inches (110 cm)	Bought used from the Conway Company. Scrapped 8 years after last run.
