= Mary Prentiss Inn =

Coordinates: 42°23′04″N 71°07′08″W

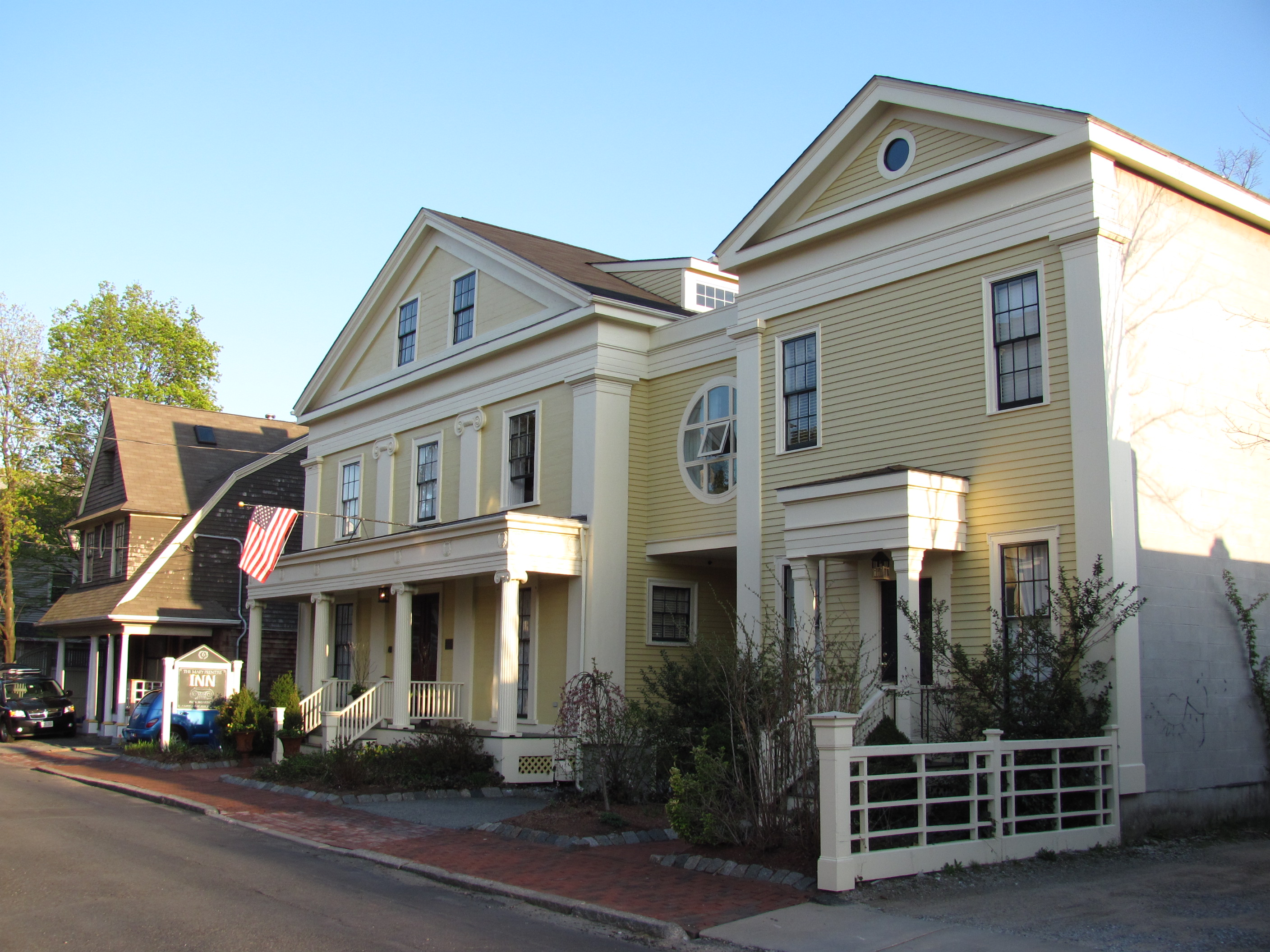
Mary Prentiss Inn

Prentiss House (formerly known as The Mary Prentiss Inn) has historic roots that reach as far back as 1843 and has transformed from a home on Prentiss Street to a Cambridge, Massachusetts inn.

In 1843 the home was built by architect William A. Saunders as a wedding gift to his son, William, and his wife, Mary Prentiss. The home was built in the Neo-classical design during the popular Greek revival of 19th century in the United States of America. The Saunders family resided at the home for 55 years. The building is on the U.S. National Register of Historic Places as the William Saunders House.

The hotel had been a long-time home to the Saunderses and Taylor family, as well as a hostelry and nursing home. In December 1991, a local artist, Charlotte Forsythe bought the home and began the journey of transforming the home into the Mary Prentiss Inn.

In 2021, BREC LLC, a Boston-based development company, purchased the inn to update the property and to improve the guest experience while maintaining the quaint and private nature of the former inn.

To this day, Prentiss House remains on the National Register of Historic Places and is recognized as a landmark by the Cambridge Historical Commission.

== Resources ==
Prentiss House

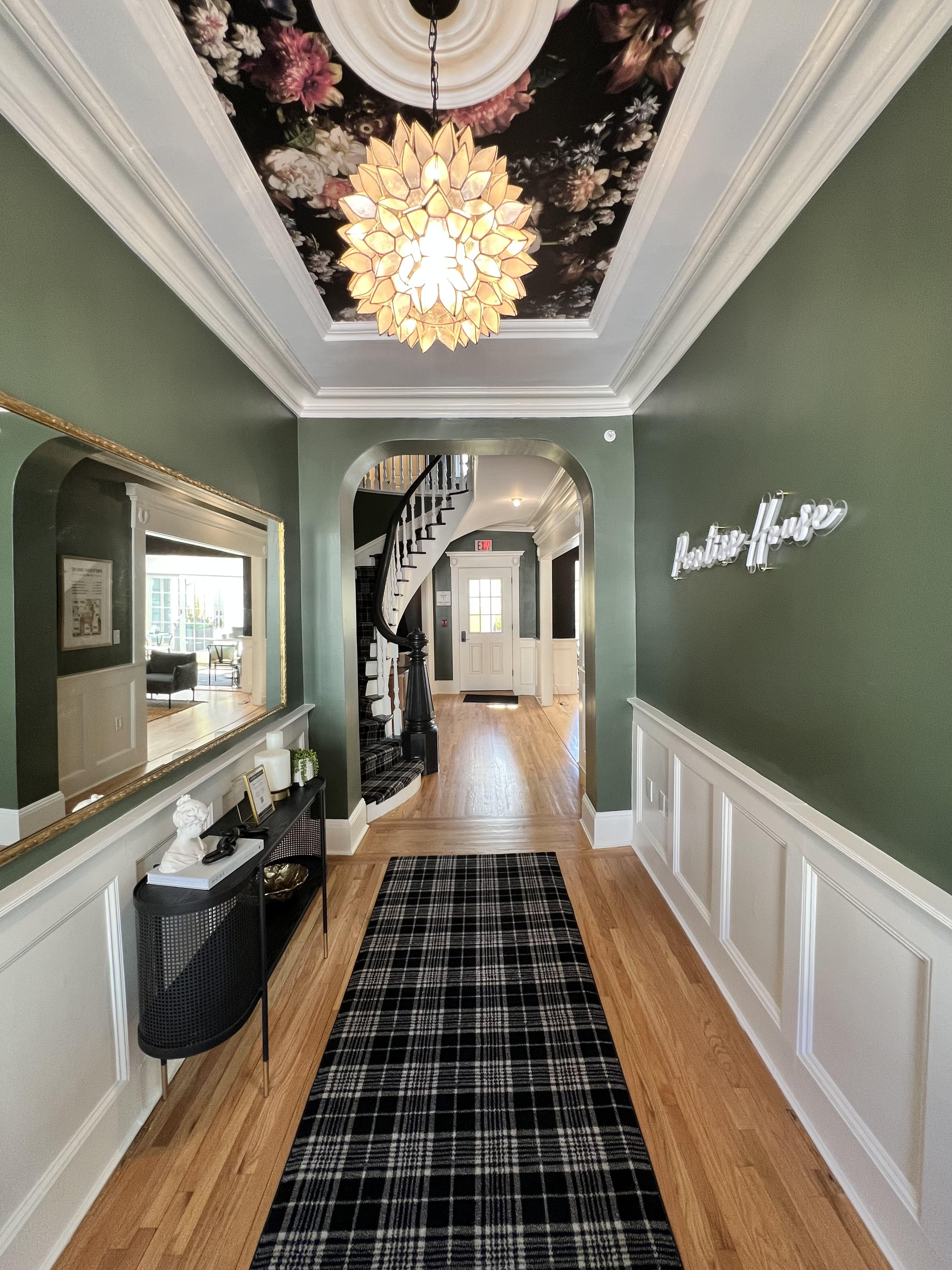
Prentiss House interior

Historic Makeover/Prentiss House
