= USS Ossipee (WPG-50) =

Patrol vessel of the United States Navy

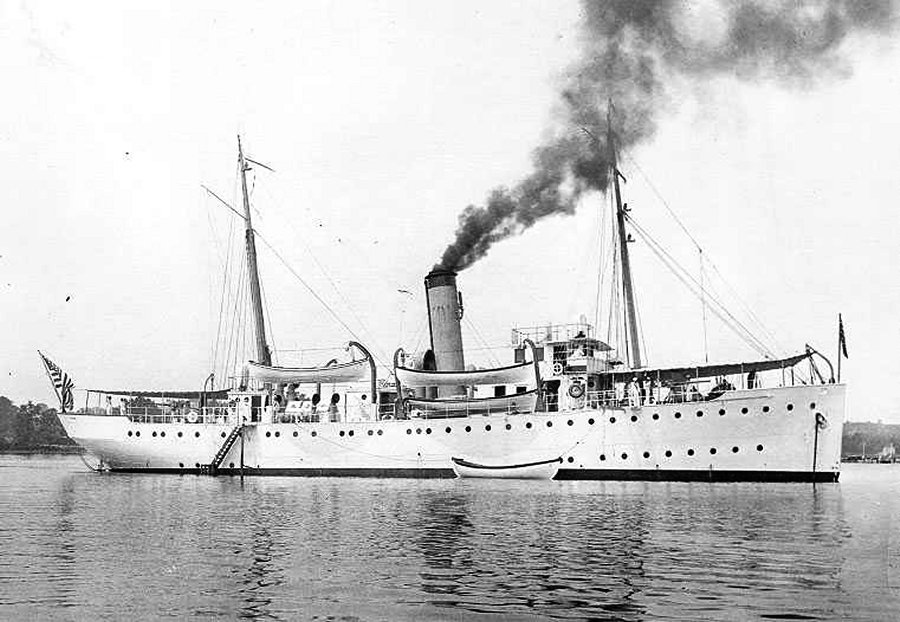

History

United States
- Name: USS Ossipee
- Namesake: The Ossipee River in eastern New Hampshire and southwestern Maine
- Builder: Newport News Shipbuilding and Drydock Corporation
- Launched: 1915
- Completed: 1915
- Acquired: 6 April 1917
- Commissioned: 28 July 1915 (into U.S. Coast Guard)
- Decommissioned: 12 June 1945
- Fate: Sold 18 September 1946
- Notes: Served in U.S. Coast Guard 1915-1917 and 1919-1941, and in U.S. Navy 1917-1919 and 1941-1945

General characteristics
- Type: United States Coast Guard Cutter
- Displacement: 908 long tons (923 t)
- Length: 165 ft 10 in (50.55 m)
- Beam: 32 ft 0 in (9.75 m)
- Draft: 11 ft 9 in (3.58 m)
- Speed: 13 knots
- Complement: 60
- Armament: 4 × 3 in (76 mm) guns

The second USS Ossipee (WPG-50) was a United States Coast Guard cutter that served in the Coast Guard from 1915 to 1917, in the United States Navy from 1917 to 1919, in the Coast Guard again from 1919 to 1941, and in the Navy again from 1941 to 1945.

Ossipee, built by Newport News Shipbuilding and Drydock Corporation, Newport News, Virginia, as a cruising cutter, was launched in 1915. Accepted by the United States Government on 10 July 1915, she commissioned on 28 July 1915. She arrived at Portland, Maine, on 17 August 1915 and commenced coastal patrol and rescue operations in the U.S. Coast Guard in a cruising district from Eastport, Maine, to Cape Ann, Massachusetts.

Transferred to the U.S. Navy by an Executive Order of 6 April 1917 for service in World War I, Ossipee was assigned to Squadron Two, Division Six, Atlantic Patrol Forces. She arrived at Gibraltar on 30 August 1917, and assumed convoy escort duty between Gibraltar and the United Kingdom. She also took part in anti-submarine operations in the Mediterranean Sea. The cutter cruised in the war zone from 23 August 1917 until 11 November 1918, during which time she assisted in the escort of 596 merchant ships, only five of which were lost to submarine action.

Ossipee returned to the control of the Department of the Treasury for Coast Guard service in accordance with an Executive Order of 28 August 1919. Upon return to the United States, she resumed patrol and rescue operations out of Portland, Maine. She also helped to reinaugurate the cruises of the International Ice Patrol in the winter of 1920–1921. During Prohibition in the United States, the cutter was called upon to serve as an occasional unit of the Coast Guard's seagoing force that battled the "rum-runners".

Ossipee continued coastal patrol, rescue, and navigational aid service operations out of Portland, Maine, through 1935. Transferred to Great Lakes duty in 1936, she was assigned to Sault Ste. Marie, Michigan. By the time of her second transfer to the Navy on 1 November 1941, she was carried on the Coast Guard Register as a "miscellaneous cutter." Her World War II operations consisted of Lake Erie patrols out of Cleveland, Ohio.

Ossipee decommissioned on 12 June 1945 and was sold on 18 September 1946 to Harold H. Neff of East Cleveland, Ohio.
