= USS A. G. Prentiss =

Tugboat of the United States Navy

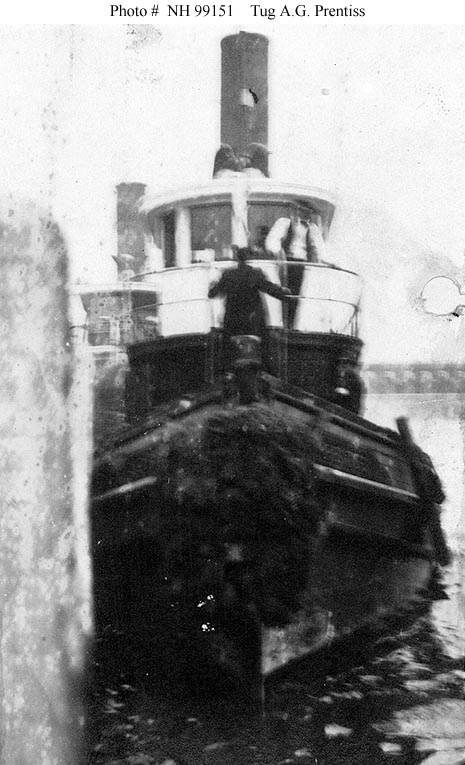
- A. G. Prentiss before her service in the United States Navy.

History

United States
- Name: A. G. Prentiss
- Namesake: Alfred G. Prentiss
- Owner: Alfred G. Prentiss; Saco River Towing Company
- Route: Saco River, Maine
- Builder: Charles Ward Shipyard, Kennebunk, Maine
- Launched: 6 February 1912
- In service: 25 March 1918
- Out of service: 2 December 1918
- Identification: Official number: 209585; ID# 2413

General characteristics
- Tonnage: 46 GRT
- Displacement: 130 long tons (130 t)
- Length: 76 ft (23 m) length overall; 68 ft 9 in (21.0 m) length between perpendiculars
- Beam: 17 ft 2 in (5.2 m)
- Draft: 7 ft (2.1 m)
- Depth: 7 ft 4 in (2.2 m)
- Installed power: 1 boiler; 160 ihp (120 kW)
- Propulsion: 1 single cylinder, steam engine,
- Speed: 9 kn (17 km/h; 10 mph)
- Crew: Civilian: 3; Navy: 6
- Armament: None

A. G. Prentiss (Id. No. 2413) was the 46 GRT wooden-hulled commercial vessel A. G. Prentiss launched 6 February 1912, by the Charles Ward Shipyard in Kennebunk, Maine, registered with official number 209585, for passenger service with home port at Saco, Maine. The vessel was named for Alfred G. Prentiss, owner of other tugs and a grain and groceries business. Despite the odd registration as "passenger" service when "tow" is one of the options, the vessel was well documented as a tug boat operating on the Saco River in Maine.

== Service history ==
The United States Navy inspected her in the 3rd Naval District on 6 March 1918, and selected her for service. A. G. Prentiss was delivered to the Navy on 25 March 1918, under a charter approved three days later. Navy references do not indicate commissioning and thus the ship did not bear the United States Ship (U.S.S.) honorific.

A. G. Prentiss apparently served in the 3rd Naval District for her entire career, as she is listed as having that area as her duty station in the 1918 Ship's Data volume. However, there are no extant deck logs to confirm this inference. Records indicate that A. G. Prentiss was returned to her owner on 2 December 1918, and her name stricken from the Navy list the same day.

In the 1919 register the vessel is shown as a tow boat with New York, N.Y. as port of registry. Later registers show the tug owned by the Saco River Towing Company with home port of Portland, Maine. The last register in which the tug appears under "Steam Vessels" with a descriptive line is the 1935–1936 volume. From that point on the name and official number only appear under an index of managing owners. (Note: The vessel ceases to have a line under Steam in the 1937 register. A check of vessels abandoned, wrecked or unrigged, numbered but not documented, in that register failed to show either the number or name. The number and name do appear in the Index of Managing Owners under the Saco River Towing Company, Biddeford, Maine, in that register and registers in subsequent years show different managing owners. Exactly why a vessel would remain in the registers only under managing owners into the 1960s while not otherwise being listed is not clear.)

On 15 April 1923 the steamer Annahuac ran onto Fortune's Rocks and was salvaged by tugs A. G. Prentiss, Cumberland and the revenue cutter Ossipee. The salvage fee was disputed, but the tugs were awarded $9,000 each. The tug was reportedly active into World War II, reportedly towing targets for a coastal battery, and also being wrecked and burned.

As late as 1961, a vessel with official number 209585 named A. G. Prentiss appears in Merchant Vessels of the United States only under "Index of Managing Owners" with managing owner being Peerless #One Corp., (N.J.), 36 New Street, East Boston, Massachusetts. The vessel does not otherwise appear in the registry. She was converted from steam to diesel (An 1879 Buda) and was owned by Esterhill in East Boston, then sold to Boston Fuel on 36 New Street in East Boston in the early 1950s (Related to Esterhill)

== Sources ==
- Bureau of Navigation (1913). Forty-Fifth Annual List of Merchant Vessels of the United States, Year ended June 30, 1913. Washington, D.C.: Department of Commerce and Labor, Bureau of Navigation. p. 102.
- Construction & Repair Bureau (Navy) (November 1, 1918). Ships' Data U.S. Naval Vessels. Washington D.C.: U.S. Government Printing Office. pp. 576–581.
- DANFS. "A. G. Prentiss". Dictionary of American Naval Fighting Ships. Naval History And Heritage Command.
