= Saunders family =

Prominent American family

Saunders
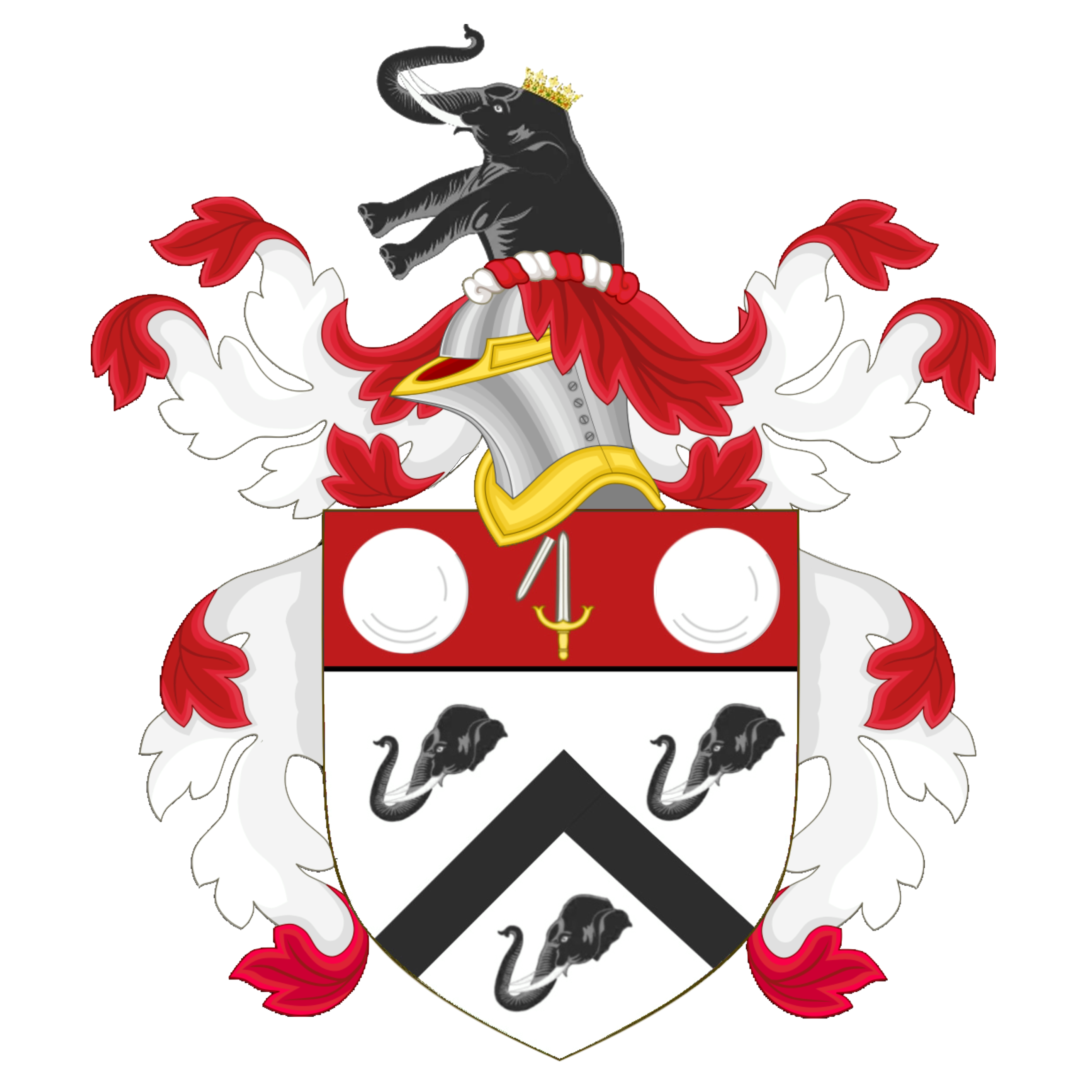
- Current region: East Coast of the United States
- Origin: United Kingdom (England)
- Founded: 15th century
- Estates: Pitchcott Manor; Saunders-Willard House; William Saunders House

The Saunders family is an American family of important industrialists and politicians.

== History ==
The earliest documented member of the family is William Saunders (c. 1430 - 1488) of Amersham, a cap-maker and dyer. The Saunders family had many branches in England, with movement and inter-marriage between them. Members were known to be very wealthy landowners who inherited or bought manors and were involved in the cloth trade in some way – as cap-makers, dyers, or cloth merchants. Members of the family were educated, with several graduates from the University of Oxford and Cambridge.

The Saunders first appeared in North America in the 17th century with Tobias Saunders, whose Amersham origin is disputed. Members held political positions in New England, and the family played an integral role in the foundation of Salem, New Hampshire, Lawrence, Massachusetts, and Westerly, Rhode Island. The village of Saunderstown, Rhode Island, was named in honor of John Aldrich Saunders, who settled there in 1856.

== Industry ==
=== Grafton County Lumber Company ===
Daniel Saunders Jr. and Charles W. founded the Grafton County Lumber Company in 1874. While the company office and sales department was in Boston, the logging operations centered about Livermore, New Hampshire and included the Sawyer River Railroad and a large sawmill. Every building in Livermore belonged to the Saunders, along with 30,000 acres of timberland. Daniel gave up his share in the company in 1880 to his son Charles G. After the death of Charles G. Saunders, the inheritance passed to his three sisters. Logging and sawmill operations continued until 1928, and the mostly-logged out land was sold to the U.S. Forest Service in 1935.

=== E. A. Saunders & Sons ===
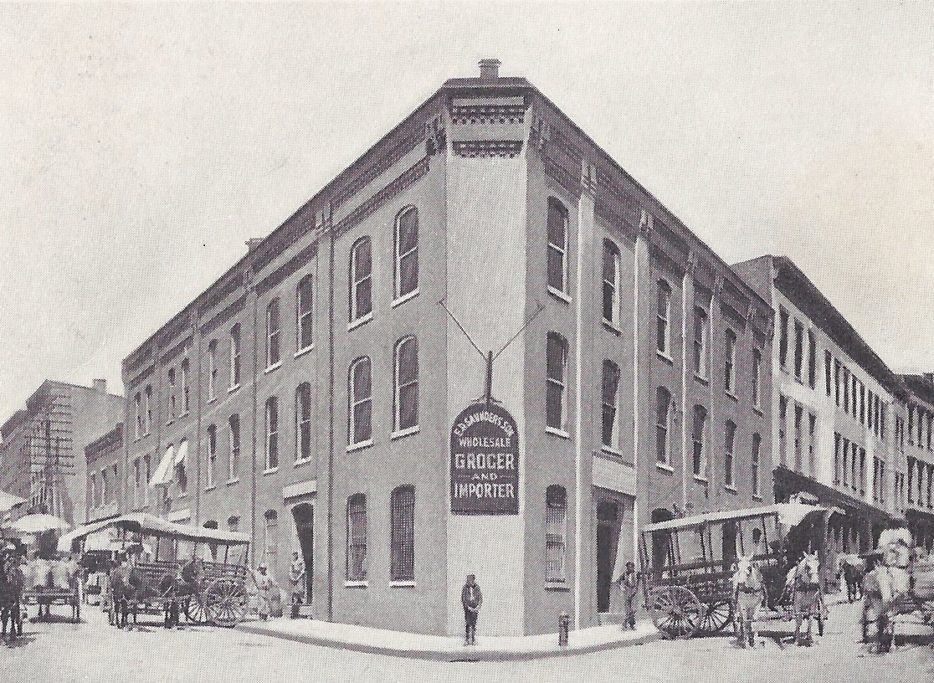
E. A. Saunders & Sons, circa 1903

In 1861, E. A. Saunders, Sr., founded the E. A. Saunders & Sons, Wholesale Grocer and Importer Company. It specialized in fine cigars and tobacco manufacturers’ supplies. Prior to its establishment, E. A. Saunders, Sr. worked as a country merchant in New Kent County, Virginia. He was involved in the Grafton County Lumber Company and owned vessels, city real estate, farms, plantations and bank stock to a considerable amount. The company acted as a sole proprietorship from 1876 to 1883, and then his son, E. A., Jr., acquired an interest with him. In 1890 another son, W. B. was admitted, and the three constituted the firm. At its height, the company had several locations throughout Virginia, and was believed to have surpassed $1 million in sales a year ($38 million in 2026).

== Notable members ==
- Tobias Saunders (c. 1620 – 1695) was a Deputy to the Rhode Island General Assembly (1669, 1671, 1672, 1680, 1681, 1683, and 1690), a Conservator of the Peace (1669, 1678, and 1695) and a founding settler of Westerly, Rhode Island.

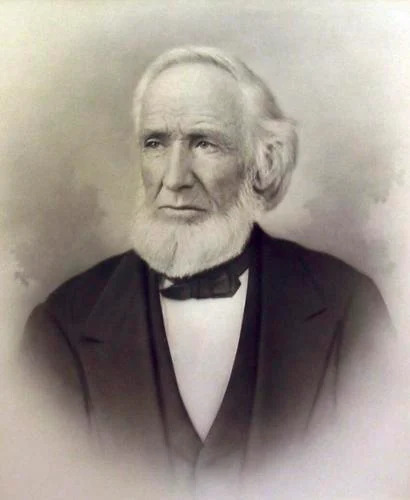
Daniel Saunders Sr.

- Daniel Saunders Sr. (June 20, 1796 – October 8, 1872) was born in Salem, New Hampshire. His youth was spent in both Salem and Canada. He entered the textile industry as a teen-aged apprentice. After a stint as foreman at the Abbott Mills in Andover, Massachusetts, he became connected with North Andover Mills. Then Saunders built his own small mill in Andover, and in 1840 he purchased mills in Concord, New Hampshire. In 1843 he sold the New Hampshire mills and the one in Andover in preparation for an even bigger enterprise. Daniel Saunders' new textile mill near Andover was the foundation for the new city of Lawrence, Massachusetts. Daniel Sr. was also rumored to have been involved in the Underground Railroad. The Daniel Saunders Elementary School is named after him.
- Daniel Saunders Jr. was a son of Daniel Saunders Sr. He was born in Andover, Massachusetts, and graduated from Harvard College in 1844. He married a Mary Livermore (not Mary Livermore), granddaughter of Samuel Livermore. Daniel Jr. was a lawyer and the 6th mayor of Lawrence, from 1860 to 1861, as a Democrat.
- Caleb Saunders was a son of Daniel Saunders Sr. He was born in North Andover, Massachusetts, and graduated from Bowdoin College in 1859. He was the 19th mayor of Lawrence in 1877, as a Democrat.
- Charles Wesley Saunders (d. 1891) was a son of Daniel Saunders Sr. and the son-in-law of Nicholas Gaubert Norcross.
- Charles Gurley Saunders (ca. 1848–1918) was the son of Daniel Saunders Jr.
- Edith Saunders was one of three daughters of Daniel Saunders Jr.

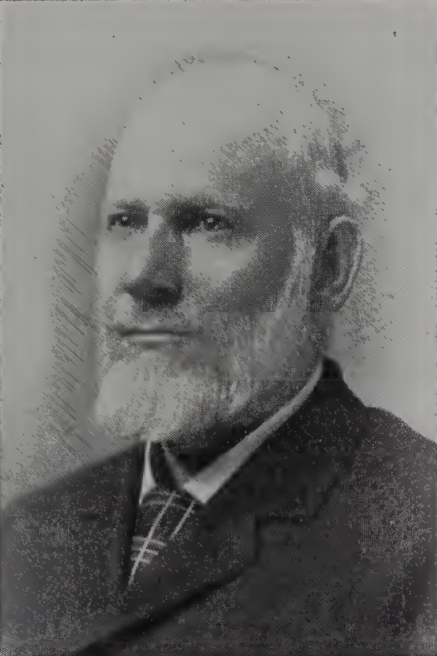
Edmund A. Saunders

- Edmund A. Saunders was a successful entrepreneur involved in the E. A. Saunders & Sons, Wholesale Grocer and Importer Company and the Grafton County Lumber Company. Saunders was a component of the tobacco manufacturing concern of Hardgrove, Pollard and Company as well as a part of the firm of E. A. Saunders and Company of New York, which dealt in the Cord-Wood and Lumber Association of Virginia.
