= Walter Frost (footballer) =

English footballer

Personal information
- Full name: Walter Frost
- Date of birth: 21 March 1873
- Place of birth: Great Bradley, England
- Date of death: 1955 (aged 81–82)
- Position: Winger

Senior career*
Years	Team	Apps	(Gls)
1892–1893	Middlesbrough		
1893–1894	South Bank		
1894–1895	Grimsby Town	14	(5)
1895–1897	Middlesbrough		
1897	Grimsby Town	2	(0)
1897–1???	Middlesbrough		
- * Club domestic league appearances and goals

Walter Frost (21 March 1873 – 1955) was an English footballer who played as a winger.
