= Walter Frost House =

Historic house in Massachusetts, United States

- U.S. National Register of Historic Places
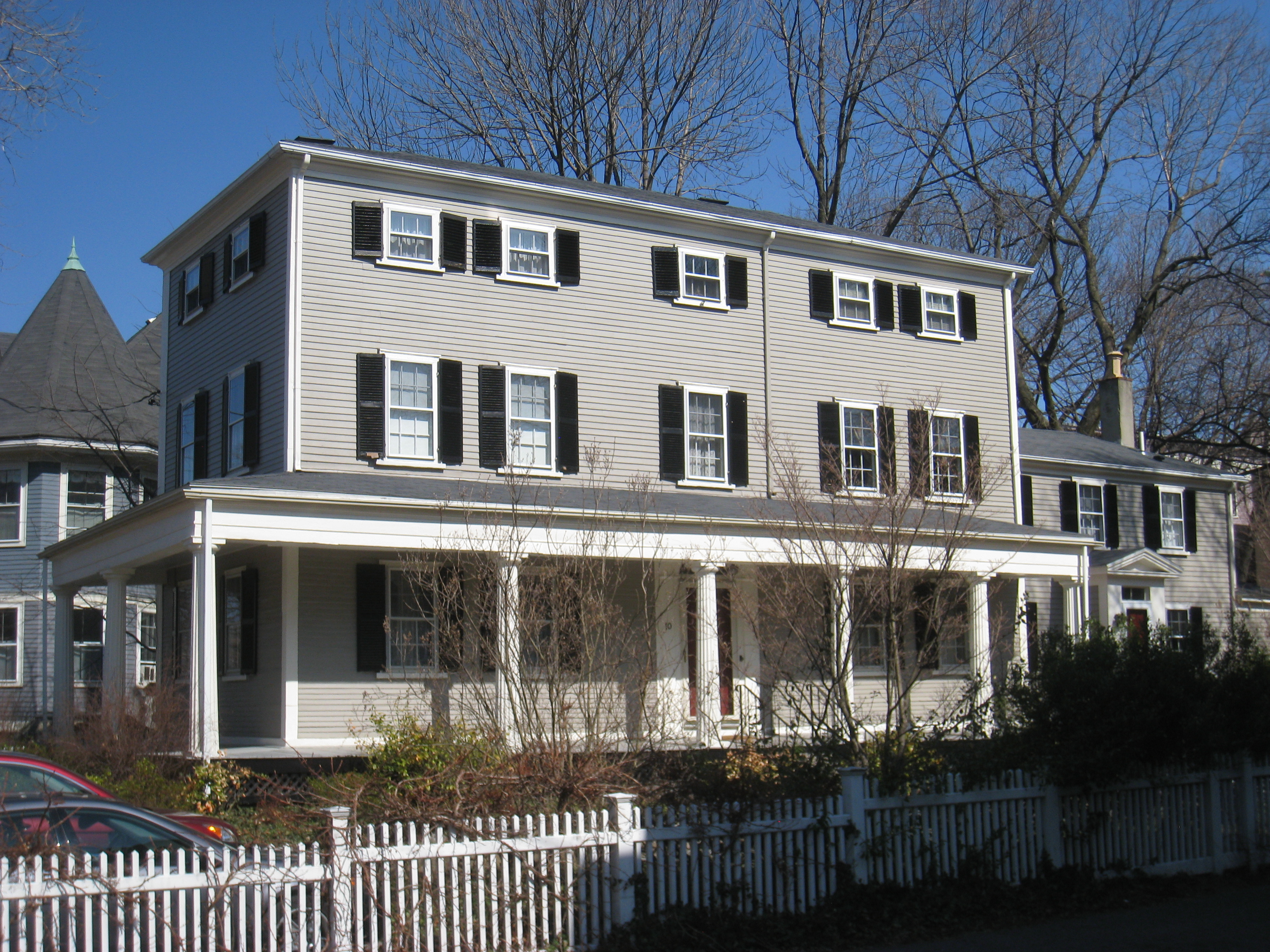

- Location within Massachusetts Location within the United States
- Location: Cambridge, Massachusetts
- Coordinates: 42°23′9.7″N 71°7′2.0″W
- Built: 1807
- Architect: Saunders, William
- Architectural style: Federal
- MPS: Cambridge MRA
- NRHP reference No.: 82001942
- Added to NRHP: April 13, 1982

The Walter Frost House is an historic house at 10 Frost Street in Cambridge, Massachusetts. The three-story wood-frame house was built in 1807, and was originally located on Massachusetts Avenue. The Federal style house was moved to its present location in 1866 to make way for the North Avenue Congregational Church, which was moved to its site.

The house was listed on the National Register of Historic Places in 1982.

== See also ==
- National Register of Historic Places listings in Cambridge, Massachusetts
