= USS Prentiss (AKA-102) =

Cargo ship of the United States Navy

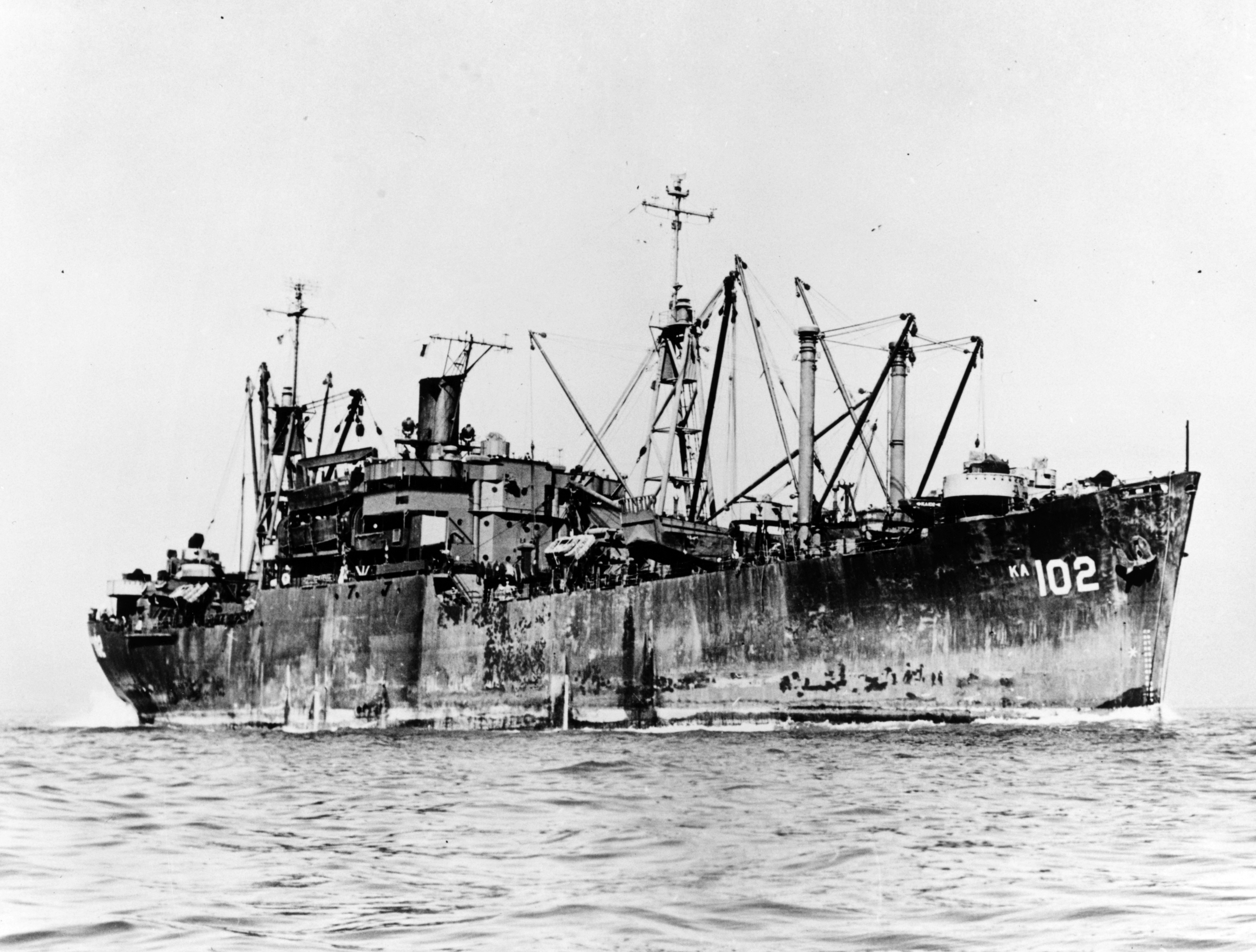

History

United States
- Name: USS Prentiss
- Namesake: Prentiss County, Mississippi
- Builder: North Carolina Shipbuilding Company, Wilmington, North Carolina
- Laid down: 10 October 1944
- Launched: 6 December 1944
- Acquired: 12 January 1945
- Commissioned: 11 February 1945
- Decommissioned: 31 May 1946
- Renamed: Alcoa Ranger; Cortez; Jody Re
- Stricken: 19 June 1946
- Honors and awards: 1 battle star (World War II)
- Fate: Sold into merchant service, 1947; Scrapped, March 1970

General characteristics
- Class & type: Tolland-class attack cargo ship
- Displacement: 8,635 long tons (8,774 t) light; 13,910 long tons (14,133 t) full
- Length: 459 ft 2 in (139.95 m)
- Beam: 63 ft (19 m)
- Draft: 26 ft 4 in (8.03 m)
- Propulsion: GE geared turbine drive, single propeller, 6,000 shp (4.5 MW)
- Speed: 16 knots (30 km/h; 18 mph)
- Complement: 425
- Armament: 1 × 5"/38 caliber gun; 4 × twin 40 mm guns; 18 × 20 mm guns

USS Prentiss (AKA-102) was a Tolland-class attack cargo ship in service with the United States Navy from 1945 to 1946. She was sold into commercial service and was scrapped in 1970.

== History ==
Prentiss was named after Prentiss County, Mississippi. She was laid down as a Type C2-S-AJ3 ship under a United States Maritime Commission contract (MC hull 1699) by the North Carolina Shipbuilding Co., Wilmington, North Carolina, on 10 October 1944; launched on 6 December 1944; sponsored by Mrs. Roger Williams; acquired on loan charter basis from the Maritime Commission by the Navy on 12 January 1945; and commissioned on 11 February 1945.

=== World War II, 1945 ===
After shakedown in the Chesapeake Bay area, Prentiss sailed from Norfolk for Pearl Harbor, arriving on 13 April. She departed Hawaii on 6 May with ammunition and general cargo for Okinawa. Within hours of her arrival on 21 June, she underwent one of that area's frequent attacks. During the action her gunners shot down a kamikaze. Following this spirited reception, unloading of her volatile cargo was speedy; she departed the area on 27 June. Returning to San Francisco on 28 July, she remained on the west coast until after the end of hostilities.

=== Post-war service 1945–46 ===
She then loaded general cargo and sailed for Pearl Harbor and the southwest Pacific. Between October 1945 and February 1946 she carried cargo between the Philippines, the Netherlands East Indies, and Australia.

=== Decommissioning and sale ===
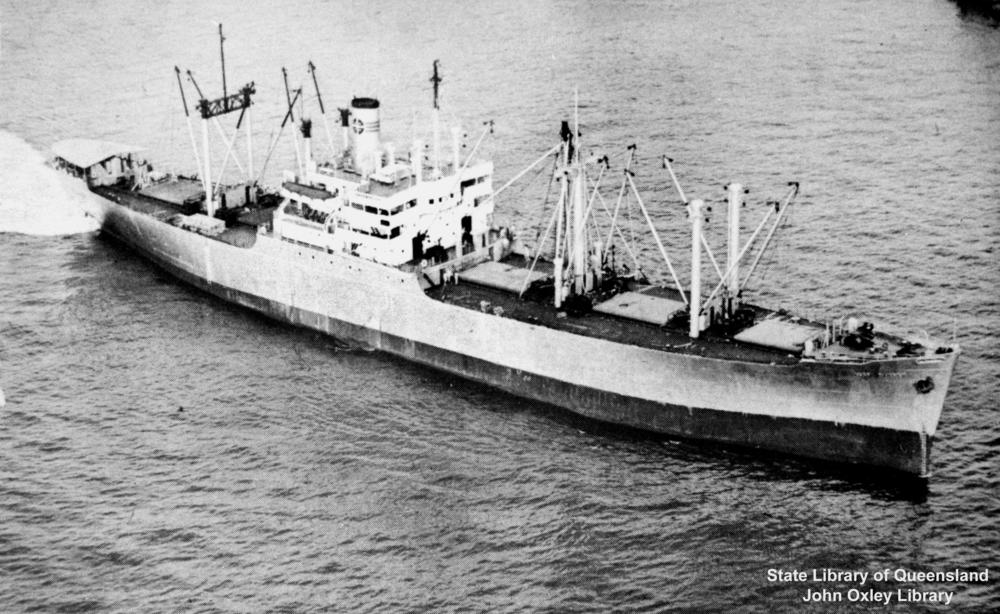
The ship as Alcoa Ranger

Returning to the US, she was decommissioned on 31 May 1946, was returned to the War Shipping Administration on 1 June 1946, and was struck from the Navy List on 19 June 1946.

On 15 October 1947 the Maritime Administration sold the ship to the Aluminum Company of America, who renamed her Alcoa Ranger. A little less than two decades later, the Cortez Shipping Corporation bought her and renamed her Cortez. Cortez Shipping sold her on 13 May 1969 to Crest Overseas Shipping Company, who renamed her Jody Re on 26 November 1969. On 18 December 1969 she ran aground off the coast of Nicaragua while en route from Lake Charles, Louisiana to Saigon (now known as Ho Chi Minh City), South Vietnam. The damaged ship was towed to Mobile, Alabama for possible repair but it was assessed to be uneconomical to repair her. She was sold for scrap on 18 March 1970, towed across the Atlantic Ocean, and scrapped at Bilbao, Spain.

== Awards ==
Prentiss was awarded one battle star for World War II service.
