= Grand Trunk railway stations =

Grand Trunk railway stations or Grand Trunk railroad stations may refer to former and active passenger rail stations built for the Grand Trunk Railway or its subsidiaries the Grand Trunk Western Railroad and the Grand Trunk Pacific Railway.

In the United States, some of these stations are listed on the National Register of Historic Places (NRHP).

== In Canada ==
(by province)

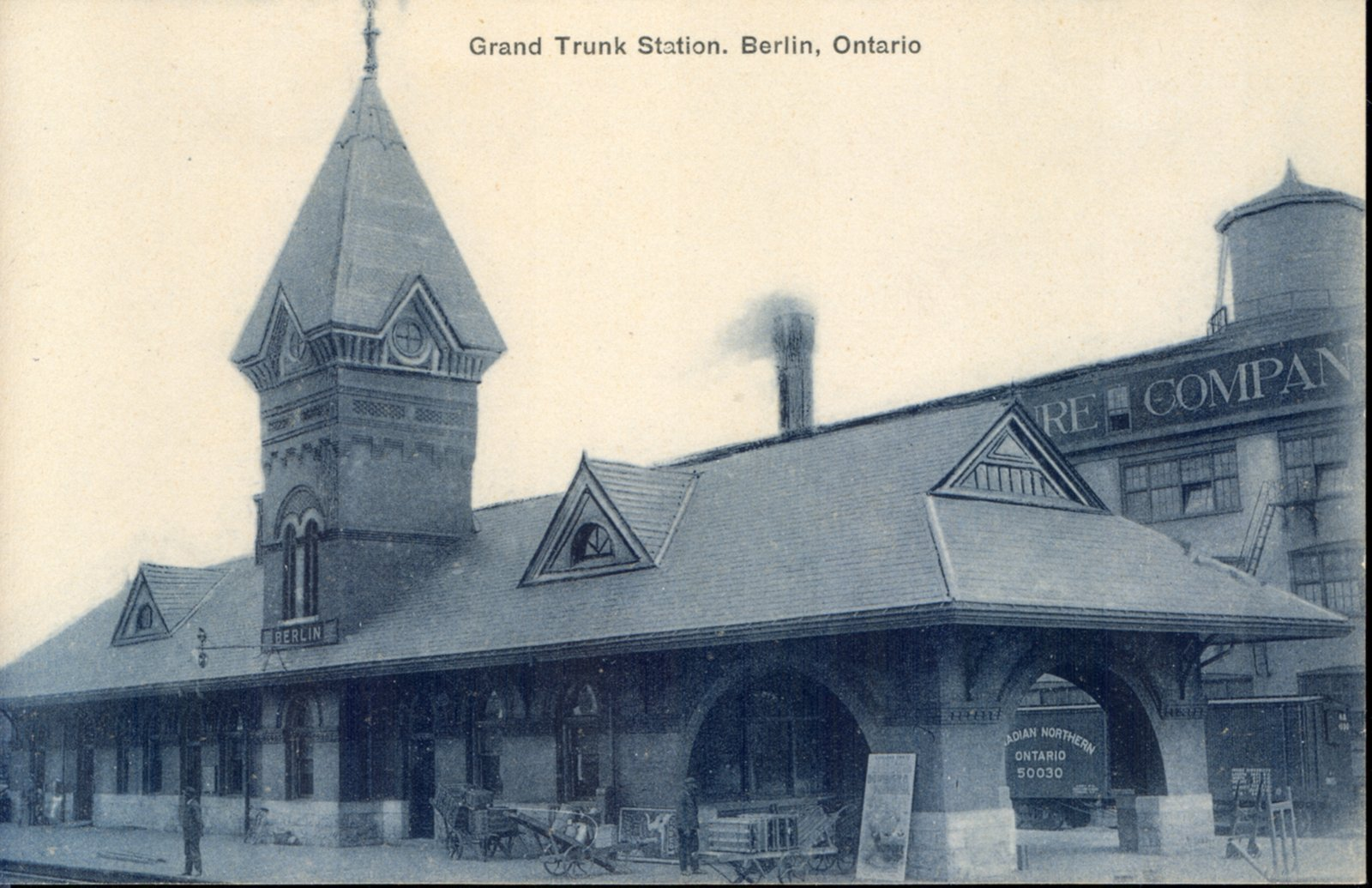
Grand Trunk station, Berlin, Ontario

- Grand Trunk Pacific station (Dunster), Dunster, British Columbia
- Grand Trunk station (Caledonia), Caledonia, Ontario
- Grand Trunk station (Hamilton), Hamilton, Ontario
- Grand Trunk station (Berlin, ON), Kitchener, Ontario
- Grand Trunk station (Napanee), Napanee, Ontario
- Grand Trunk station, (Niagara Falls), Niagara Falls, Ontario
- Grand Trunk station, (Parkdale), Parkdale, Toronto, Ontario
- Grand Trunk station, (Riverdale), Toronto, Ontario
- Grand Trunk station, (Uxbridge), Uxbridge, Ontario
- Grand Trunk station (Weston), Weston, Ontario
- Grand Trunk station (Coaticook), Coaticook, Quebec
- Grand Trunk station (Richmond), Richmond, Quebec
- Grand Trunk Pacific station (Biggar), Biggar, Saskatchewan

== In the United States ==
(by state)

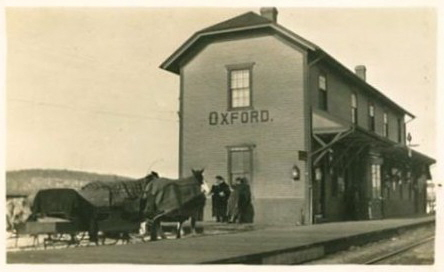
Grand Trunk station, Oxford, Maine

- Grand Trunk station (Bethel), Bethel, Maine
- Grand Trunk station (Lewiston), listed on the NRHP in Maine
- Grand Trunk station (Mechanic Falls), Mechanic Falls, Maine
- Grand Trunk station (Oxford, Maine), Oxford, Maine
- Grand Trunk station (Portland), Portland, Maine
- Grand Trunk station (South Paris), South Paris, Maine
- Grand Trunk station (Yarmouth), Yarmouth, Maine, listed on the NRHP
- Grand Trunk station (Battle Creek), Battle Creek, Michigan
- Grand Trunk station (Detroit), Detroit, Michigan
- Grand Trunk station (Durand), Durand, Michigan, listed on the NRHP
- Grand Trunk Western station (Lansing), Lansing, Michigan, listed on the NRHP
- Grand Trunk station (Port Huron), Port Huron, Michigan
- Grand Trunk station (Berlin, New Hampshire), Berlin, New Hampshire
- Grand Trunk station (Gorham), Gorham, New Hampshire
- Grand Trunk station (Island Pond), Island Pond, Vermont
