= South Paris station (Grand Trunk) =

South Paris
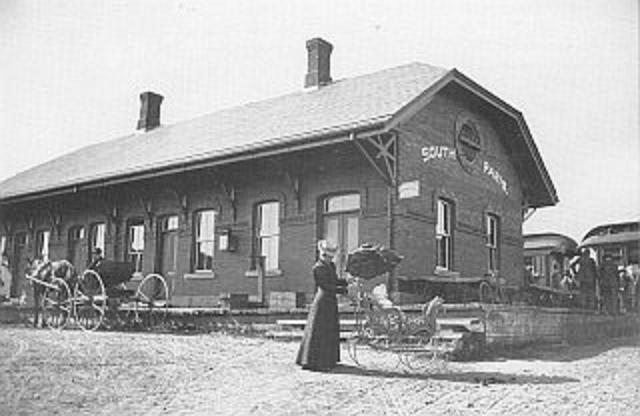
- The station in 1895

General information
- Location: South Paris, Maine; United States.
- Coordinates: 44°13′18″N 70°30′53″W

Construction
- Structure type: one floor

Other information
- Status: restored

History
- Opened: 1883
- Closed: 1965
- Former names: Grand Trunk Railroad

Former services
Preceding station	Canadian National Railway	Following station
Bates toward Montreal	Montreal – Portland	Oxford toward Portland
Norway Terminus	Norway Branch	Terminus
Route map
Location

The South Paris station was a historic railroad station in South Paris, Maine. The station was built in 1883 by the Grand Trunk Railroad linking South Paris with Montreal and Portland, Maine. Trains began regular operation between Portland and the depot on the Paris side of the town line with Oxford at Widow Merrill's crossing October 8, 1849, even though the station was listed as "North Oxford" in timetables. The first train into South Paris village was a contractor's engine called the Jenny Lind on January 1, 1850. It ran carefully across temporary bridgework up to where the station was being built, as a means of satisfying the investors worries from Paris Hill to counter their threat of withdrawing their support and money if there was not a train in the village proper on that date (an engine operating by itself without cars met the ruling of a train). The Androscoggin bridge was completed March 15, 1850, with regular service to Portland from the present day station grounds to Portland beginning on the 18th. On December 30, 1879, the Norway Branch Railroad opened, running from Norway village on a line 1.45 miles long to connect with the Grand Trunk Railroad at South Paris.

== See also ==
- Grand Trunk railway stations (disambiguation), other stations of the Grand Trunk Railway and its subsidiaries
