= Berlin station (New Hampshire) =

American railroad station

Berlin
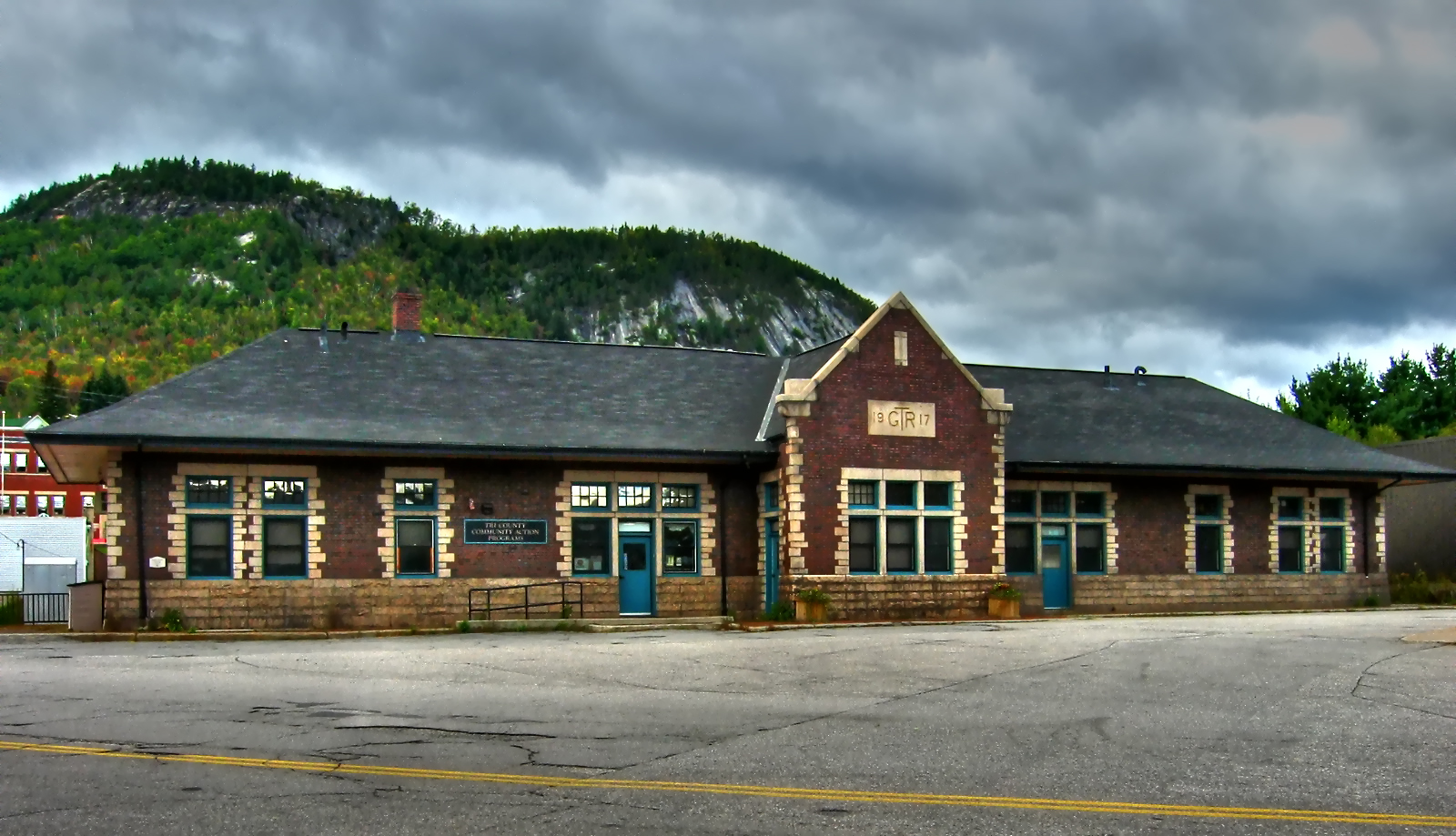

General information
- Location: Berlin, New Hampshire; United States
- Coordinates: 44°28′05″N 71°11′08″W

Construction
- Structure type: Single-story stone building

History
- Opened: 1917
- Closed: 1968

Former services
Preceding station	Canadian National Railway	Following station
Copperville toward Montreal	Montreal – Portland	Gorham toward Portland
Route map
Location

Berlin station is a railroad station in Berlin, New Hampshire, United States. It was built in 1917 by the Grand Trunk Railway, long after the arrival of the Railroad in 1845, the reason being that Berlin was not on the railroad's main line further south at Gorham, New Hampshire.

== History ==
The St. Lawrence and Atlantic Railroad was chartered in Maine on February 10, 1845. Montreal businessmen obtained a charter for the St. Lawrence & Atlantic Railroad on March 17, 1845. Together, the two companies proposed to construct a railroad between Montreal and Portland across the province of Quebec and the states of Vermont, New Hampshire, and Maine.

Directors of the St. Lawrence and Atlantic Railroad broke ground in Portland on July 4, 1846. It took until July 22, 1851, for construction to allow the first train to enter Gorham, New Hampshire, which represented over 91 miles (146 km) of track reaching to within 5 miles (8 km) of Berlin. Construction resumed and reached the town of Northumberland, New Hampshire, on July 12, 1852, passing through the new Berlin station en route. Meanwhile, the St. Lawrence & Atlantic built southeastward from Montreal, and the two companies had agreed on August 4, 1851, to join at the town of Island Pond, Vermont. The first regularly scheduled through train between Montreal and Portland operated on April 4, 1853. Meanwhile, the directors had negotiated the joining of the two railroads between Portland and Montreal into the Grand Trunk Railway Company of Canada, which they accomplished through a 999-year lease dated August 5, 1853, but retroactive to July 1, 1853, roughly three months after completion of the through railway. Thus Berlin, New Hampshire, took its place on the map of railroad stations in the United States, for the first several months as part of the Atlantic & St. Lawrence and thereafter as a stop on the Grand Trunk Railway.

== See also ==
- Grand Trunk railway stations (disambiguation)
