= Yarmouth station (Maine) =

- Grand Trunk railroad station
- U.S. National Register of Historic Places
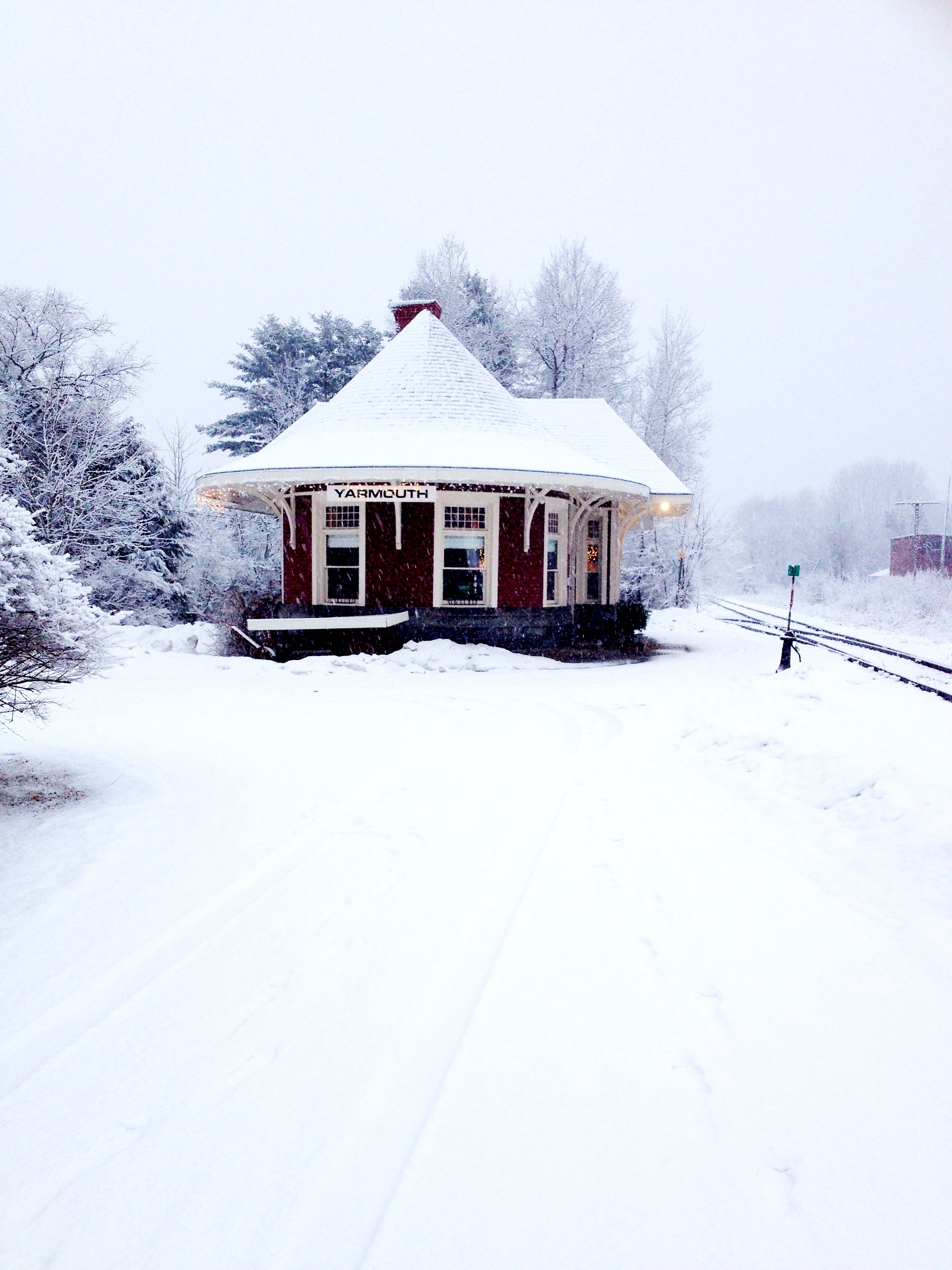
- 2014 view

- Location within Maine Location within the United States
- Location: 288 Main Street, Yarmouth, Maine
- Coordinates: 43.8016717°N 70.1906447°W
- Area: 0.3 acres (0.12 ha)
- Built: 1906
- NRHP reference No.: 79000139
- Added to NRHP: July 10, 1979

Yarmouth station of Yarmouth, Maine, is located on the east side of the railroad tracks, just south of Maine State Route 115, the town's Main Street. The railroad station was built in 1906 by the Grand Trunk Railroad, and is a well-preserved example of an early 20th-century passenger rail depot, an increasingly rare sight in the state. The building, which is now in commercial use, was added to the National Register of Historic Places on July 10, 1979.

== Description and history ==
Yarmouth's former Grand Trunk station stands just south of SR 115, on the east side of the Maine Central Railroad tracks. (The Amtrak Downeaster service between Portland and Brunswick runs on the Boston and Maine Railroad line, which crosses this track just to the north. It does not stop in Yarmouth.) The station is a single-story wood-frame structure, set on a high granite block foundation. It has a hip roof and clapboard siding, and is roughly rectangular in shape, with small projecting sections on the either side, and a semicircular northern end. The roof has extended eaves, in a form typical of many railroad stations, with the eaves supported by large decoratively-cut brackets.

The station was built in 1906 by the Grand Trunk Railway as a passenger depot on its line between Portland and Montreal. (There were three lines in total at the time of the station's construction.) It is architecturally unique in Maine, particularly for its high granite base, apsoidal curved end, and departure from more traditional Stick style architecture. The Yarmouth Village Improvement Society purchased the station from the Grand Trunk's successor Canadian National Railway for $500 in 1968 to save it from demolition. It housed a florist until February 2018, when it was put on the market for $165,000. It is now occupied by a branch of Maine Community Bank.

The apsidal form of its northern end is found in no other Maine station. The waiting room for the station stood on the land now occupied by Hancock Lumber (formerly Yarmouth Market) and Bank of America, as denoted by a plaque in the flowerbed of the properties.

== See also ==
- Grand Trunk railway stations (disambiguation), other stations of the Grand Trunk Railroad and its subsidiaries
- National Register of Historic Places listings in Cumberland County, Maine
- Historical buildings and structures of Yarmouth, Maine

Preceding station	Canadian National Railway	Following station
Yarmouth Junction toward Montreal	Montreal – Portland	Falmouth toward Portland
