= Mechanic Falls station =

Mechanic Falls
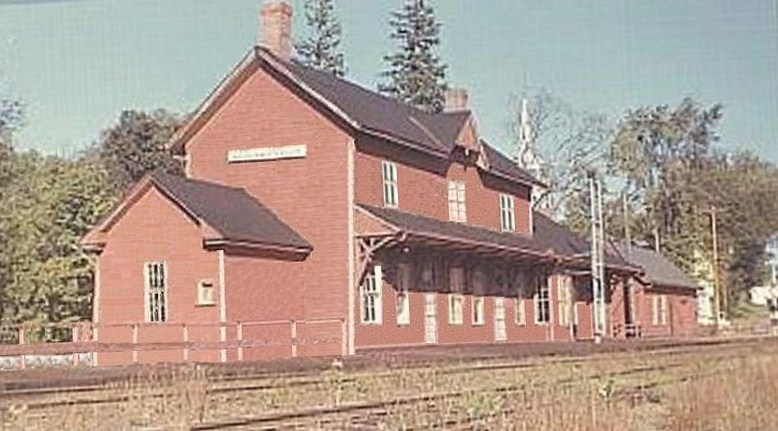
- View of station in 1967

General information
- Location: 63 Elm Street; Mechanic Falls, Maine; United States.
- Coordinates: 44°06′34″N 70°23′21″W

Construction
- Structure type: two floors

Other information
- Status: demolished

History
- Opened: 1883
- Closed: 1965
- Former names: Grand Trunk Railroad

Former services
| Preceding station | Canadian National Railway | Following station |
|---|---|---|
| Oxford toward Montreal | Montreal – Portland | Empire Road toward Portland |
Route map
Location

The Mechanic Falls station was a historic railroad station in Mechanic Falls, Maine. The station, located on Elm Street, was built in 1883 by the Grand Trunk Railroad linking Mechanic Falls with Montreal and Portland, Maine. The village was named Mechanic Falls in honor of mechanics who worked there during the industrial revolution. The village grew especially after the arrival of the St. Lawrence & Atlantic Railroad toward the end of 1840. The railroad opened the village to several business ventures between Portland and Montreal.

After the cessation of rail services at the station in 1965, it was demolished in 1968. Only the storage depot survived, and is now inhabited as a residence.

== Gallery ==
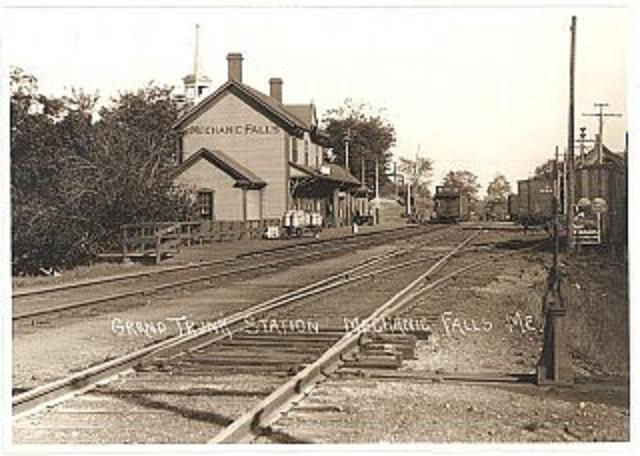
Grand Trunk station in 1913

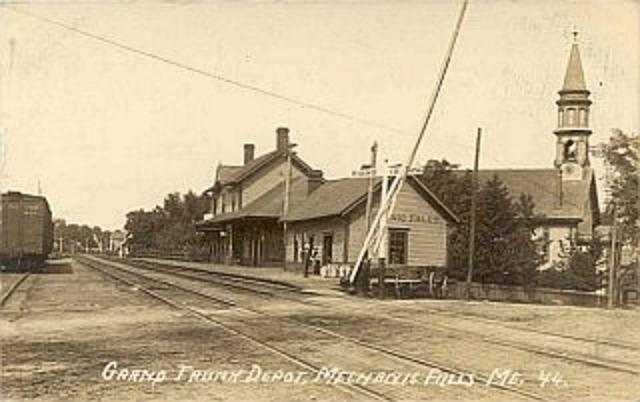
Grand Trunk depot in 1913

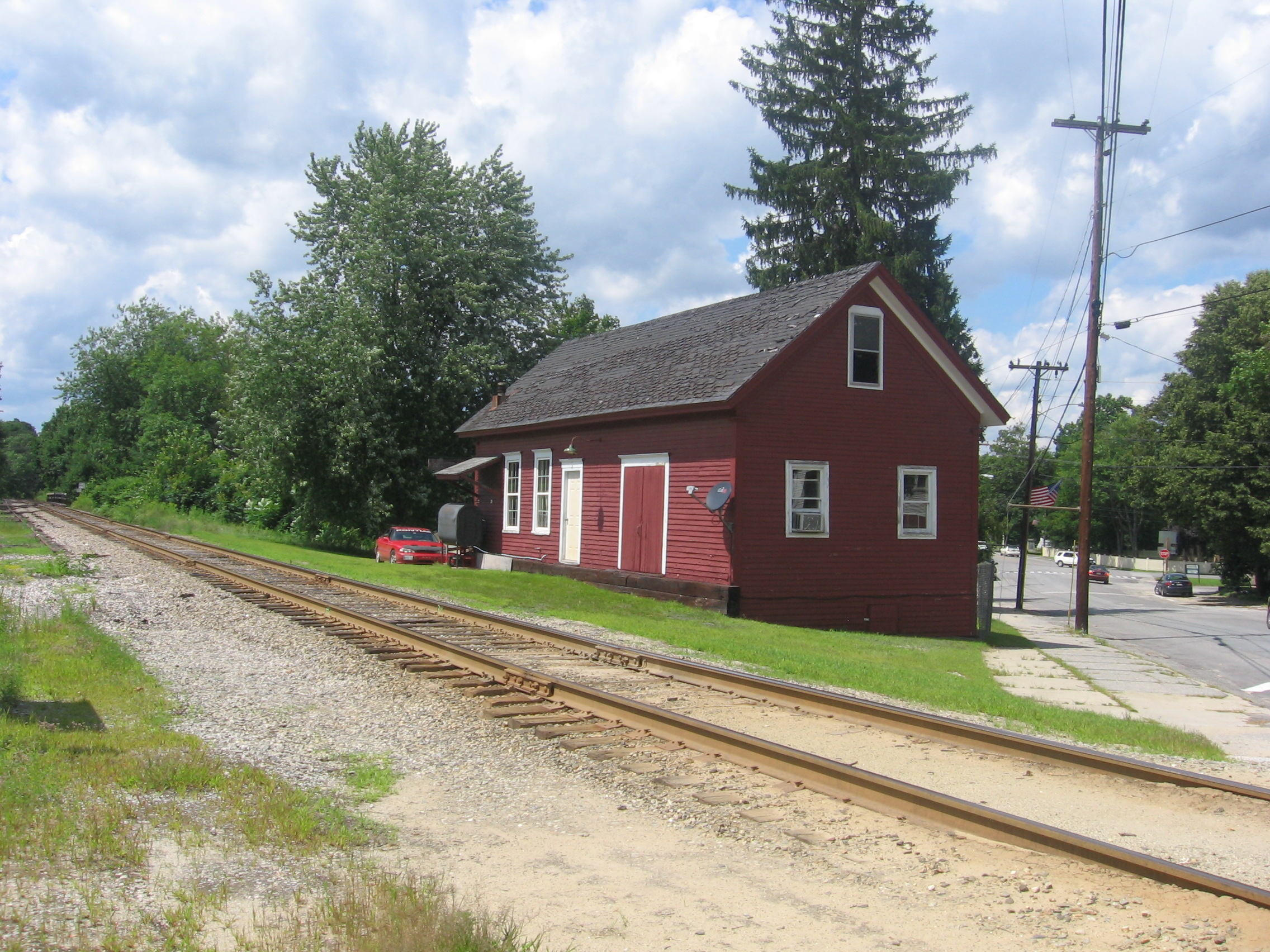
Grand Trunk depot today

== See also ==
- Grand Trunk railway stations (disambiguation), other stations of Grand Trunk Railway and its subsidiaries
