= Island Pond station =

Train station

Island Pond
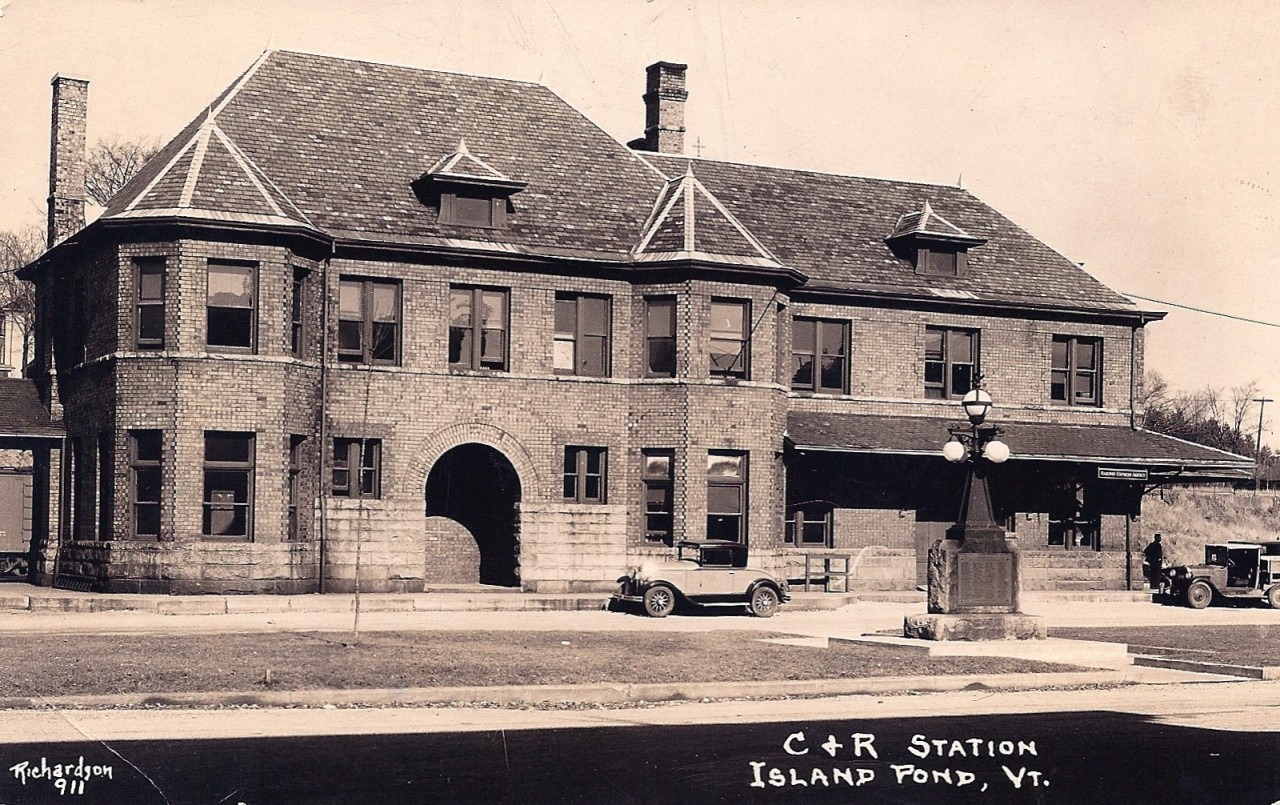
- View of station in 1907

General information
- Location: 23 East Brighton Road; Island Pond, Vermont; United States.
- Coordinates: 44°48′56″N 71°52′50″W

Construction
- Structure type: two floors

Other information
- Status: Commercial and community reuse

History
- Opened: 1853
- Closed: 1965

Former services
Preceding station	Canadian National Railway	Following station
Summit toward Montreal	Montreal – Portland	East Brighton toward Portland
Route map
Location

Island Pond station is a train station located in Island Pond, Vermont. It was opened in 1853 by the Grand Trunk Railway and closed in 1965. The building has been converted to local use.

== History ==
Island Pond became an important railway center in 1853 when the Grand Trunk Railway formed international links between Montreal, Quebec, Canada, and Portland, Maine. The halfway point between Montreal and Portland was Island Pond, Vermont. This city became a thriving railroad center complete with a roundhouse and all the equipment related to the operation of the trains. In 1923, the Grand Trunk Railroad entered bankruptcy and was taken over by the Government of the Canada which operated the railroad through its crown corporation, the Canadian National Railway. Since the Government of the Canada ran the railroad, political considerations soon outweighed the economy of the railroad; and trade was moved from the port of Portland, Maine to the Canadian ports of Halifax (Nova Scotia) and Saint John, New Brunswick.

The importance of the Portland line then began to decline and this would never be reversed. Island Pond began to lose its significance as a major railroad town towards the end of the 1950s due to the elimination of steam locomotives. Around 1960 passenger service to Portland ended, and three years later, diesel locomotive repairs ceased. In 1966 the roundhouse was closed, and the staff working in Island Pond was reduced. The Canadian National continued to operate freight service to Portland until 1988; the following year, the line was sold to the St. Lawrence & Atlantic Railroad, which provides freight service to this day. The station building has been reutilized by a local bank and the town's historical society.

== See also ==
- Grand Trunk railway stations (disambiguation)
