= Gethsemane Evangelical Lutheran Church =

Historic church in Michigan, United States

- U.S. National Register of Historic Places
- Michigan State Historic Site
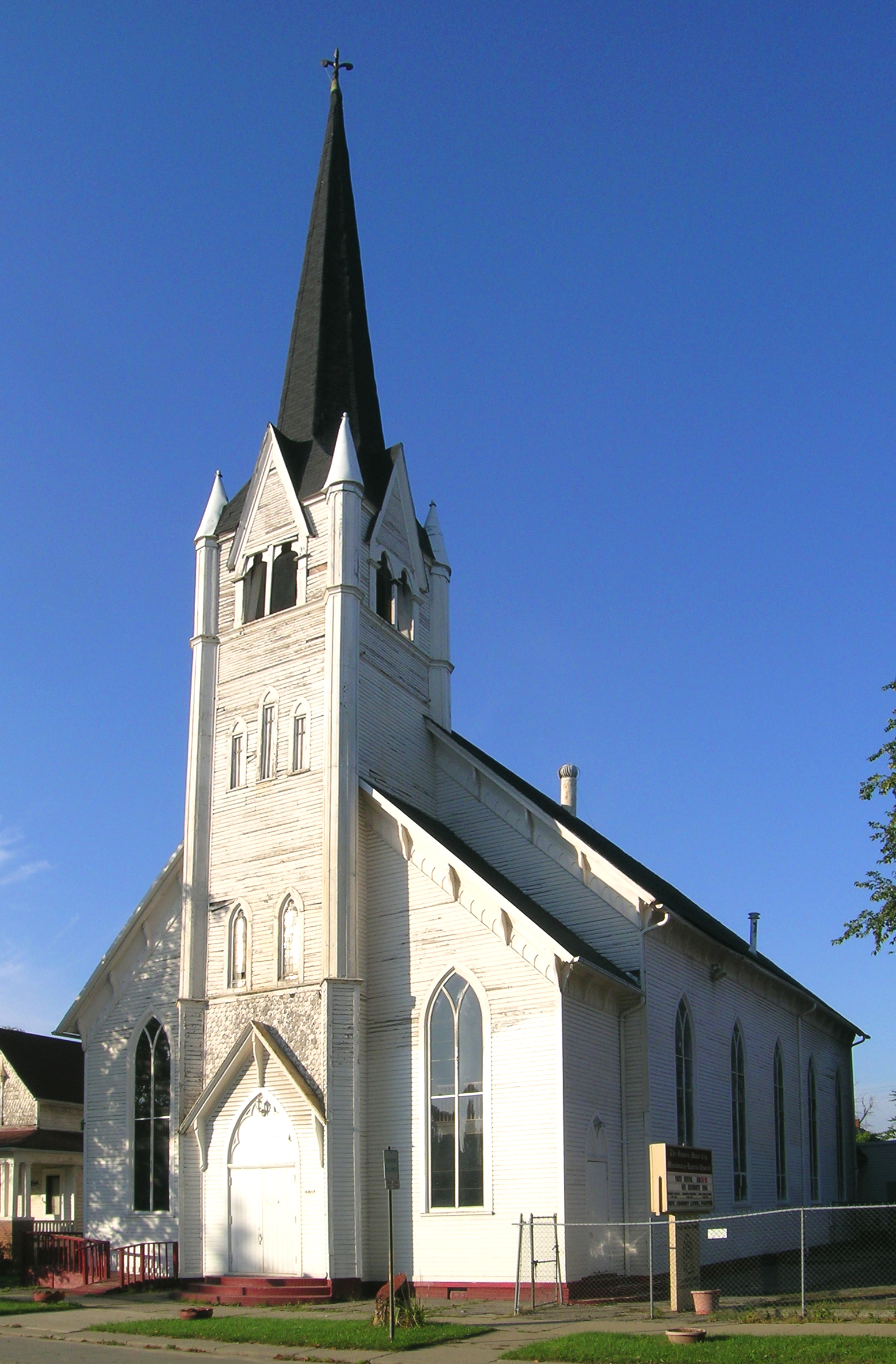
- Interactive map
- Location: 4461 28th St., Detroit, Michigan
- Coordinates: 42°20′16″N 83°6′36″W
- Built: 1891
- Architect: Spier & Rohns
- Architectural style: Carpenter Gothic
- NRHP reference No.: 82002900

Significant dates
- Added to NRHP: April 22, 1982
- Designated MSHS: October 2, 1980

The Gethsemane Evangelical Lutheran Church is a church located at 4461 Twenty-Eighth Street in Detroit, Michigan. It was designated a Michigan State Historic Site in 1980 and listed on the National Register of Historic Places in 1982. The building now houses the Motor City Missionary Baptist Church.

== History ==
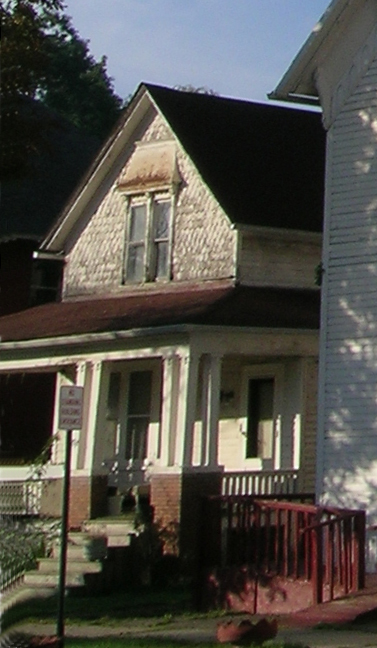
Parsonage adjacent to Gethsemane Evangelical Lutheran Church

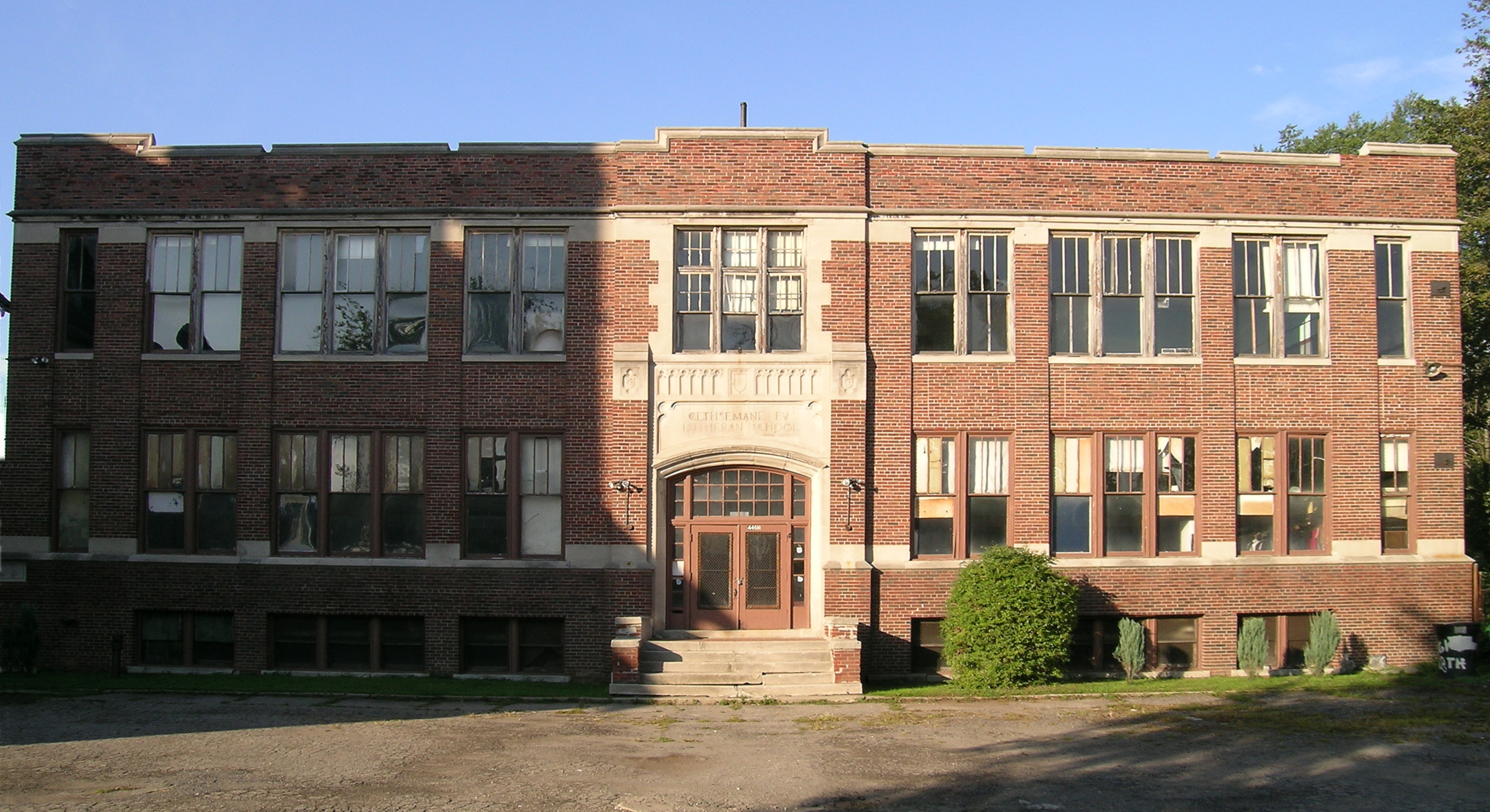
School behind Gethsemane Evangelical Lutheran Church

In the late 1800s, German-speaking immigrants began moving into southwest Detroit. The Zion Evangelical Lutheran Church on Military Street was established in 1882 to service this influx of people. The new congregation quickly swelled, and in 1890, the elders of Zion started a daughter congregation, commissioning the architectural firm of Spier & Rohns to design a wooden structure costing no more than $2000 to build. This building is the only known example of a wooden church designed by the firm.

The church was completed in 1891; a wooden parsonage was added the next year and a brick school was built in 1923. The latter two building are included in the city historical listing, while on the church is on the National and state listing.

The Gethsemane Evangelical Lutheran Church was built in 1891; the congregation used the building until 1976, when they went defunct. The building was purchased by the Motor City Missionary Baptist Church in 1978. The Motor City Baptist Church congregation was organized in 1967 by Rev. John W. Haynes and his wife Inez.

== Description ==
The Gethsemane Evangelical Lutheran Church is a wooden, Carpenter Gothic chapel. It is frame construction with gables at the ends, a central tower, and vestibule in front. The original clapboard siding still clads the building, although white paint has replaced the original cream-and-gold with red-and-blue accent color scheme. Each side has five tall lancet-arched, stained-glass windows, and the eaves are trimmed with hollow curved brackets and a paneled frieze.

The interior is unusually well-preserved. The interior walls feature vertical board wainscoting, with the area above covered in cream painted canvas. The church organ is located on a rear balcony.

The altar from Gethsemane is now used by Christ our Savior Lutheran Church in Livonia, Michigan.
