= Maine Coast Special =

Overview
- Service type: Inter-city rail
- Status: Discontinued
- Locale: Northeastern United States/Quebec
- First service: 1934
- Last service: 1966
- Former operators: Grand Trunk Railway; Boston and Maine Railroad

Route
- Termini: Montreal; Portland
- Distance travelled: 322 miles
- Average journey time: 7:15 in 1966
- Service frequency: weekly-daily during summer
- Train numbers: 16 & 17

On-board services
- Seating arrangements: Coach seating
- Sleeping arrangements: Pullman
- Catering facilities: Buffet parlor car from Montreal to Island Pond

Technical
- Track gauge: 4 ft 8 1/2 in (1,435 mm)

The Maine Coast Special was a summer passenger train operated by the Grand Trunk Railroad between Montreal, Quebec, Portland, Maine and Kennebunk, Maine. It served vacationers to Maine's Atlantic Coast, an important revenue source for the railroad. In addition to a seasonal overnight train, the Grand Trunk ran a daily daytime train that terminated at Portland on India St. instead of Kennebunk.

== History ==
From 1934 to 1939, the Maine Coast Special operated overnight, leaving Montreal after dinner and arriving in Portland and Kennebunk before breakfast. It operated only between Dominion Day and Labor Day. This overnight service was supplemented and later supplanted by a daytime service.

That day train proved popular even after the war, operating occasionally with multiple sections. Year-round service ended on September 5, 1960, and it ran six days per week in the summer of 1961. During the summer of 1963, it ran overnight to Maine on Fridays and during the day to Montreal on Saturdays. For subsequent summers, it ran as a passenger special between July 2 and August 13, running on Saturdays only between Montreal and Portland on India St rather than Portland Union Station.

== Equipment ==
The CNR class U-1 4-8-2 steam locomotives were serviced in Rigby Yard until June 15, 1956 and were replaced primarily by EMD GP9’s. Passengers rode in American Flyer coaches, heavyweight parlor cars and buffet-parlor cars. Its head end coach was often a mail car lettered ‘’Canadian National’’ and ‘’U.S. Mail’’, a homage to the Grand Trunk's status as the first international railroad in North America.
