= Ann Arbor station (Michigan Central Railroad) =

Former railroad station in Ann Arbor, Michigan

Ann Arbor
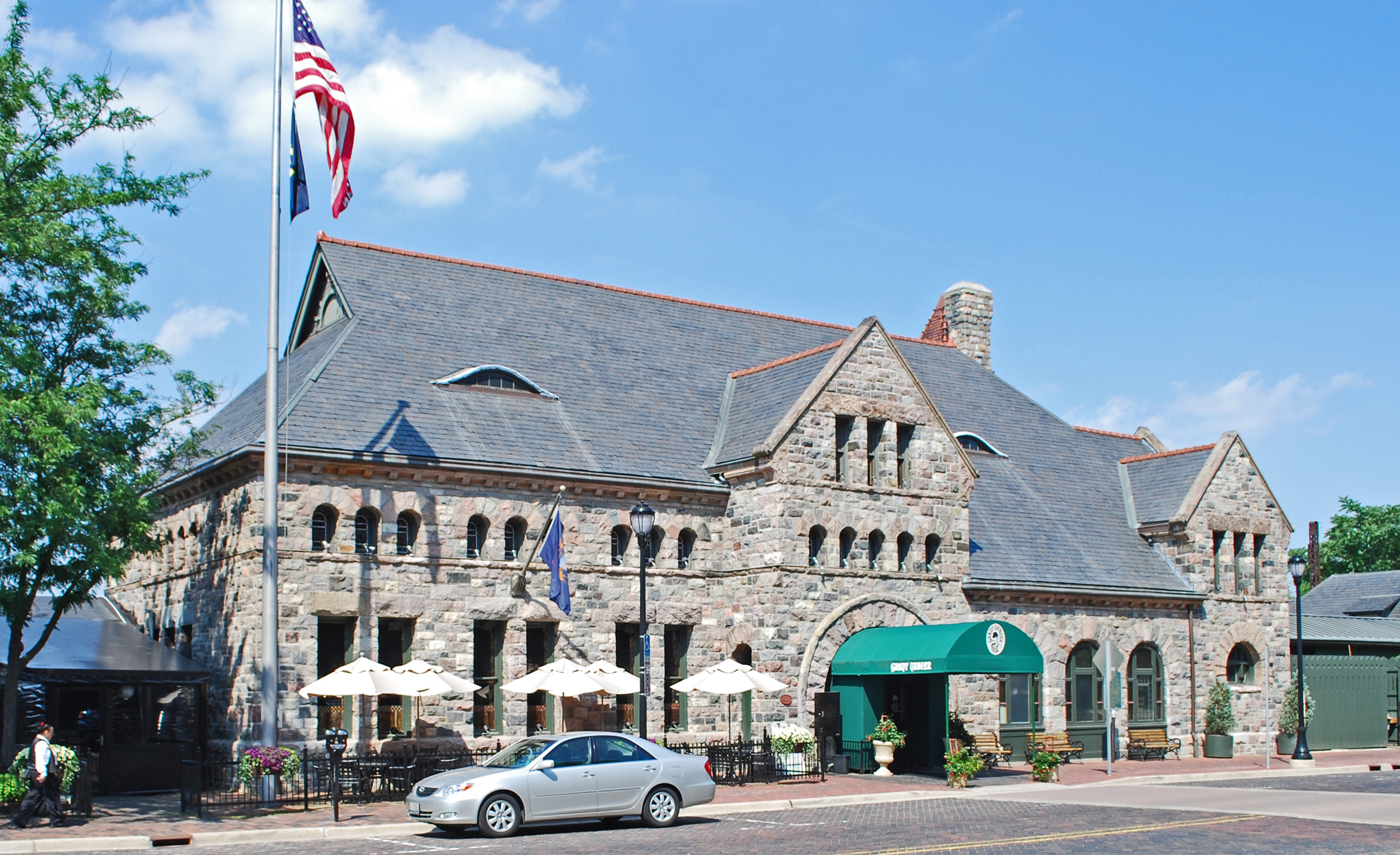

General information
- Location: 401 Depot Street, Ann Arbor, Washtenaw County, Michigan 48104

Former services
Preceding station	New York Central Railroad	Following station
Dexter toward Chicago	Michigan Central Railroad Main Line	Ypsilanti toward Buffalo
- Michigan Central Railroad Depot
- U.S. National Register of Historic Places
- Location: 401 Depot St., Ann Arbor, Michigan
- Coordinates: 42°17′14″N 83°44′32″W
- Area: less than one acre
- Built: 1886
- Built by: Gearing and Sons
- Architect: Spier & Rohns, Frederick Spier
- Architectural style: Richardsonian Romanesque
- NRHP reference No.: 75000963
- Added to NRHP: March 10, 1975
Location

The Ann Arbor station is a former Michigan Central Railroad station located at 401 Depot Street in Ann Arbor, Michigan. It was converted into a restaurant, the Gandy Dancer, in 1970, and listed on the National Register of Historic Places as Michigan Central Railroad Depot in 1975.

== History ==
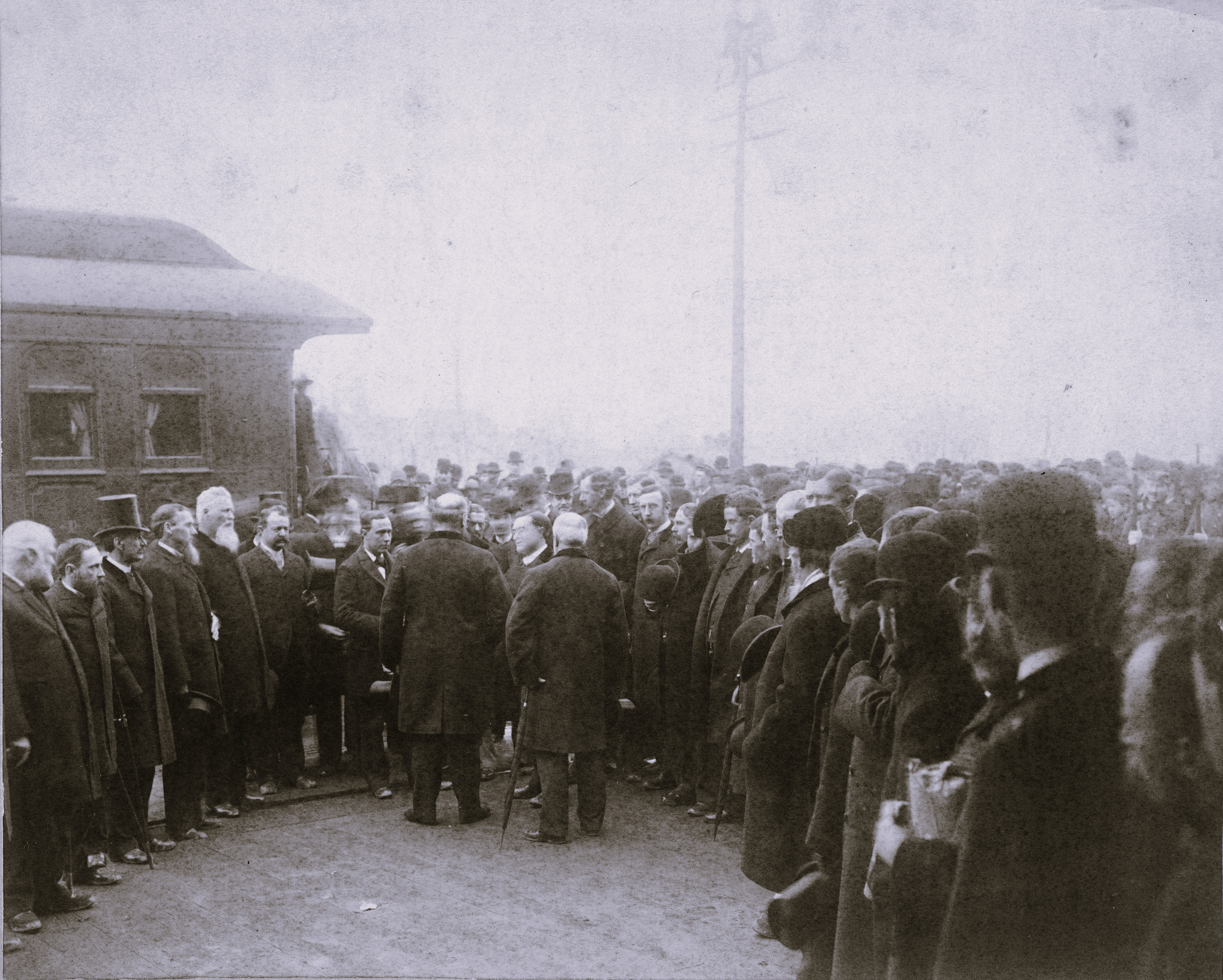
President Grover Cleveland at the Ann Arbor station in 1892, with a crowd that included Mayor William Doty and University President James B. Angell

The Michigan Central Railroad was constructed through Ann Arbor in 1839, and quickly became the center of travel and shipping for Ann Arbor. The line reached Chicago by 1852.

By the late 1880s, the railroad was replacing depots at a number of stations along its lines. Each depot was of a different design, and for the Ann Arbor station, the railroad selected Frederick Spier of the Detroit firm Spier & Rohns as the architect. The station was built by Gearing and Sons, also of Detroit, and completed in 1886. Two other small buildings, a railway express office and a baggage station, were constructed nearby.

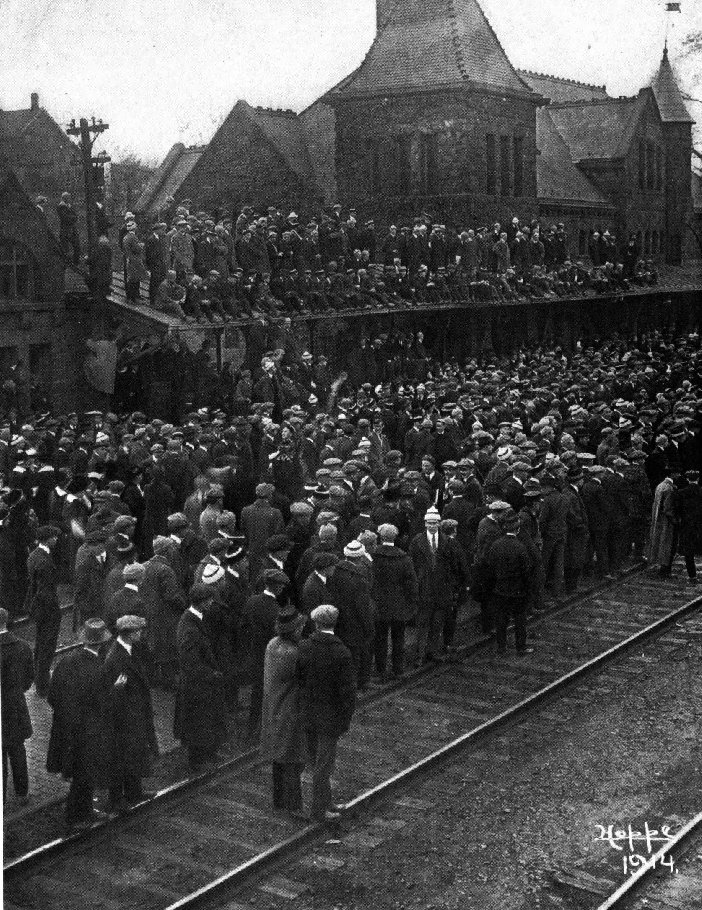
Crowd at Ann Arbor train station sending off 1914 Michigan Wolverines football team for October 31, 1914 game against Harvard

The depot was often used, with 13 Detroit-to-Chicago runs per day in 1915, plus additional shorter local runs. Famous personalities passing through included Teddy Roosevelt, Grover Cleveland, William Howard Taft, William Jennings Bryan, Winston Churchill, and in 1960 John F. Kennedy and Richard Nixon. Noteworthy passenger trains were the Wolverine Chicago-Detroit-New York via Southwest Ontario, the Chicago Mercury and the Twilight Limited (latter two, Chicago-Detroit).

However, the rise of the automobile led to the decline of passenger trains, which accelerated in the 1950s. By the 1960s, passenger service had slowed to a trickle, and in 1970 the railroad sold the station to restaurateur Chuck Muer, who converted the station into a restaurant, the Gandy Dancer. In 1976, the restaurant was expanded, enclosing the space between the main depot and the former baggage station.

== Description ==
The Michigan Central Railroad Depot is a Richardsonian Romanesque structure built solely of rock-faced masonry. The stones were quarried from Four Mile Lake, located between Chelsea and Dexter. The architectural features of the building, such as arches and lintels are emphasized by changes in color and texture in the stone. The building has a high gable roof with two dormers. The eastern portion of the building has large arched windows, and the western portion has double-hung windows with small circular ones above. The main entrance is through a large round-topped arch; the doorway had been modernized.

The interior of the original depot featured an elaborate ticket booth, a ceiling and trim made of red oak, French tile floors, stained glass windows, and a large terra cotta fireplace. The only alteration of the original space is the addition of an interior balcony.

== See also ==
- Ann Arbor station – Current Amtrak station in Ann Arbor
