= Saline First Presbyterian Church =

Historic church in Michigan, United States

- U.S. National Register of Historic Places
- Michigan State Historic Site
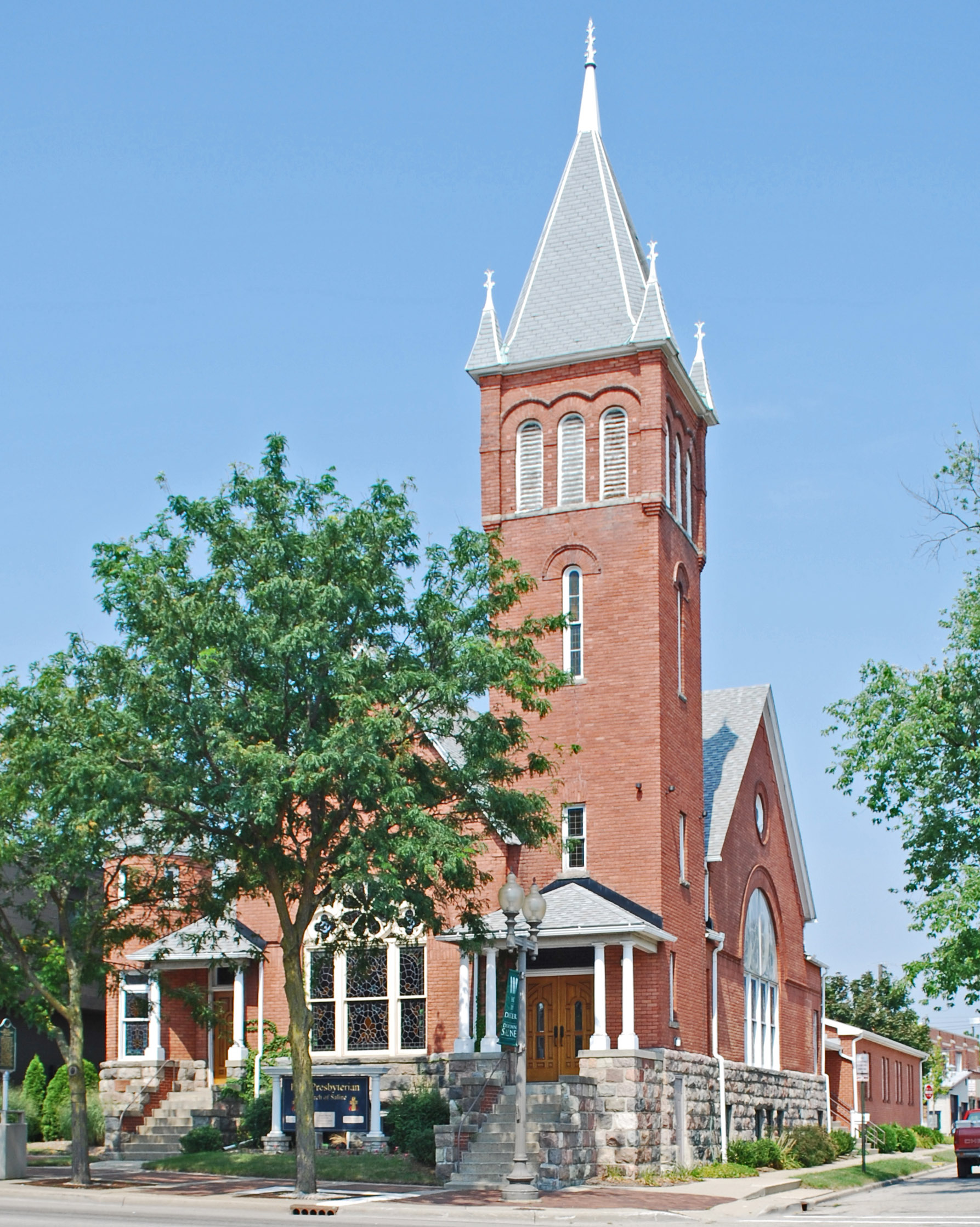

- Location within Michigan Location within the United States
- Interactive map
- Location: 143 E. Michigan Ave., Saline, Michigan
- Coordinates: 42°10′2″N 83°46′50″W
- Area: less than one acre
- Built: 1898
- Built by: Conrad Schaffer & Sons
- Architect: Spier & Rohns
- Architectural style: Romanesque Revival
- MPS: Saline MRA
- NRHP reference No.: 85002960

Significant dates
- Added to NRHP: October 10, 1985
- Designated MSHS: August 30, 1995

Saline First Presbyterian Church is a historic church located at 143 E. Michigan Avenue in Saline, Michigan. It was added to the National Register in 1985 and designated a Michigan State Historic Site in 1995.

== History ==
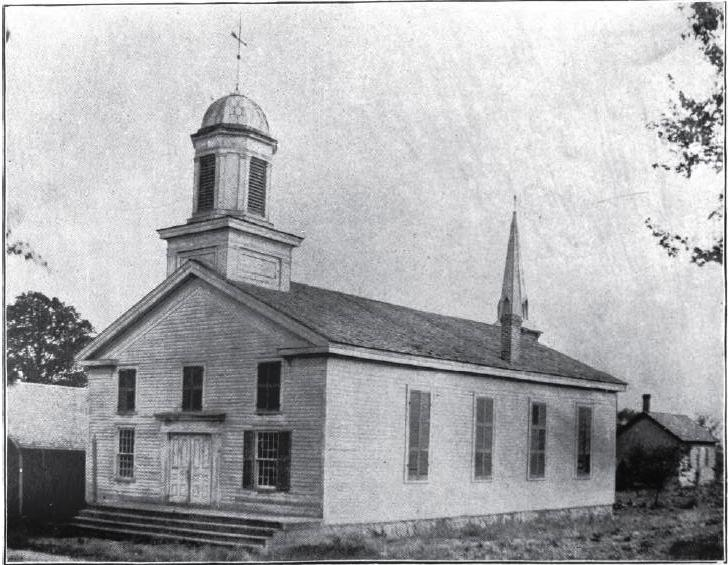
Original frame church, 1842–1898

In 1831, soon after the opening of the Erie Canal, a group of twelve Presbyterian families from Newark, New York pulled up stakes and headed westward to Detroit. The families settled in the area around what is now Saline, and immediately began holding church services. For a decade, these services were held in private homes, schools, or other meeting places; finally, in 1842, the Presbyterian congregation constructed a frame church on the site where the present church is located. This early church served the congregation until 1898, when the current church was constructed. The congregation hired Detroit architects Frederick H. Spier and William C. Rohns to design the church, and local contractor Conrad Schaffer and Son to build it. The structure and interior furnishings cost a total of $5,981.

New porches and steps were constructed in 1954, using stones quarried from the same location as the original stones were. In the mid-1970s, the building was extensively renovated both inside and out. The sanctuary was renovated and restored in 1998, and is still used for services.

== Description ==
The Saline Presbyterian Church is a brick Romanesque Revival structure, built with an irregular plan on a heavy stone foundation. It has a gable roof and a large square corner tower topped with spires; a smaller round tower is located at the southeast corner. The south and east sides of the building feature large stained glass windows.
