= Bethel station (Maine) =

Bethel
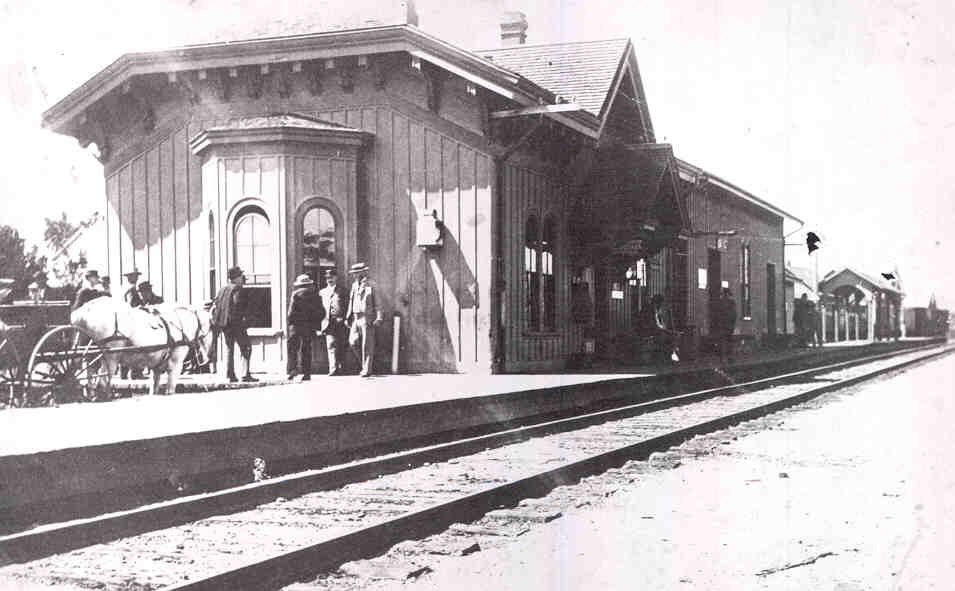

General information
- Location: Bethel, Maine; United States.
- Coordinates: 44°24′38″N 70°47′21″W

History
- Opened: 1865
- Closed: 1968

Former services
Preceding station	Canadian National Railway	Following station
Allens toward Montreal	Montreal – Portland	Locke's Mills toward Portland
Route map
Location

Bethel station was a Grand Trunk railroad station in Bethel, Maine. The passenger service at the station was closed in 1953. In addition to passengers, trains carried mail and Railway Express Agency shipments. Trains 16 and 17 (east and west) passed through Bethel daily stopping at each station on their way between Portland, Maine and Island Pond, Vermont. In September 1960, passenger train service ended on the Grand Trunk between Portland and Island Pond.

== History ==
The St. Lawrence and Atlantic Railroad was chartered in Maine on February 10, 1845. On March 10, 1851, the St. Lawrence and Atlantic engine, Montreal, entered Bethel with the regular morning train from Portland to commence regular service between the two points.

On September 26, 1874, the rails of the St. Lawrence and Atlantic Railroad which had been laid on the broad gage of 5 feet 6 inches were changed on the same day to the standard gage of 4 feet 8 ½ inches from daybreak to 9 am from Montreal to Portland.

During the last decade of the 19th Century, there were three scheduled passenger trains going down and up from Portland and stopping at Locke's Mills, Bethel, West Bethel (Allen), and Gilead. Passenger service was in addition to extensive freight service.
