= Lewiston station =

- Grand Trunk railroad station
- U.S. National Register of Historic Places
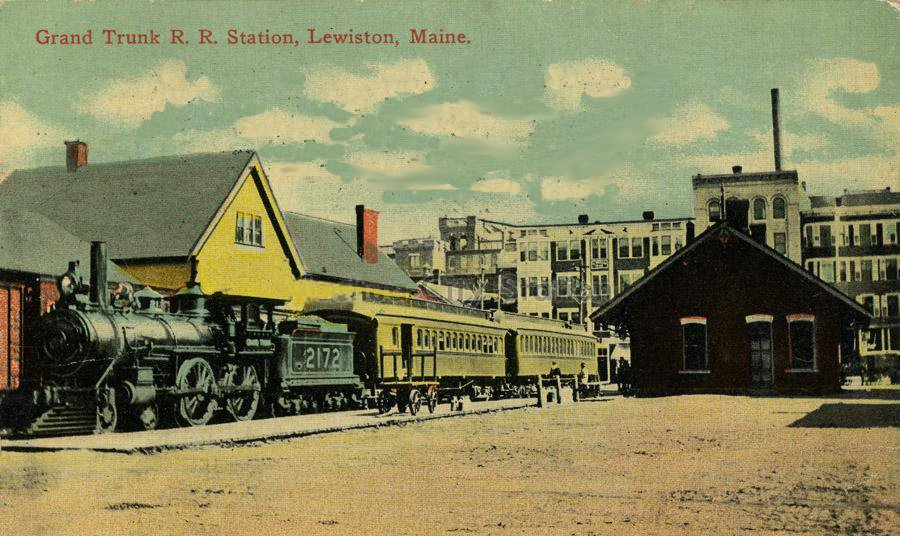
- 1912 postcard showing the station

- Location within Maine Location within the United States
- Location: 103 Lincoln St., Lewiston, Maine
- Coordinates: 44°5′37″N 70°13′12″W
- Built: 1874
- NRHP reference No.: 79000127
- Added to NRHP: June 4, 1979

The Grand Trunk station is a historic railroad station at 103 Lincoln Street in Lewiston, Maine. It was built in 1874 for a spur line connecting Lewiston and Auburn to the Grand Trunk Railway, to which it was leased. It is through this station that many of the area's French Canadian immigrants arrived to work in the area mills. The station was added to the National Register of Historic Places in 1979.

== Description and history ==
Lewiston's Grand Trunk station stands in its mill district, at the northwest corner of Lincoln and Beech Streets. It is a rectangular single-story brick building, with a gabled roof. The roof has extended eaves supported by large brackets, and there are finial turrets near its gable ends. Windows and doorways are set in segmented-arch openings, with granite sills. The end facing Lincoln Street is adorned with remnants of painting identifying the Grand Trunk Railway.

The station was built in 1874 by the Lewiston and Auburn Railroad Company and leased to the Grand Trunk Railway, connecting Lewiston with the Canadian National Railway. Many French-Canadian immigrants arrived in the Lewiston-Auburn area via the station, leading the building to be known as the "Ellis Island" of Lewiston. After rail service to the station stopped, it lay abandoned for decades, and various uses for the building were proposed. In 2010, the Lewiston and Auburn Railroad Company was awarded a Recovery Act grant by the United States Department of Agriculture (USDA) to renovate Grand Trunk Railroad Station. Although the building presently houses a restaurant, proposals are being developed to reintroduce service on the line, connecting Lewiston and Auburn/Lewiston Municipal Airport.

== See also ==
- Grand Trunk railway stations (disambiguation) for other stations affiliated with the Grand Trunk Railway and subsidiaries
- National Register of Historic Places listings in Androscoggin County, Maine

Preceding station	Canadian National Railway	Following station
Auburn toward Danville Junction	Lewiston Branch	Terminus
