= Gorham station =

Gorham
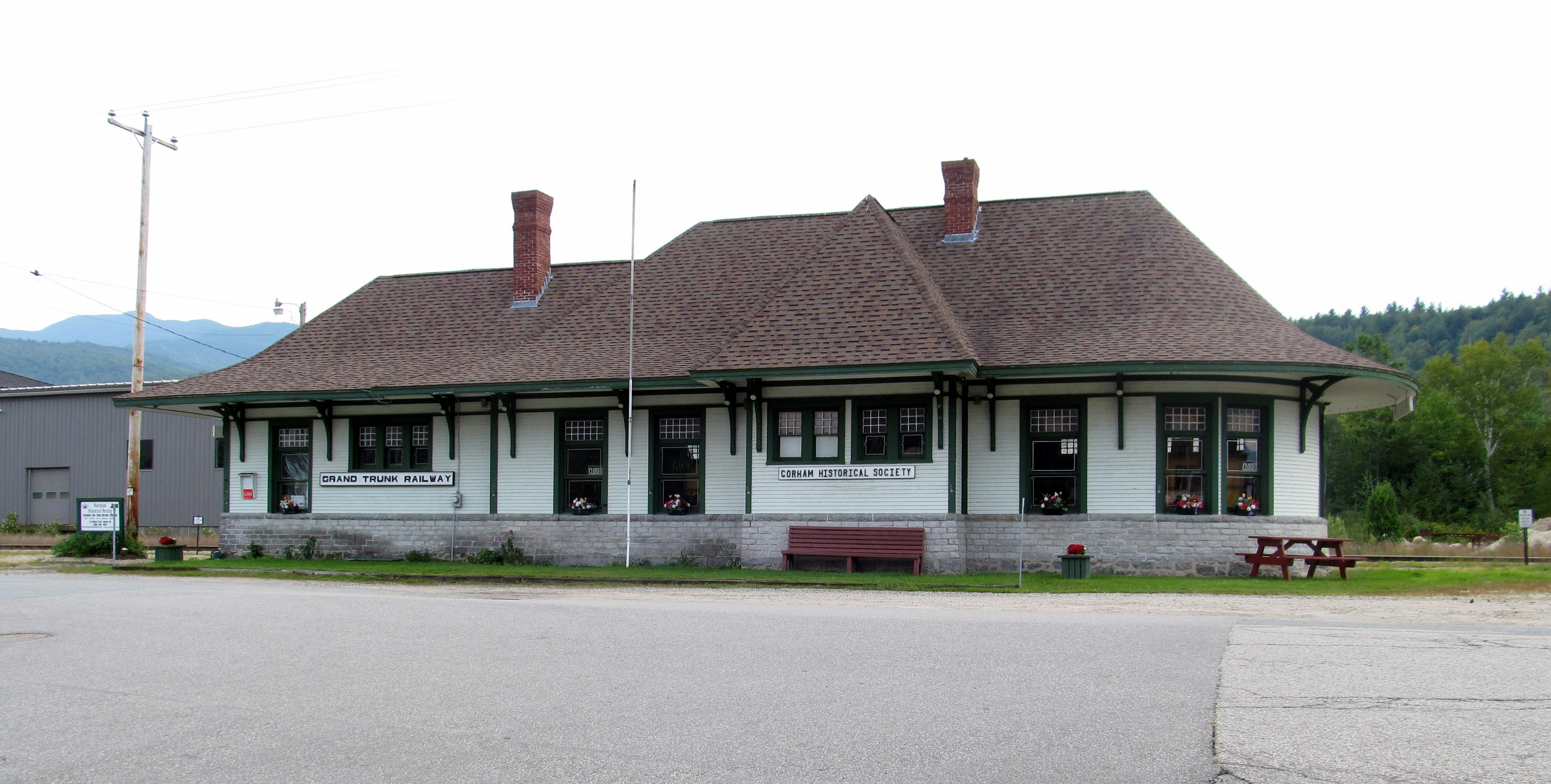
- The former station building in August 2012

General information
- Location: Gorham, New Hampshire; United States
- Coordinates: 44°23′15″N 71°10′33″W

History
- Opened: 1907
- Closed: 1968

Former services
Preceding station	Canadian National Railway	Following station
Berlin toward Montreal	Montreal – Portland	Shelburne toward Portland
Location

Gorham station is a former Grand Trunk Railway station in Gorham, New Hampshire, United States. It was built in 1907, long after the arrival of the railroad in 1851. The existing station was the third depot. The first was in the White Mountain Station House, which was built by the railroad on what is now the Town Common. When it later became the Alpine House, a small depot was built just east of the hotel. Eventually the Alpine House was moved across Main St. to become the Mt. Madison Inn. Thus a new depot was built in 1907, with a 400' platform.

== History ==
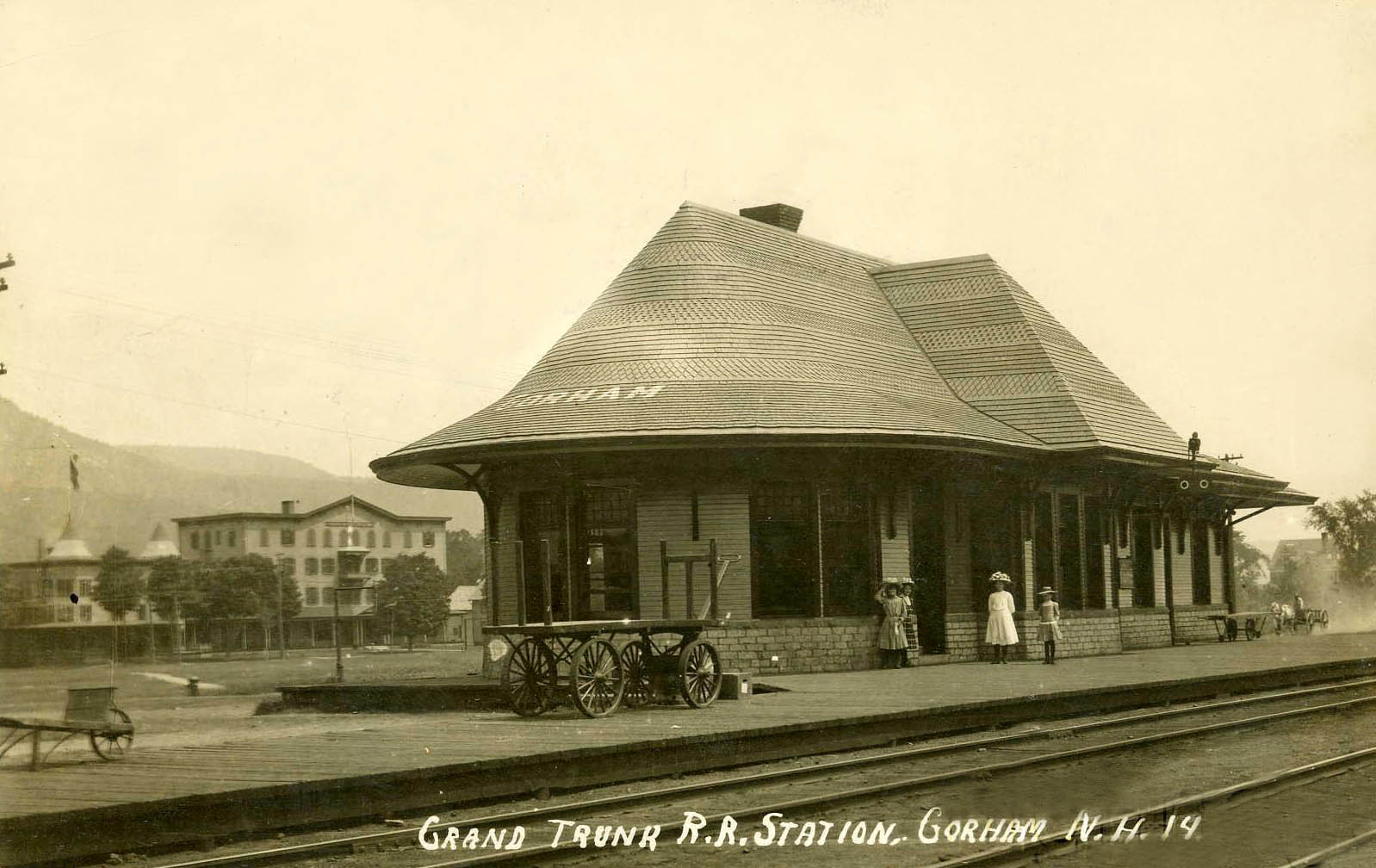
A postcard view of the station around 1900

The St. Lawrence and Atlantic Railroad was chartered in Maine on February 10, 1845. Montreal businessmen obtained a charter for the St. Lawrence & Atlantic Railroad on March 17, 1845. Together, the two companies proposed to construct a railroad between Montreal and Portland across the province of Quebec and the states of Vermont, New Hampshire, and Maine.

Directors of the St. Lawrence and Atlantic Railroad broke ground in Portland on July 4, 1846. It took until July 22, 1851, for construction to allow the first train to enter Gorham, New Hampshire, which represented over 91 miles (146 km) of track. The arrival of the St. Lawrence & Atlantic Railroad in 1851 had a profound and lasting impact upon this part of the Androscoggin Valley. Suddenly, other White Mountain towns that had enjoyed the bulk of the fast-growing tourist trade found their stagecoach connections eclipsed by Gorham and its railroad. Tourists from the East Coast and Canada flocked to the railroad-owned White Mountain Station House (later known as the Alpine House), to the nearby Glen House, the summit of Mount Washington, and other scenic spots.

Construction resumed and reached the town of Northumberland, New Hampshire, on July 12, 1852, passing through the new Berlin station en route. Meanwhile, the St. Lawrence & Atlantic built southeastward from Montreal, and the two companies had agreed on August 4, 1851, to join at the town of Island Pond, Vermont. The first regularly scheduled through train between Montreal and Portland operated on April 4, 1853. Meanwhile, the directors had negotiated the joining of the two railroads between Portland and Montreal into the Grand Trunk Railway Company of Canada, which they accomplished through a 999-year lease dated August 5, 1853, but retroactive to July 1, 1853, roughly three months after completion of the through railway.

The Grand Trunk Railway, which later became known as the Canadian National and, more recently, the St. Lawrence & Atlantic Railroad, opened the area to tourist trade, which is now the principal industry of the community. At first, Gorham, midway between Montreal and Portland, was a major rail yard and repair center, but, gradually the significance of Gorham to the GTR diminished, as did the importance of the railroads to the country.

In 1973, the existing railroad station (built in 1907) was saved from destruction by the Gorham Historical Society. The architecturally unique building, contains displays on area and railroad history. The GHS continually works to expand museum exhibits about the railroads, tourism, the forest products industry and its residents.
