= Spier & Rohns =

Architectural firm, Detroit

Spier, Rohns & Gehrke was a noted Detroit, Michigan architectural firm operated by Frederick H. Spier and William C. Rohns, best remembered for designs of churches and railroad stations. These were frequently executed in the Richardson Romanesque style. F.H. Spier, W.C. Rohns and Hans Gehrke were authors of the Detroit Chamber of Commerce, tallest building in the city at the time of construction (1895). Hans Gehrke's well known structures include the Fire Department Headquarters on Larned Street in Detroit (currently Hotel "Foundation"), and residence of Robert C. Traub in Arden Park residential district of Detroit.

== Notable commissions ==
- Michigan Central Railroad Depot (since 1969 the Gandy Dancer Restaurant and Roadhouse Saloon), 401 Depot Street, Ann Arbor, Michigan, 1886
- Michigan Central Railroad Depot, 210 East Michigan Avenue, Grass Lake, Michigan, 1887
- Kelsey Museum of Archaeology of the University of Michigan, built as the Newberry-Hall-Student Christian Association building, Ann Arbor, Michigan, 1888
- Michigan Central Railroad depot, (as of 2009 the Niles Amtrak Station), 598 Dey Street, Niles, Michigan, 1890
- Gethsemane Evangelical Lutheran Church, Detroit, 1891
- Sweetest Heart of Mary Roman Catholic Church, Detroit, 1892
- University of Michigan - Tappan Hall, Ann Arbor, Michigan, 1893
- Detroit Chamber of Commerce Building, (currently named United Way Community Services Building, Detroit, 1895 (the tallest building in Detroit at the time of its construction)
- St. Thomas the Apostle Catholic Church, Ann Arbor, Michigan, 1897
- Saline First Presbyterian Church, 143 E. Michigan Ave., Saline, Michigan, 1898
- Union Depot (Lansing, Michigan), 637 East Michigan Avenue, Lansing, Michigan, 1902 (Since 1978 - Clara's Restaurant)
- Grand Trunk Western Station, 1203 South Washington Avenue, Lansing, Michigan, 1902
- Durand Union Station, 200 Railroad Street, Durand, Michigan, 1903
- Grand Trunk Railway Station, India Street at Fore Street, Portland, Maine, 1903 (razed 1966)
- West Medical - University of Michigan (now the Dana Building), Ann Arbor, Michigan, 1903
- Grand Trunk Railway Allandale station, 285 Bradford Street, Barrie, Ontario, L4N, Canada, 1904
- Grand Trunk Railway depot, 175 Main Street, Battle Creek, Michigan, 1906
- Detroit and Mackinac Railway station, 10th Street and Fair Avenue, Alpena, Michigan, 1911
- Belle Isle Skating Pavilion - Belle Isle Park (Michigan), Detroit, Michigan, 1893 (Demolished 1950)
- St. Mary Star of the Sea Catholic Church (Jackson, Michigan)
- Waldo Stadium of Western Michigan University, built as the first campus sporting venue, Kalamazoo, Michigan

== Gallery ==
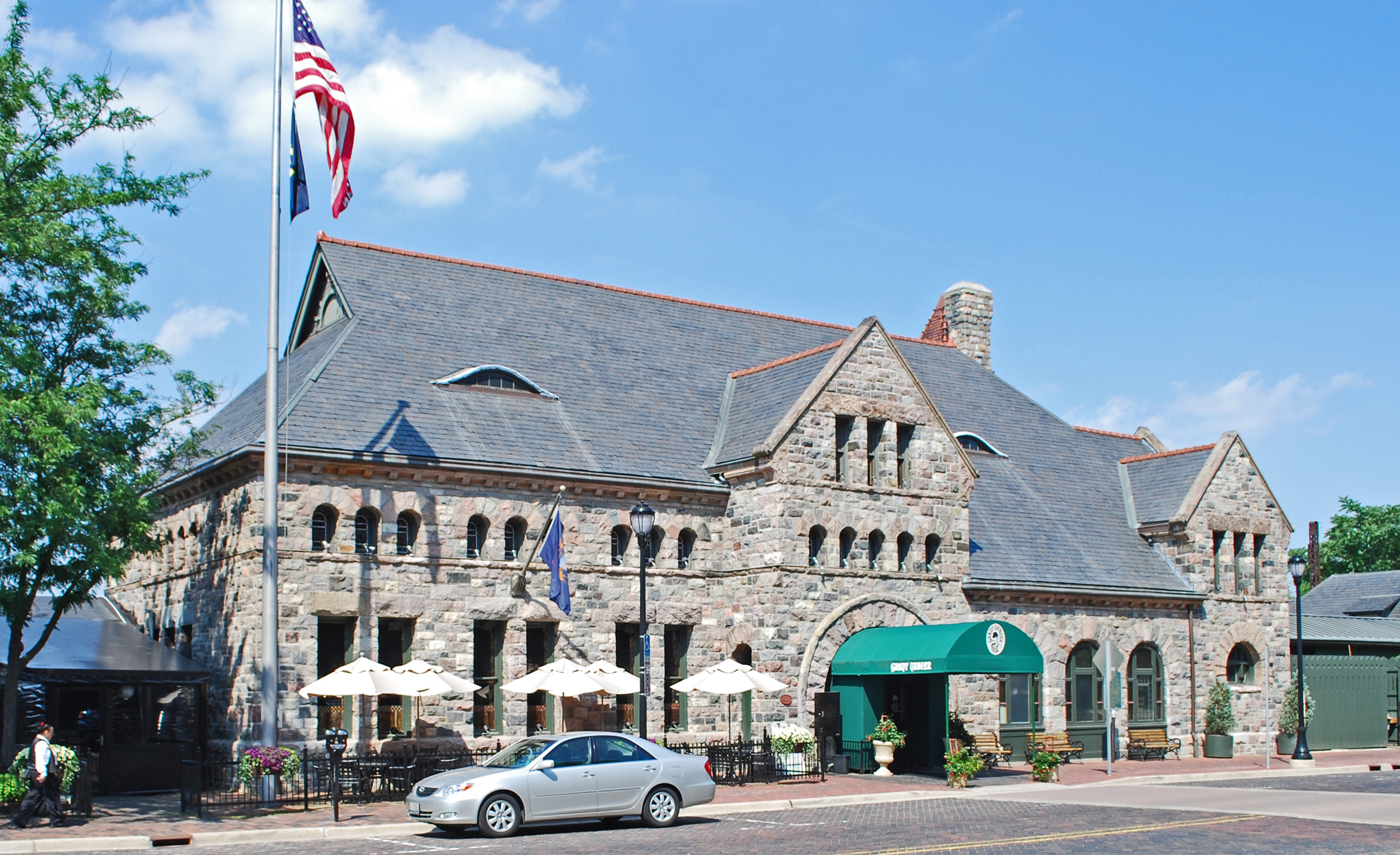
Michigan Central Depot, Ann Arbor, Michigan

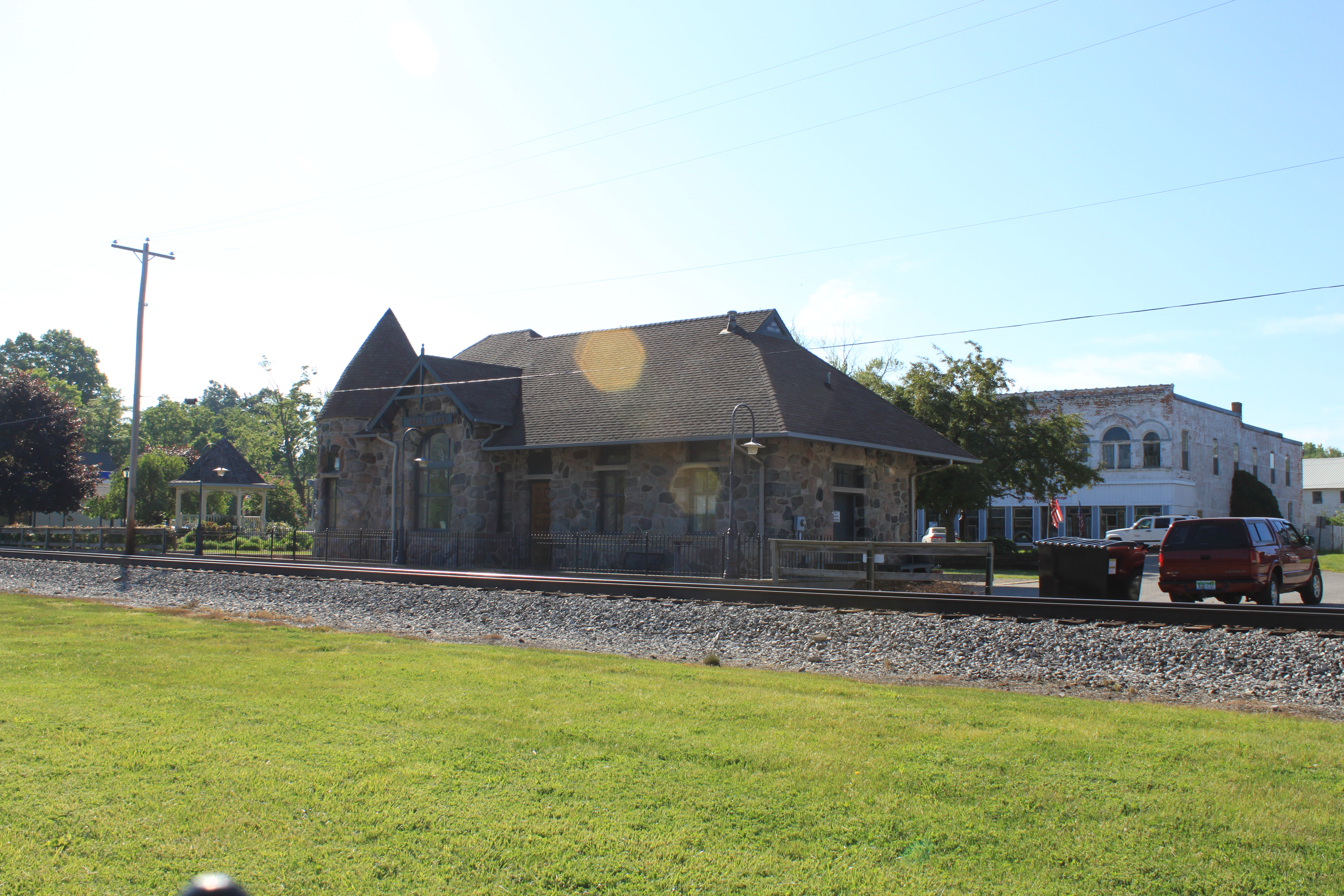
Michigan Central Depot, Grass Lake, Michigan

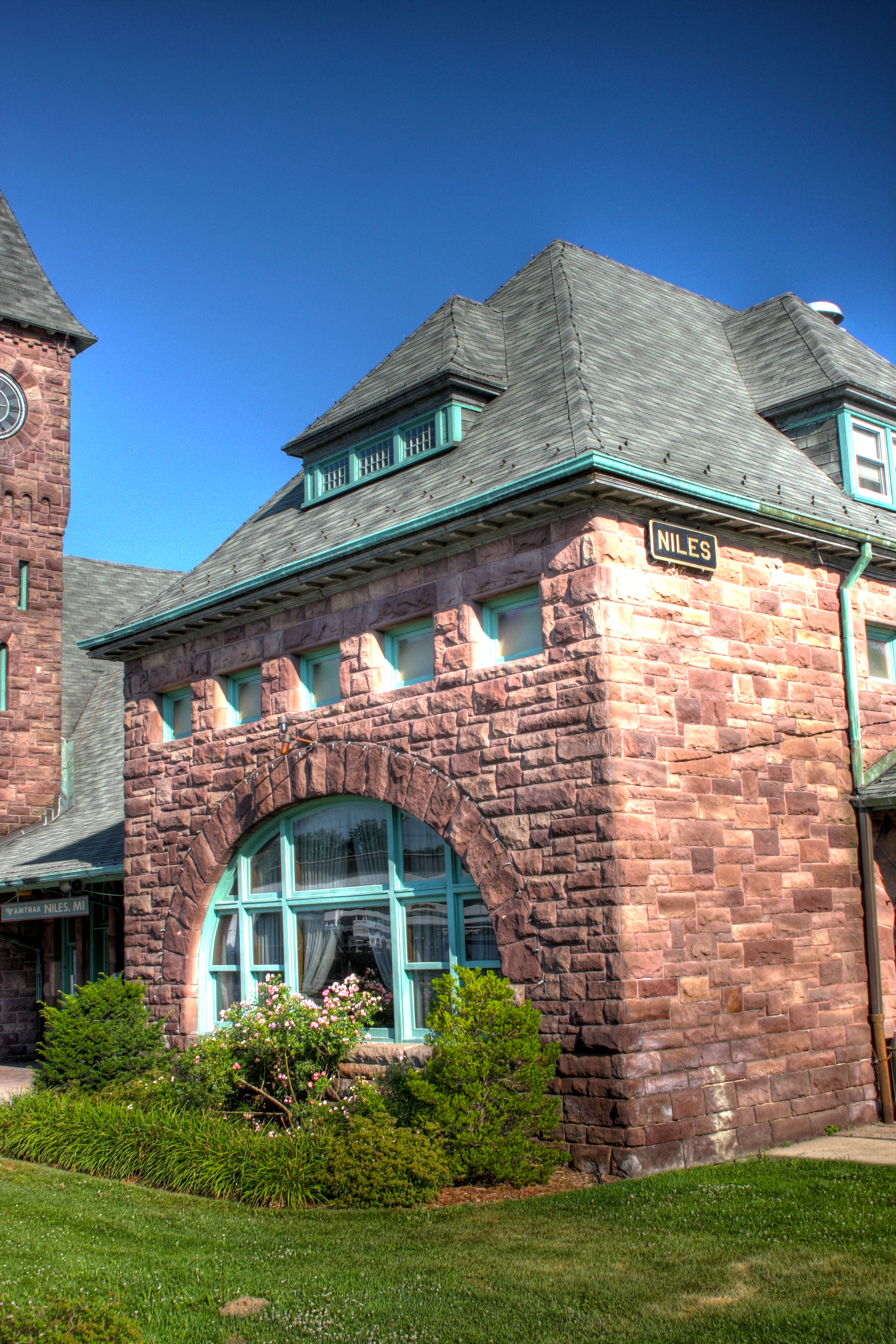
Michigan Central Depot, Niles, Michigan

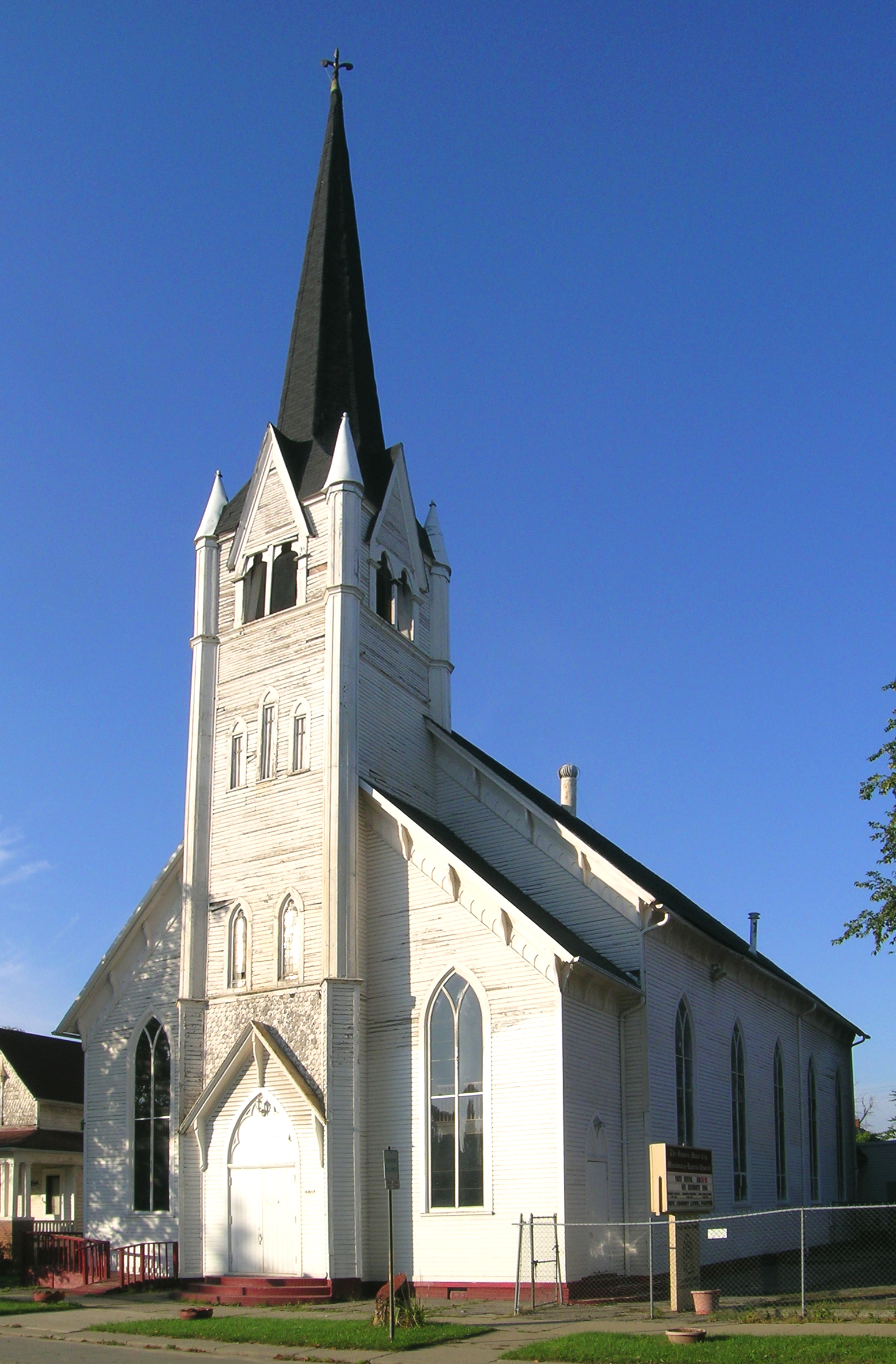
Gethsemane Evangelical Lutheran Church, Detroit, Michigan

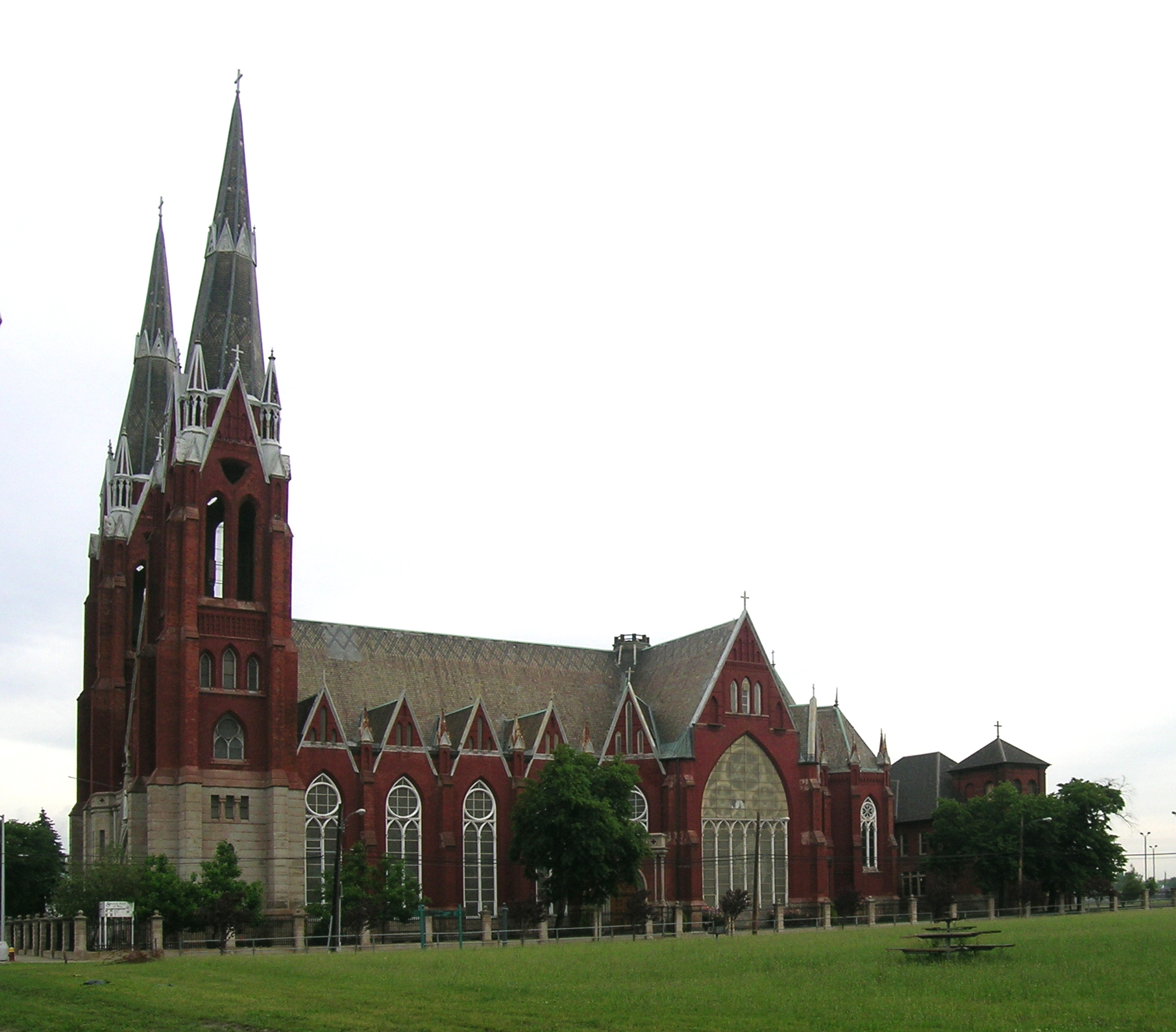
Sweetest Heart of Mary Church, Detroit, Michigan

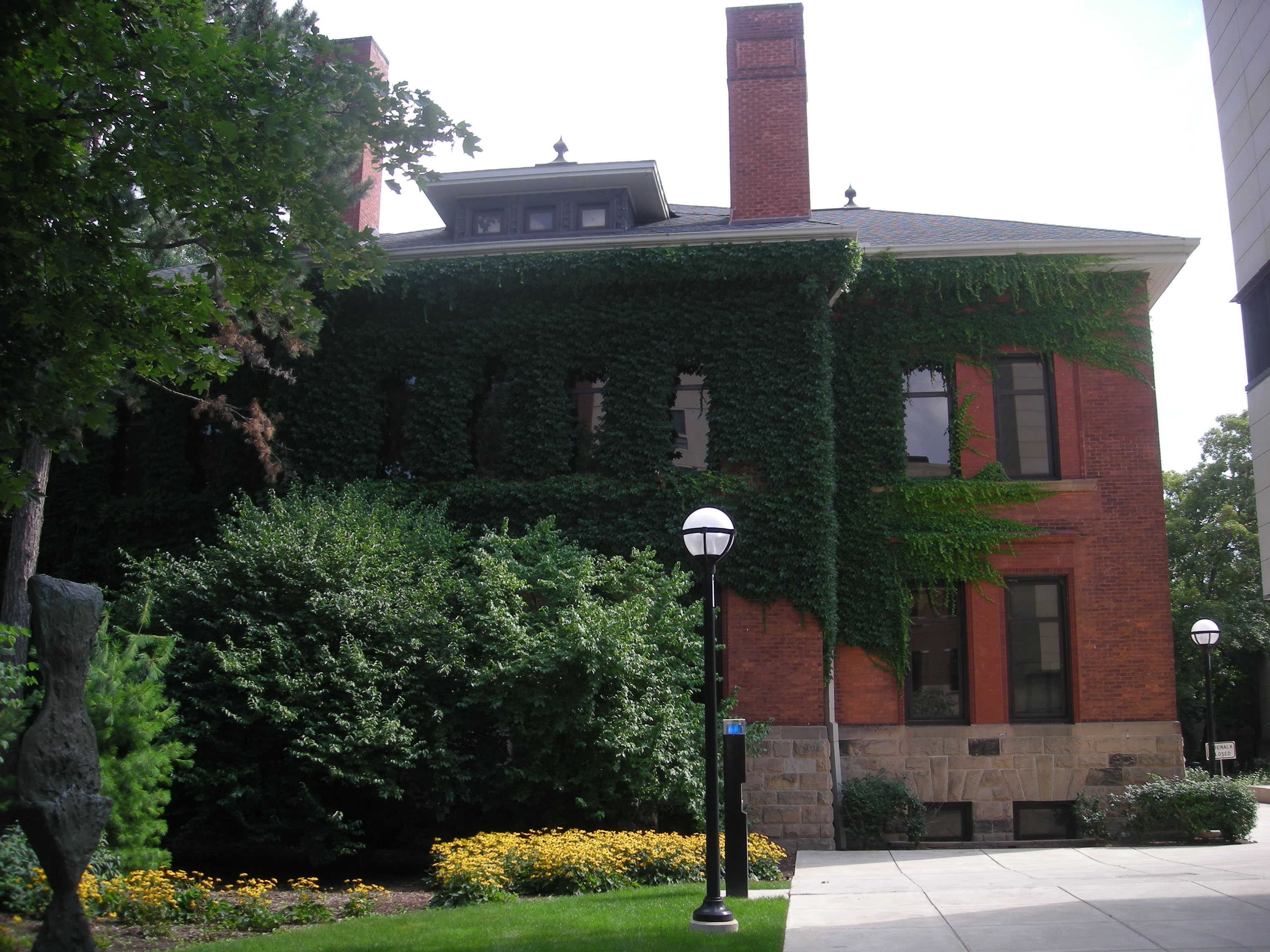
Tappan Hall, University of Michigan, Ann Arbor, Michigan

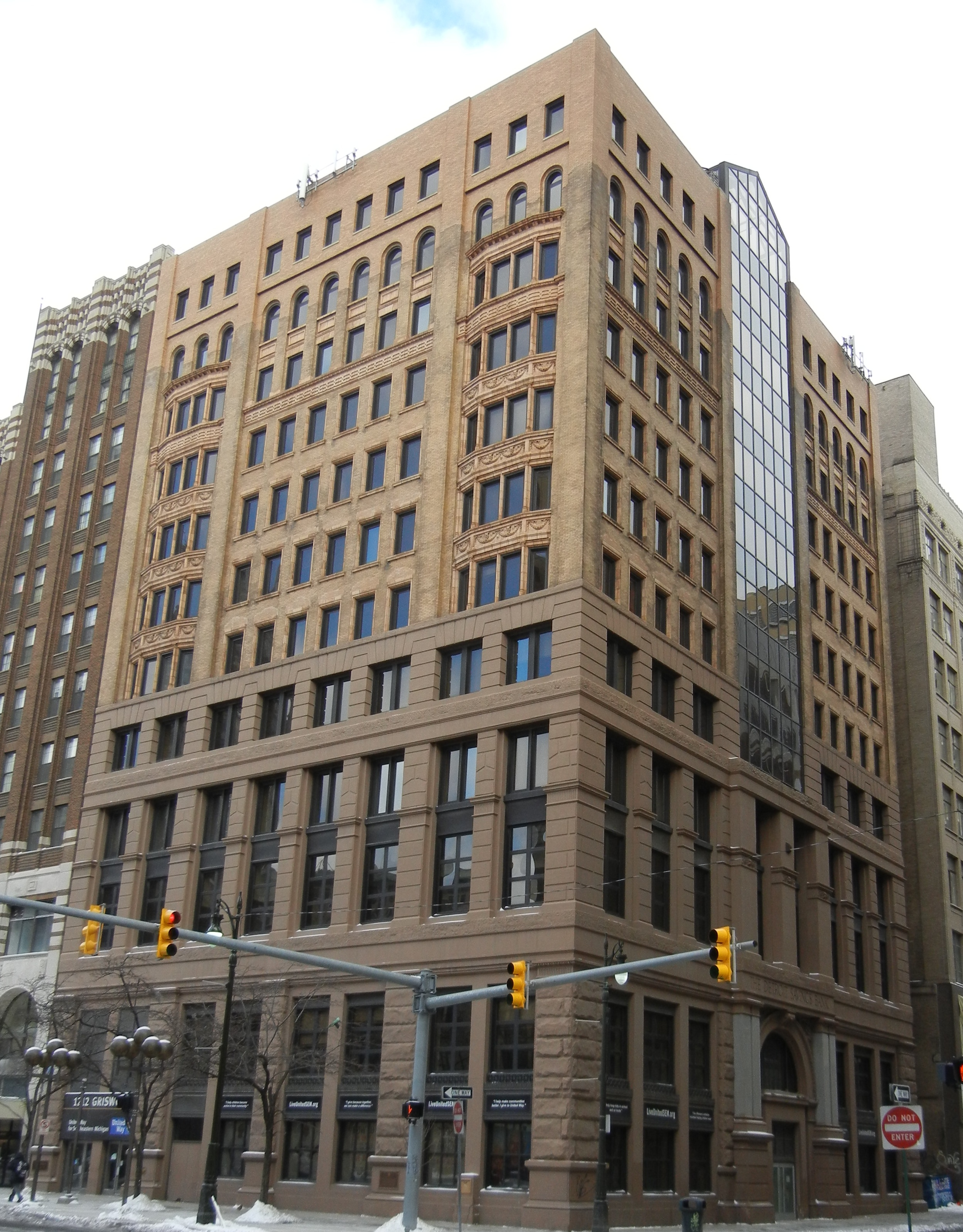
United Way Community Services Building, Detroit, Michigan

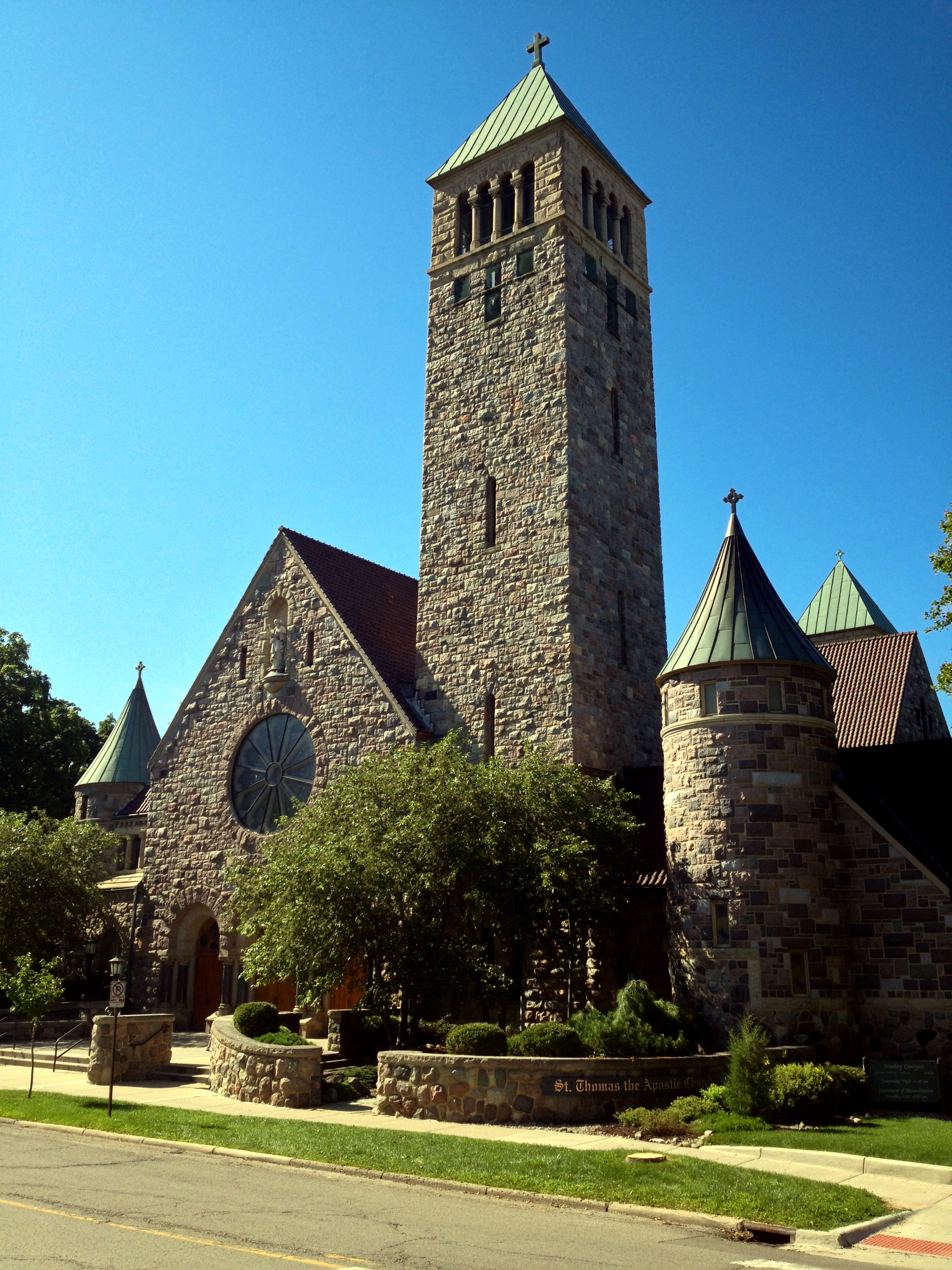
St. Thomas Church, Ann Arbor, Michigan

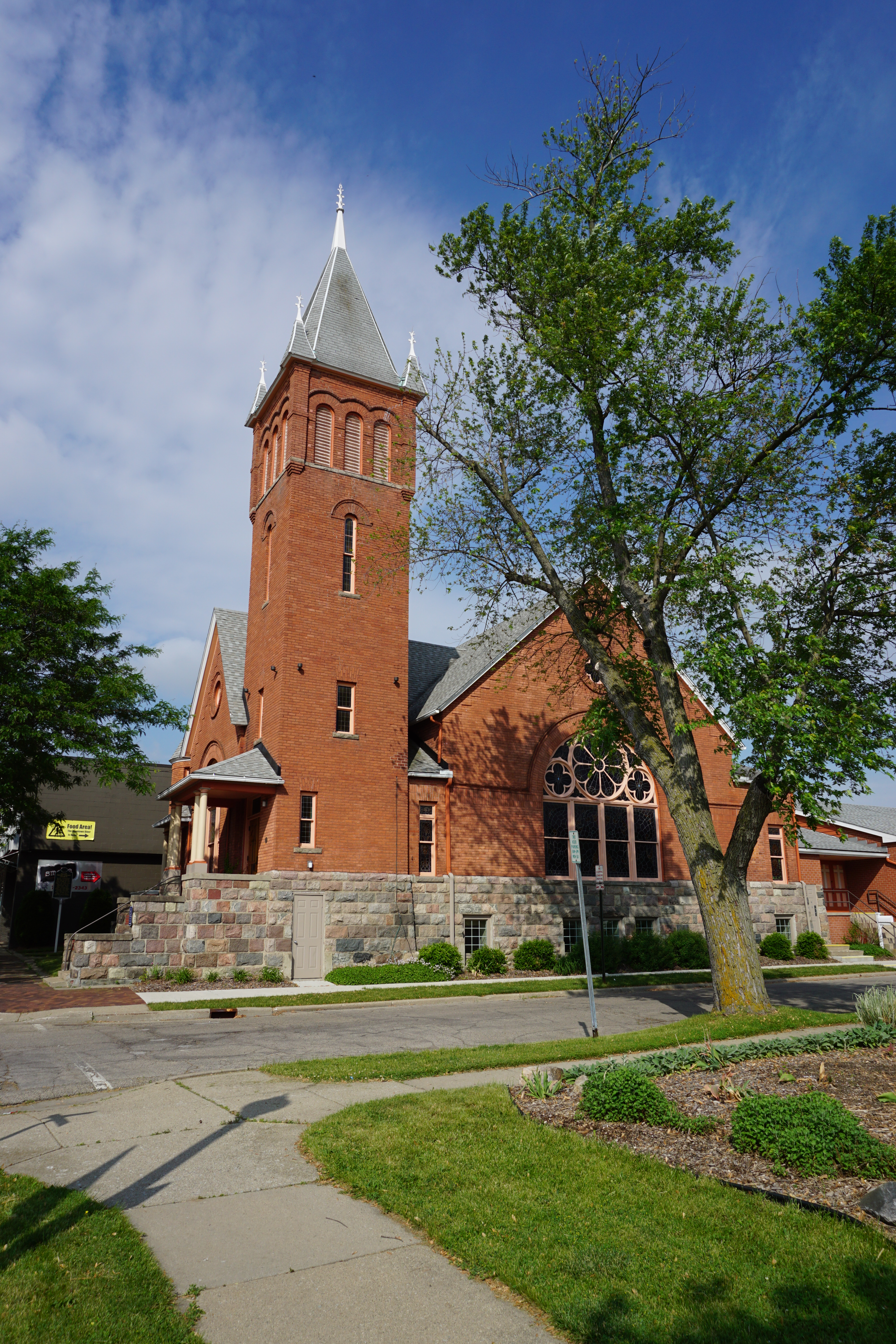
First Presbyterian Church, Saline, Michigan

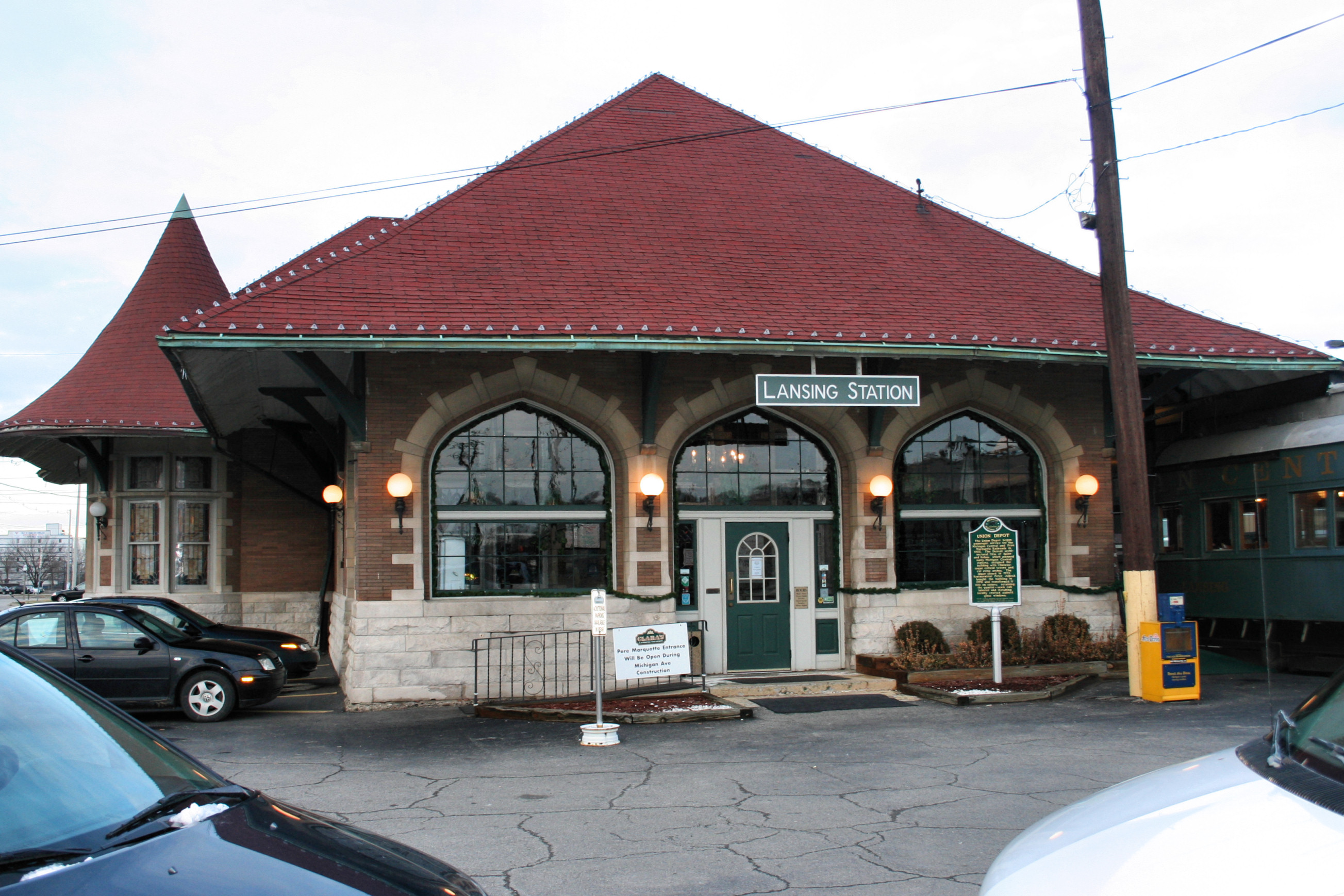
Union Depot, Lansing, Michigan

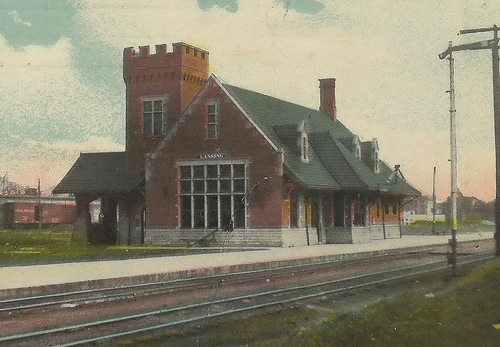
Grand Trunk Station, Lansing, Michigan

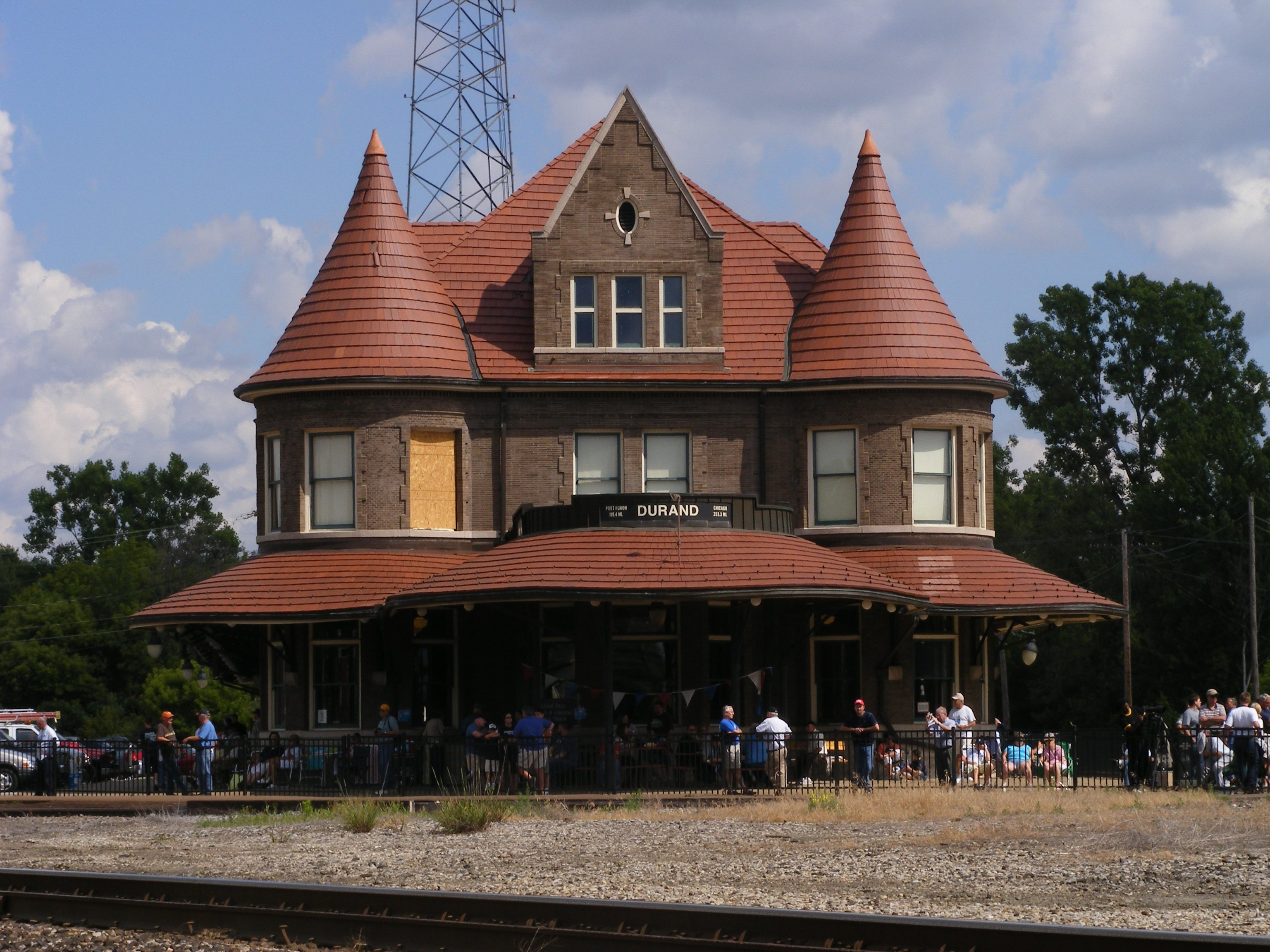
Union Station, Durand, Michigan

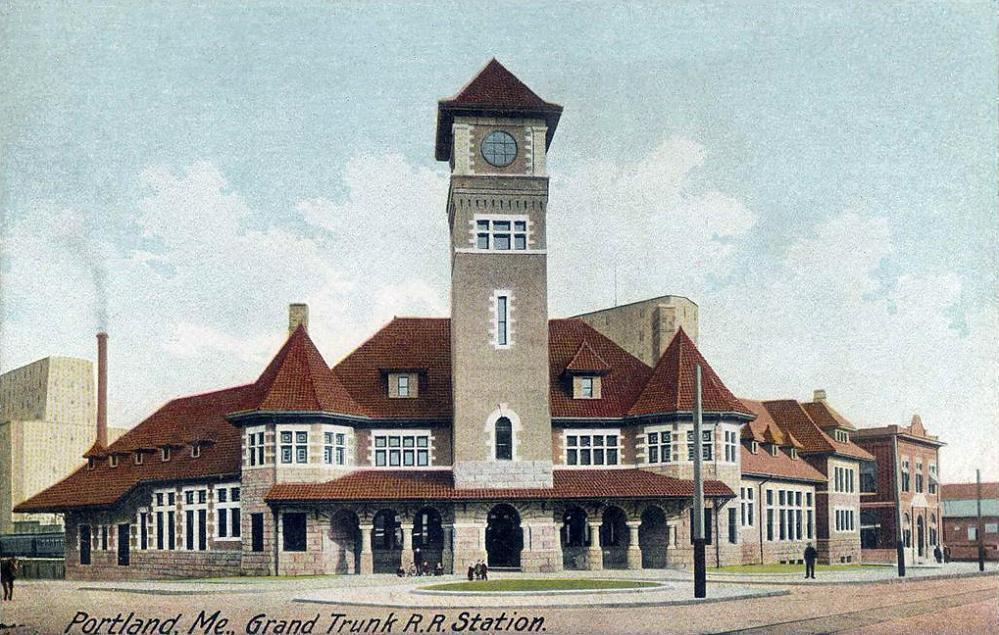
Grand Trunk Station, Portland, Maine

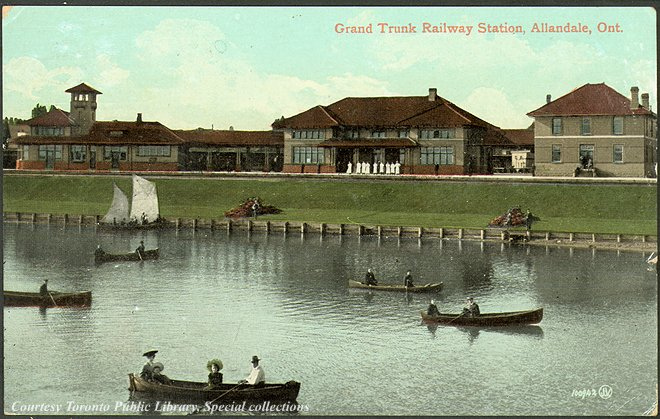
Grand Trunk Station, Allandale, Ontario

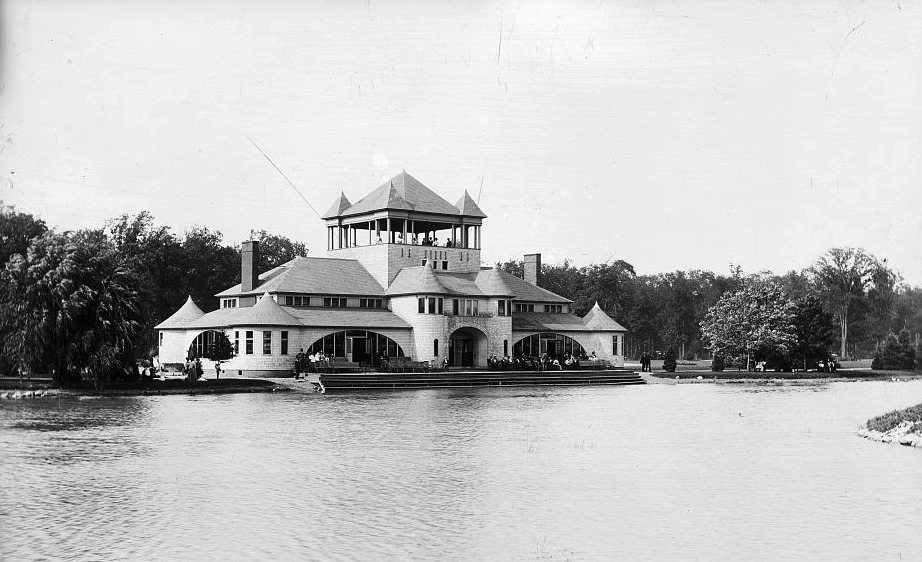
Belle Isle Skating Pavilion, Detroit, Michigan

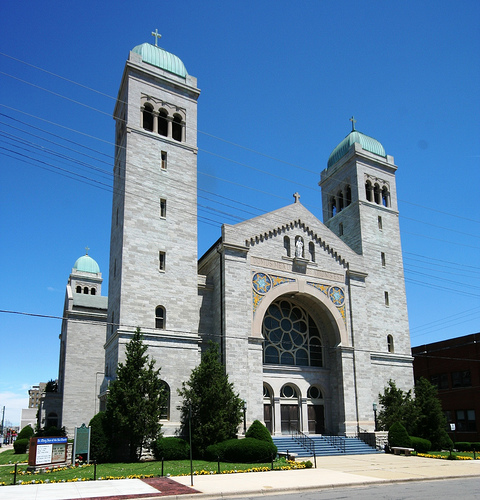
St. Mary Star of the Sea Church, Jackson, Michigan
