= Oxford station (Maine) =

Former railway station in the US state of Maine

Coordinates: 44.1445°N 70.4629°W

Oxford
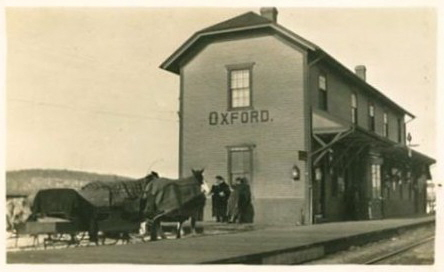
- View of station in 1890

General information
- Location: Oxford, Maine; United States

Other information
- Status: demolished

History
- Opened: 1883
- Closed: 1965
- Former names: Grand Trunk Railroad

Former services
Preceding station	Canadian National Railway	Following station
South Paris toward Montreal	Montreal – Portland	Mechanic Falls toward Portland
Route map
Location

Oxford station was a historic railroad station in Oxford, Maine. The station was built in 1883 by the Grand Trunk Railroad linking Oxford with Montreal and Portland, Maine. The village grew especially after the arrival of the St. Lawrence & Atlantic Railroad toward the end of 1840. The railroad opened the village to several business ventures between Portland and Montreal. The railroad passes through the midst of the town, in the same general line with the river, and has a station (Oxford Depot) a short distance south of the centre.

After the cessation of rail services at the station in 1965, it was demolished in 1968.
