= Richmond station (Quebec) =

Railway station in Quebec, Canada

Richmond
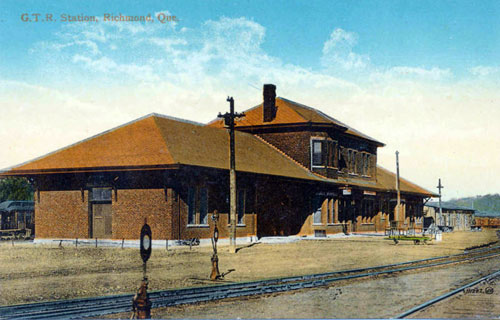
- Postcard view of the GTR station in 1915

General information
- Location: 739, Rue Principale Nord; Richmond, Quebec; Canada.
- Coordinates: 45°39′54″N 72°08′54″W
- Owner: private

Construction
- Structure type: brick station building

History
- Opened: 1853; 1985
- Closed: 1981; 1994
- Rebuilt: 1999 restaurant

Former services
Preceding station	Via Rail	Following station
Acton Vale toward Montreal	Atlantic	Sherbrooke toward Halifax
Preceding station	Canadian National Railway	Following station
Gore toward Montreal	Montreal – Portland	Morse toward Portland
Terminus	Richmond – Quebec; Local stops	St. Cyr toward Quebec

Heritage Railway Station (Canada)
- Official name: Canadian National Railway Station, Richmond, Quebec
- Designated: 1991
- Reference no.: 6719
Route map
Location

Richmond station is a historic building located on rue Principale Nord in Richmond in the province of Quebec. The current building was constructed in 1912 by the Grand Trunk Railway (GTR) to replace the previous wood-frame structure which had been destroyed by fire.

The brick building has granite lintels that give it a more refined look than the earlier stations. The two storey central block has two symmetrical single storeys on either end, which have had dormer windows added more recently.

== History ==
The St. Lawrence and Atlantic Railroad acquired land in 1848 for their right-of-way through Melbourne Township, which would open up the town of Richmond to business between Portland and Montreal. At the same time the Quebec and Richmond Railway was constructing a line connecting to Quebec City, making Richmond an important railway centre.

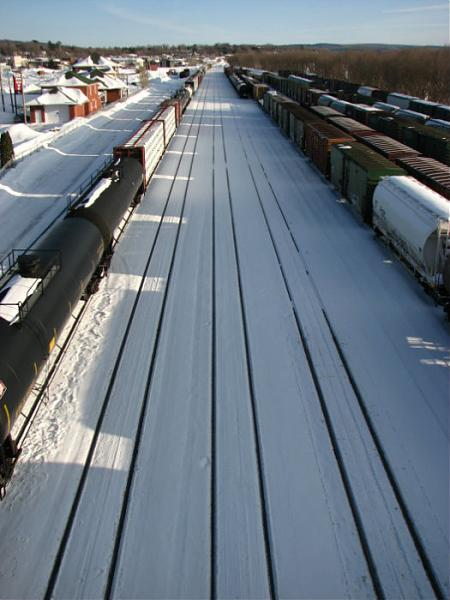
The St. Lawrence and Atlantic Railroad yard.

Those two railway companies became part of the newly formed Grand Trunk Railway in 1853, with the Richmond station located between the tracks at the junction of the lines.

The Grand Trunk Railway was absorbed by Canadian National Railway (CNR) in 1923, who continued to operate the Portland-Sherbrooke line as its Berlin Subdivision. Richmond remained an important repair and maintenance yard until the 1950s. Passenger service was continued by Via Rail until 1994.

Following Canadian deregulation in 1989, short line operator Genesee & Wyoming formed subsidiary St-Laurent & Atlantique Railroad (Quebec) (SLQ) to operate the portion of the St. Lawrence and Atlantic Railroad line from the US border at Norton through to Sainte-Rosalie, where it connects with the CNR main line. This company has facilities beside the station and a rail yard that stretches along the east bank of the Richelieu River.

Richmond station has been designated as a Heritage Railway Station of Canada since September 1991.

The old station building was converted into La Vieille Gare de Richmond restaurant in the summer of 1999.
