= Hamilton station (Grand Trunk Railway) =

Former railway station in Hamilton, Ontario, Canada

Hamilton
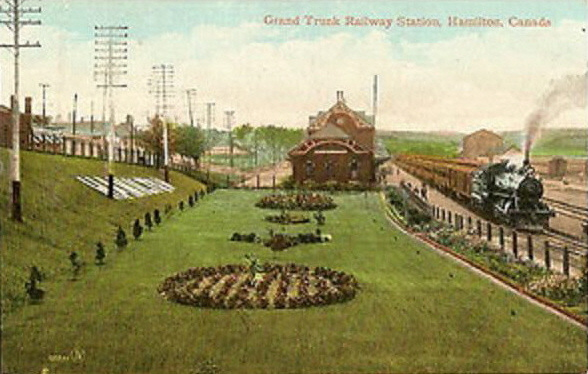
- View of station in 1911

General information
- Location: Stuart St. at Caroline St. North; Hamilton, Ontario; Canada.
- Coordinates: 43°16′05″N 79°52′20″W

Construction
- Structure type: two storeys

Other information
- Status: demolished

History
- Opened: 1856
- Closed: 1931
- Former names: Grand Trunk Railway
Location

The Grand Trunk station was a historic railroad station in Hamilton, Ontario, which was located on Stuart Street, at the beginning of Caroline Street North.

In 1885, an effort was made to beautify the area to the east of the station itself with ornamental gardens. The embankment along Stuart Street provided an opportunity to let passengers passing by to know exactly what city they were in, with the word "Hamilton" written with white stones.

Michael Willson Browne, one of the pioneers of the shipping industry in Hamilton, moved to Hamilton in 1836, and entered into a partnership with Daniel Charles Gunn, who retired in 1847. Mr. Browne became manager of the Grand Trunk Railway's office in Hamilton in 1864.

== See also ==
- Hamilton CNR Station
- James Street North GO Station
