= Portland station (Grand Trunk) =

Passenger rail station in Maine, United States

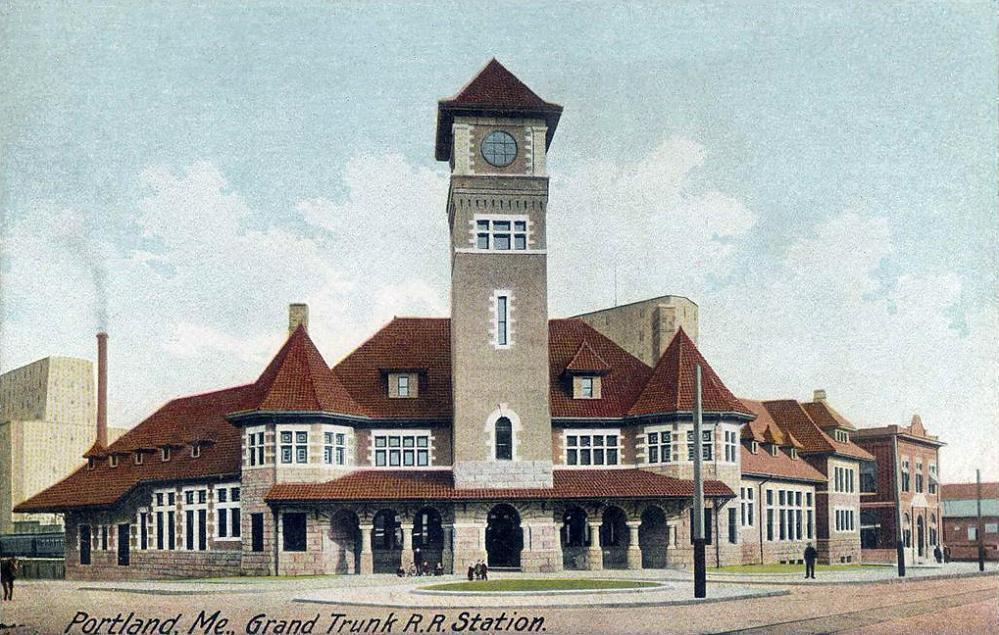
- Viewed in 1906 from the intersection of Fore Street and India Street

General information
- Other names: Grand Trunk Station
- Location: India Street, Portland, Maine
- Coordinates: 43.65950°N 70.24845°W
- Operator: Portland and Forest Avenue Railroad Company; Grand Trunk Railroad

Construction
- Architect: Spier & Rohns

History
- Opened: 1906

Key dates
- 1966 (60 years ago): demolished

Former services
| Preceding station | Canadian National Railway | Following station |
|---|---|---|
| Deering toward Montreal | Montreal – Portland | Terminus |
Location

Portland station was a passenger rail station on the Grand Trunk Railway in Portland, Maine, United States. It stood to at the foot of India Street, Portland's first street, between 1903 and 1966. It was one of Portland's four railroad stations for the Portland and Forest Avenue Railroad Company over its history, and one of the two stations in the city at the time of the station's construction. The other was Union Station, which has also been demolished.

The Grand Trunk and steamship offices building still stands, at the corner of India Street and Thames Street. As of 2024, it was in use as the head office of Gorham Savings Bank. A third story was added to this building in 1903.

The station's clock tower was removed in 1948, eighteen years before the station itself was razed.

Construction of the Grand Trunk Railways was delayed by the American Civil War, but used rail was obtained from New Brunswick in 1863 to complete a line from India Street along Middle Street, through Monument Square, along Congress Street, and then down High Street, and westerly along Spring Street to Clark Street. Service with horse-drawn street cars began on 12 October 1863. In 1864, an adjoining line was built along Preble Street from Monument Square and thence along Portland Street and Forest Avenue to Woodfords Corner. This line was later extended to Morrills Corner along Pleasant Avenue and Stevens Avenue. Lines along Congress Street were extended westward to Longfellow Square and eastward to Atlantic Street on Munjoy Hill. Horse-drawn sleighs were substituted for rail cars when snow and ice covered the streets during winter months to avoid ice removal inconveniencing other horse-drawn sleighs.

In the late 19th century, Portland was favored over Boston as the seaport terminus for the Grand Trunk Railway from Montreal. When the Maine Coast Special train to Montreal was withdrawn 1966, the station was abandoned.

== Gallery ==
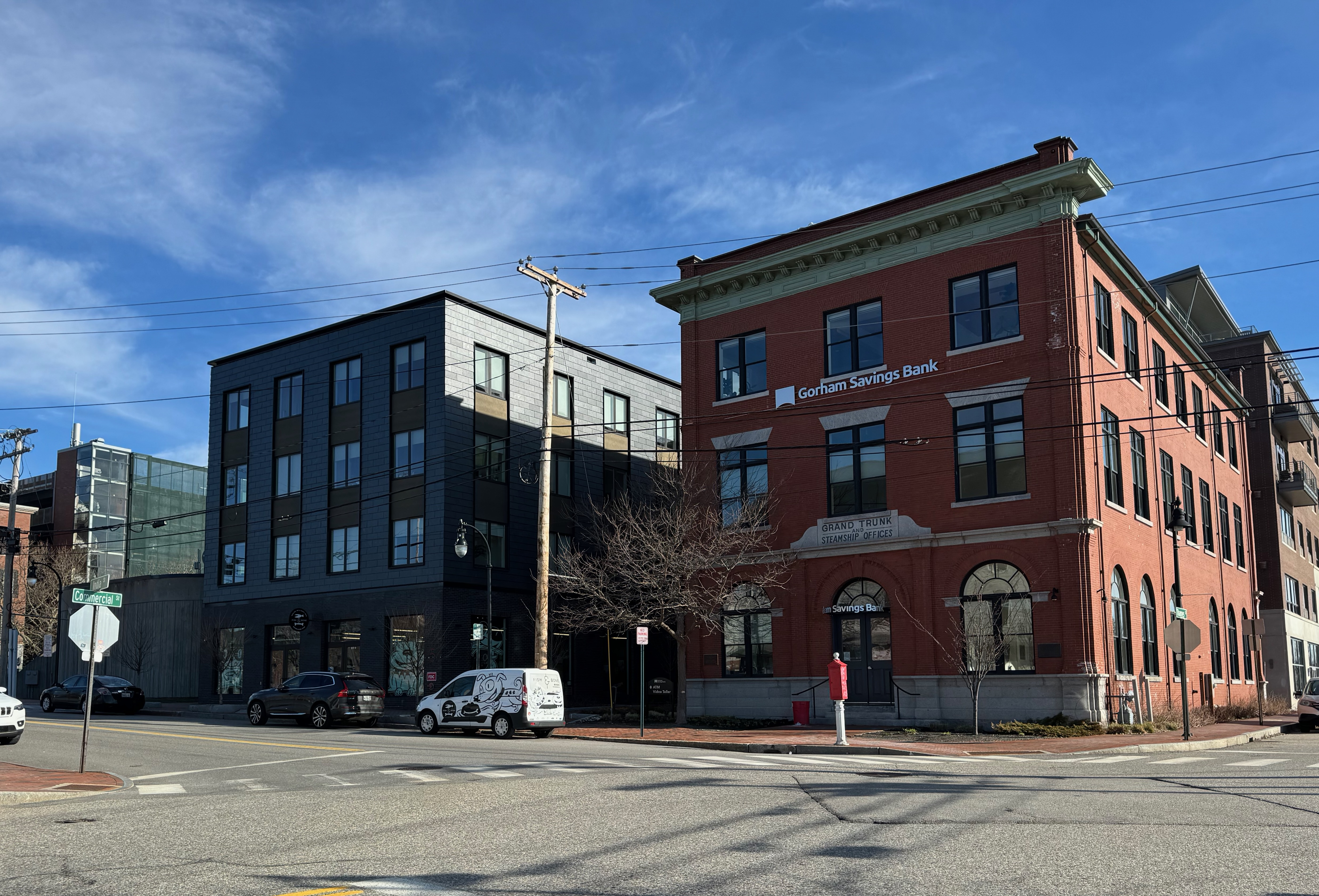
The former footprint of the station, with the extant Grant Trunk and steamship offices building at right (2024)

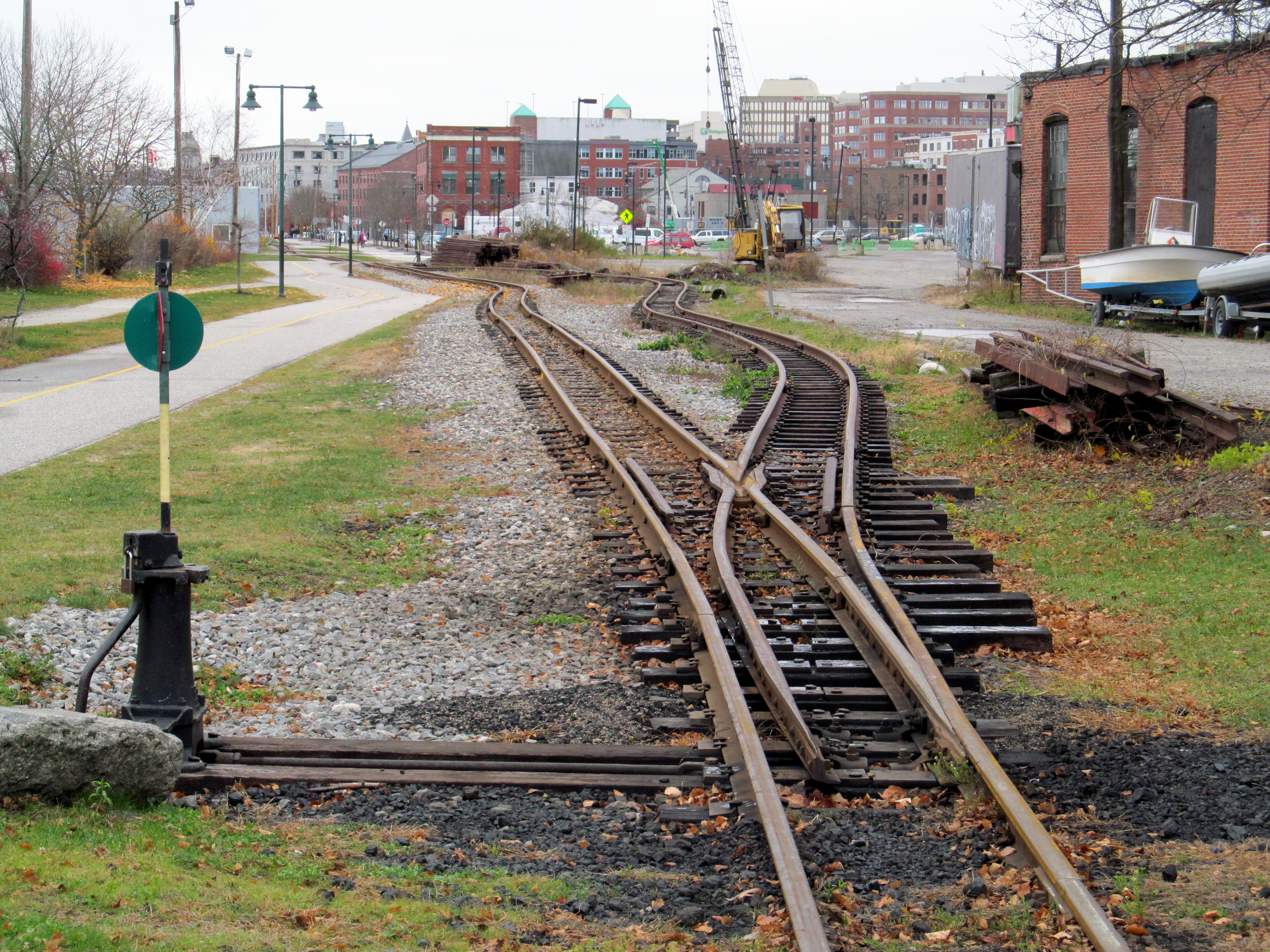
The rear of the office building (left of center) is in view in this 2016 image of the Maine Narrow Gauge Railroad from the Eastern Promenade Trail

== See also ==
- Grand Trunk railway stations (disambiguation)
- Railroad history of Portland, Maine
