= St. Lawrence and Atlantic Railroad =

Railroad in northern New England

- Maximum extent of the SLQ
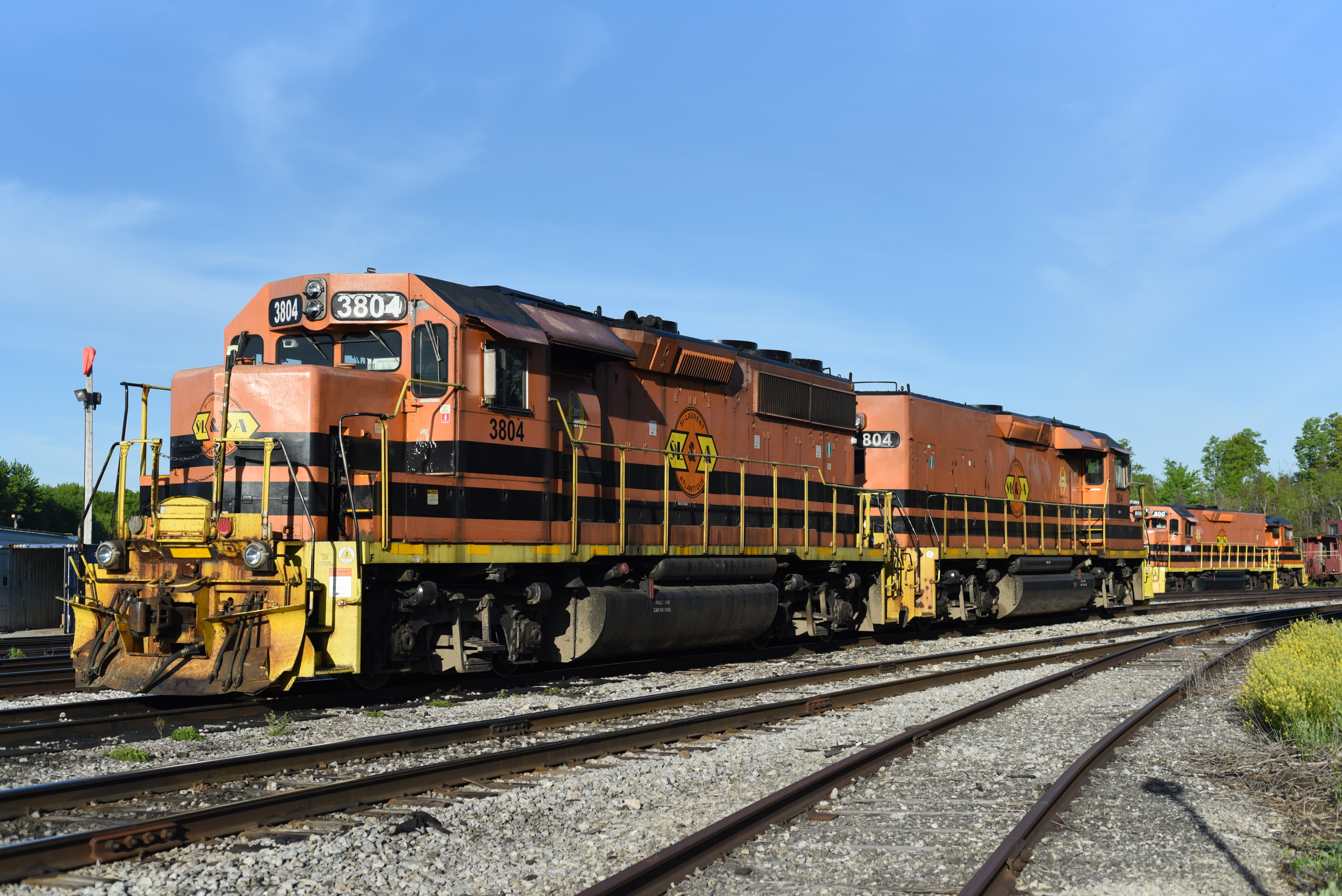
- St. Lawrence and Atlantic Railroad locomotive and slug in Campbellville, Ontario

Overview
- Headquarters: Auburn, Maine, United States
- Reporting mark: SLR
- Locale: western Maine, northern New Hampshire, northeastern Vermont
- Dates of operation: 1853–

Technical
- Track gauge: 4 ft 8 1/2 in (1,435 mm) standard gauge
- Previous gauge: 5 ft 6 in (1,676 mm) broad gauge until about 1873

Other
- Website: https://www.gwrr.com/slr/

St-Laurent et Atlantique Railroad

Overview
- Headquarters: Richmond, Quebec, Canada
- Reporting mark: SLQ
- Locale: South Quebec

Technical
- Track gauge: 4 ft 8 1/2 in (1,435 mm) standard gauge
- Previous gauge: 5 ft 6 in (1,676 mm) broad gauge until about 1873

Other
- Website: https://www.gwrr.com/slq/

The St. Lawrence and Atlantic Railroad (reporting mark SLR), known as St-Laurent et Atlantique Quebec (reporting mark SLQ) in Canada, is a short-line railway operating between Portland, Maine, on the Atlantic Ocean, and Montreal, Quebec, on the St. Lawrence River. It crosses the Canada–US border at Norton, Vermont, and Stanhope, Quebec, and is owned by short-line operator Genesee & Wyoming.

The line was built by the Atlantic and St. Lawrence Railroad in the U.S. and the St. Lawrence and Atlantic Railway in Canada, meeting at Island Pond, Vermont, south of the international border. Major communities served include Portland and Lewiston in Maine; Berlin, New Hampshire; Island Pond, Vermont; and Sherbrooke and Montreal in Quebec.

== History ==
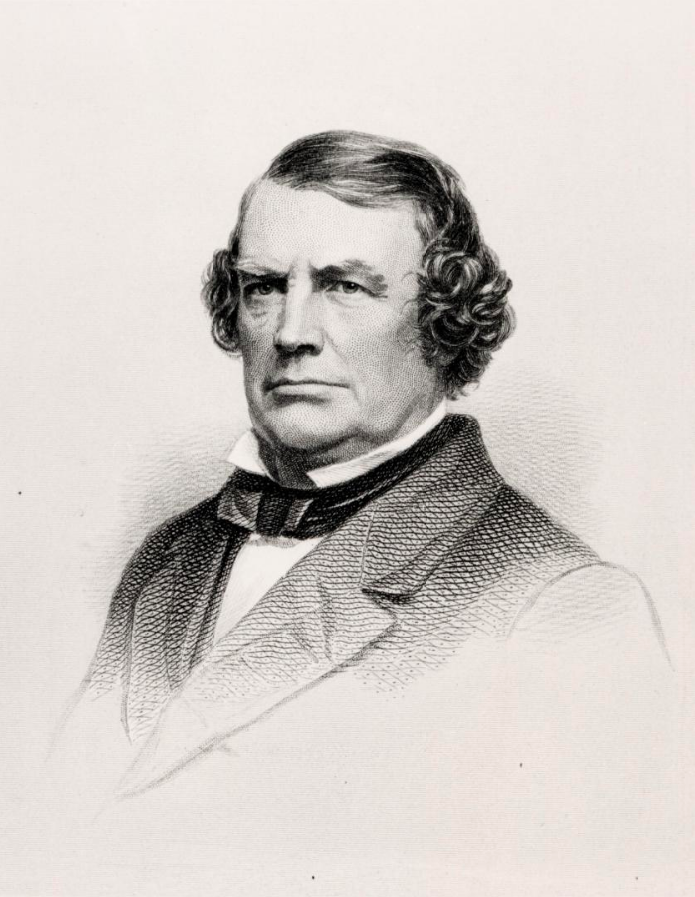
Founder John A. Poor

The line was proposed as a connection between Portland and Sherbrooke, Canada East, in 1844 by Portland entrepreneur John A. Poor. Portland was desperate to connect its ice-free port with Montreal, and Maine was at risk of being eclipsed by a similar proposal running from nearby Boston, Massachusetts. Writer, critic, and Atlantic and St. Lawrence Railroad investor, John Neal wrote of the necessity "to drive Boston out of the business and secure [a] monopoly." Montreal saw an advantage in linking with the smaller port at Portland, and Poor's idea became a reality.

=== Atlantic and St. Lawrence Railroad ===
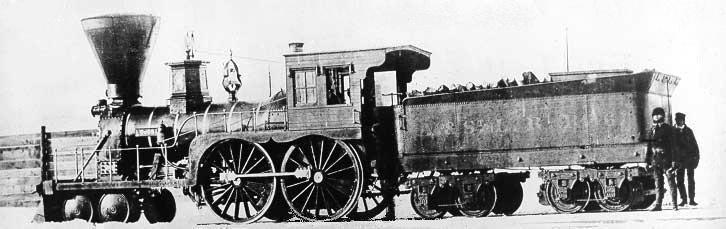
Portland Company locomotive Coos c. 1856

The Atlantic and St. Lawrence Railroad was chartered in Maine on February 10, 1845; New Hampshire on July 30, 1847; and Vermont on October 27, 1848, to build a continuous line from Portland northwest into northeastern Vermont. William Pitt Preble was the railroad's first president. The line was originally built to the Portland gauge of 5 ft 6 in (1,676 mm). Construction started in Portland on July 4, 1846. The first section, from Portland to Yarmouth, opened July 20, 1848. Further extensions up the Royal River to Danville (now Auburn) opened in October 1848 and to Mechanic Falls in February 1849. Construction then proceeded up the Little Androscoggin River to Oxford in September 1849 and Paris in March 1850. Construction was then completed down the Alder River to the Androscoggin River at Bethel in March 1851. Simultaneous construction of Portland gauge connecting railways occurred from Danville and Mechanic Falls. Sections into and within New Hampshire opened to Gorham on July 23, 1851, and Northumberland July 12, 1852, and the full distance to Island Pond, Vermont, on January 29, 1853.

Construction began with three locomotives built in Britain, but John Poor had organized the Portland Company with locomotive erecting shops adjacent to the railroad yard and wharves at Portland. Approximately half of the early Portland Company production was 25 Portland-gauge locomotives built for the Atlantic & St. Lawrence. These 4-4-0 locomotives weighing 20 to 25 tons were augmented by locomotives built elsewhere when the road was completed to Montreal.

The St. Lawrence and Atlantic Railway was chartered to build the part of the line in Canada East, and on August 4, 1851, agreed to meet the Atlantic and St. Lawrence at Island Pond. Regular operations began April 4, 1853, between Montreal (Saint-Lambert) and Portland.

=== Grand Trunk Railway ===
Four months later, on August 5, 1853, the Grand Trunk Railway leased the two companies, giving the Toronto-Montreal line an extension east to Portland. A branch was also built from Richmond, Canada East, northeast to Point Levi, across the St. Lawrence River from Quebec City. Grand Trunk enlarged their waterfront facilities at Portland by purchasing land from Henry Wadsworth Longfellow. The increased traffic from Portland and Point Levi to Montreal placed significant demands on the small train ferry service across the St. Lawrence at Montreal, and this was replaced by the Victoria Bridge by 1860.

The locomotives burned wood exclusively until the cost of seasoned firewood increased during the winter of 1871–72 to make other fuels competitive. Peat from Quebec was used briefly before coal became the standard. Coal was used exclusively between Portland and Gorham by 1879, but use of wood continued for a few more years north of Gorham.

Interchange with standard gauge railroads became a problem during the 1860s. Grand Trunk equipped approximately 1,000 freight cars with experimental "sliding-wheels" in 1863 at company shops in Sarnia, Canada West, and Pointe-Saint-Charles in Montreal. Gauge could be adjusted by removing and inserting axle pins on special tapered-gauge track segments at interchange points. Safety problems were reported despite high maintenance costs. All lines west of Montreal were converted to standard gauge on October 3 and 4, 1873. Grand Trunk purchased 200 standard gauge locomotives (including 62 from Portland Company) and converted 135 old locomotives. Ten thousand standard gauge bogies were purchased for conversion of freight cars. The railway from Portland to Montreal was standard-gauged in September 1874.

During the week preceding the change, each section foreman made sure all ties on his section were properly adzed and clear of gravel. Spikes were laid out beside each tie, and some sidings were re-gauged before the main line. Two eight-man squads were assigned to each five-mile section. They slept by the track with their tools on the night of September 25, 1874. Work began at Portland when the last Portland gauge train from Island Pond arrived at 2:00 am September 26, and the main line was ready for standard gauge trains by 9:00 am the same day. The change resulted in nearly complete replacement of locomotives on the New England line, since most of the Portland gauge locomotives were sold or scrapped. Five new "Burnside" 2-6-0 locomotives from Rhode Island Locomotive Works had arrived in Portland from Boston to resume service.

The GTR line to Portland was built during the boom period for New England textile mills, and various mill towns in northern New England soon saw an influx of French Canadian workers who quickly found work in the region.

Grain elevators were constructed at Portland to facilitate storage and loading of Canadian wheat for export. The first elevator was built on Galt Wharf in 1863. The elevator with capacity for 150,000 bushels burned in 1873, and was replaced with a larger elevator in 1875. Portland Elevator Company built an elevator with capacity of one million bushels in 1897, and New England Elevator Company built the largest elevator on the Atlantic coast at the time, with capacity of 1.5 million bushels, in 1901.

By 1881, all wooden bridges had been replaced by iron and stone structures, and steel rail had replaced early iron rail. Fourteen steamship lines were serving the Grand Trunk wharves at Portland by 1896 with connections to Bristol, London, Liverpool, Glasgow, and Antwerp. Fifty steamships visited Portland that winter, and as many as seven could load simultaneously from the Grand Trunk wharves. More powerful 2-6-0 mogul locomotives increased freight train length from 16 to 30 cars.

Passenger train service included the Seaside and White Mountains Special (later called the International Limited) from Chicago to Portland, equipped with plush silk and mahogany-finished Pullman, dining, sleeping, parlor, and observation cars including a library and a barber shop. By 1946 this required a change of train in Montreal, taking #16 from Montreal to Portland (and #17 the reverse trip). As late as summer, 1963, the Canadian National/Grand Trunk operated this route as a weekends only train, equipped with coffee shop car in addition to coach, for the route from Montreal to Portland.

=== Canadian National Railways Berlin subdivision ===
The GTR's bankruptcy in the early 1920s saw it nationalized by the Canadian federal government, which merged it into the nascent Canadian National Railways (CNR). Unfortunately for Portland, the CNR also included various other rail lines to ice-free Canadian ports in the Maritimes, notably Halifax, Nova Scotia, and their now ex-GTR mainline to Montreal soon became a secondary mainline under CNR as traffic dropped significantly. Within a decade, annual export tonnage leaving Portland declined to 21,000 tons, from an average of 600,000 tons during the early 1920s.

Canadian National class S 2-8-2s pulled through freight trains between Portland and Island Pond, while class O USRA 0-6-0s worked those yards and class N-4 2-8-0s pulled local wayfreights within the United States. Passenger trains were usually pulled by locomotives working out of Montreal. Canadian National class E-7 2-6-0 #713 worked the Lewiston branch, and was preserved at the Canadian Railway Museum when 16 class GR-17 EMD GP9 diesel locomotives replaced steam power in 1957. Five of the GP9s were equipped with steam generators for passenger service, while the other eleven had dynamic brakes for freight service.

Paper mills remained a major source of traffic. Annual car loadings in 1973 were 12,758 for Berlin, 5,794 for Groveton, and 1,161 for Mechanic Falls; but the Boston and Maine Railroad carried some of the traffic for the New Hampshire mills. Dressed meat from Chicago to Maine continued to use the shorter Canadian routing as long as railway reefers remained competitive with highway trucking.

From 1934 to 1939 the twice-weekly Maine Coast Special from Montreal left the Grand Trunk at Yarmouth Junction to follow the Maine Central Railroad to Portland's Union Station and then the Boston and Maine Railroad to the beach communities of Old Orchard Beach and Kennebunkport during July and August. The CNR class U-1 4-8-2 locomotives pulling as many as 17 car trains around Dominion Day would be serviced at Rigby Yard in South Portland before making the return trip. Daily except Sunday passenger trains 16 and 17 continued to carry a railway post office between Portland and Island Pond through the 1950s. These trains remained popular with summer vacationers from Montreal, and summer weekend service continued until 1967 after daily train service ended in 1960. Passengers were transported by bus from Portland station to Old Orchard Beach. Portland station was razed in 1966.

Despite the decline in traffic being handled over the line, its strategic connection to the Atlantic Ocean for Montreal saw other use arise during World War II. Bauxite from British Guiana was shipped via rail from Portland to avoid shipping losses to U-boats during the Battle of the St. Lawrence. The Portland–Montreal Pipe Line was built to carry oil from terminals in South Portland to refineries in Montreal; the pipeline followed the GTR route along certain parts and is still in use today. Wharves at Portland were used by the United States Navy as Casco Bay became destroyer base Sail during the Battle of the Atlantic. Grand Trunk Piers housed a Navy supply pier and training schools for combat information center (CIC), night visual lookouts, surface and aircraft recognition, search and fire control radar operators, gunnery spotting, anti-aircraft machine guns, and anti-submarine warfare (ASW) attack.

CNR (CN after the 1960s) continued to operate the Portland-Sherbrooke line as its Berlin Subdivision, but traffic continued to decline. By the late 1980s, following deregulation of the U.S. railroad industry, it became a candidate for divestiture to a shortline operator.

=== St. Lawrence and Atlantic Railroad ===
In 1989, the St. Lawrence and Atlantic Railroad (SLR) was formed to take over operation of the Island Pond-Portland section, and several years later this was extended to the border at Norton. In 1998, following Canadian deregulation, the short-line operator formed a subsidiary St. Lawrence and Atlantic Railroad (Quebec) to operate the remaining line from the border at Norton through to Sainte-Rosalie, where it connects with the CNR main line to Montreal.

==== Reactivated passenger service ====
In April 2012, the Maine Department of Transportation put a project out to bid which would "purchase, design, and construct a portion of rail line for future passenger service to Lewiston and Auburn." The potential passenger route would operate on tracks operated by the St. Lawrence and Atlantic Railroad. As of 2013 prospective operators of a night train from Montréal to Boston are attempting to get access to the St. Lawrence and Atlantic right-of-way for a 2014-passenger launch.

The section of the SLR between Portland and Auburn has been disused since 2015 and was officially abandoned a decade later.

==== Bridge collapse ====
A bridge over the Saint-François River near Brompton, Quebec, collapsed on January 13, 2018. There were no injuries. The preliminary opinion is that the collapse was due to an ice jam and rapid water level rise following an unseasonal day of rain.

== Route ==
- Milepost 0: Portland terminal facilities including wharves, grain elevators, Portland Company shops, and interchange with Portland Terminal Company until 1984.
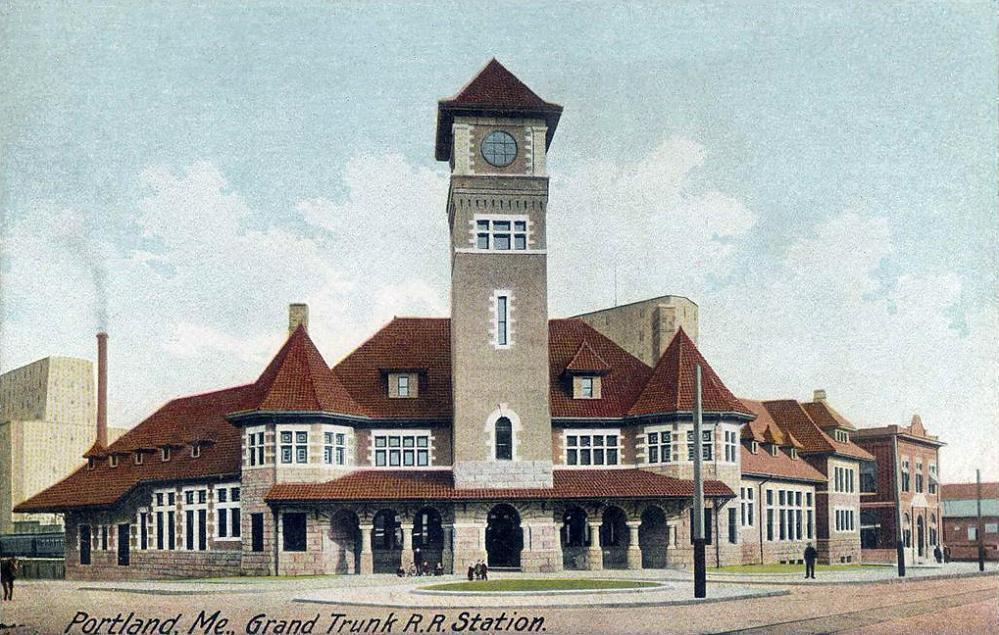
  Grand Trunk Station at Portland, Maine built in 1903
- Milepost 1.4: Portland Junction with Portland and Rochester Railroad from 1871 to 1947

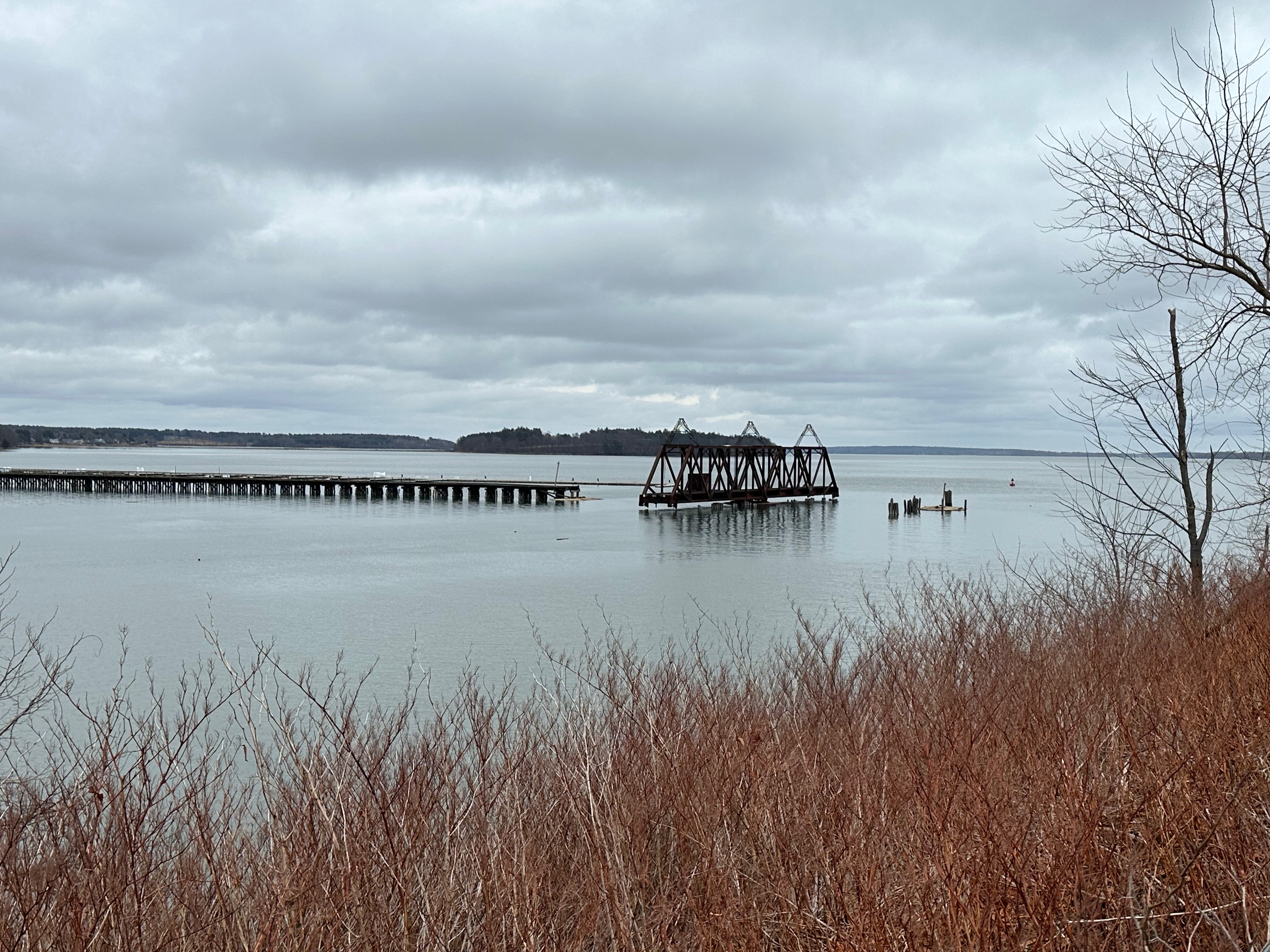
Back Cove Trestle, Portland

- Milepost 1.5: Back Cove Trestle abandoned following fire damage in 1984
- Milepost 2.4: East Deering stockyard with resting pens for 2,500 head of export livestock and 15-stall roundhouse with steam locomotive servicing facilities (station closed 1939)
- Milepost 4.4: Presumpscot River bridge
- Milepost 5.5: Falmouth station razed about 1932
- Milepost 8.9: Cumberland
- Milepost 11.3: Yarmouth Station built in 1906; closed in 1968
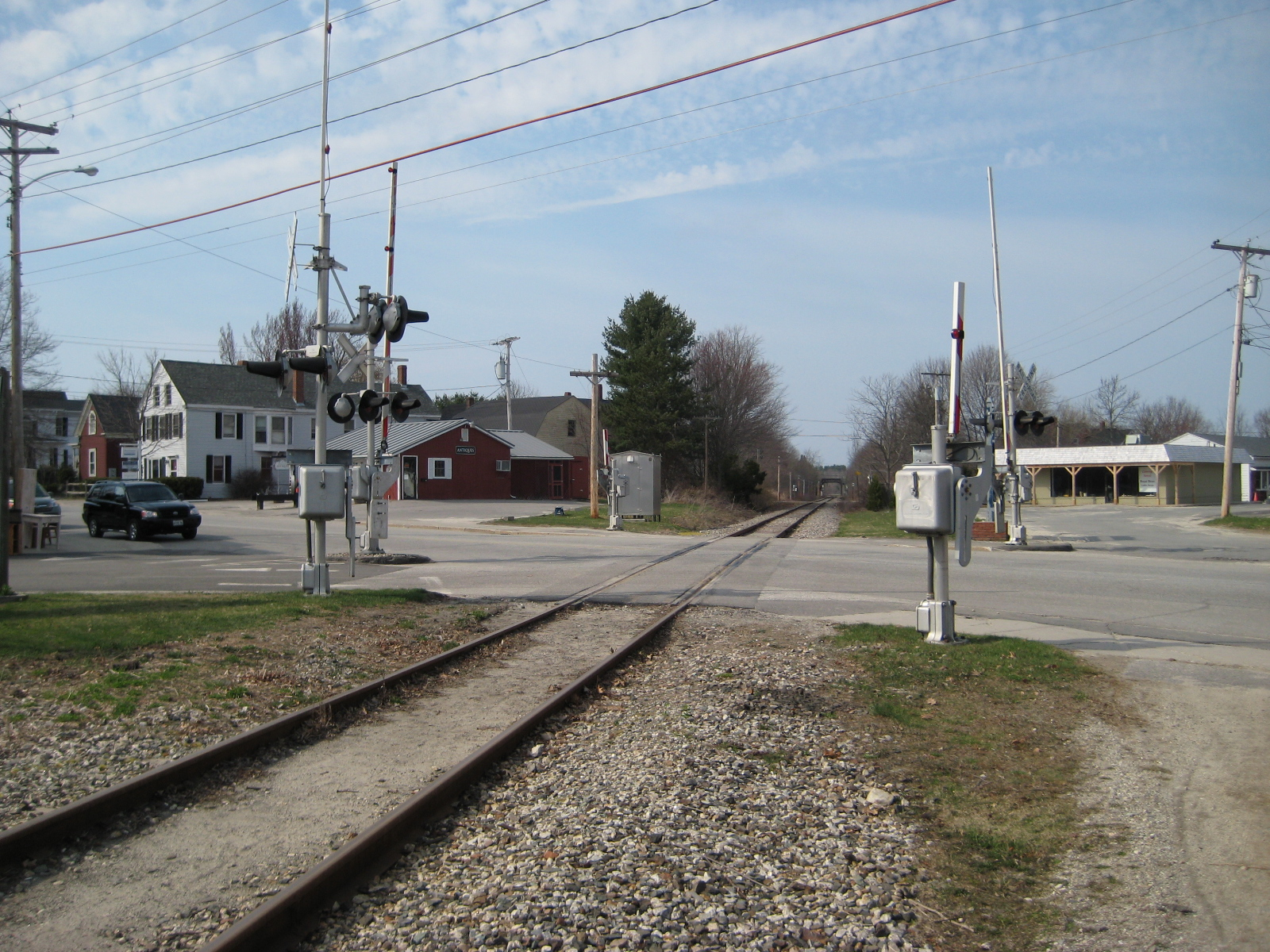
  A stretch of the railroad passing through Yarmouth, Maine, beside Yarmouth Station, looking north

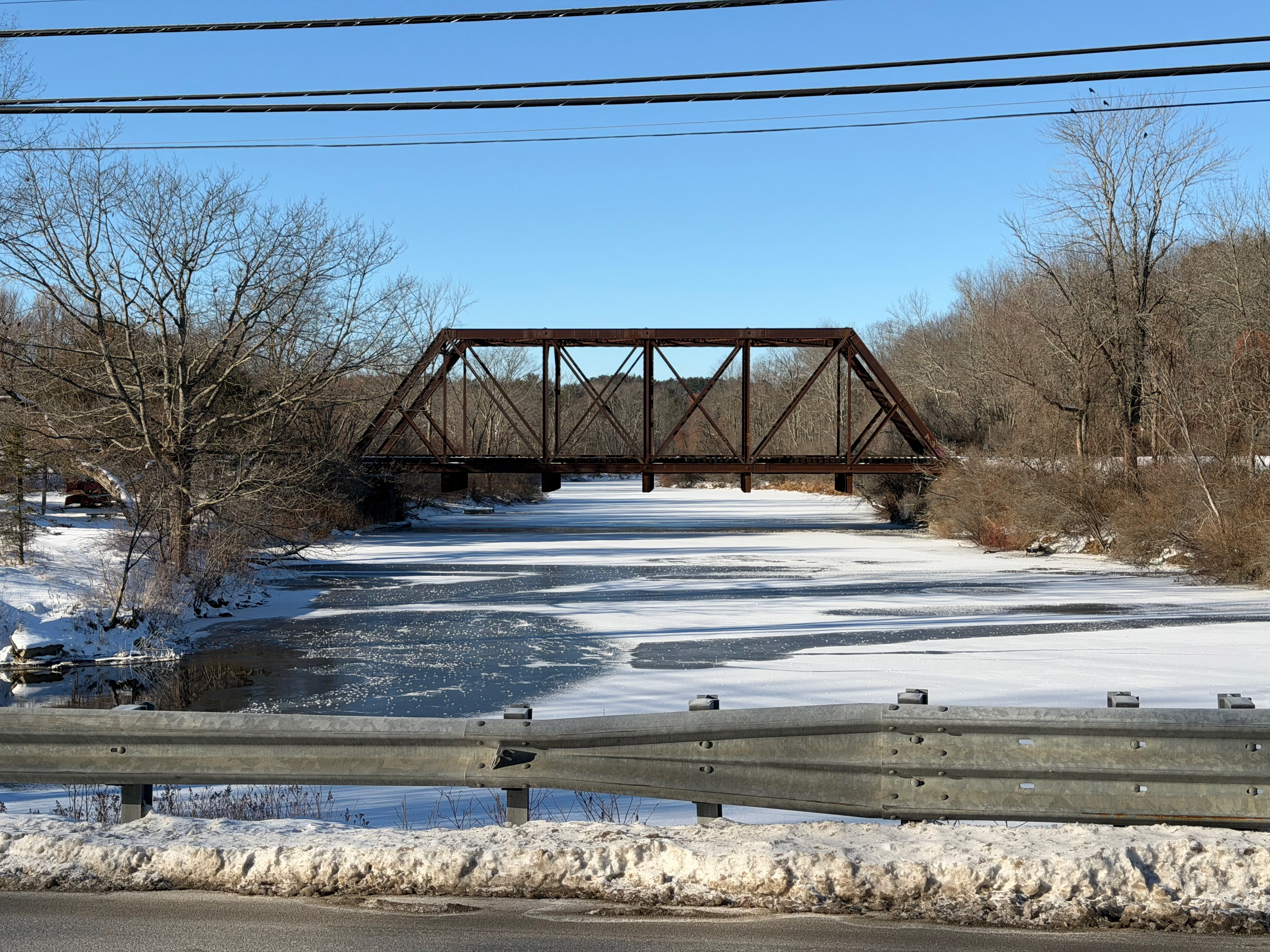
Trestle in Yarmouth, Maine

- Milepost 11.7: Royal River trestle
- Milepost 12.2: Yarmouth Junction with Kennebec and Portland Railroad (later Maine Central Railroad "lower road") since 1849
- Milepost 15.3: Dunn's
- Milepost 18.4: Pownal 69-car passing siding (station closed 1953)
- Milepost 22.7: New Gloucester station burned in 1940
- Milepost 23.9: Royal River bridge
- Milepost 24.3: Royal River bridge
- Milepost 24.8: Royal River bridge
- Milepost 26.8: Royal River bridge
- Milepost 27.6: Danville Junction with Androscoggin and Kennebec Railroad (later Maine Central Railroad "back road")
- Milepost 29.7: Lewiston Junction with 5.4-mile branch to Lewiston, Maine since 1874 (Lewiston station closed 1971)
- Milepost 32.1: Empire Road passed under Portland and Rumford Falls Railway from 1893 to 1952 (station closed 1941)
- Milepost 36.2: Mechanic Falls junction with Buckfield Branch Railroad, later Portland and Rumford Falls Railway until 1952 (station razed 1968)
- Milepost 36.3: Little Androscoggin River bridge
- Milepost 40.9: Oxford station closed 1965
- Milepost 46.7: Little Androscoggin River bridge
- Milepost 47.3: South Paris junction with 1.4-mile branch to Norway, Maine since 1879 and 3-stall roundhouse until 1929 (Norway station closed in 1964 and was razed in 1968)
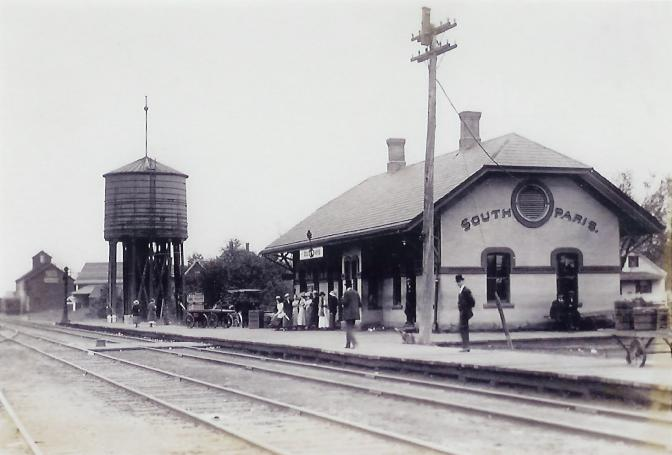
  South Paris station built in 1888
- Milepost 55.6: Little Androscoggin River bridge
- Milepost 55.7: Bates 65-car passing siding and roundhouse for 1.1 percent Bacon's Grade helper engine to Bryant Pond. Feldspar was mined, processed and loaded here for the manufacture of porcelain from 1925 to 1988. Station built in 1851, enlarged in 1879, and closed in 1967 was razed in 1968.
- Milepost 58: Little Androscoggin River bridge
- Milepost 58.9: Little Androscoggin River bridge
- Milepost 61.8: Bryant Pond 2-stall roundhouse until 1923 (station built in 1851 closed in 1958)
- Milepost 65.3: Locke Mills
- Milepost 67: Alder River bridge
- Milepost 68.2: Alder River bridge
- Milepost 69.6: Alder River bridge
- Milepost 70.1: Bethel station built in 1865 was enlarged in 1899 and closed and razed in 1968
- Milepost 74: Allen's
- Milepost 75: Pleasant River bridge
- Milepost 80.1: Gilead, Maine junction with Wild River Railroad from 1891 to 1904
- Milepost 80.5: Wild River bridge
- Milepost 82.6: state line
- Milepost 85.9: Shelburne, New Hampshire
- Milepost 87.9: Rattle River bridge
- Milepost 88: Rattle River bridge
- Milepost 88.2: Rattle River bridge
- Milepost 88.4: east end of Androscoggin River causeway
- Milepost 89.2: west end of Androscoggin River causeway
- Milepost 91: Peabody River trestle
- Milepost 91.6: Gorham 12 stall roundhouse and coaling tower until 1956 with shops from 1869 to 1902 Station built in 1907 housed the Gorham Historical Society when railroad occupancy ended.
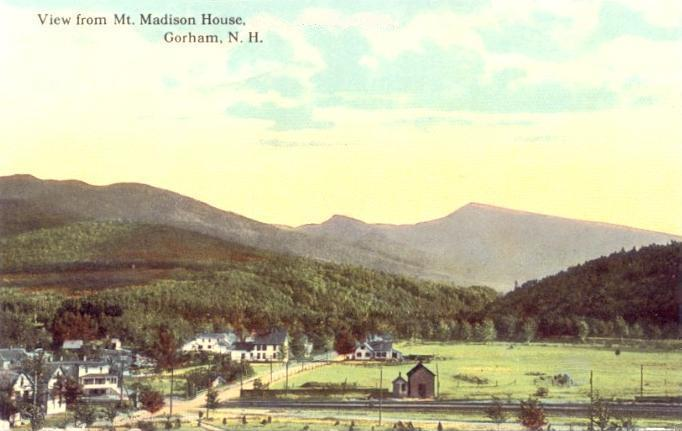
  Grand Trunk at Gorham about 1912
- Milepost 92.8: Moose River bridge
- Milepost 93.1: Moose Brook bridge
- Milepost 93.3: Boston and Maine Railroad to Berlin, New Hampshire crosses overhead on high bridge
- Milepost 96: Cascade
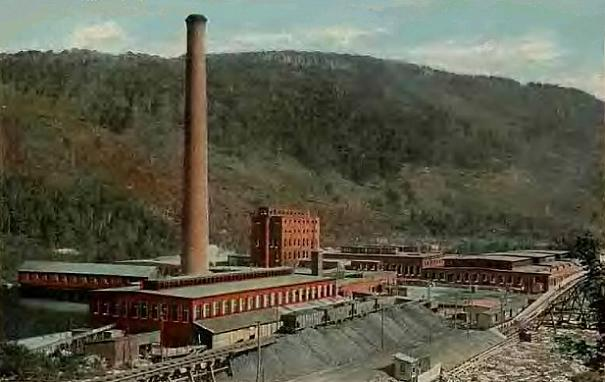
  Cascade Mill about 1920
- Milepost 97.9: Berlin junction with Berlin Mills Railway
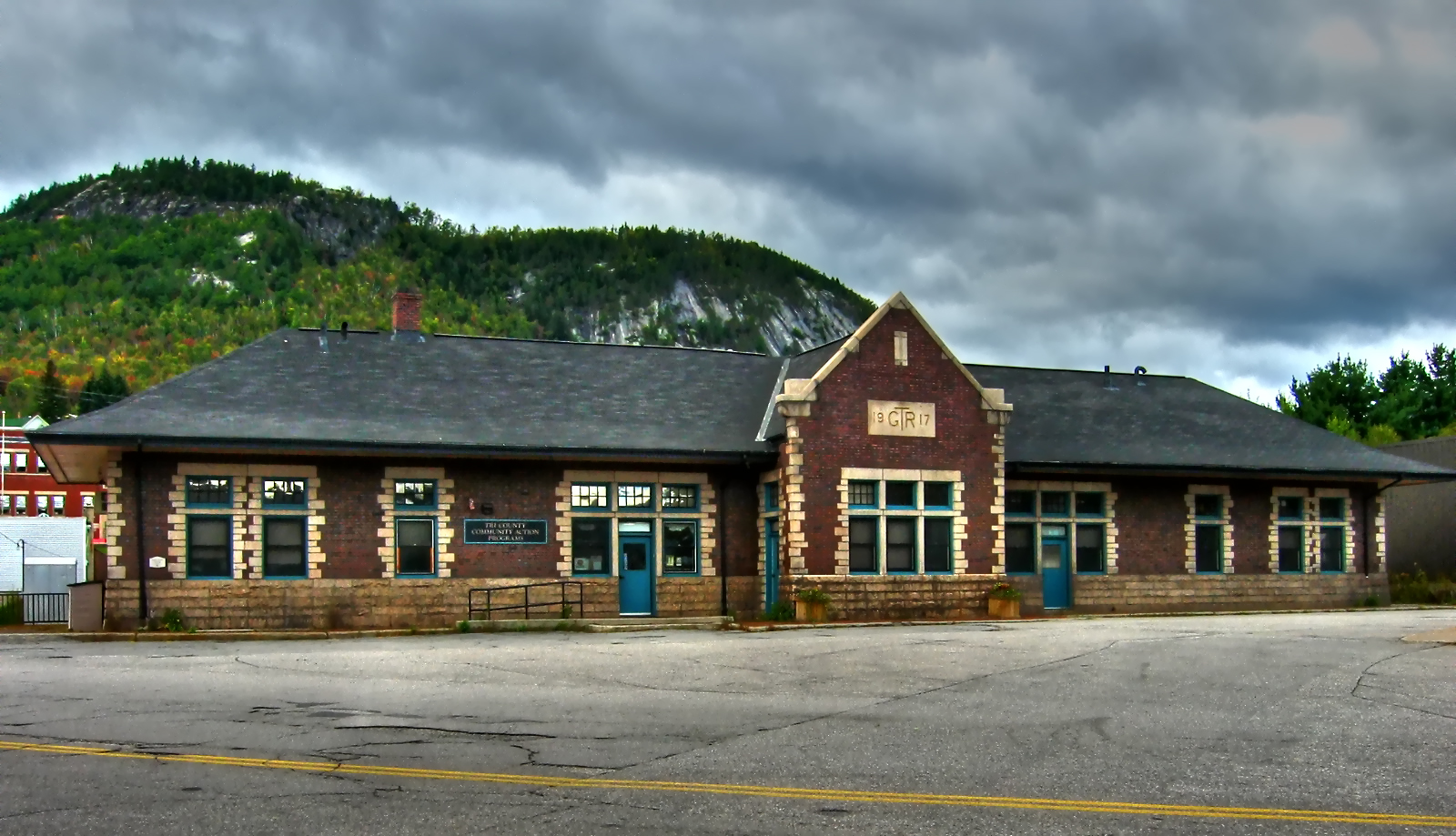
  Berlin station built in 1917
- Milepost 101: Dead River bridge
- Milepost 103.3: Copperville station closed 1929
- Milepost 103.7: Upper Ammonoosuc River bridge
- Milepost 106.3: Upper Ammonoosuc River bridge
- Milepost 108.7: Upper Ammonoosuc River bridge
- Milepost 109.4: West Milan junction with Upper Ammonoosuc Railroad from 1893 to 1903 with 37-car siding for pulpwood loading (station closed 1957)
- Milepost 110.2: Upper Ammonoosuc River bridge
- Milepost 110.5: Upper Ammonoosuc River bridge
- Milepost 111.6: Crystal
- Milepost 111.7: Phillips Brook bridge
- Milepost 114.3: Percy 76-car passing siding and 13-car team track
- Milepost 116.4: Stark
- Milepost 117.3: Upper Ammonoosuc River bridge
- Milepost 121.8: Upper Ammonoosuc River bridge
- Milepost 122.2: Groveton junction with the Boston and Maine Railroad Groveton branch and (from 1948 to 1976) the Maine Central Railroad Beecher Falls branch
- Milepost 126.4: Mapleton
- Milepost 129.5: Masons crossing the Maine Central Railroad Beecher Falls branch from 1887 until Maine Central negotiated trackage rights from Groveton to North Stratford in 1948
- Milepost 134.6: North Stratford, New Hampshire junction with the North Stratford Railroad from 1887 to 1989
- Milepost 134.7: Connecticut River bridge
- Milepost 142.3: Wenlock, Vermont station closed 1925
- Milepost 145.3: East Brighton
- Milepost 149.5: Island Pond ice harvesting facilities for reefer icing and passenger car air-conditioning until 1959 and division point yard with 20-stall roundhouse and locomotive servicing facilities until 1966

Preceded by Livonia, Avon and Lakeville Railroad	Short Line Railroad of the Year; 1998	Succeeded by South Central Florida Express
