= Mount Crescent =

Mountain in Randolph, New Hampshire

Highest point
- Elevation: 3,251 ft (991 m)
- Coordinates: 44°24′16″N 71°17′39″W

Geography
- Location: Coos County, New Hampshire
- Parent range: Crescent Range
- Topo map: USGS Pliny Range

Mount Crescent is a mountain located in the Crescent Range of the White Mountains in Randolph, New Hampshire. It is 3,251 ft (991 m) high, and its summit is the second highest mountain summit in Randolph, after Black Crescent Mountain (3,264 feet, 995 m). Both mountains are in Randolph's Ice Gulch Town Forest. On the 1896 topographic map, Mount Crescent is shown as "Randolph Mtn." with an elevation of 3,280 ft, and Black Crescent is shown as "Mt. Crescent" with an elevation of 3,322 ft.

The southeast side of Mount Crescent drains into Moose Brook, thence into the Androscoggin River, which drains into Merrymeeting Bay, the estuary of the Kennebec River, and thence into the Gulf of Maine. The southwest end of Mt. Crescent drains into Carlton Brook, thence into the Moose River, a different stream which is also a tributary of the Androscoggin River. The northwest side of Crescent drains into the Upper Ammonoosuc River, thence into Connecticut River, which drains into Long Island Sound in Connecticut.

Mount Crescent may be reached by hiking trails from either the north, via Pond of Safety Road (sometimes shown as Stag Hollow Road) and Bog Dam Road, or from the south, via Randolph Hill Road.

== See also ==
- List of mountains in New Hampshire
- White Mountain National Forest
