= Moose Brook State Park =

State park in New Hampshire, US

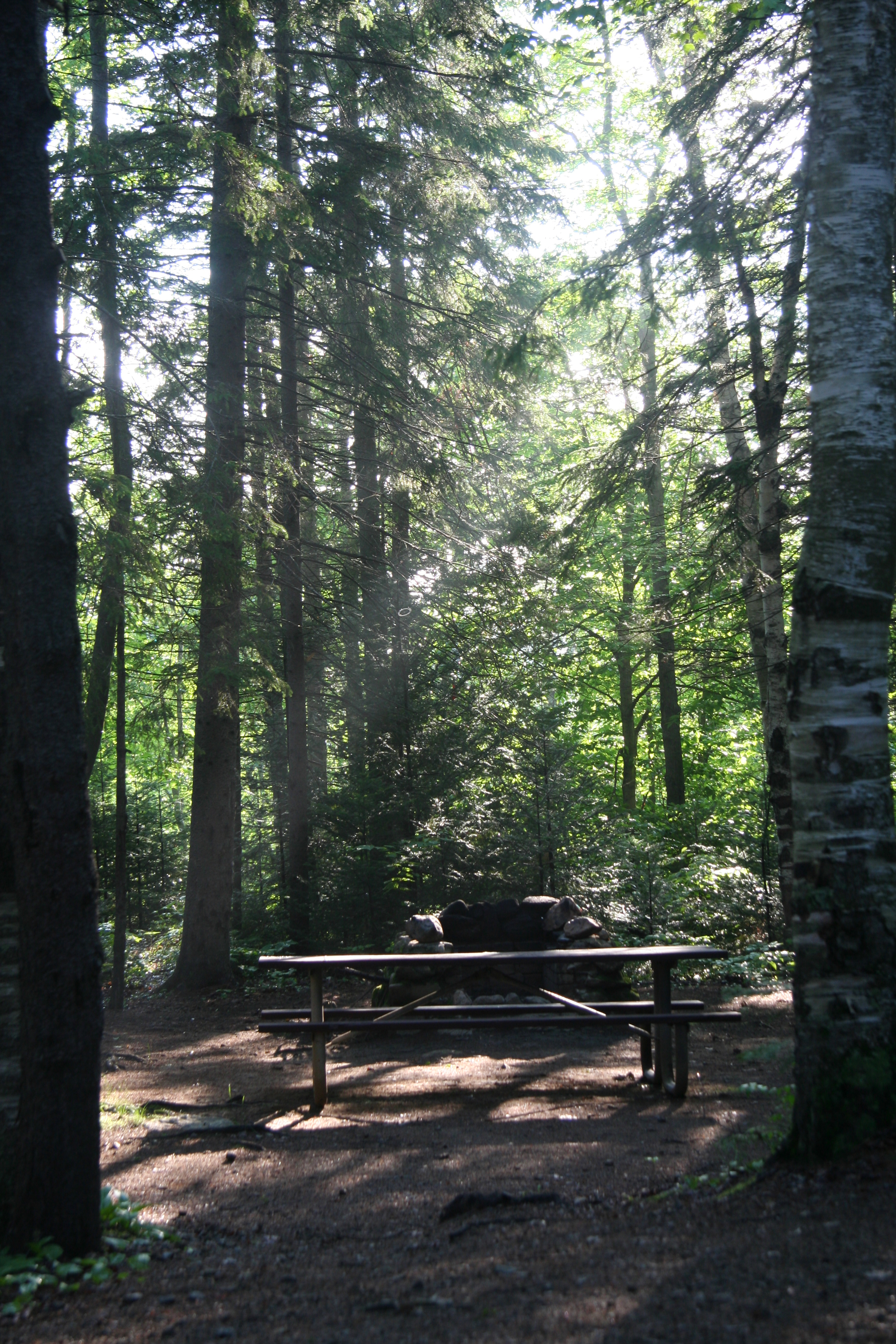

- Location within New Hampshire
- Interactive map of Moose Brook State Park
- Location: Coos County, New Hampshire, United States
- Coordinates: 44°24′28″N 71°13′50″W
- Area: 87 acres (35 ha)
- Elevation: 1,070 ft (330 m)
- Established: 1936
- Administrator: New Hampshire Division of Parks and Recreation
- Website: Official website
- New Hampshire State Parks

Moose Brook State Park is a New Hampshire state park in Coos County, New Hampshire in the United States. The park occupies 87 acres (35 ha) amidst 668 acres of surrounding state forest. The park was built by the Civilian Conservation Corps during the Great Depression. It opened to the public in 1936.

== History ==
Moose Brook State Park was constructed during the Great Depression by workers from the Civilian Conservation Corps. The Civilian Conservation Corps (CCC) was a work relief program for young men from unemployed families, established in 1933. As part of President Franklin D. Roosevelt's New Deal legislation, it was designed to combat unemployment during the Great Depression. The CCC operated in every U.S. state. Young men from all over the country were assigned to the many CCC camps that were constructed in rural areas throughout the United States.

Moose Brook State Park is considered to be an excellent example of CCC design. The corps built park facilities and trails using the natural resources that were at hand. Cabins and other facilities were built with rocks and logs that were taken from the land surrounding their construction sites. The original park offices, built by the CCC, are still in use today. Other park facilities that were built by the CCC and are still in use include the bathhouse, campground and swimming area.

== Geology ==
Moose Brook State Park is within the White Mountains. The White Mountains are part of the larger Appalachian Mountains. The magma intrusions forming the White Mountains today were created 124 to 100 million years ago as the North American Plate moved westward over the New England hotspot.

The park is named for Moose Brook, a tributary of the Androscoggin River. Moose Brook rises in the town of Randolph, New Hampshire, in Ice Gulch, a notch in the Crescent Mountain Range north of the White Mountains. Moose Brook exits the gulch by dropping over Peboamauk Fall, then continues east through the park to reach the Androscoggin River in the town of Gorham.

== Recreation ==
Moose Brook State Park is open May through October. Recreation activities include camping, picnicking, mountain biking, swimming, hiking and fishing. There are 59 campsites at the park in a variety of areas. Some are wooded and shaded and others are in open, sunny areas. The campground opens on Memorial Day weekend and closes Columbus Day weekend. Moose Brook State Park is used as a base for visitors to the White Mountains and the Presidential Range.
