= Gorham High School =

Gorham High School may refer to a school in the United States:

- Gorham High School (Maine)
- Gorham High School (New Hampshire)
