= Gorham High School (New Hampshire) =

Coordinates: 44°23′24″N 71°10′41″W

Location
- 120 Main Street; Gorham, Coos County, New Hampshire, 03581; United States

Information
- Type: Public
- Principal: David Morrissette
- Staff: 16.50 (FTE)
- Grades: 9–12
- Enrollment: 149 (2024–2025)
- Student to teacher ratio: 9.03
- Campus: Small town
- Color
- Mascot: Husky
- Website: www.gmhsnh.org

Gorham High School is a public, co-educational school located in Gorham, New Hampshire. Students are enrolled from the surrounding areas of Gorham, Randolph, and Shelburne. The school enrolls students in grades 9 through 12.

== Sport ==
Sports at Gorham High School include men's and women's soccer, cross country, basketball, alpine skiing, baseball, and softball in NHIAA class S.

== Academic activities ==
Gorham High School has a Math League, National Honor Society, National Junior Honor Society, FBLA (Future Business Leaders of America), a Middle and High School Student Council Network, a school newspaper entitled the Kaleidoscope Tribune, a Community Service Group (CSG), a Cancer Outreach Organization (a branch of CSG) and many more.

The school has had success with the "We The People...."...Bicentennial Constitution competition. In 1992, 14 members of the class of 1994 (and several from the class of 1993) won the statewide competition, then went on to win the Northeastern Regional in Washington, D.C.
