= Moose Brook (New Hampshire) =

- Location within New Hampshire Location within the United States

Location
- Country: United States
- State: New Hampshire
- County: Coos
- Towns: Randolph, Gorham

Physical characteristics
- Source: Ice Gulch
  - location: Randolph
  - coordinates: 44°25′10″N 71°16′56″W
  - elevation: 2,441 ft (744 m)
- Mouth: Androscoggin River
  - location: Gorham
  - coordinates: 44°24′7″N 71°11′48″W
  - elevation: 778 ft (237 m)
- Length: 4.7 mi (7.6 km)

Basin features
- Tributaries
  - left: Perkins Brook

Moose Brook is a 4.7-mile-long (7.6 km) stream in northern New Hampshire in the United States. It is a tributary of the Androscoggin River, which flows south and east into Maine, joining the Kennebec River near the Atlantic Ocean.

Moose Brook rises in the town of Randolph, in Ice Gulch, a sharp notch in the Crescent Range in the northern White Mountains. The floor of Ice Gulch is filled with giant, angular boulders under which ice can stay present throughout the summer. Moose Brook exits the gulch by dropping over Peboamauk Fall, then continues east through Moose Brook State Park to reach the Androscoggin River in the town of Gorham, New Hampshire. The brook should not be confused with the Moose River, which enters the Androscoggin less than one mile downstream of Moose Brook.

== See also ==
- List of rivers of New Hampshire
