= Gorham, New Hampshire =

- Town
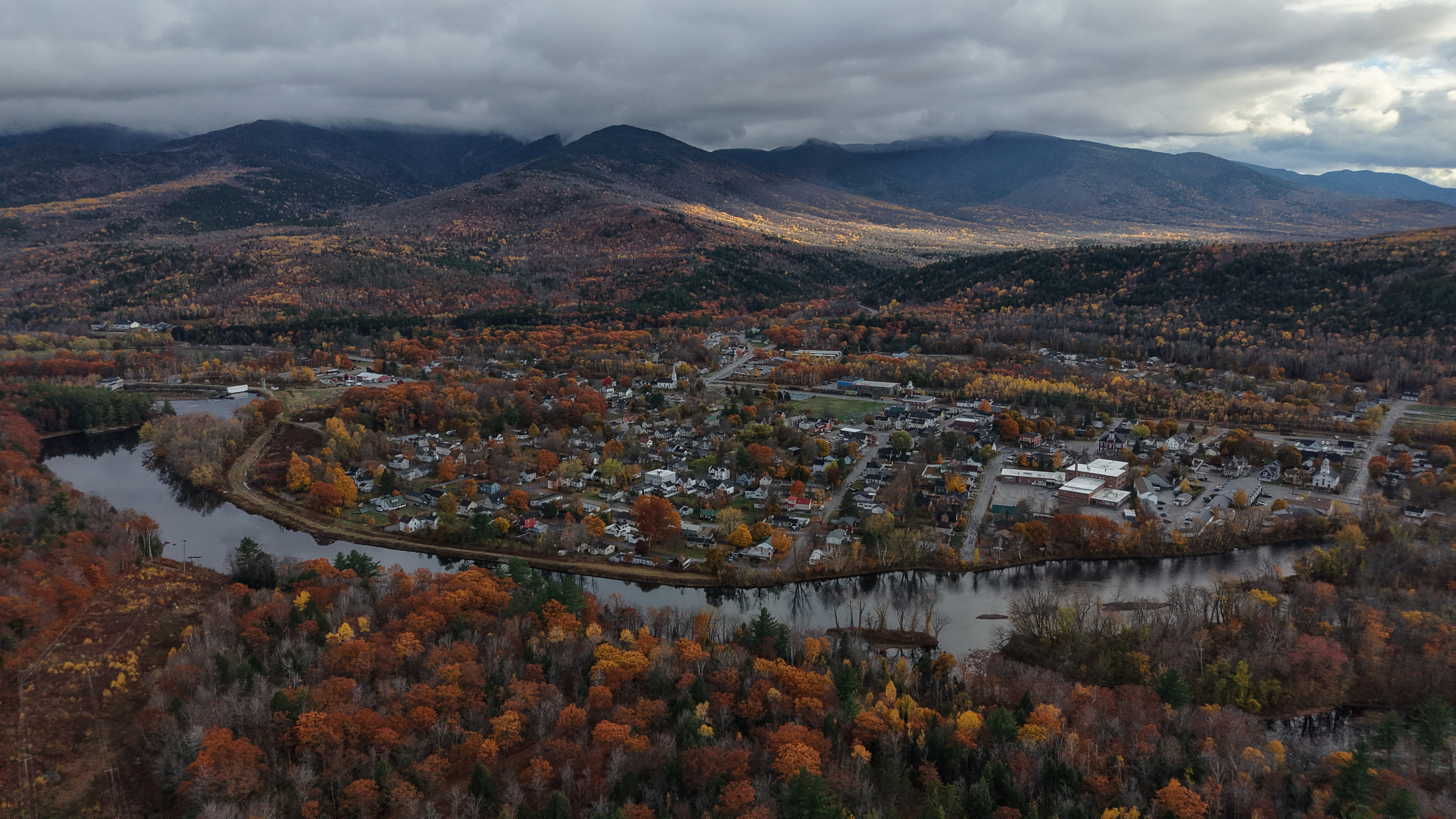
- Gorham, NH, from the north

- Logo
- Nickname: "Switzerland of America"
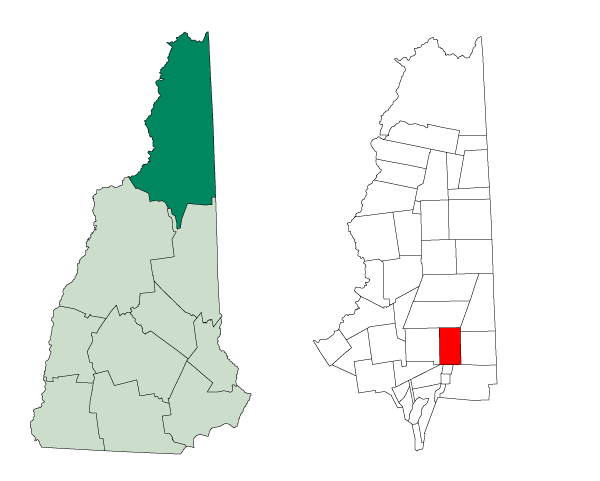
- Location in Coös County, New Hampshire
- Coordinates: 44°23′41″N 71°12′13″W
- Country: United States
- State: New Hampshire
- County: Coös
- Incorporated: 1836
- Villages: Gorham; Cascade; Upper Village

Area
  - Total: 32.3 sq mi (83.7 km^{2})
  - Land: 31.8 sq mi (82.4 km^{2})
  - Water: 0.50 sq mi (1.3 km^{2}) 1.50%
- Elevation: 840 ft (260 m)

Population (2020)
  - Total: 2,698
  - Density: 85/sq mi (32.7/km^{2})
- Time zone: UTC-5 (Eastern)
  - Summer (DST): UTC-4 (Eastern)
- ZIP code: 03581
- Area code: 603
- FIPS code: 33-30260
- GNIS feature ID: 873607
- Website: www.gorhamnh.gov

Gorham is a town in Coös County, New Hampshire, United States. The population was 2,698 at the 2020 census, and an estimated 2,661 in 2025. Gorham is located in the White Mountains, and parts of the White Mountain National Forest are in the south and northwest. Moose Brook State Park is in the west. Tourism is a principal business. It is part of the Berlin, NH-VT Micropolitan Statistical Area.

The central village in Gorham, where 1,851 people resided at the 2020 census, is defined as the Gorham census-designated place and is located between the two intersections of US 2 and NH 16, along the Androscoggin River.

== History ==
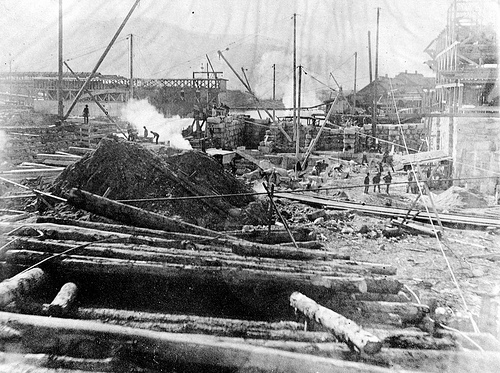
Construction of the Cascade Mill began in 1904, by the Brown Company.

The community was first chartered in 1770 by colonial Governor John Wentworth as a part of Shelburne, called "Shelburne Addition". Gorham was first settled about 1802, by Robert Sargent and others, but for years it contained little more than rocky farms, small logging operations, and a few stores and stables. When incorporated in 1836, the town had only 150 inhabitants. It was named "Gorham" at the suggestion of Lot Davis, a resident from Gorham, Maine, and a relative of the Gorham family which incorporated that town in 1764.

The St. Lawrence and Atlantic Railroad (later the Grand Trunk Railway) arrived in 1851. Located halfway between Montreal and the New England seacoast, Gorham developed into a railroad town, with a major locomotive yard and repair facility. With trains came tourists, and the Mount Madison House, Alpine House, Gorham House and Willis House opened. Crowds went from Boston and the seacoast to White Mountain Station, and from there to the Glen House in Pinkham Notch and Mount Washington. In 1861, travelers made the first trek up the Mount Washington Carriage Road, winding 8 miles (13 km) to the summit of the 6,288-foot (1,917 m) mountain. "The Road to the Sky" was an engineering feat of its day, advertised as "the first man-made attraction in the United States". It would be renamed the Mount Washington Auto Road, and remains popular today.

Railroads benefited local industries as well, hauling freight for mills run by water power from the Androscoggin River. Logging flourished, with boards and building timber manufactured by the Libby and the Peabody lumber companies. That business would eventually decline, as would railroads. In 1973, the town's train depot, built in 1907, was scheduled for demolition. The Gorham Historical Society saved the building, which now serves as a headquarters and museum. It features displays on area history, with a collection including locomotives, boxcars and a caboose.

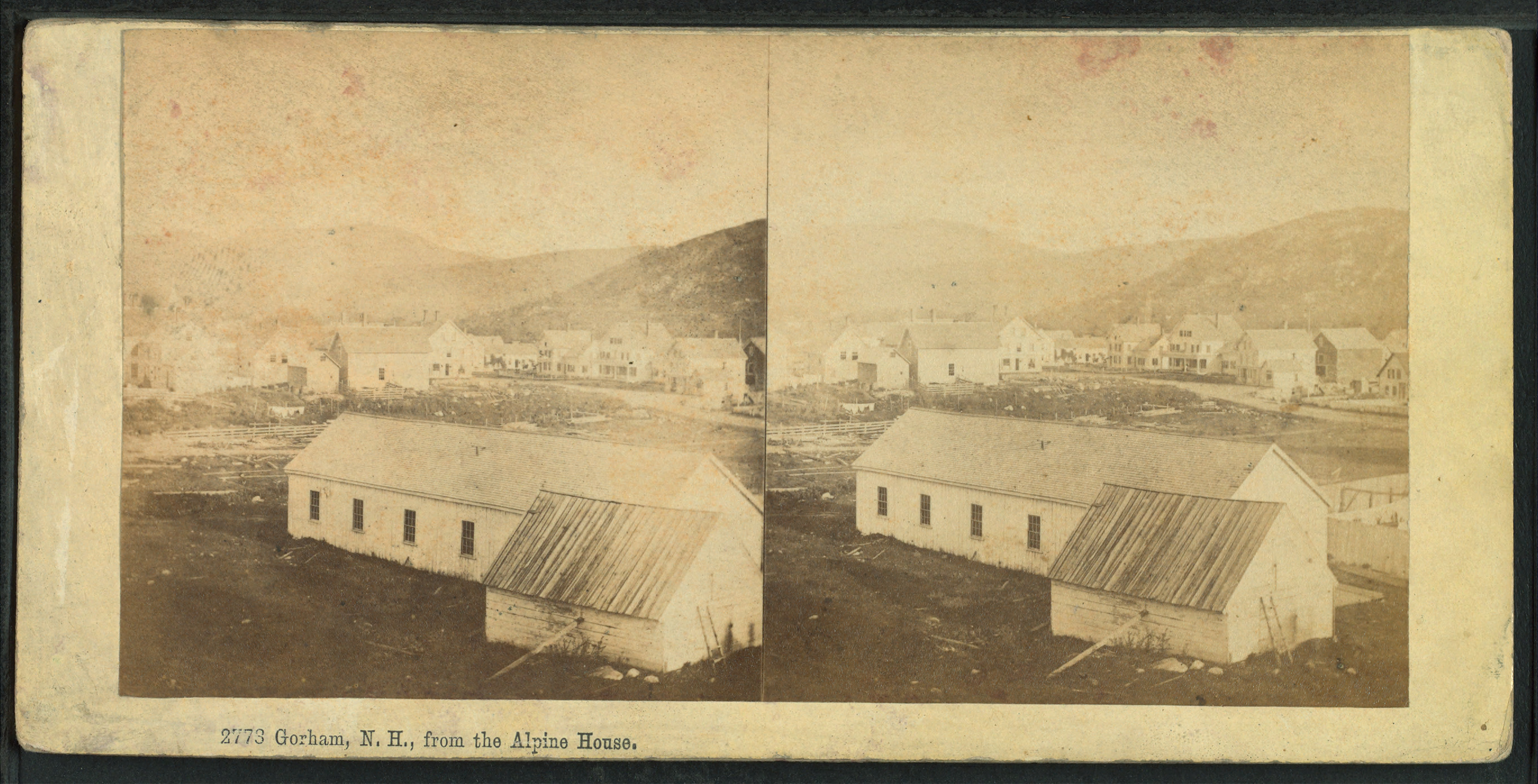
Stereoscopic photograph c. 1860

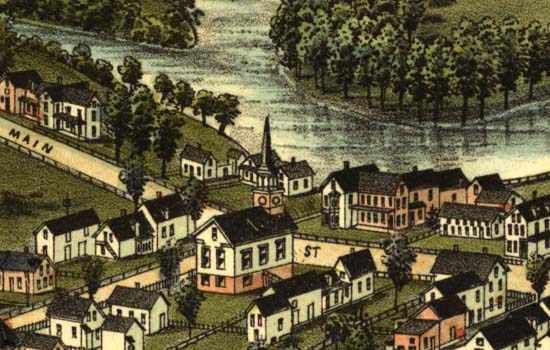
View in 1888

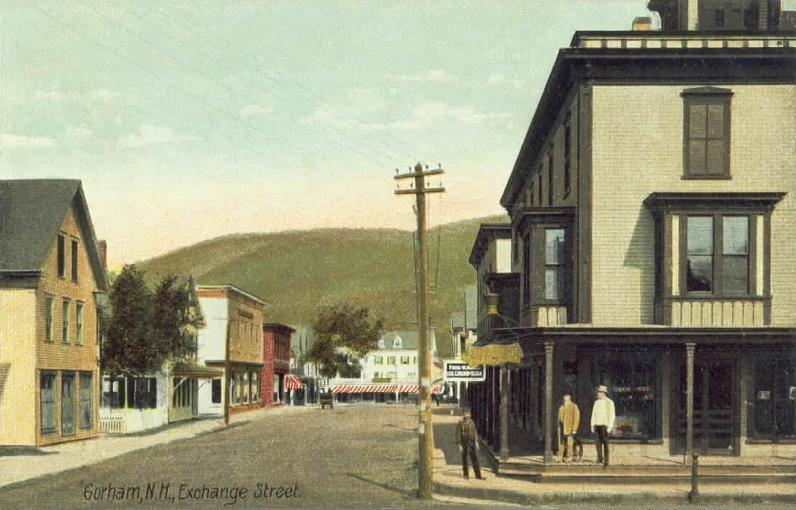
Exchange Street in 1908

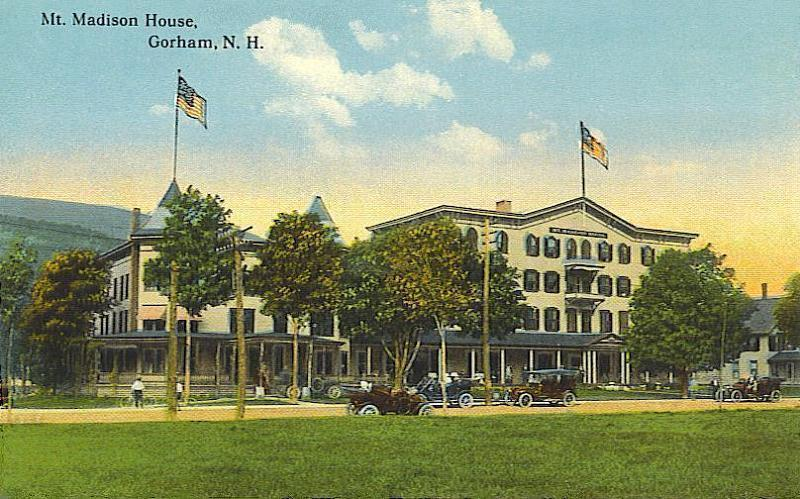
The Mount Madison House c. 1912

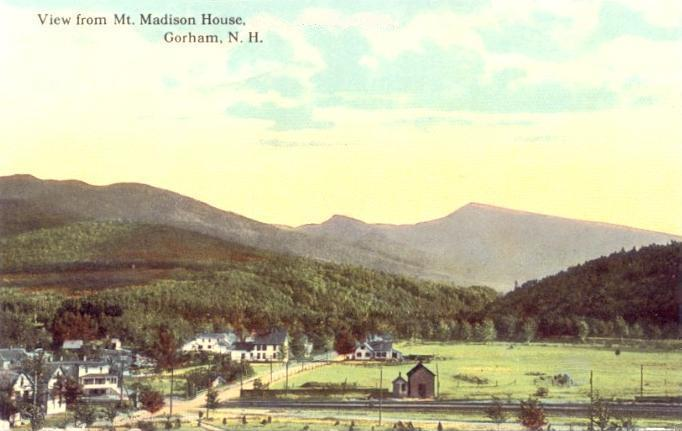
View from Mount Madison House c. 1912

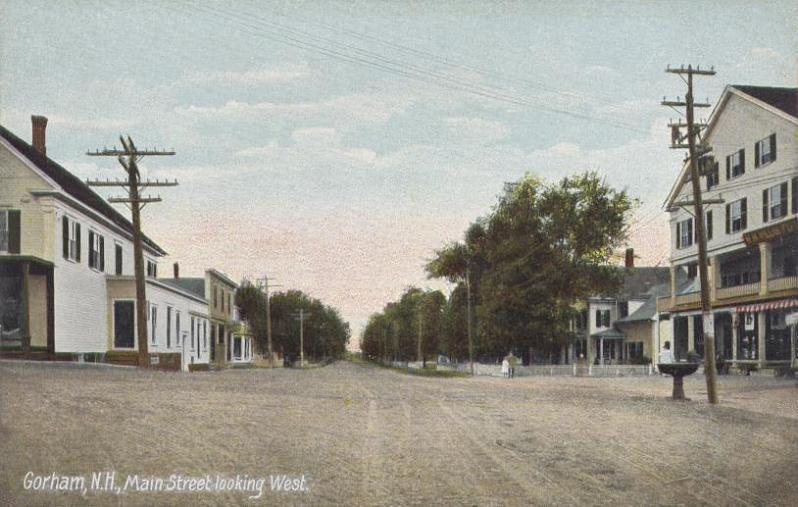
Main Street c. 1908

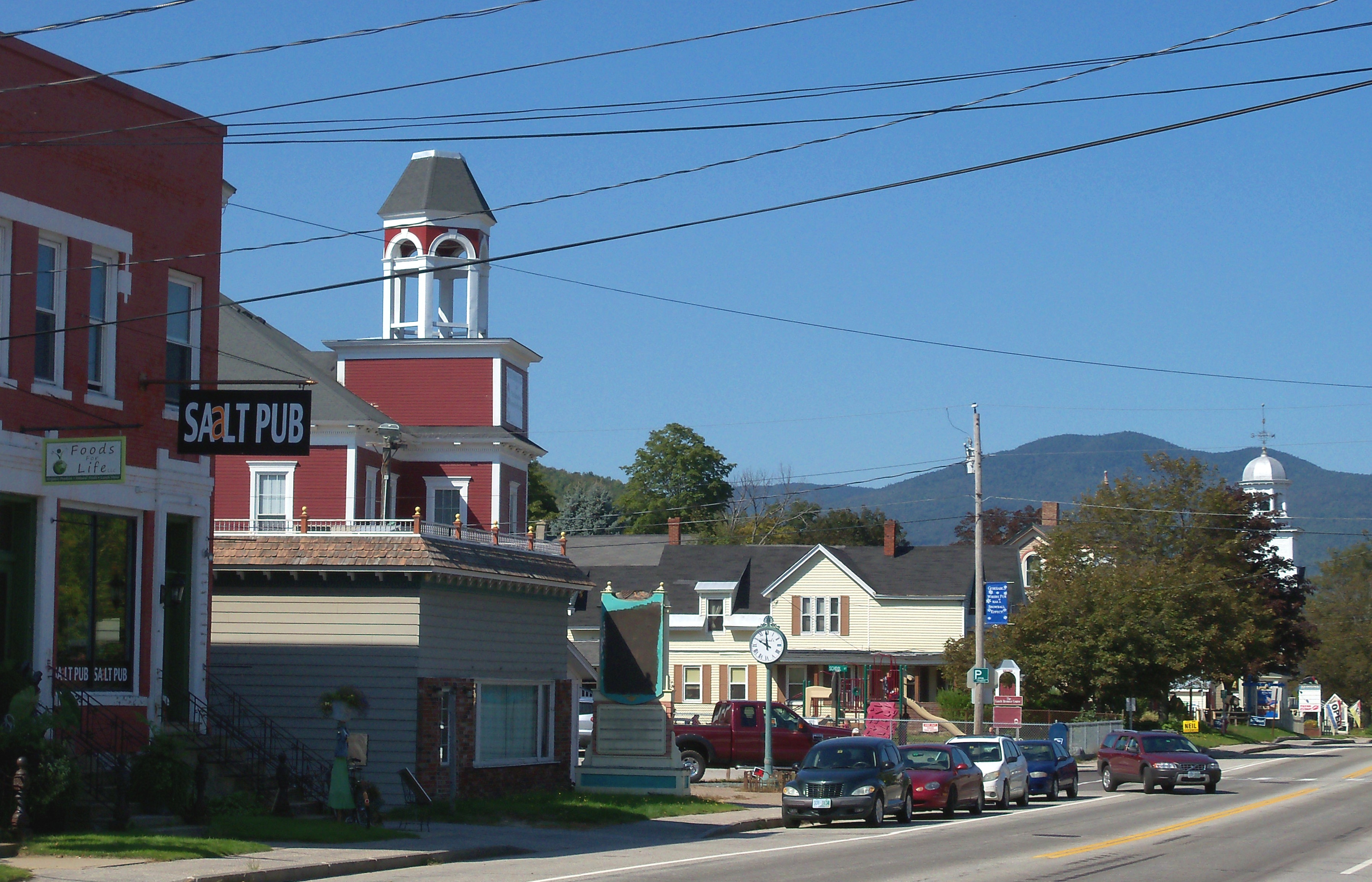
Buildings along Main Street

== Geography ==
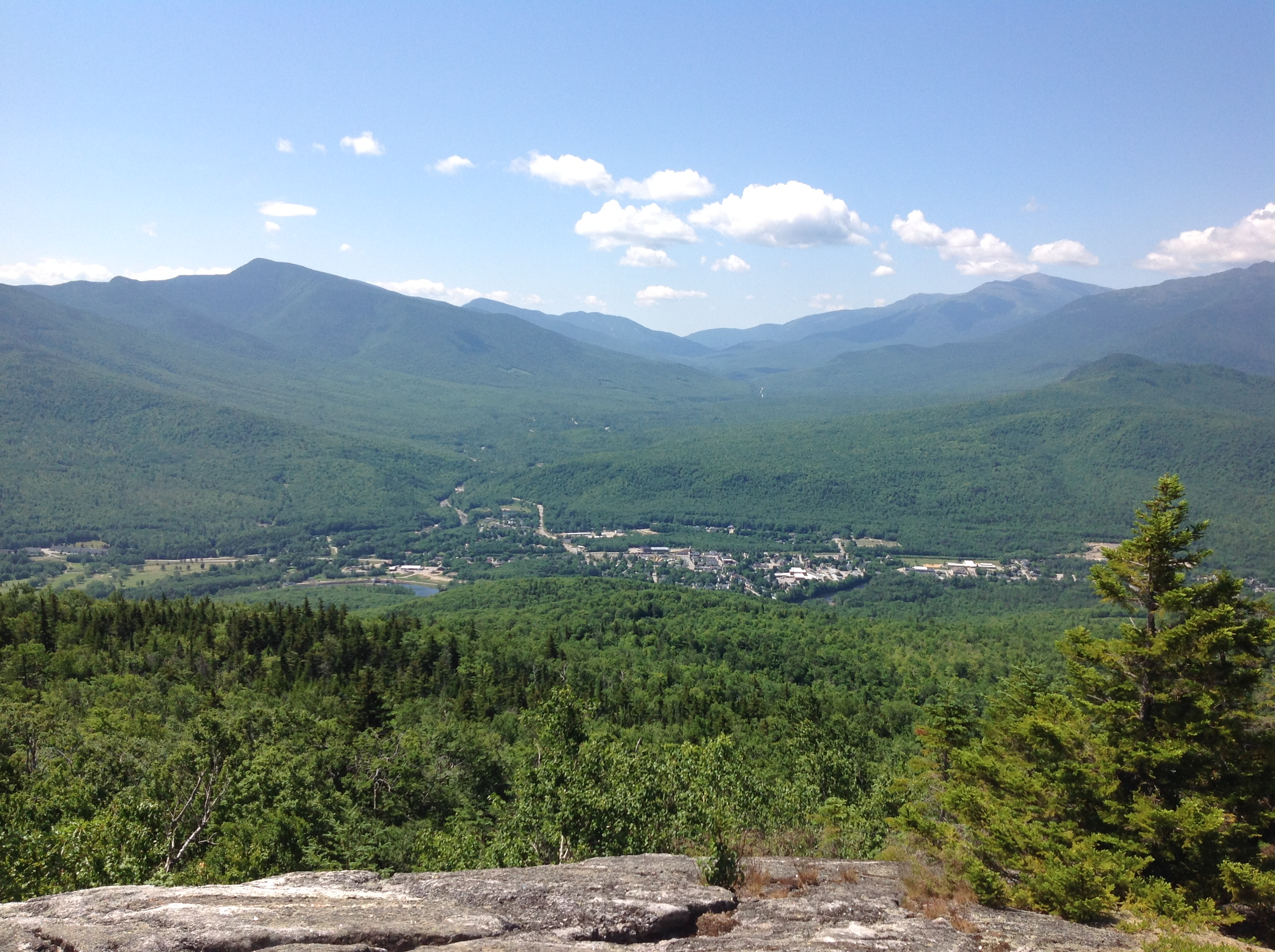
View of Gorham from Mt. Hayes, 2016

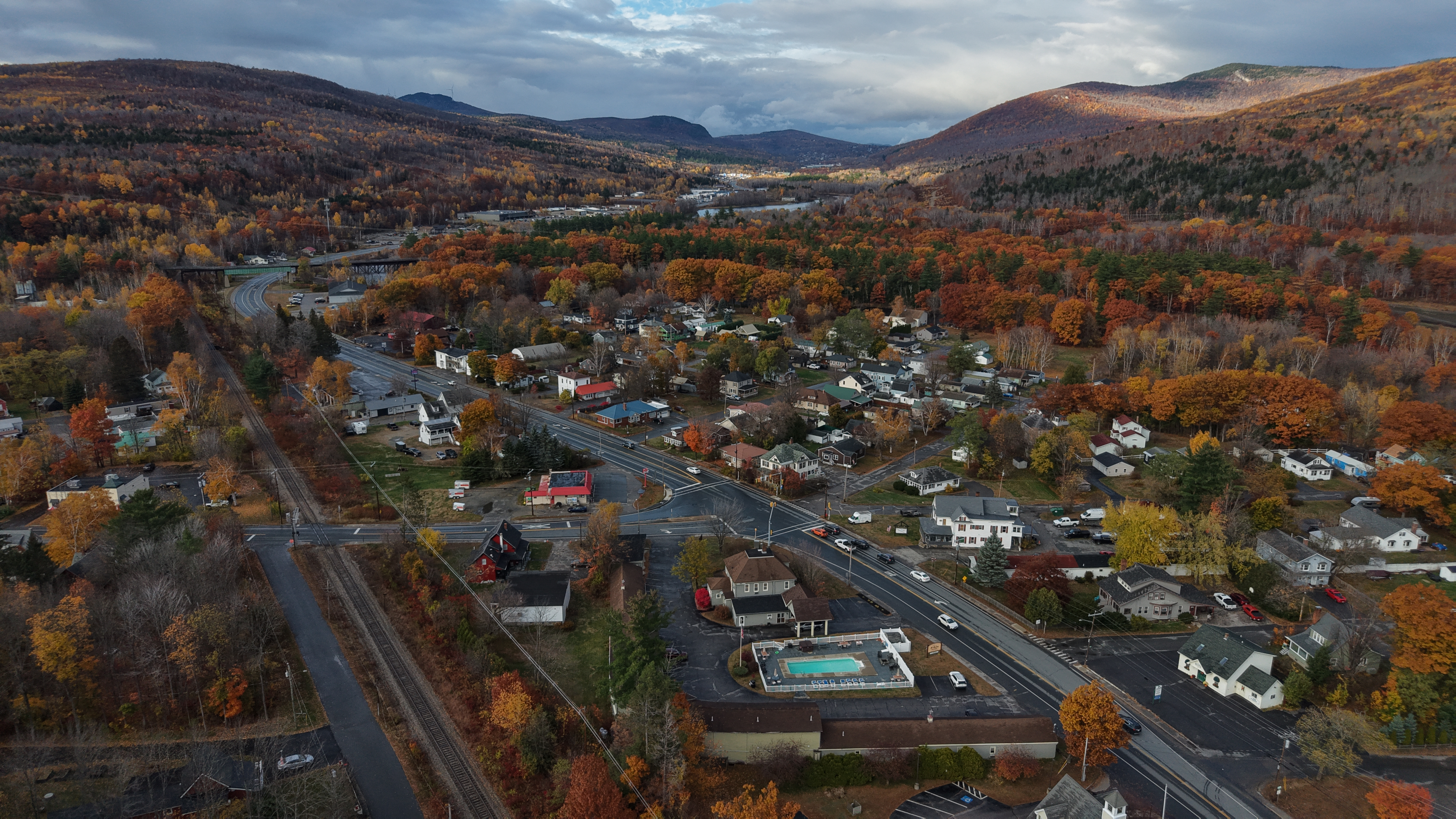
Gorham Upper Village, NH, from the south

According to the United States Census Bureau, the town has a total area of 32.3 square miles (83.7 km^{2}), of which 31.8 square miles (82.4 km^{2}) are land and 0.50 square miles (1.3 km^{2}) are water, comprising 1.50% of the town.

Gorham is drained by the Androscoggin River and its tributaries, the Peabody and Moose rivers, and the smaller Moose Brook. Gorham lies fully within the Androscoggin River watershed.

Gorham is bordered to the north by Berlin, northeast by Success, east by Shelburne, west by Randolph, southwest by Thompson and Meserve's Purchase, south by Martin's Location, and southeast by Bean's Purchase.

The highest point in Gorham is along its western border, on a spur of Mount Madison, where the elevation reaches 3,030 feet (920 m) above sea level. While Gorham itself is surrounded by larger mountains, a small prominent peak within the town is 2,400-foot (730 m) high Pine Mountain.

New Hampshire Route 16 and U.S. Route 2 run directly through the center of Gorham. Route 16 leads south through Pinkham Notch and Jackson to North Conway, and north into the city of Berlin. Route 2 leads east through Shelburne into Maine and west through Randolph and Jefferson to Lancaster.

=== Rivers ===
- Androscoggin River
- Peabody River
- Moose River

=== Adjacent municipalities ===
- Berlin (north)
- Success (northeast)
- Shelburne (east)
- Purchase (southeast)
- Martin's Location (south)
- Thompson and Meserve's Purchase (southwest)
- Low and Burbank's Grant (southwest)
- Randolph (west)

== Demographics ==
Historical population
Census	Pop.	Note	%±
1840	156		—
1850	224		43.6%
1860	907		304.9%
1870	1,167		28.7%
1880	1,383		18.5%
1890	1,710		23.6%
1900	1,797		5.1%
1910	2,155		19.9%
1920	2,734		26.9%
1930	2,763		1.1%
1940	2,597		−6.0%
1950	2,639		1.6%
1960	3,039		15.2%
1970	2,998		−1.3%
1980	3,322		10.8%
1990	3,173		−4.5%
2000	2,895		−8.8%
2010	2,848		−1.6%
2020	2,698		−5.3%
U.S. Decennial Census

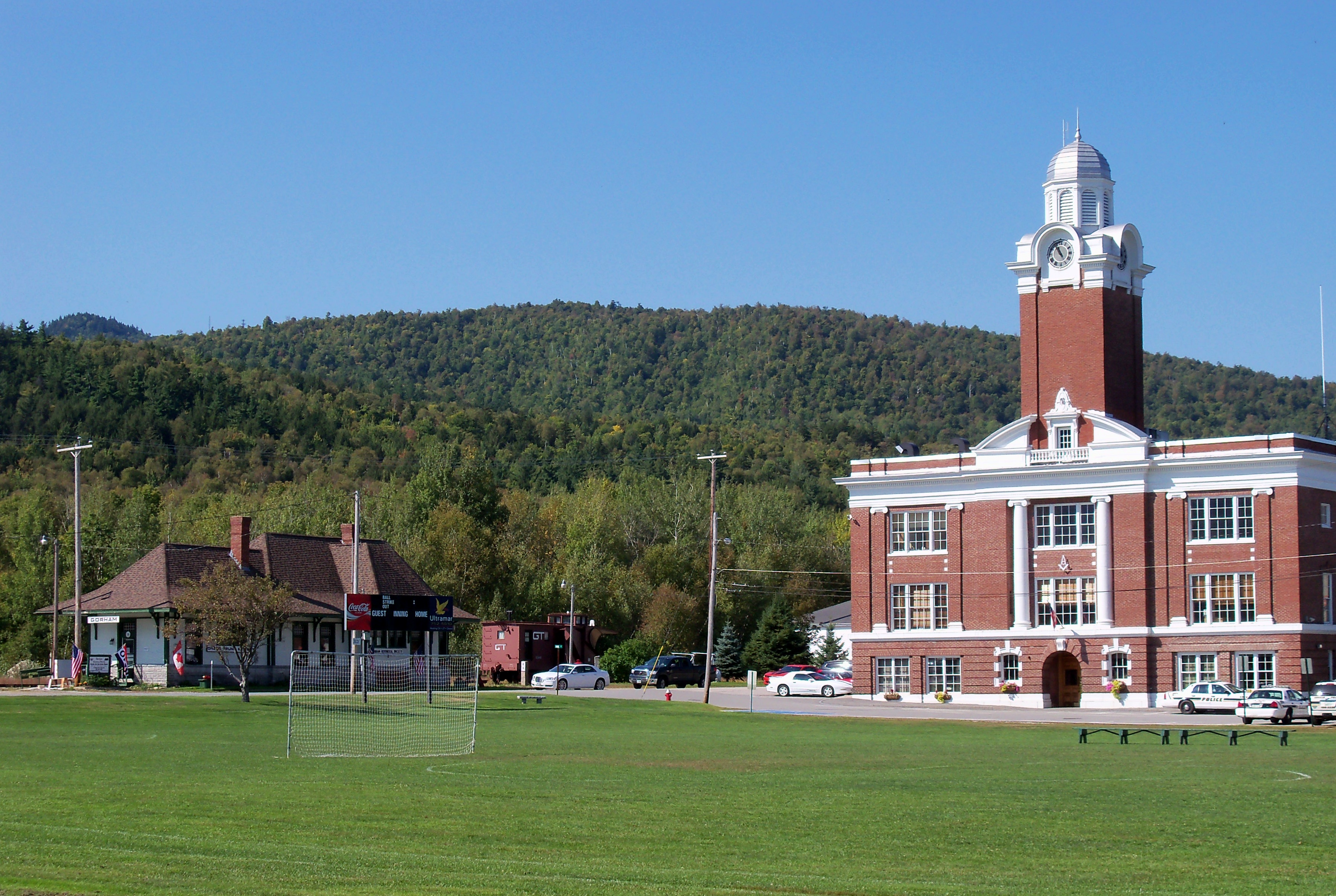
Gorham Common, with the restored train depot on the left and Gorham Town Hall on the right

As of the census of 2010, there were 2,848 people, 1,301 households, and 802 families residing in the town. There were 1,487 housing units, of which 186, or 12.5%, were vacant. The racial makeup of the town was 97.0% white, 0.1% African American, 0.2% Native American, 1.1% Asian, 0.0% Native Hawaiian or Pacific Islander, 0.04% some other race, and 1.5% from two or more races. 0.9% of the population were Hispanic or Latino of any race.

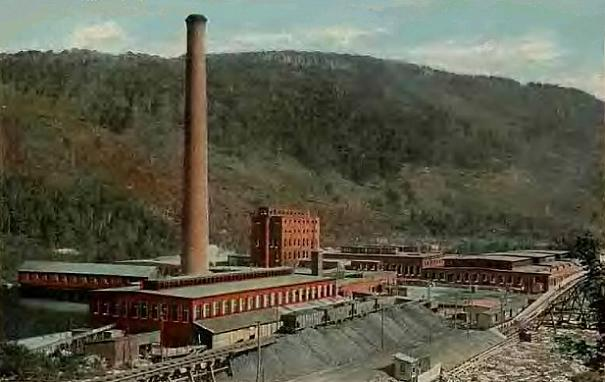
Cascade Mill c. 1920

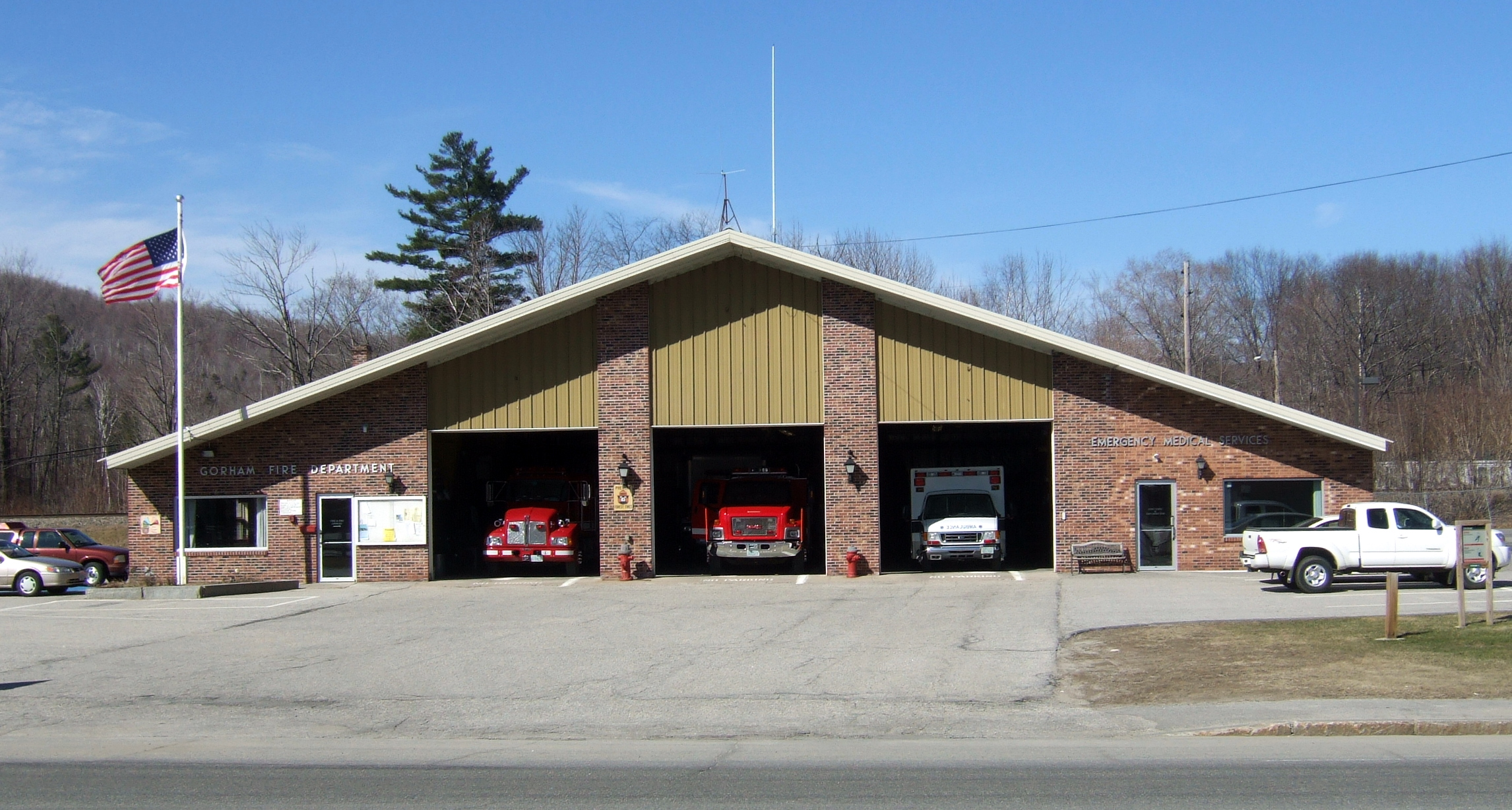
Gorham Fire Department, 2009

Of the 1,301 households, 25.6% had children under the age of 18 living with them, 49.7% were headed by married couples living together, 8.2% had a female householder with no husband present, and 38.4% were non-families. 31.9% of all households were made up of individuals, and 15.6% were someone living alone who was 65 years of age or older. The average household size was 2.19, and the average family size was 2.73. In the town, 19.4% of the population were under the age of 18, 5.4% were from 18 to 24, 21.8% from 25 to 44, 34.7% from 45 to 64, and 18.8% were 65 years of age or older. The median age was 47.0 years. For every 100 females, there were 100.1 males. For every 100 females age 18 and over, there were 95.0 males.

For the period 2011–2015, the estimated median annual income for a household was $51,190, and the median income for a family was $63,071. Male full-time workers had a median income of $45,432 versus $33,542 for females. The per capita income for the town was $28,508. 7.5% of the population and 4.5% of families were below the poverty line. 12.0% of the population under the age of 18 and 9.0% of those 65 or older were living in poverty.

=== Historical demographics ===
Howard Mansfield of The Washington Post wrote that in the 1920s, "When you spoke of prejudice in all-white Gorham, it was between the Protestants and the Catholic French Canadians."

== Notable people ==
- William Hatch, New Hampshire politician
- Albert C. Johnston (?–1988), doctor

== Education ==
- Gorham High School

== Sites of interest ==
- Gorham Historical Society and Railroad Museum
- Moose Brook State Park
