= Martin's Location, New Hampshire =

Township in Coos County, New Hampshire, United States

- Township
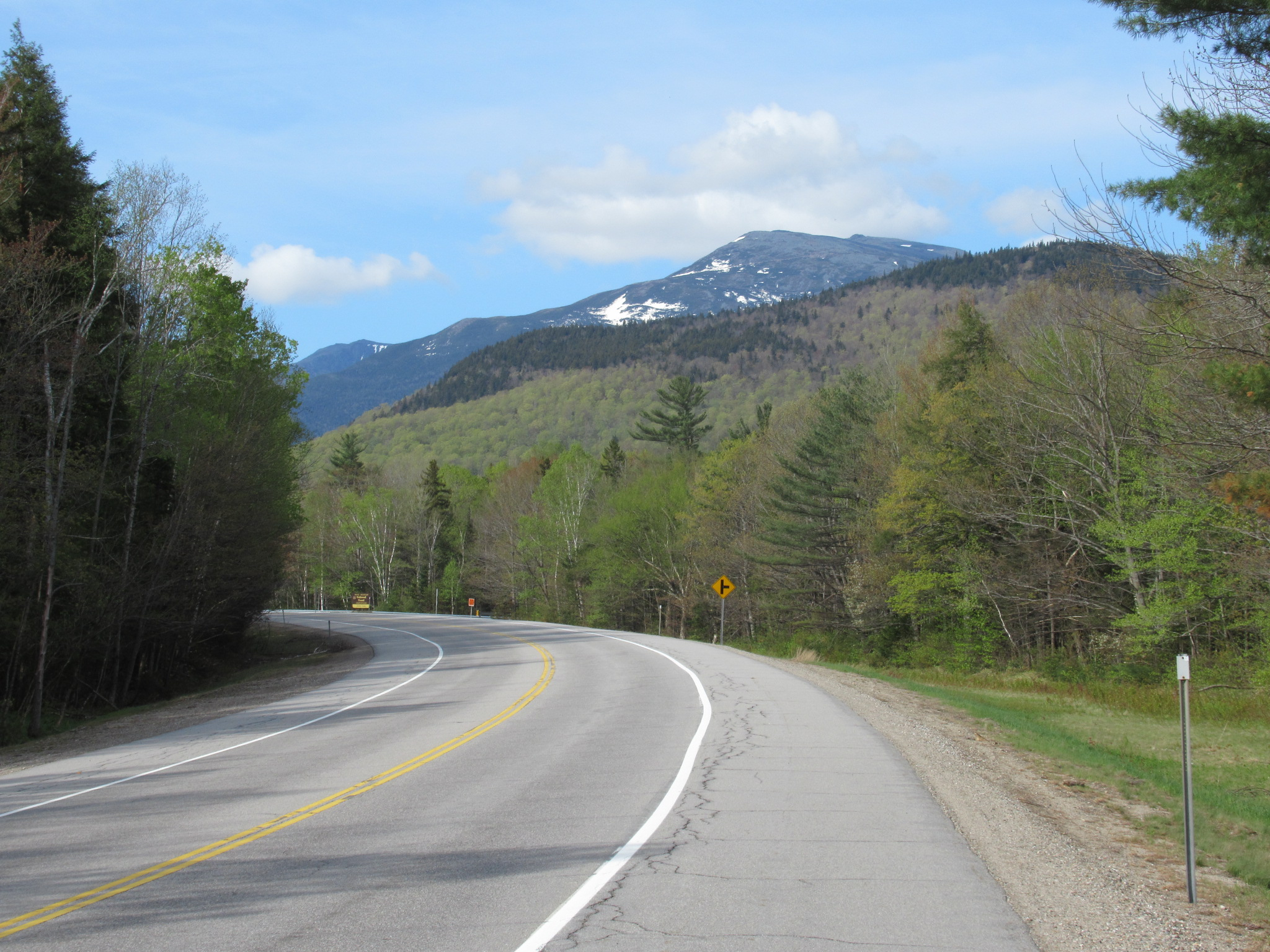
- New Hampshire Route 16 in Martin's Location, May 2019. Mount Washington rises to the south, outside the township.

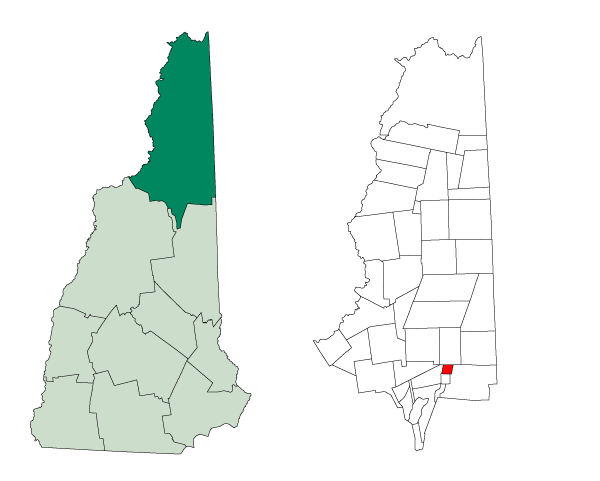
- Location in Coös County, New Hampshire
- Coordinates: 44°19′43″N 71°12′50″W
- Country: United States
- State: New Hampshire
- County: Coös

Area
  - Total: 3.76 sq mi (9.73 km^{2})
  - Land: 3.73 sq mi (9.65 km^{2})
  - Water: 0.031 sq mi (0.08 km^{2}) 0.80%
- Elevation: 1,200 ft (370 m)

Population (2020)
  - Total: 2
  - Density: 0.52/sq mi (0.2/km^{2})
- Time zone: UTC-5 (Eastern)
  - Summer (DST): UTC-4 (Eastern)
- Area code: 603
- FIPS code: 33-007-46020
- GNIS feature ID: 872260

Martin's Location is a township in Coös County, New Hampshire, United States. As of the 2020 census, two people were reported as living in the location. It lies entirely within the White Mountain National Forest, and is the site of the Dolly Copp Campground.

In New Hampshire, locations, grants, townships (which are different from towns), and purchases are unincorporated portions of a county which are not part of any town and have limited self-government (if any, as many are uninhabited).

== Geography ==
The location straddles the Peabody River and New Hampshire Route 16 due east of Mount Madison, north of Green's Grant and bounded to the north by Gorham.

According to the United States Census Bureau, the location has a total area of 3.7 square miles (9.7 km^{2}), of which 0.03 square miles (0.08 km^{2}), or 0.80%, are water. Via the north-flowing Peabody River, the location is part of the Androscoggin River watershed. The highest point is the southeastern corner of the location, at 2,600 feet (790 m) above sea level.

=== Adjacent municipalities ===
- Gorham (north)
- Bean's Purchase (east)
- Green's Grant (south)
- Thompson and Meserve's Purchase (west)

== Demographics ==
Historical population
Census	Pop.	Note	%±
1860	19		—
1870	17		−10.5%
1880	33		94.1%
1890	5		−84.8%
1910	3		—
1920	4		33.3%
1960	2		—
1970	0		−100.0%
1980	0		—
1990	0		—
2000	0		—
2010	0		—
2020	2		—
U.S. Decennial Census

As of the 2020 census, there were two people living in the township.
