= Gorham (CDP), New Hampshire =

Census-designated place in New Hampshire, United States

Gorham, New Hampshire
- Census-designated place
- Gorham, New Hampshire, from the west

- Location within New Hampshire Location within the United States
- Coordinates: 44°23′16″N 71°10′23″W
- Country: United States
- State: New Hampshire
- County: Coos
- Town: Gorham

Area
  - Total: 1.77 sq mi (4.58 km^{2})
  - Land: 1.68 sq mi (4.36 km^{2})
  - Water: 0.085 sq mi (0.22 km^{2})
- Elevation: 804 ft (245 m)

Population (2020)
  - Total: 1,851
  - Density: 1,099.6/sq mi (424.56/km^{2})
- Time zone: UTC-5 (Eastern (EST))
  - Summer (DST): UTC-4 (EDT)
- ZIP code: 03581
- Area code: 603
- FIPS code: 33-30180
- GNIS feature ID: 2378065

Gorham is a census-designated place (CDP) and the main village in the town of Gorham, New Hampshire, United States. The population of the CDP was 1,851 at the 2020 census, out of 2,698 people in the entire town of Gorham.

== Geography ==
The CDP is in the central part of the town of Gorham, on the south side of the Androscoggin River. The CDP extends from Moose Brook State Park in the west to the Shelburne town line in the east. The northern border, from west to east, includes Jimtown Road, Moose Brook, and the Androscoggin River, while the southern border follows a power line and a pipeline. U.S. Route 2 runs through the center of Gorham as its Main Street, leading east 22 miles (35 km) to Bethel, Maine, and west 24 miles (39 km) to Lancaster. New Hampshire Route 16 joins US 2 through the center of Gorham but leads north 6 miles (10 km) to Berlin and south over Pinkham Notch 27 miles (43 km) to North Conway.

According to the U.S. Census Bureau, the Gorham CDP has a total area of 1.8 square miles (4.6 km^{2}), of which 1.7 square miles (4.4 km^{2}) are land and 0.1 square miles (0.2 km^{2}), or 4.81%, are water.

== Demographics ==
Historical population
Census	Pop.	Note	%±
1950	1,739		—
1960	1,945		11.8%
1970	2,020		3.9%
1980	2,180		7.9%
1990	1,910		−12.4%
2000	1,773		−7.2%
2010	1,600		−9.8%
2020	1,851		15.7%
U.S. Decennial Census

As of the census of 2010, there were 1,600 people, 767 households, and 440 families residing in the CDP. There were 852 housing units, of which 85, or 10.0%, were vacant. The racial makeup of the town was 96.8% white, 0.0% African American, 0.2% Native American, 1.6% Asian, 0.0% Pacific Islander, 0.1% some other race, and 1.4% from two or more races. 0.8% of the population were Hispanic or Latino of any race.

Of the 767 households in the CDP, 23.3% had children under the age of 18 living with them, 43.9% were headed by married couples living together, 10.0% had a female householder with no husband present, and 42.6% were non-families. 35.7% of all households were made up of individuals, and 15.2% were someone living alone who was 65 years of age or older. The average household size was 2.09, and the average family size was 2.68.

18.0% of people in the CDP were under the age of 18, 6.1% were from age 18 to 24, 22.0% were from 25 to 44, 35.0% were from 45 to 64, and 18.9% were 65 years of age or older. The median age was 47.4 years. For every 100 females, there were 101.3 males. For every 100 females age 18 and over, there were 97.6 males.

For the period 2011–15, the estimated median annual income for a household was $53,077, and the median income for a family was $58,625. Male full-time workers had a median income of $42,303 versus $31,667 for females. The per capita income for the CDP was $28,249. 7.4% of the population and 3.7% of families were below the poverty line, along with 14.7% of people under the age of 18 and 0.0% of people 65 or older.
