= Brown Company =

American pulp and papermaking company

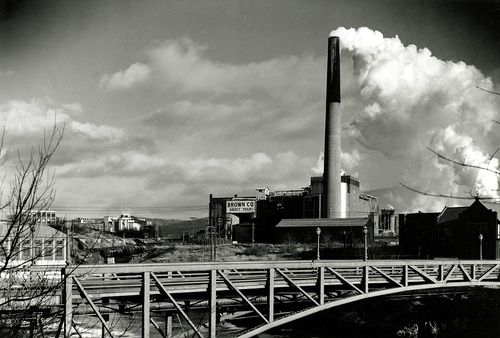
- Industry: Pulp and paper
- Founded: 1852; 174 years ago
- Founder: John B. Brown, Josiah S. Little, Nathan Winslow, and Hezekiah Winslow
- Headquarters: Berlin, U.S.
- Key people: W. W. Brown
- Products: Paper products, Bermico, Kream Krisp

The Brown Company, known as the Brown Corporation in Canada, was a pulp and papermaking company based in Berlin, New Hampshire, United States. It stopped trading during the 1980s.

== History ==
=== H. Winslow & Company ===
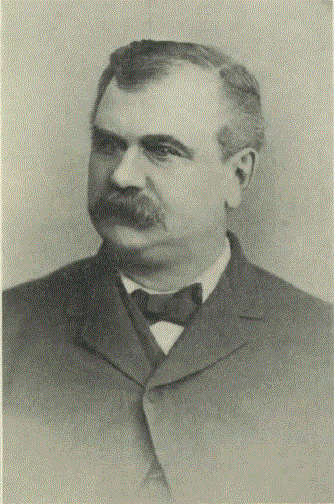
Lewis T. Brown

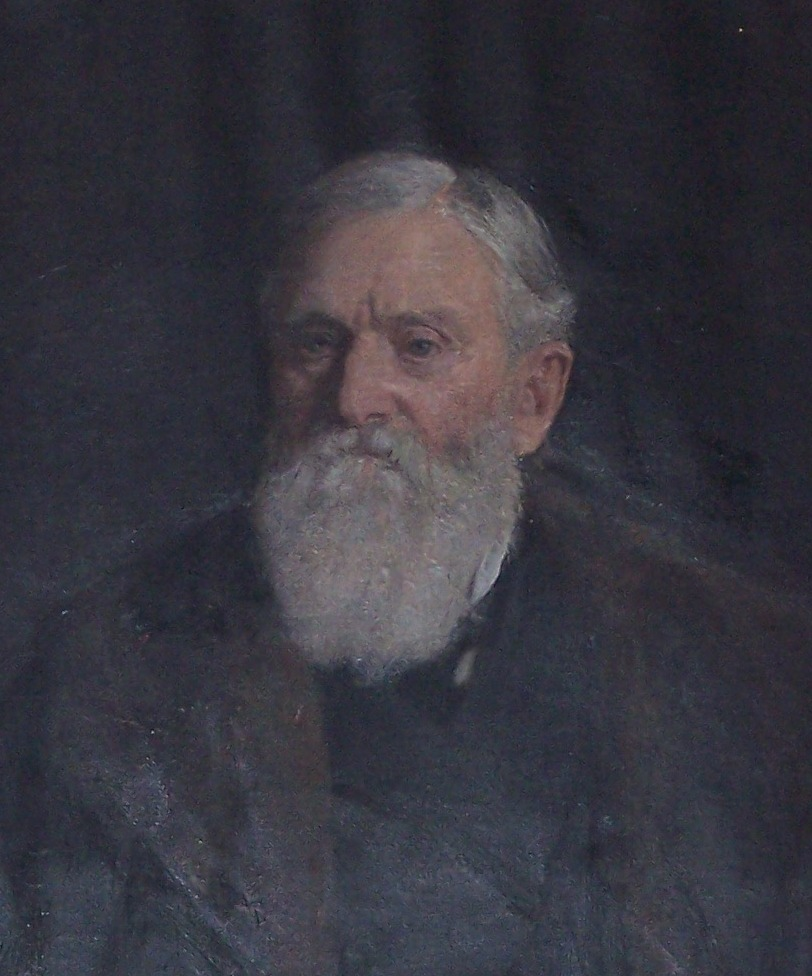
William Wentworth Brown

In 1852, a group of Portland, Maine, businessmen—John B. Brown, Josiah S. Little, Nathan Winslow, and Hezekiah Winslow—purchased and built a large sawmill on the property known as the "Thomas Green Privilege" at the head of Berlin Falls in Berlin, New Hampshire. In 1854, they expanded their operations by constructing the H. Winslow & Company branch railway to the Grand Trunk Railway, and, in 1858, they built a dam and a gristmill.

=== Berlin Mills Company ===
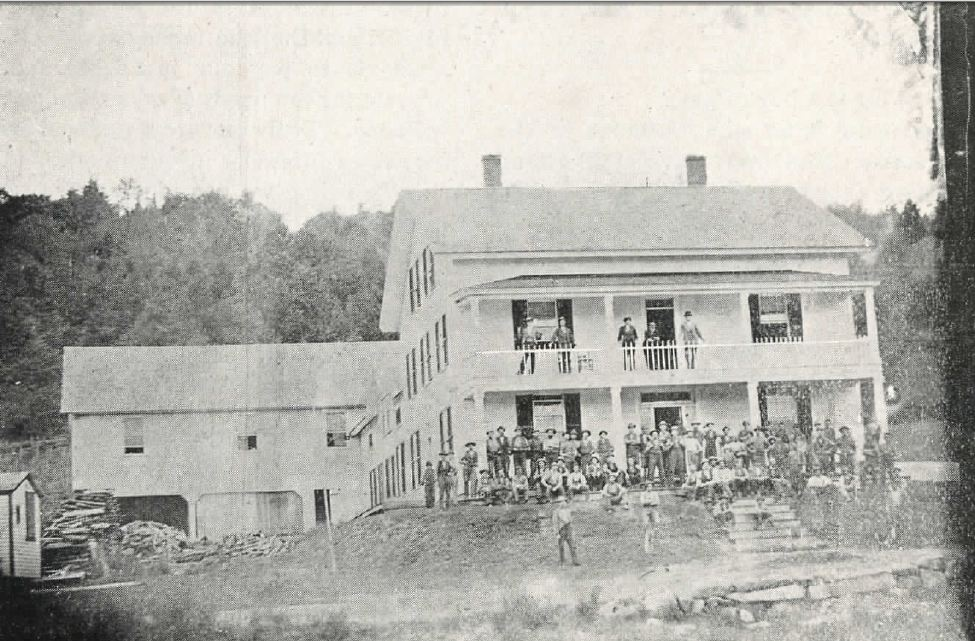
Berlin Mills Company boarding house, c. 1870

By 1866, Josiah Little had died, and the Winslows had sold their interests in the H. Winslow & Company. A new partnership was formed and a new name chosen, the Berlin Mills Company. In 1868, William Wentworth Brown and Lewis T. Brown purchased a controlling interest in the company and remodeled their sawmill, making it even larger than before. W. W. Brown later purchased the stock owned by Lewis T. Brown in the 1880s, acquiring complete control of the company.

=== Brown Company ===
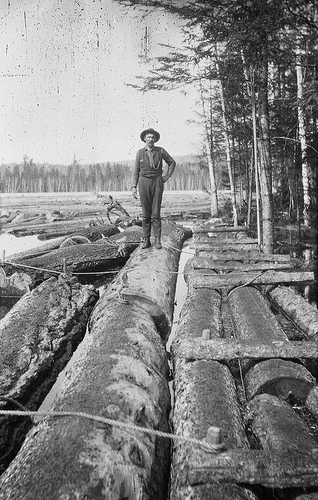
Log driver working for the Brown Company in New Hampshire

The company changed its name again in 1917 during World War I to the Brown Company. The Brown family owned land that spanned from Canada to Florida, which they used for logging. In the 1940s the Brown Company went through bankruptcy and never recovered. In 1954, European business began to purchase large amounts of stock in the company, therefore the Brown Company began to buy European businesses in England, Wales, and Italy. The company was closed after its parent company Gulf and Western Industries (which had acquired the Brown Company in the late 1960s) sold it in 1980 to the James River Corporation. The paper mills stayed in Berlin under various companies until closing in 2006. The other plant in Gorham is now operated under the name of Gorham Paper and Tissue, which is managed by Patriarch Partners.

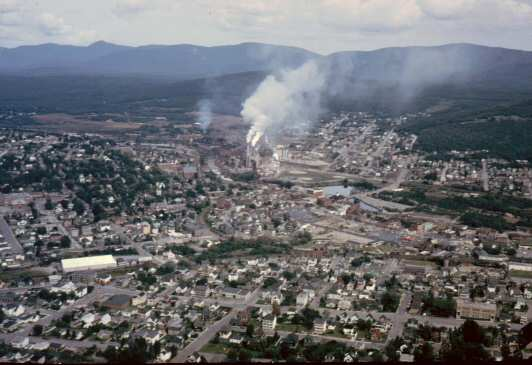
City panorama from Mt. Forest, 1970

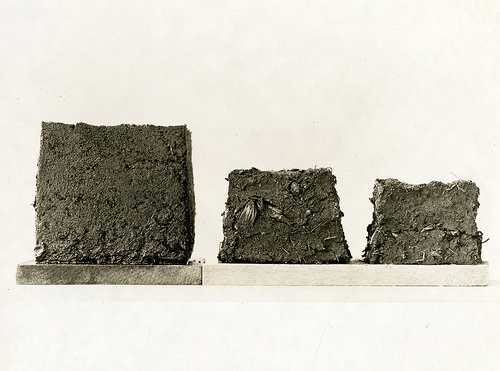
Dirt samples from the Everglades, Florida

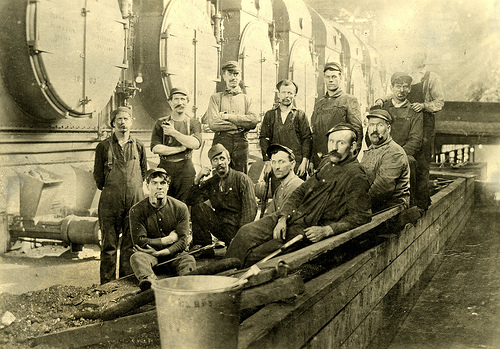
Boiler crew in the Cascade Mill

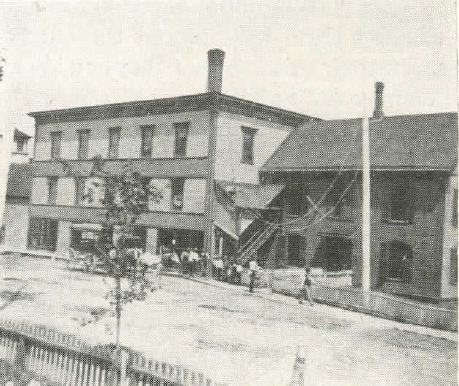
The Brown Company Store

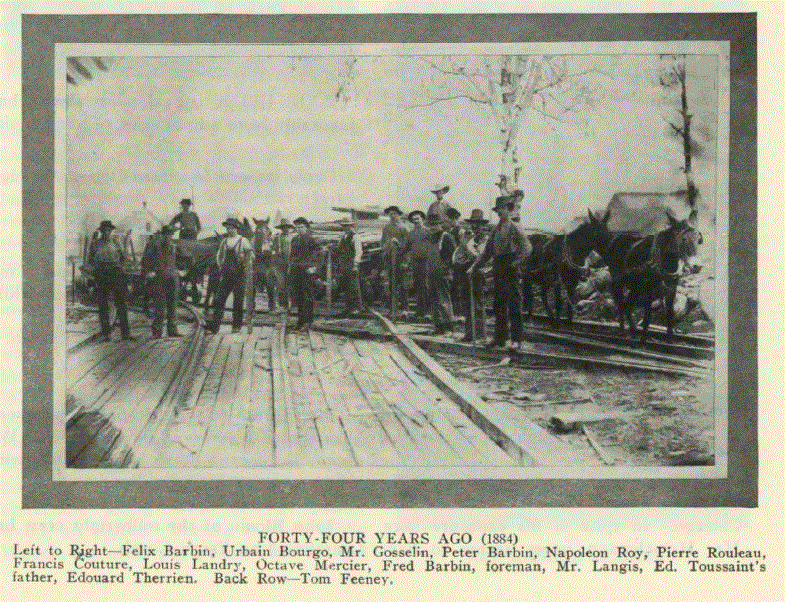
Workers of the Berlin Mills Company Store

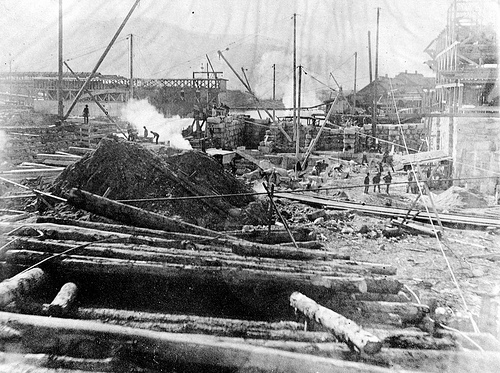
Construction of the Cascade Mill, c. 1904

== Beyond Brown Paper ==
In the 1970s, Bill Taylor, associate professor of history at Plymouth State University, arranged for 11,000 photographs taken by the Brown Company photographers from 1870 to 1965 to be transferred to the said university for archival usage. In 2006, images were scanned, and the Beyond Brown Paper website was formed. In September 2012, a partnership between Historic New England, the Berlin and Coos County Historical Society, Timberlane Regional High School, and Plymouth State University created an award-winning documentary called At the River's Edge: An Oral History of Berlin, New Hampshire.

== Scientific research ==
During the early 1900s, the Brown Company created a new department known as "research and development" and constructed a building for this to take place. In 1954, over 150 projects were kept recorded in their books. The objective for this new department was to "demonstrate that the future of the Brown Company didn't lie in the achievements of the past, but in the development of products and process that were yet to come."

Some products that were the result of the R&D department were Bermico piping, cellulose floc, and Nibroc towels. In January 1927, work began in the Everglades in Florida by Dr. R. V. Allison to work on soil problems and to reclaim lands that were taken by two railroads. At its peak, the Brown Company's R&D department held over 100 scientists and eventually earned 600 U.S. patents.

== Inventions and products ==
Early paper towels

The following items were created and produced by the Brown Company:

- Onco leather – artificial leather used mostly for shoes
- Bermico, a type of pipe that was produced in the 1920s–1970s
- Cellulose floc, developed by the Brown Company
- Farrand Rapid Rule, created by Hiram A. Farrand Inc., with the help of the Brown Co, but later sold to Stanley Works
- Kream Krisp, a substance like Crisco, which led to the lawsuit known as Procter and Gamble vs. the Brown Company
- Powder containers used for weapons during World War II
- Raw Peanut Oil – cooking oil in which the oil had been extracted from peanuts
- Solka Pulp – developed into Solka Floc, which was made into a variety of different substances
- Nibroc Paper Towels, developed by William E. Corbin
- Peanut Flakes – A type of breakfast cereal
- White Mountain Caustic Soda – caustic soda recovered from the chlorine-making process

== See also ==
- William Robinson Brown
