= Crescent Range =

Mountain range in New Hampshire, United States

Coordinates: 44°24′15″N 71°17′39″W

The Crescent Range, sometimes referred to as the Randolph Mountains, is located in the White Mountains of New Hampshire in the United States. The highest peak in the range is Black Crescent Mountain, with an elevation of 3,264 feet (995 m).

== Summits ==
(from north to south)

- Black Crescent Mountain, 3,264 feet (995 m)
- Mount Crescent, 3,251 feet (991 m)
- Mount Randolph, 3,080 feet (940 m)
- Boy Mountain, 2,217 feet (676 m)

== See also ==
- White Mountains (New Hampshire)
- New England/Acadian forests
