= Moose River (New Hampshire) =

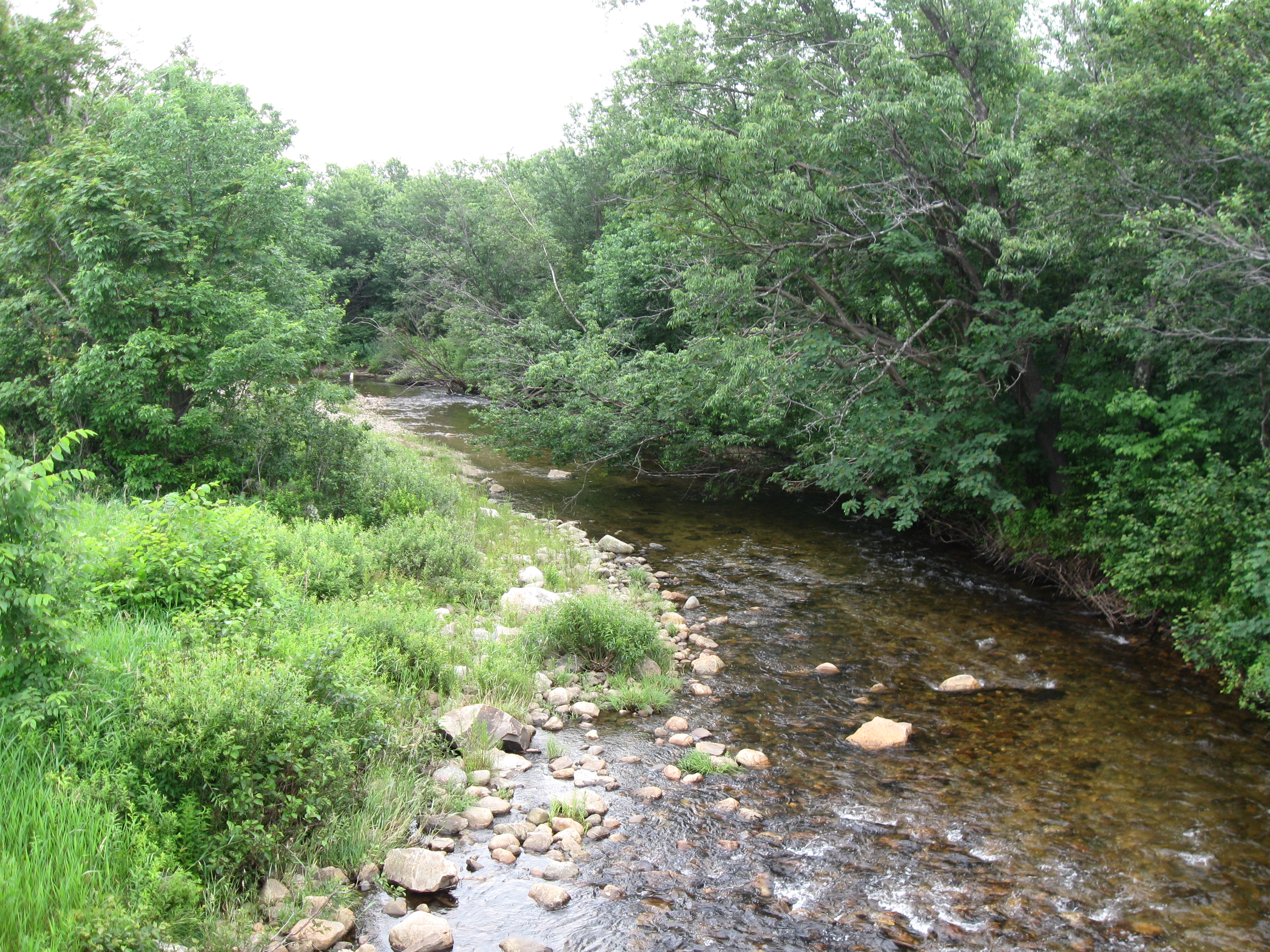
- The Moose River at U.S. Route 2 near Pinkham B Road in Randolph, New Hampshire

- Location within New Hampshire Location within the United States

Location
- Country: United States
- State: New Hampshire
- County: Coos
- Towns: Randolph, Gorham

Physical characteristics
- Source: Mount Adams
  - location: Randolph
  - coordinates: 44°20′46″N 71°19′12″W
  - elevation: 2,520 ft (768 m)
- Mouth: Androscoggin River
  - location: Gorham
  - coordinates: 44°23′42″N 71°11′15″W
  - elevation: 775 ft (236 m)
- Length: 11.7 mi (18.8 km)

Basin features
- Tributaries
  - left: Carlton Brook
  - right: Cold Brook, Snyder Brook, Bumpus Brook, Townline Brook

The Moose River is an 11.7-mile-long (18.8 km) stream in northern New Hampshire in the United States. It is a tributary of the Androscoggin River, which flows south and east into Maine, joining the Kennebec River near the Atlantic Ocean.

The Moose River rises in the town of Randolph, New Hampshire, on the northern slopes of Mount Adams. The river quickly enters the wide valley between the Presidential Range to the south and the Crescent Mountain Range to the north and turns east to flow to the Androscoggin River in Gorham. An inactive railroad line owned by the state of New Hampshire, now known as the Presidential Rail Trail, parallels the Moose River for most of the river's length.

== See also ==
- List of rivers of New Hampshire
