= Canadian National class N-4 2-8-0 =

Canadian National class N-4
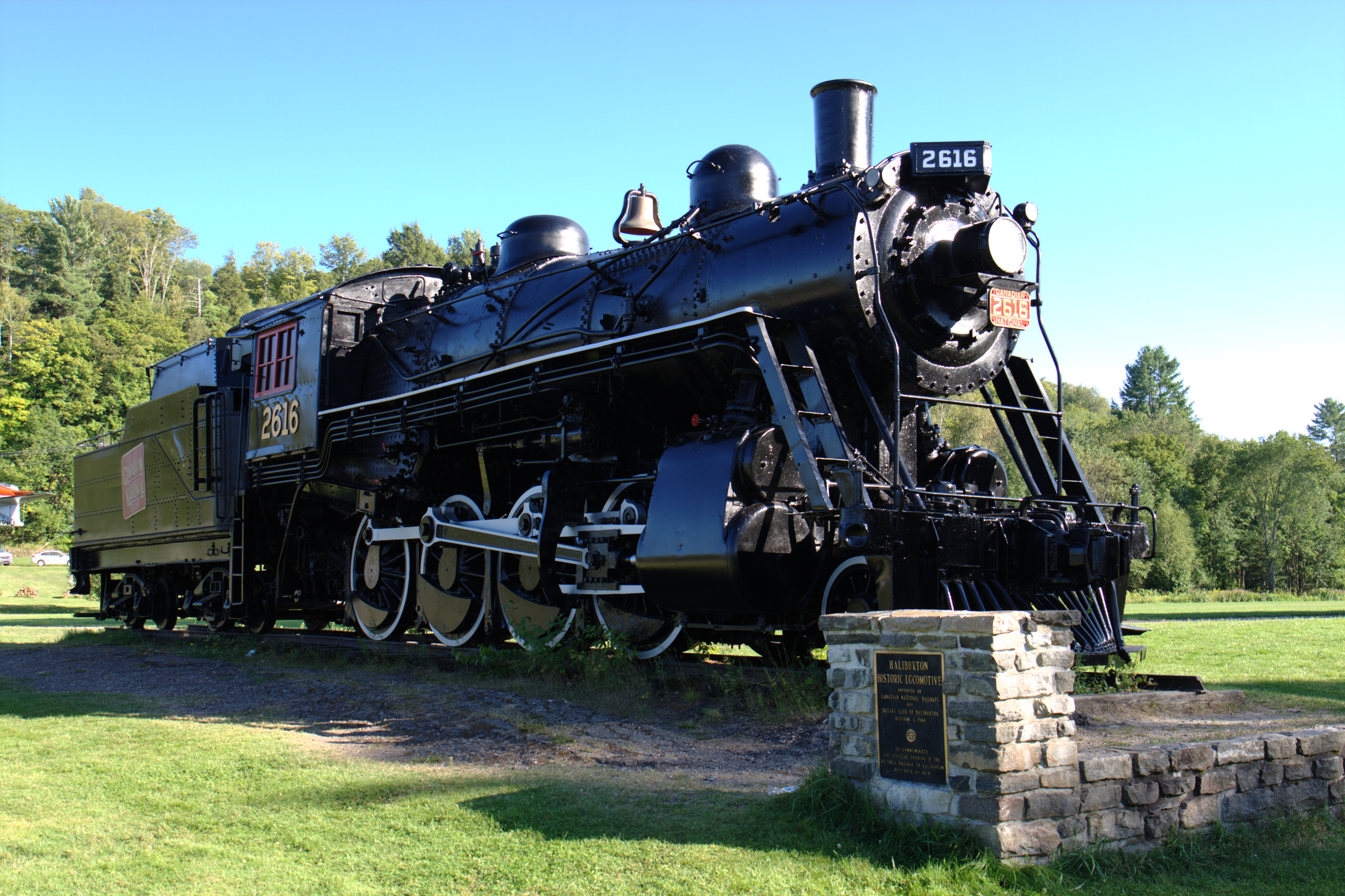
- Canadian National Railways 2616 on display at Head Lake, Haliburton, Ontario
Type and origin
- Power type: Steam
- Builder: Montreal Locomotive Works; American Locomotive Company
- Build date: August 1906 – November 1911
- Total produced: 232
Specifications
- Configuration
  - Whyte: 2-8-0
  - UIC: New: 1′D n2v and 1′D h2v; Rebuilt: 1′D h2
- Gauge: 4 ft 8 1/2 in (1,435 mm)
- Driver dia.: 63 in (1,600 mm)
- Fuel type: Coal
- Boiler pressure: 180 lbf/in^{2} (1.24 MPa)
- Cylinders: Two, outside
- Cylinder size: Compound HP: 22 1/2 in × 32 in (572 mm × 813 mm); Compound LP: 35 in × 32 in (889 mm × 813 mm); Simple: 23 in × 32 in (584 mm × 813 mm)
- Valve gear: Stephenson, Walschaerts, or Young
Performance figures
- Tractive effort: 41,000 lbf (182.4 kN)
Career
- Operators: Grand Trunk Railway; Canadian National Railway
- Class: GT: D2 through D7, D9 and D11; CN: N-4-a through N-4-f
- Retired: 1952–1960
- Preserved: Three
- Scrapped: 1955-1960
- Disposition: Three preserved, remainder scrapped

Canadian National class N-4 was a class of 2-8-0 steam locomotives. These locomotives were built for the Grand Trunk Railway (GT) from 1906 until GT began purchasing class M freight locomotives in 1913. Initially classed D2 by the Grand Trunk, they were built as Richmond compound locomotives with 210 lbf/in^{2} (1.4 MPa) boilers feeding 22 1/2 inches (572 mm) and 35 inches (889 mm) by 32 inches (813 mm) cylinders.

The Grand Trunk started to rebuild and reclassify them; superheated compounds became class D3; those rebuilt with 23-by-32-inch (580 mm × 810 mm) simple expansion cylinders and Stephenson valve gear became classes D4, D5 and D6. The D4 was extinct by the 1923 takeover of the Grand Trunk by Canadian National Railway; CN reclassified the others as N-4-a and N-4-b respectively. Some locomotives received Walschaerts valve gear and were classified D7 (N-4-d and N-4-e) and D9 (N-4-c); two received Young valve gear and were classified D11 (N-4-f). All simpled locomotives had their boiler pressure reduced to 180 lbf/in^{2} (1.241 MPa)

Both GT and CN took some of these rebuilding efforts out of their original numerical sequence. CN numbered class N-4-a locomotives from 2525 through 2660 and numbered the alternative rebuilding classes from 2661 through 2686. The rebuilt simplified locomotives remained in freight service until the final replacement of steam with diesel locomotives.

Builder	Works numbers	Dates	GT numbers	CN numbers	Notes
MLW	39548–39562	1906	651–665	2515–2529	Retired 1952
MLW	40583–40622	1906	666–705	2530–2543, 2661, 2544–2551, 2662, 2552–2566, 2663	Retired 1953-1954
ALCO	42046–42060	1907	706–720	2669, 2567–2570, 2670–2671, 2571–2573, 2664, 2672, 2574–2576	built at ALCO's Schenectady Works . Retired 1954-1955
MLW	42331–42345	1907	721–735	2577-2784, 2685, 2585–2590	Retired 1955-1956
MLW	43150–43164	1907	736–750	2591–2605	Retired 1956-1957
ALCO	43540–43554	1907	751–765	2606, 2673, 2607–2608, 2674, 2609–2610, 2675, 2611–2612, 2676, 2613, 2665, 2614–2615	built at ALCO's Schenectady Works . Retired 1957-1958
MLW	45163–45182	1908	631–650	2627–2646	Retired 1958-1959
MLW	46880-46894	1910	616–630	2647–2657, 2686, 2658–2660	Retired 1959
ALCO	49663–49674	1911	766–777	2677, 2616–2623, 2678, 2624–2625	built at ALCO's Brooks Works . Retired 1959-1960
ALCO	50472–50481	1911	779–787	2679, 2666, 2626, 2680–2682, 2667, 2683, 2668, 2684	built at ALCO's Schenectady Works . Retired 1960

Three N-4-a class locomotives have been preserved:

- Number 2534 (ex-GT 640, MLW 40587 of 1906) was initially preserved in Zwick Island Park, Belleville, Ontario, but moved to Memory Junction Railway Museum in Brighton, Ontario in 1997;
- Number 2601 (ex-GT 746, MLW 43160 of 1907) in the Canadian Railway Historical Association Museum at Delson, Quebec; and
- Number 2616 (ex-GT 767, Alco-Brooks 49664 of 1911) by the Kiwanis in Haliburton, Ontario.
