= Cascade, New Hampshire =

Unincorporated community in New Hampshire, United States

- Unincorporated community
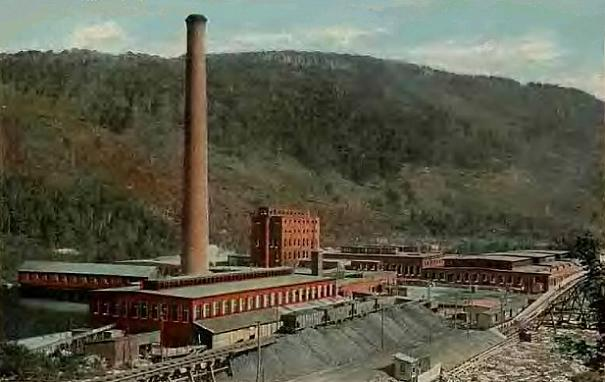
- Cascade Mill c. 1920

- Location within New Hampshire Location within the United States
- Coordinates: 44°26′58″N 71°11′33″W
- Country: United States
- State: New Hampshire
- County: Coos
- City: Berlin
- Town: Gorham
- Elevation: 1,047 ft (319 m)
- Time zone: UTC-5 (Eastern (EST))
  - Summer (DST): UTC-4 (EDT)
- Area code: 603
- GNIS feature ID: 871636

Cascade is an unincorporated community within the city of Berlin and the town of Gorham, New Hampshire, United States. The village gets its name from a nearby alpine waterfall, which is visible in the hills to the east. The village straddles New Hampshire Route 16, the main road into Berlin from the south. On the eastern side of the road, there is a paper finishing mill located on flatlands by the Androscoggin River known as "Cascade Flats". On the western side there is a hill known as "Cascade Hill".

== History ==
In the mid-1800s, travelers were attracted by the beauty of the Alpine Cascades. At that time, the cascades were reached by a small wire suspension bridge and a little trail through a grove. In 1904, construction of the Cascade Mill began by the Brown Company. Italian and Polish immigrants help build the mill and later settled around it. Unfinished paper products from the Berlin mill were brought to this mill by two GE 70-ton locomotives, and from there the paper processes were finished. The mill is now Gorham Paper and Tissue, which is managed by Patriarch Partners.

In 1988, archaeological digs discovered four prehistoric sites on the east side of the Androscoggin River in the area of Pulsifer Rips, a two-mile-long stretch of river below Cascade Dam. The sites include remains of a village and stone tool workshops.

== Image gallery ==
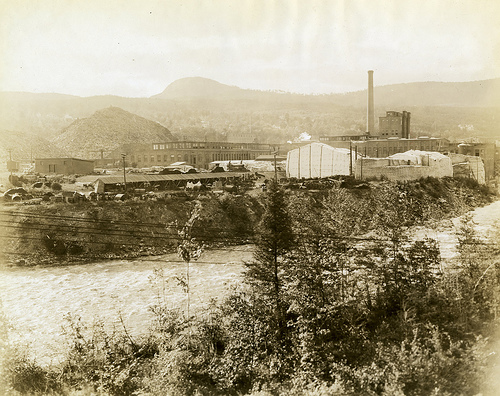
Cascade Mill, 1914

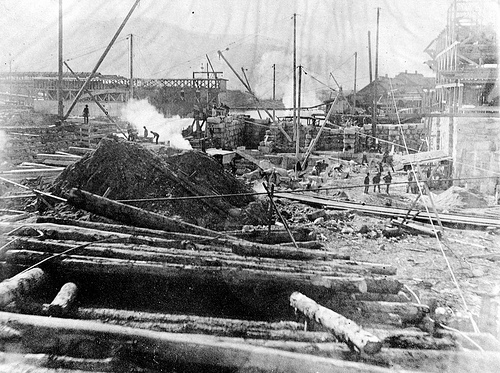
Construction of the Cascade Mill, 1904
