= Black Crescent Mountain =

Mountain in Randolph, New Hampshire

Highest point
- Elevation: 3,264 ft (995 m)
- Prominence: 1,059 ft (323 m)
- Coordinates: 44°26′21″N 71°16′13″W

Geography
- Location: Coos County, New Hampshire
- Parent range: Crescent Range
- Topo map: USGS Pliny Range

Black Crescent Mountain is a mountain in the Crescent Range of the White Mountains, 4.4 miles (7.1 km) north of Randolph and 4.7 miles (7.6 km) southwest of Berlin in New Hampshire. The summit is on the eastern boundary of the White Mountain National Forest.
