= Randolph, New Hampshire =

- Town
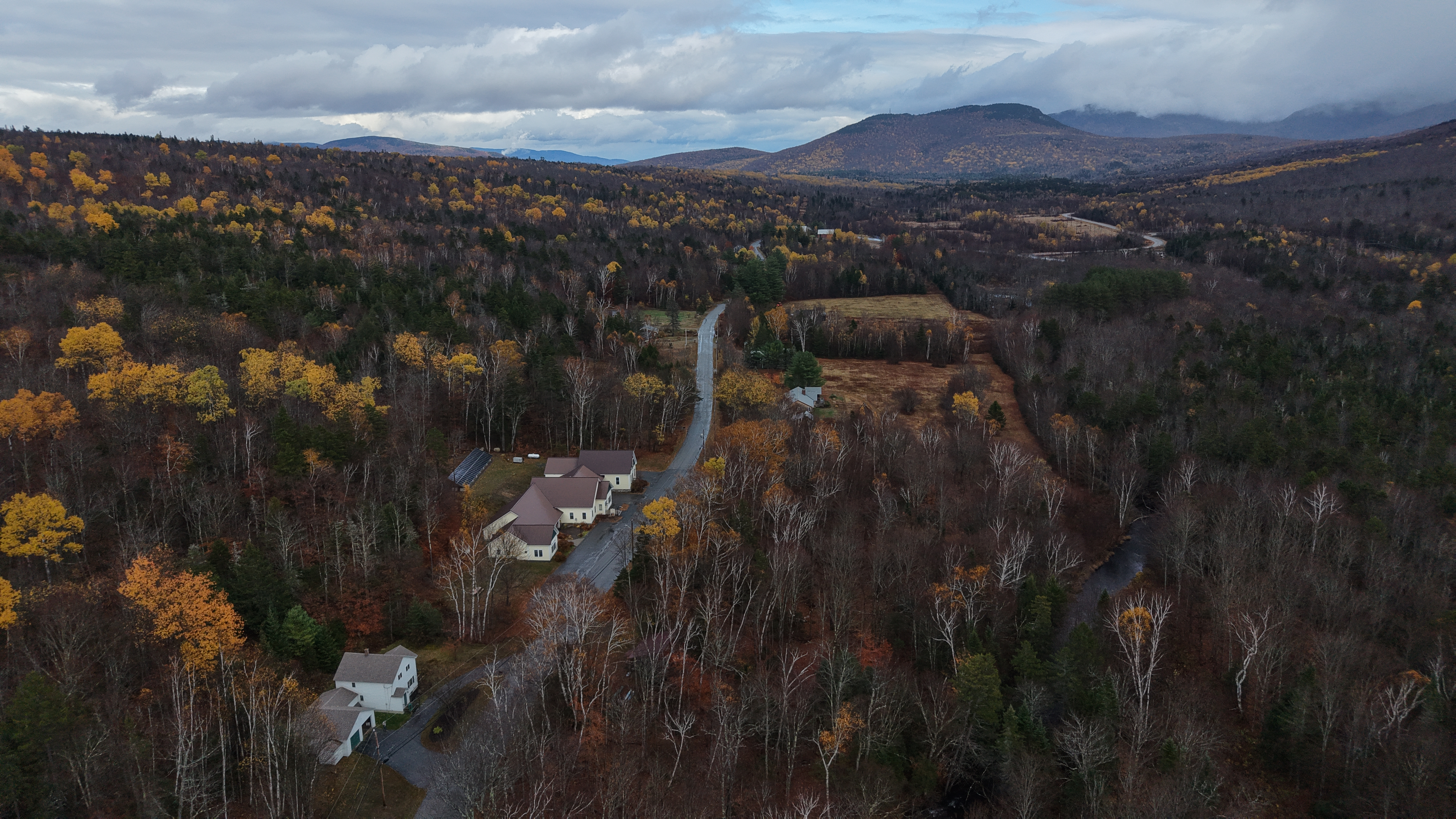
- Randolph, NH, from the west

- Logo

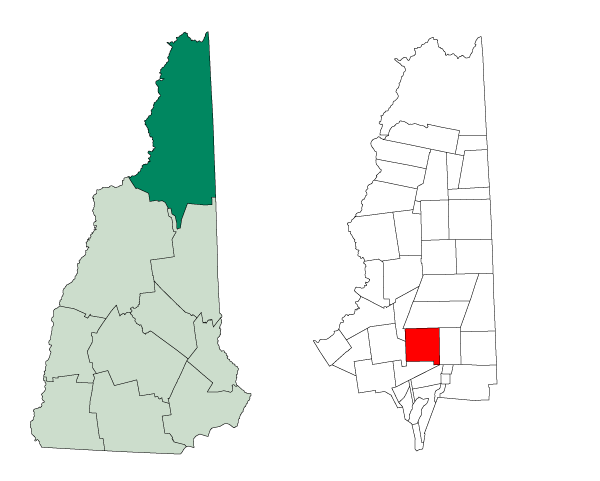
- Location in Coös County, New Hampshire
- Coordinates: 44°22′41″N 71°18′47″W
- Country: United States
- State: New Hampshire
- County: Coös
- Incorporated: 1824
- Villages: Randolph; Randolph Hill; Bowman

Area
  - Total: 47.1 sq mi (122.0 km^{2})
  - Land: 47.0 sq mi (121.8 km^{2})
  - Water: 0.077 sq mi (0.2 km^{2}) 0.13%
- Elevation: 3,068 ft (935 m)

Population (2020)
  - Total: 328
  - Density: 7.0/sq mi (2.7/km^{2})
- Time zone: UTC-5 (Eastern)
  - Summer (DST): UTC-4 (Eastern)
- ZIP code: 03593
- Area code: 603
- FIPS code: 33-63860
- GNIS feature ID: 873704
- Website: randolph.nh.gov

Randolph is a heavily forested town in Coös County, New Hampshire, United States, extending from the northern slopes of the White Mountains of the Presidential Range (to the south) to the Crescent Range and Berlin (to the north), with U.S. Route 2 cutting through the middle. The northern and southern parts of Randolph are within the White Mountain National Forest and the Ice Gulch Town Forest, while the central part is the settled portion of town. As of the 2020 census, the town had a population of 328.

Randolph is part of the Berlin, NH-VT Micropolitan Statistical Area.

== History ==
Randolph was incorporated in 1824, after being originally granted as "Durand" in 1772. The town was named after John Randolph, a Virginia congressman and senator, and a descendant of Pocahontas.

== Geography ==
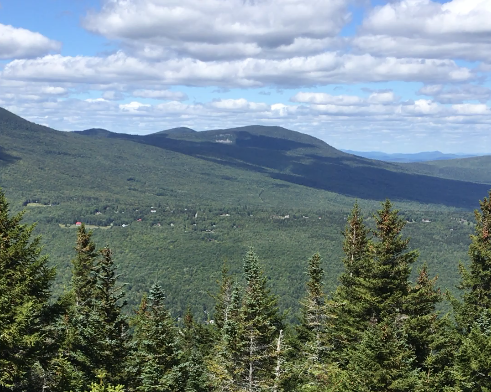
View of the Randolph Hill section of town from Dome Rock

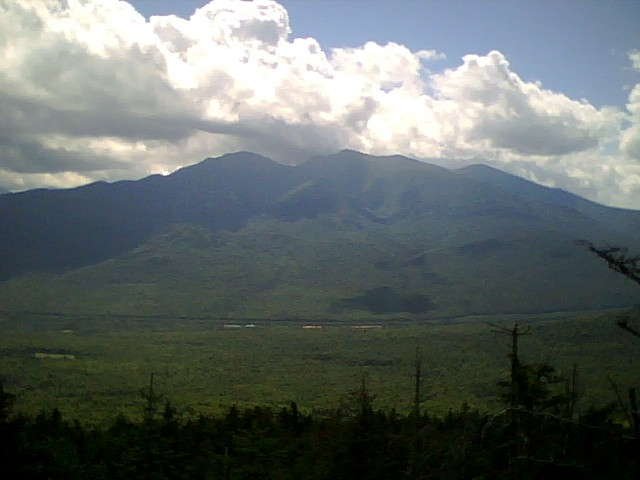
The Randolph Valley section of town as seen looking south from Mt. Crescent. Mounts Madison and Adams of the Presidential Range rise above the town limits to the south.

According to the United States Census Bureau, the town has a total area of 47.1 square miles (122.0 km^{2}), of which 47.0 square miles (121.8 km^{2}) are land and 0.077 square miles (0.2 km^{2}) are water, comprising 0.13% of the town.

Randolph's geography is mountainous. The south side of the town includes the northern slopes of the Presidentials. The north side of the town includes four main mountains: Mount Crescent, Black Crescent Mountain, Mount Randolph and Pond Hill. Dividing the northerly slopes from the southerly slopes is U.S. Route 2. There are no trails maintained to the top of Black Crescent Mountain or Pond Hill. The highest point in Randolph is on the town's southern border, atop a 3,950-foot (1,200 m) knob on Howker Ridge, a spur of Mount Madison.

The settled part of Randolph is divided into two main areas: Randolph "valley", where town hall is, and Randolph Hill, which has several roads all connected to a main road called Randolph Hill Road. Randolph Hill has the site of the Mt. Crescent House (hotel), which opened in 1883 as the "Randolph Hill House" and was torn down in 1971. Randolph also had "Ravine House" on Durand Road, straight north of the Appalachia trailhead. Other sections of town include the area west of Durand Road, which includes Valley Road and a number of houses along Route 2, towards Jefferson. The main Randolph train station was at Appalachia. Other, secondary stations included "Randolph East" on the Dolly Copp (or "Pinkham B") Road, and Bowman, at the height of land to the west.

=== Adjacent municipalities ===
- Berlin (north)
- Gorham (east)
- Thompson and Meserve's Purchase (southeast)
- Low and Burbank's Grant (south)
- Jefferson (west)
- Kilkenny (northwest)

=== Climate ===
Temperatures in the summer can reach nearly 100 °F (38 °C), though that is exceedingly rare, with summer days seldom getting above the 80s (°F) and summer nights frequently being in the 50s or even the 40s. Temperatures in the winter can be below −40 °F (−40 °C). Ice Gulch, in the forest in the northern part of Randolph, contains the largest known subalpine cold-air talus barren in New Hampshire, with a microclimate significantly colder than the rest of the town, containing ice blocks that sometimes survive the entire summer without melting.

== Demographics ==
Historical population
Census	Pop.	Note	%±
1830	143		—
1840	115		−19.6%
1850	113		−1.7%
1860	118		4.4%
1870	138		16.9%
1880	203		47.1%
1890	137		−32.5%
1900	137		0.0%
1910	137		0.0%
1920	67		−51.1%
1930	82		22.4%
1940	114		39.0%
1950	158		38.6%
1960	140		−11.4%
1970	169		20.7%
1980	274		62.1%
1990	371		35.4%
2000	339		−8.6%
2010	310		−8.6%
2020	328		5.8%
U.S. Decennial Census

As of the census of 2000, there were 339 people, 146 households, and 104 families residing in the town. The population density was 7.2 people per square mile (2.8/km^{2}). There were 298 housing units at an average density of 6.3 per square mile (2.4/km^{2}). The racial makeup of the town was 96.46% White, 0.88% African American, 0.29% Native American, 0.29% Asian, 0.29% from other races, and 1.77% from two or more races. Hispanic or Latino of any race were 0.59% of the population.

There were 146 households, out of which 26.0% had children under the age of 18 living with them, 69.2% were married couples living together, 1.4% had a female householder with no husband present, and 28.1% were non-families. 24.0% of all households were made up of individuals, and 8.9% had someone living alone who was 65 years of age or older. The average household size was 2.31 and the average family size was 2.74.

In the town, the population was spread out, with 19.2% under the age of 18, 5.0% from 18 to 24, 25.1% from 25 to 44, 32.2% from 45 to 64, and 18.6% who were 65 years of age or older. The median age was 46 years. For every 100 females, there were 104.2 males. For every 100 females age 18 and over, there were 106.0 males.

The median income for a household in the town was $50,139, and the median income for a family was $52,083. Males had a median income of $40,625 versus $35,208 for females. The per capita income for the town was $25,092. About 2.0% of families and 1.8% of the population were below the poverty line, including none of those under the age of eighteen or sixty-five or over.

Many houses in Randolph are summer/vacation homes. Historically, vacationers tended to visit the hotels, reachable by horse-drawn carriage from the Randolph train station; but as the automobile became more popular, the hotels declined and private vacation homes became more prevalent. Vacationing in the far north was particularly advantageous before the air conditioner became common, as Randolph summers are rarely very hot—and never hot at all in the higher mountain areas.

== Parks and recreation ==
The Randolph Mountain Club was founded in 1910, with the primary goal of restoring trails destroyed by logging. The club's mission is "to promote the enjoyment of the Randolph area through hiking, trail development and maintenance, upkeep of camps and shelters, and the sharing of the collective knowledge of its members." The club operates four camps in the White Mountain National Forest—two enclosed cabins and two semi-enclosed shelters—with a caretaker in residence year-round.

There are two artificial lakes (or ponds) in Randolph: Durand Lake is present year-round, and Ravine House Pool exists in summer from the damming of a mountain stream. There are tennis courts near the Ravine House Pool. All of these facilities are owned by the Town of Randolph and maintained in cooperation with the Randolph Foundation.

== Notable person ==
- Bob Savage (1921–2013), baseball pitcher during the 1940s

== See also ==
- New Hampshire Historical Marker No. 220: The Ravine House 1877–1963
