= Wind power in New Hampshire =

Electricity from wind in one U.S. state

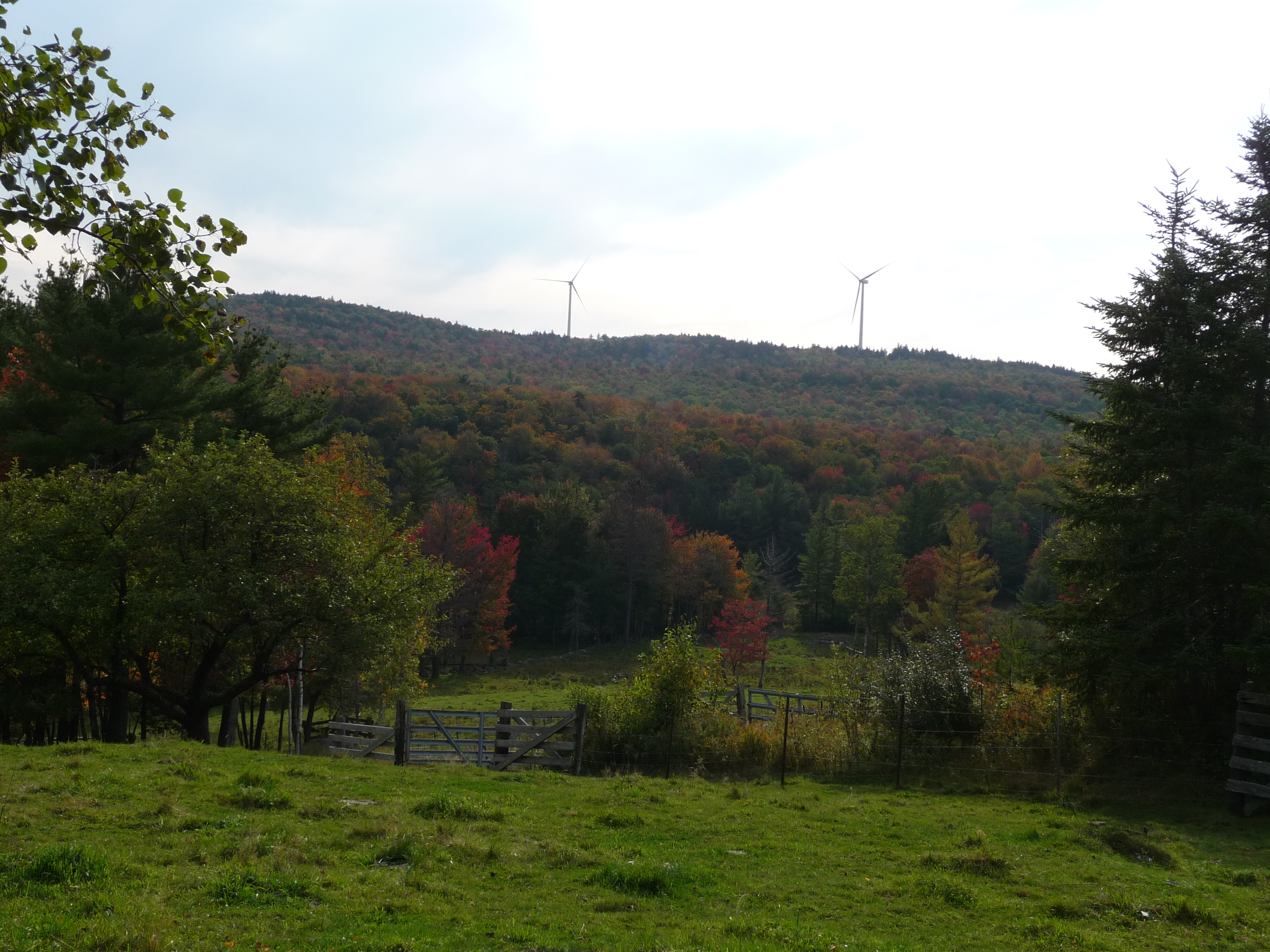
Two turbines of Lempster Mountain wind farm

Wind power projects in New Hampshire
Operating
Under construction
Decommissioned

Wind power in New Hampshire began in 1980, with the installation of the world's first wind farm at Crotched Mountain, consisting of 20 30 kW wind turbines, although it closed decades ago. As of 2020, five wind power projects are operating in the state of New Hampshire – Lempster Mountain, which opened in 2008, Granite Reliable Wind Farm, which opened in late 2011, Groton Wind, which opened in 2012, Jericho Mountain, which opened in 2015, and Antrim Wind, which opened in 2020.

Granite Reliable has 33 Vestas three-megawatt wind turbines on mountains in the Phillips Brook area.

Groton Wind consists of 24 Gamesa G87 2.0 MW turbines, and are located along two ridges west of Plymouth, in the town of Groton. Although there is a high voltage power line to the west of the wind farm, the power is transmitted to a new substation at the Campton–Holderness town line. Turbines are 286 feet (87 m) tall and the blades are 139 feet (42 m) long.

A wind farm in Antrim opened in 2020. It had been expected to begin construction in 2014, but on February 7, 2013, New Hampshire's Site Evaluation Committee rejected the proposal by a 6 to 3 vote, the first time the SEC has turned down a wind project. The primary reason for the rejection was stated as the visual and aesthetic impact the proposed turbines would have had on the Audubon Society of New Hampshire's Willard Pond Sanctuary and the region in general. The project was eventually approved with 9 turbines, one fewer than originally proposed.

New Hampshire is a net power producer, generating more than is consumed. The output of Groton Wind is going to NStar, in Boston, and 55% of Granite is going to Vermont. In 2010 New Hampshire produced 22 million MWh, and used 7.7 million MWh.

A 2009 regulation requires state approval of any energy facility of over 30 MW, and transmission lines over 100 kV.

Name	Capacity (MW)	Energy (GW·hr/yr)	Location (county)	Status
Lempster Mountain	24	70	Sullivan	Operating
Granite	99	224	Coos	Operating
Groton Wind	48	144-158	Grafton	Operating
Jericho Mountain	5	14	Coos	Operating
Antrim Wind	9	29	Sullivan	Operating

New Hampshire wind generation capacity by year
Megawatts of wind capacity

== See also ==
- List of power stations in New Hampshire
- Solar power in New Hampshire
- Wind power in the United States
