= Rumford Archaeological Sites =

Prehistoric Native American sites in Maine

- Rumford Falls I-IV Site
- U.S. National Register of Historic Places
- Nearest city: South Rumford, Maine
- Area: 0.3 acres (0.12 ha)
- MPS: Androscoggin River Drainage Prehistoric Sites MPS
- NRHP reference No.: 92001513
- Added to NRHP: November 14, 1992

The Rumford Archaeological Sites are a collection of prehistoric Native American sites in the vicinity of the Androscoggin River near Rumford, Maine. These six sites provide a window of observation into the movements and practices of Native Americans from c. 7,000 BCE (the early Archaic period) to the Late Woodland period and contact with Europeans. These sites are the subject of three separate listings on the National Register of Historic Places in 1972: the Rumford Falls I-IV Sites, the Rumford V Site, and the Town of Rumford Site. The locations of these sensitive sites are not generally publicized.

== Rumford Falls I ==
This site, Maine Survey Number 49.24, is located on a terrace above the river, and has been undisturbed by plowing. The site is deeply stratified, and has been dated to the Archaic period, with evidentiary finds dating to the early Archaic. Finds at this site include stone tools sourced from Mount Jasper in Berlin, New Hampshire.

== Rumford Falls II ==
This site, Maine Survey Number 49.25, is located on the banks of the river. has been dated to the Woodland period. The site is stratified in time across much of the Woodland period; ten high-quality ceramic vessels were found here. The number and quality of the ceramics found here are the best in the area. Relatively few stone artifacts were found here. The style of the ceramics found are consistent with finds elsewhere dated to the Early and Middle Woodland Periods.

== Rumford Falls III ==
This site, Maine Survey Number 49.26, is located on a terrace above the river. Its features include a depression, which may be evidence of occupation (a house pit). Most of the artifacts collected at this site consist of fire-cracked rock, but stone artifacts from material mined at Mount Jasper were also recovered. The site has been dated to the Woodland period.

== Rumford Falls IV ==
This heavily stratified site, Maine Survey Number 49.27, has been dated to the Archaic period, although there is evidence of later occupation or use. The site includes an open hearth dated to c. 5,000 BCE. Finds at this site include stone tools sourced from Mount Jasper in Berlin, New Hampshire. This site is among the highest above the river, and was intensively used during the Middle Archaic.

== Rumford Falls V ==
This site, Maine Survey Number 49.28, has been dated to the Archaic period, although there is evidence of later occupation or use. It is also where the earliest radiocarbon dates in this group has been found, and it includes a heavily stratified area documenting significant environmental events. Finds at this site include a toolmaking workshop area, and stone tools sourced from Mount Jasper in Berlin, New Hampshire.

== Town of Rumford Site ==
The Town of Rumford Site, Maine Survey Number 49.20, is a Woodland period site, encompassing a particularly well-defined living area. The site is particularly significant because it encompasses at least two separate occupation periods, clearly separated by the site's stratigraphy to periods 500 years apart. Ceramics of the types found in these layers, when found at other sites, had traditionally been folded into a general Late Woodland-Contact Period grouping, but this site's finds made it possible to differentiate them. The site suffers from erosion, particular during exceptionally high-water events.

== See also ==
- National Register of Historic Places listings in Oxford County, Maine

== Sources ==
- Pollock, Stephen; et al. (2008). "Prehistoric Utiliziation of Spherulitic and Flow Banded Rhyolites from Northern New Hampshire". Archaeology of Eastern North America. 36: 91–118. JSTOR 40914525.
