= Sel Hannah =

American ski-area architect

Selden J. Hannah
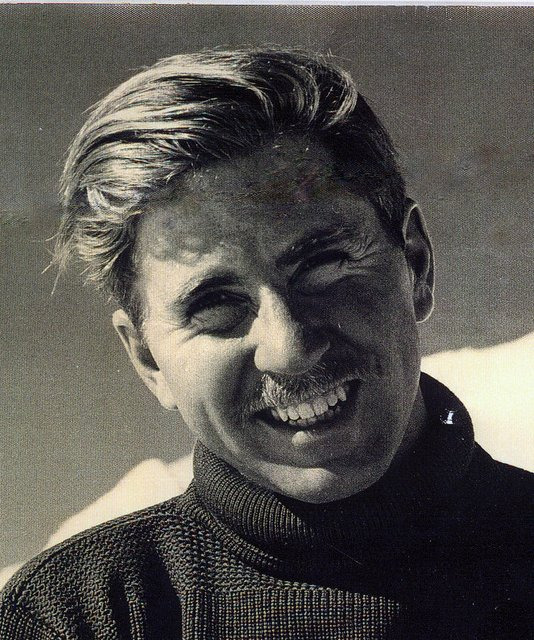
- Selden Hannah
- Born: November 9, 1913; Berlin, New Hampshire, U.S.
- Died: August 31, 1991 (aged 77); Franconia, New Hampshire, U.S.
- Education: Dartmouth College
- Occupation: Ski area designer
- Spouse: Paulie Hannah

Selden J. Hannah (November 9, 1913 – August 31, 1991) was an intercollegiate, US F.I.S. and seniors ski champion who became one of the nation's most prolific ski-area architects. He was enshrined in the National Ski Hall of Fame in Ishpeming, Michigan, in 1968. His legacy remains throughout New England and North America in more than 250 ski areas with which he was associated during his lifetime.

== Early years ==
Selden Hannah, better known as Sel, was born in 1913 in Berlin, New Hampshire, a lumber and paper mill town populated by a colony of Norwegians, who brought their own skis and jumping tradition from their homeland. The Nansen Ski Club built a 45-meter ski jump near Berlin in Paine's Pasture that Sel mastered by age eight. He wasn't much older when he traveled south to Gorham, New Hampshire, and onto Pinkham Notch where he skied on the lower slopes of Mount Washington via the Carriage Road, in Tuckerman Ravine, and occasionally from the summit.

== Dartmouth College & World War II ==
Sel's skiing career coincided with the era when alpine skiing took hold in the United States. In 1933 he finished fifth as a competitor in the first US National Downhill championship on the Carriage Road on Mount Moosilauke. He participated in all four skiing events during his Dartmouth College years and was captain of the Ski Team in 1935.

During World War II, Sel joined Dick Durrance, another Dartmouth graduate, to assist with Colonel Tappen's mission to train a large group of parachutists from Fort Benning, Georgia. Training for the 503rd Infantry Regiment took place in Alta, Utah. Many recruits had never been on skis, while some, in fact, had never seen snow. Durrance needed a cadre of instructors to do the job. To solve that problem, he contacted friends from collegiate ski racing, including Walter Prager, Sel Hannah, his brother Jimmy, and others to train the troops.

After the war, Sel continued to successfully compete in alpine races within the U.S. Eastern Ski Association and other skiing organizations.

== Sno-engineering ==
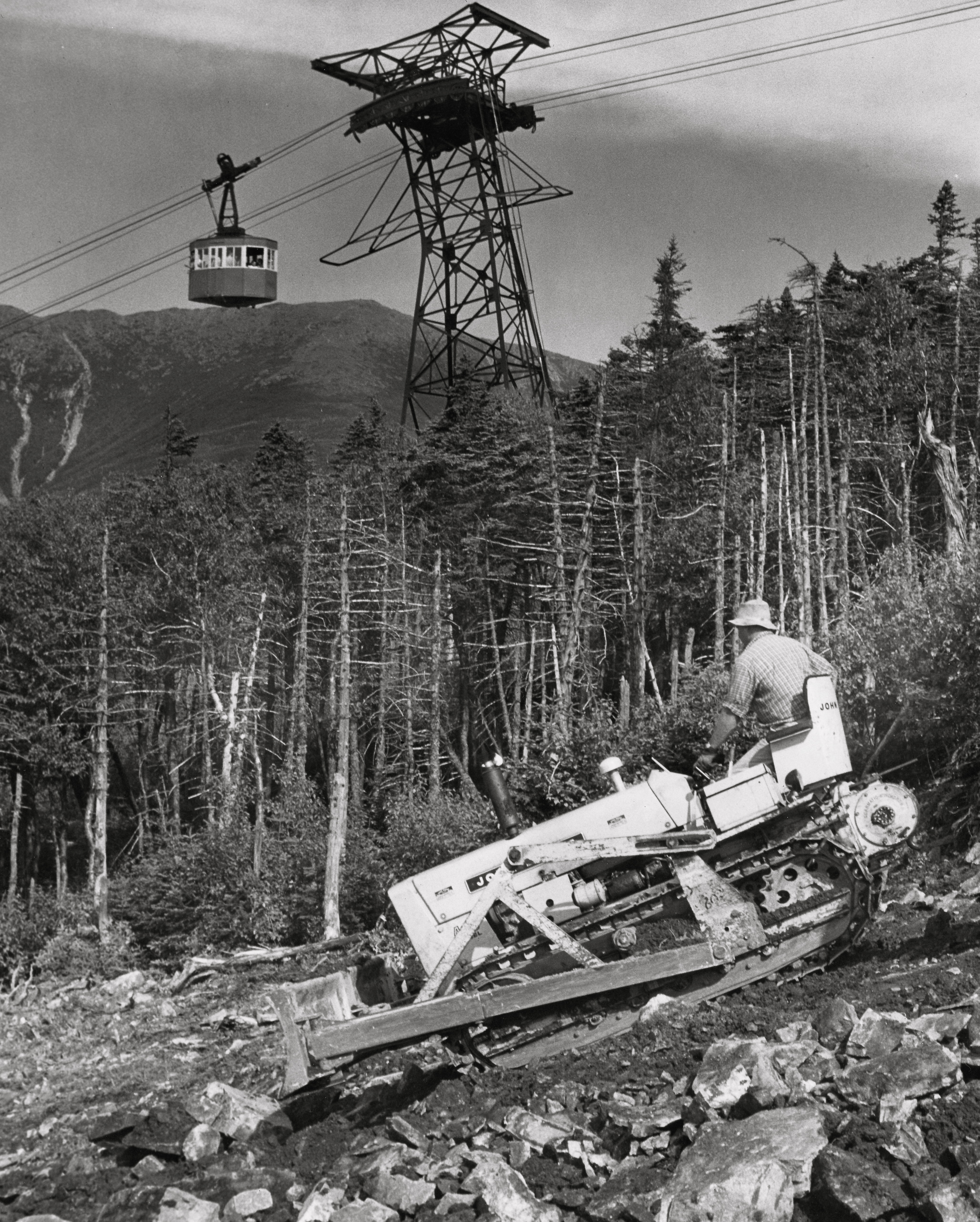
Sel Hannah constructing Paulie's Folly on Cannon Mountain Ski Area

In 1935 while he was a student at Dartmouth College, Sel began laying out Hell's Highway on Mount Moosilauke. In 1936 he was involved with building the Tecumseh Trail in Waterville, New Hampshire. With the rapid growth of skiing in the 1950s, the demand for new ski locations allowed the formation of a company dedicated to designing and building ski areas. Sel founded the firm Sno-engineering in 1958, which began as a hobby but soon grew to a big business. In order to lighten his work load, he resigned as President of Sno-engineering in 1969 and became an independent consultant. An incomplete list of notable ski areas where Sel helped design or build includes:

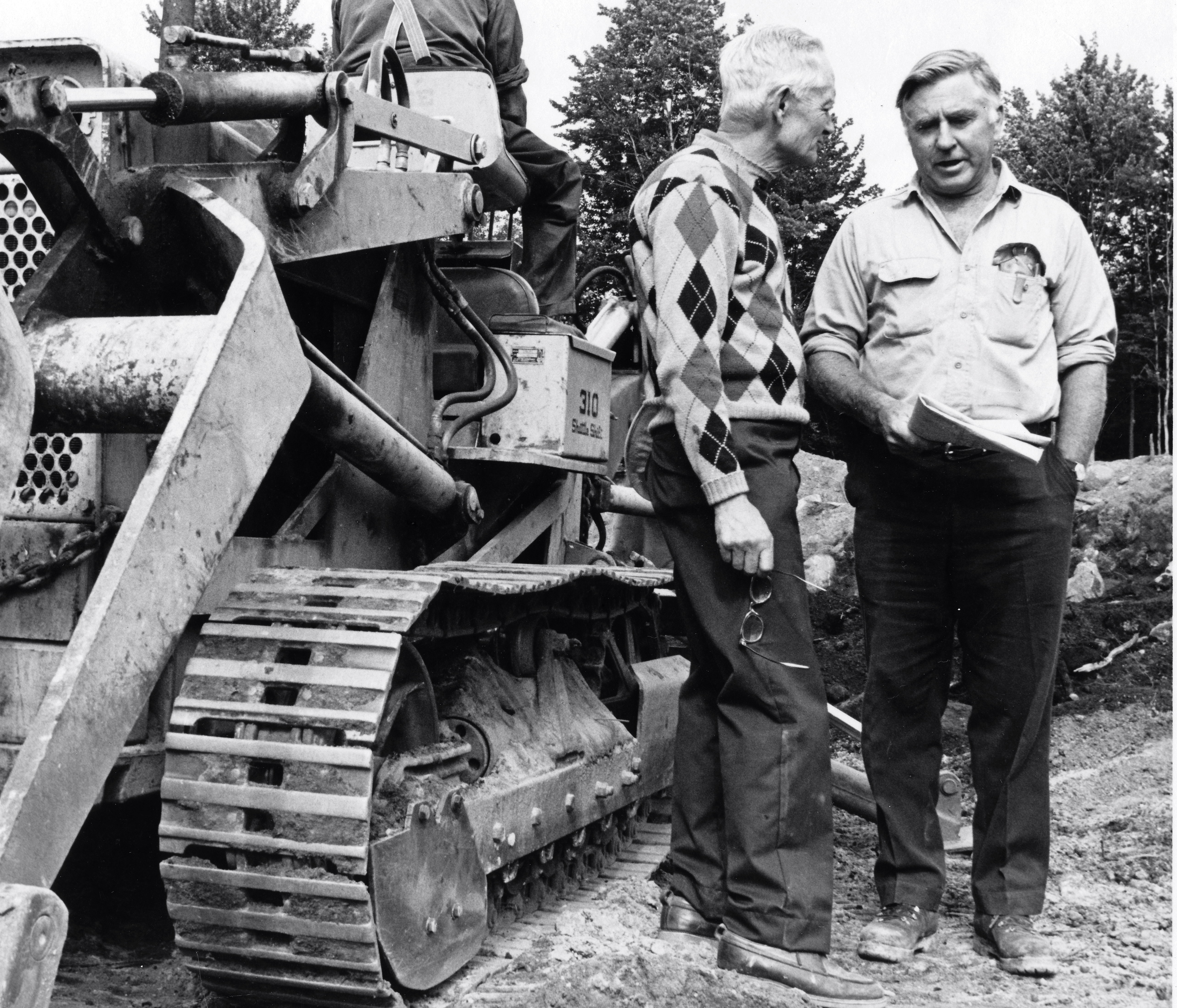
Sel & Sherman Adams discussing Loon Mountain's trail construction

- New Hampshire: Cannon Mountain, Loon Mountain, Mittersill Ski Resort, Waterville Valley and Wildcat Ski Area
- Vermont: Burke Mountain Ski Area, Haystack Mountain, Madonna Mountain Resort and Stratton Mountain
- Maine: Sugarloaf, Squaw Mountain, Sunday River, Crocker and Bigelow Mountains
- Massachusetts: Petersburg Pass Ski Area (Mt. Raimer), Berkshire Mountains study, and Brodie (Ski Area)
- Colorado: Mary Jane at Winter Park and Vail with Pete Seibert.

== Ski Hearth Farm ==
After graduating from Dartmouth, Sel spent a year at McGill Medical School and the next year teaching at Wilbraham Academy, but eventually took up farming. In 1938, Sel and his wife Paulie bought the Elmer Temple Dairy Farm on Streeter Pond near Franconia, New Hampshire.

In 1956 he sold the dairy operation and keep a small beef herd. He began his 75-acre (30 ha) potato business in the late 1930s, which was downsized after the war. The beef and vegetable garden thrived over the next several decades. During the winter months, the newly named Ski Hearth Farm was a communal type lodge for friends, relatives, and clients comprising a Who's Who of the early days of New England skiing.
