= List of power stations in New Hampshire =

Sources of New Hampshire utility-scale electricity generation in gigawatt-hours, full-year 2025:
1. Nuclear: 10,910 (56.4%)
2. Natural gas: 5,319 (27.5%)
3. Hydroelectric: 1,353 (7.00%)
4. Biomass: 800 (4.14%)
5. Wind: 476 (2.46%)
6. Coal: 239 (1.24%)
7. Petroleum: 182 (0.94%)
8. Other: 52 (0.27%)

This is a list of electricity-generating power stations in the U.S. state of New Hampshire, sorted by type and name. In 2024, New Hampshire had a total summer capacity of 4.5 GW through all of its power plants, and a net generation of 16,942 GWh. In 2025, the electrical energy generation mix was 56.4% nuclear, 27.5% natural gas, 7% hydroelectric, 4.1% biomass, 2.5% wind, 1.2% coal, 0.9% petroleum, and 0.3% other. Smaller-scale solar, which includes customer-owned photovoltaic panels, delivered an additional net 408 GWh to New Hampshire's electrical grid in 2025.

During 2019, New Hampshire had two of the three coal power plants, and one of two nuclear power plants operating in New England. More electricity was generated than was consumed in-state. Renewables sources generated 17% of all electrical energy from New Hampshire. Wind generated more electricity than coal for the first time in 2016, while the state did not yet host a utility-scale (larger than 1 MW) solar power plant as of 2019.

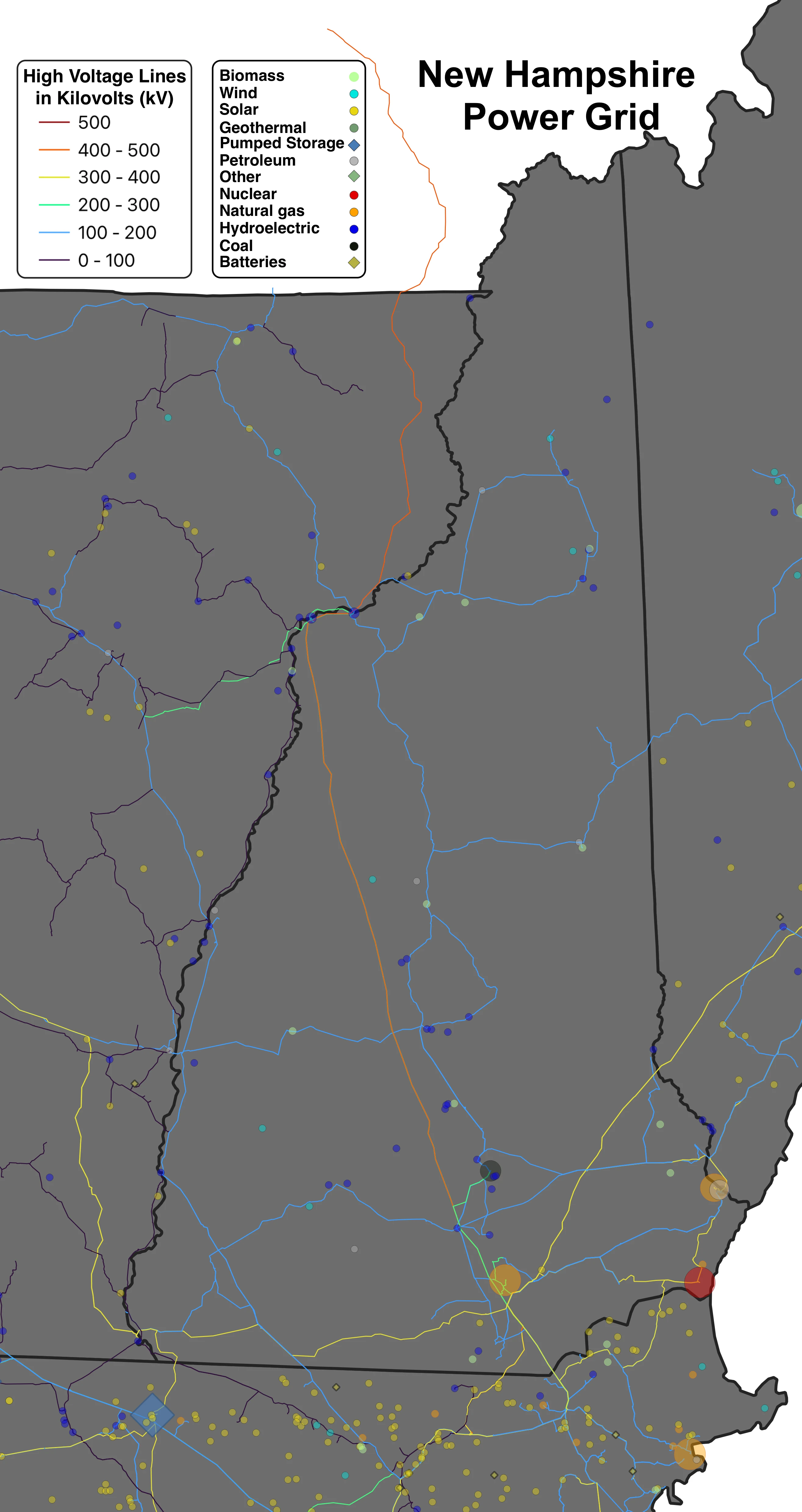
New Hampshire power grid

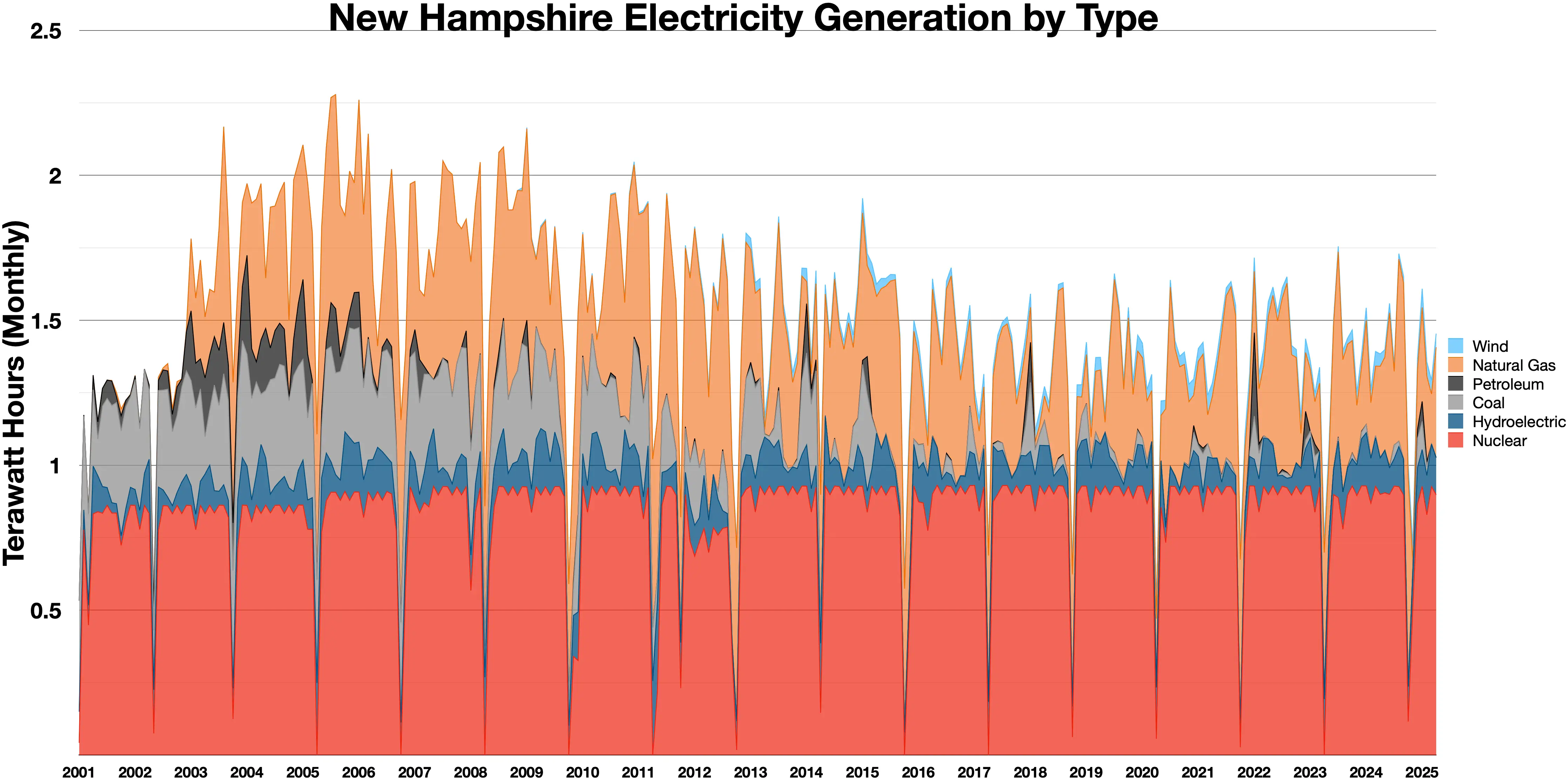
New Hampshire electricity generation by type

== Nuclear power stations ==
Name	Location	Coordinates	Capacity (MW)	Year opened	Refs
Seabrook Nuclear Power Plant	Rockingham County	42°53′56″N 70°51′03″W	1250	1990	

== Fossil-fuel power stations ==
Data from the U.S. Energy Information Administration serves as a general reference.

=== Coal-fired ===
The last operating coal-fired plant in New England, Merrimack Station in Bow, N.H., closed Sept. 12, 2025.

=== Natural gas-fired ===
Name	Location	Coordinates	Capacity (MW)	Generation type	Year opened	Refs
Essential Power Newington	Rockingham County	43.1047°N 70.8061°W	605.5	2x1 combined cycle	2002	
Granite Ridge Energy Center	Rockingham County	42.9042°N 71.4261°W	745.0	2x1 combined cycle	2003	
Hampton Facility Gas Plant	Rockingham County	42.9383°N 70.8406°W	5.0	Simple cycle	2000	
Newington Power Plant	Rockingham County	43.1000°N 70.7908°W	414.0	Steam turbine	1974	

=== Petroleum-fired ===
Name	Location	Coordinates	Capacity (MW)	Generation type	Year opened	Refs
Dartmouth College Cogen Plant	Grafton County	43.7019°N 72.2867°W	7.0	Steam turbine (x3)	1970 (4.0MW); 1992 (3.0MW)	
Lost Nation Plant	Coos County	44.5951°N 71.4944°W	18.0	Simple cycle	1969	
Merrimack Station	Merrimack; County	43.1411°N 71.4692°W	37.2	Simple cycle (x2)	1968/1969	
Plymouth College Cogen Plant	Grafton County	43.7644°N 71.6881°W	2.8	Reciprocating engine (x2)	1994 (1.2MW); 2000 (1.6MW)	
Schiller Station	Rockingham County	43.0978°N 70.7842°W	21.2	Simple cycle	1970	
White Lake Plant	Carroll County	43.8478°N 71.2069°W	18.6	Simple cycle	1968	

== Renewable power stations ==
Data from the U.S. Energy Information Administration serves as a general reference.

=== Biomass and municipal waste ===
Name	Location	Coordinates	Capacity (MW)	Primary fuel	Generation type	Year opened	Status	Ref
Bridgewater Power Plant	Grafton County	43.7155°N 71.6585°W	20	Wood chips	Steam turbine	1987		
Burgess Biopower	Coos County	44.4719°N 71.1753°W	75	Wood waste	Steam turbine	2013	Emerged from bankruptcy in 2026.	
D G Whitefield Plant	Coos County	44.3580°N 71.5449°W	16	Wood waste	Steam turbine	1988	idled 2019	
Indeck Energy Alexandria Plant	Grafton County	43.5608°N 71.7806°W	15	Wood waste	Steam turbine	2008	idled 2017	
Nashua Plant	Hillsborough County	42.7323°N 71.5224°W	2.4	Landfill gas	Reciprocating engine (x2)	1996/2016		
Pinetree Power Plant	Grafton County	44.3274°N 71.6800°W	17.5	Wood waste	Steam turbine	1986		
Pinetree Power Tamworth Plant	Caroll County	43.8358°N 71.1967°W	25	Wood waste	Steam turbine	1987		
Schiller Station	Rockingham County	43.0978°N 70.7842°W	50	Wood	Steam turbine	2006	Idled 2020	
Springfield Power Plant	Sullivan County	43.4429°N 72.0560°W	20	Wood waste	Steam turbine	1987	idled 2019	
Turnkey Landfill Gas Plant	Strafford County	43.2416°N 70.9664°W	9.2	Landfill gas	Reciprocating engine (x4); Simple cycle (x2)	1992/1993; 1997		
UNH Landfill Gas Plant	Strafford County	43.1367°N 70.9361°W	7.9	Landfill gas	Simple cycle	2009		
Wheelabrator Claremont Facility	Sullivan County	43.3440°N 72.3773°W	4.5	Municipal solid waste	Steam turbine	1989	closed 2013	
Wheelabrator Concord Facility	Merrimack County	43.2866°N 71.5769°W	14	Municipal solid waste (biogenic and non-biogenic)	Steam turbine	1989		

=== Hydroelectric ===
Name	Location	Coordinates	Capacity (MW)	Number of turbines	Year opened	Refs
Amoskeag Hydropower Plant	Hillsborough County	43.0022°N 71.4721°W	16	3	1922/1924	
Ayers Island Hydropower Plant	Grafton County	43.5978°N 71.7177°W	8.4	3	1925	
Berlin Gorham Hydropower Plant	Coos County	44.3889°N 71.1645°W	29.2	4	1914-1929/ 1980	
Comerford Hydropower Station	Grafton County	44.3251°N 72.0010°W	168	4	1930	
Dodge Falls Hydroelectric Plant	Grafton County	44.2081°N 72.0581°W	5.0	1	1990	
Eastman Falls Hydropower Plant	Merrimack County	43.4472°N 71.6579°W	6.4	2	1937/1983	
Errol Hydroelectric Project	Coos County	44.7866°N 71.1243°W	3.0	1	1986	
Garvins Falls Hydropower Plant	Merrimack County	43.1655°N 71.5094°W	12.4	4	1925/1981	
Gregg Falls Hydropower Plant	Hillsborough County	43.0168°N 71.5679°W	3.5	2	1985	
Jackman Hydropower Plant	Hillsborough County	43.1106°N 71.9489°W	3.2	1	1926	
Mine Falls Generating Station	Hillsborough County	42.7503°N 71.5053°W	3.0	2	1985	
Moore Hydropower Station	Grafton County	44.3356°N 71.8742°W	192	4	1957	
Penacook Lower Falls Hydro Plant	Merrimack County	43.2858°N 71.5950°W	4.6	1	1983	
Penacook Upper Falls Hydro Plant	Merrimack County	43.2832°N 71.6008°W	3.4	1	1986	
Pontook Hydropower Facility	Coos County	44.6328°N 71.2472°W	10.5	3	1986	
Rolfe Canal Hydro Plant	Merrimack County	43.2746°N 71.6040°W	4.3	1	1987	
Smith Hydropower Plant	Coos County	44.4694°N 71.1781°W	15	1	1948	

=== Wind ===
Name	Location	Coordinates	Capacity (MW)	Number of turbines	Year opened	Turbine mfg spec	Refs
Antrim Wind Project	Hillsborough County	43.0644°N 72.0064°W	28.8	9	2019	Siemens 3.2MW	
Granite Reliable Wind Farm	Coos County	44.7044°N 71.2925°W	99	33	2011	Vestas 3.0MW	
Groton Wind Power Project	Grafton County	43.7681°N 71.8189°W	48	24	2012	Gamesa 2.0MW	
Jericho Mountain Wind Farm	Coos County	44.4669°N 71.2250°W	14.3	5	2015	GE 2.85MW	
Lempster Mountain Wind Power Project	Sullivan County	43.2330°N 72.1455°W	24	12	2008	Gamesa 2.0MW	

=== Solar ===
Name	Location	Coordinates	Capacity (MW_{AC})	Year opened	Refs
Peterborough Wastewater Treatment Solar Array	Hillsborough County	42.9112°N 71.9328°W	0.8 (0.94MW_{DC})	2015	

== Storage power stations ==
New Hampshire had no utility-scale battery or pumped-storage facilities in 2019.

== See also ==
- List of power stations in the United States
