= Mount Forest =

Mount Forest may refer to:

- Mount Forest, Ontario, Canada, an unincorporated community
- Mount Forest Township, Michigan, United States
- Mount Forest (New Hampshire), United States, or "Mount Forist", a small mountain
