= Mount Forest (New Hampshire) =

Mountain in New Hampshire, United States

Coordinates: 44°28′16″N 71°11′58″W

- Mount Forist
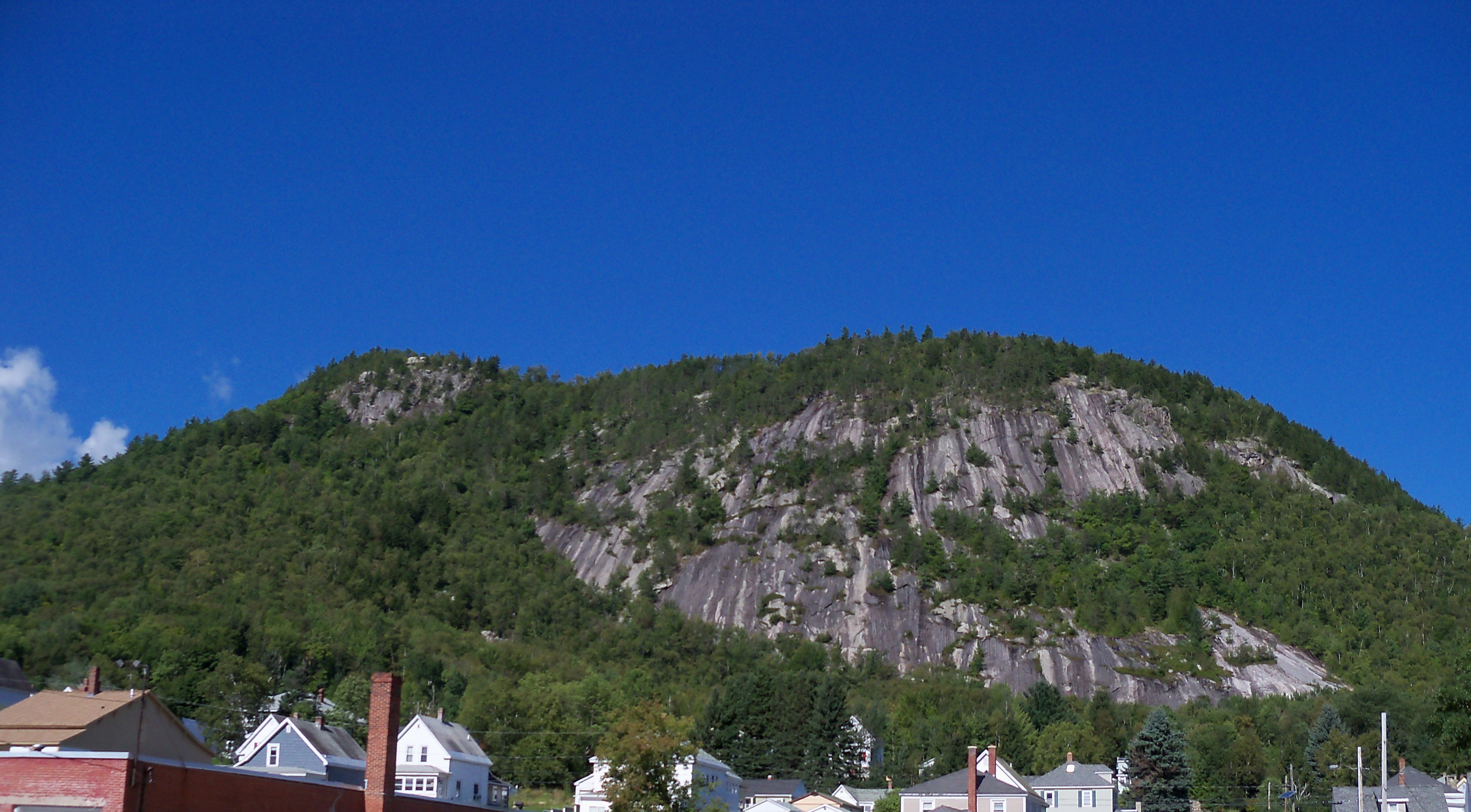
- Mount Forest as seen from Berlin.

Highest point
- Prominence: 2,013 ft (614 m)

Geography
- Location: Coös County, New Hampshire

Mount Forest, locally spelled Mount Forist, is a mountain located in Coös County, New Hampshire, in the United States. The mountain has an elevation of 2,031 feet (619 m), and is a prominent feature of the city of Berlin's landscape. It is sometimes referred to as Elephant Mountain due to its appearance from Berlin.

== Description ==
The mountain is flanked by Jericho Mountain to the southwest, Mount Jasper to the north across the Dead River valley, Cates Hill to the northeast beyond Mount Jasper, and Mount Carberry to the southeast across the Androscoggin River. With 25 established routes to the summit, the mountain is a popular destination for beginner and intermediate hikers. On the southeastern side of the mountain lies the Overlook, from which views of the city of Berlin and the Mahoosuc Range can be obtained.

== Name ==
According to the United States Board on Geographic Names, the name of the mountain is officially spelled "Mount Forest". However, residents of the area spell the name "Mount Forist". The latter spelling is used by the city of Berlin on its official maps and documents.

== History ==
Originally named "Plumer's Fort", in honor of New Hampshire governor William Plumer, the mountain was later renamed in honor of Merrill C. Forist, a school teacher and early settler of the area who operated two hotels that were popular to tourists visiting Berlin Falls.

== See also ==
- List of mountains of New Hampshire
