= Nansen Ski Club =

- Named after: Fridtjof Nansen
- Predecessor: Berlin Mills Ski Club, Berlin Falls Club, or North American Ski Club
- Formation: 1872; 154 years ago
- Founded at: Berlin, New Hampshire
- Legal status: Operational
- Location: PO Box 222, Berlin, NH 03570
- Key people: Peter Higbee, President
- Website: skinansen.com

The Nansen Ski Club is the oldest continuously operating skiing club in North America. Founded in Berlin, New Hampshire, in 1872, the club took on its current name in the 1920s in honor of Norwegian explorer and humanitarian Fridtjof Nansen.

== History ==
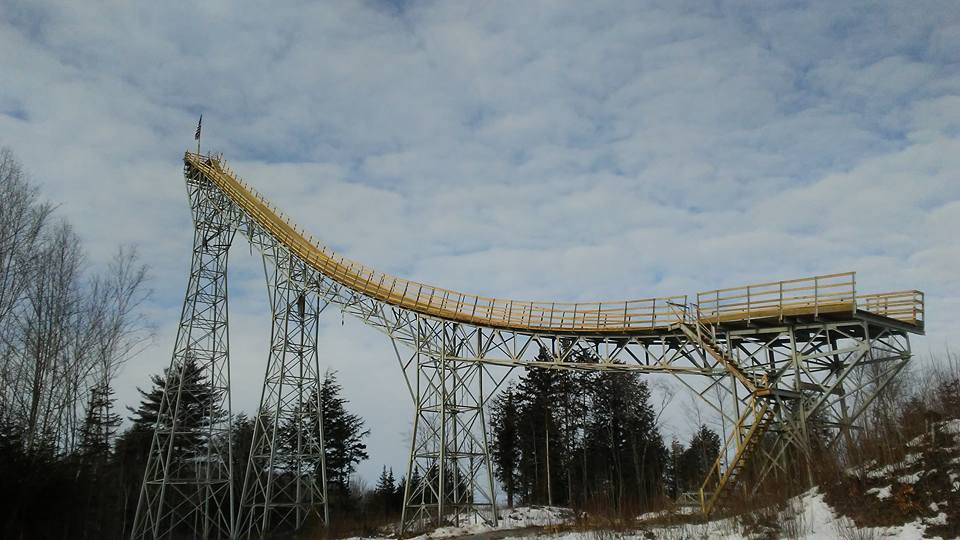
The restored Nansen Ski Jump in early 2017

The club was founded in 1872 by Norwegian immigrants in Berlin, New Hampshire, under the name Berlin Mills Ski Club, Berlin Falls Club, or North American Ski Club (in Norwegian, Skiklubben Nordamerikansk). In the early 1920s, the name was changed to Nansen Ski Club in honor of the explorer Fridtjof Nansen (1861–1930). The club soon built a small ski jump in an area of town called Paine's Pastures. In 1936, the jump was too small and was falling into disrepair, and in 1937, with the help of the National Youth Administration, the new Nansen Ski Jump was constructed on the Berlin/Milan border. The "Big Nansen" was the tallest jump in the United States at that time, and in 1938 the first Olympic trials were held here. Although the ski jump closed in 1988, the club has continued. Restoration of the ski jump started in 2015, and led to a celebratory jump by Olympian Sarah Hendrickson in March 2017.
