= Paper towel =

Absorbent towel made from paper

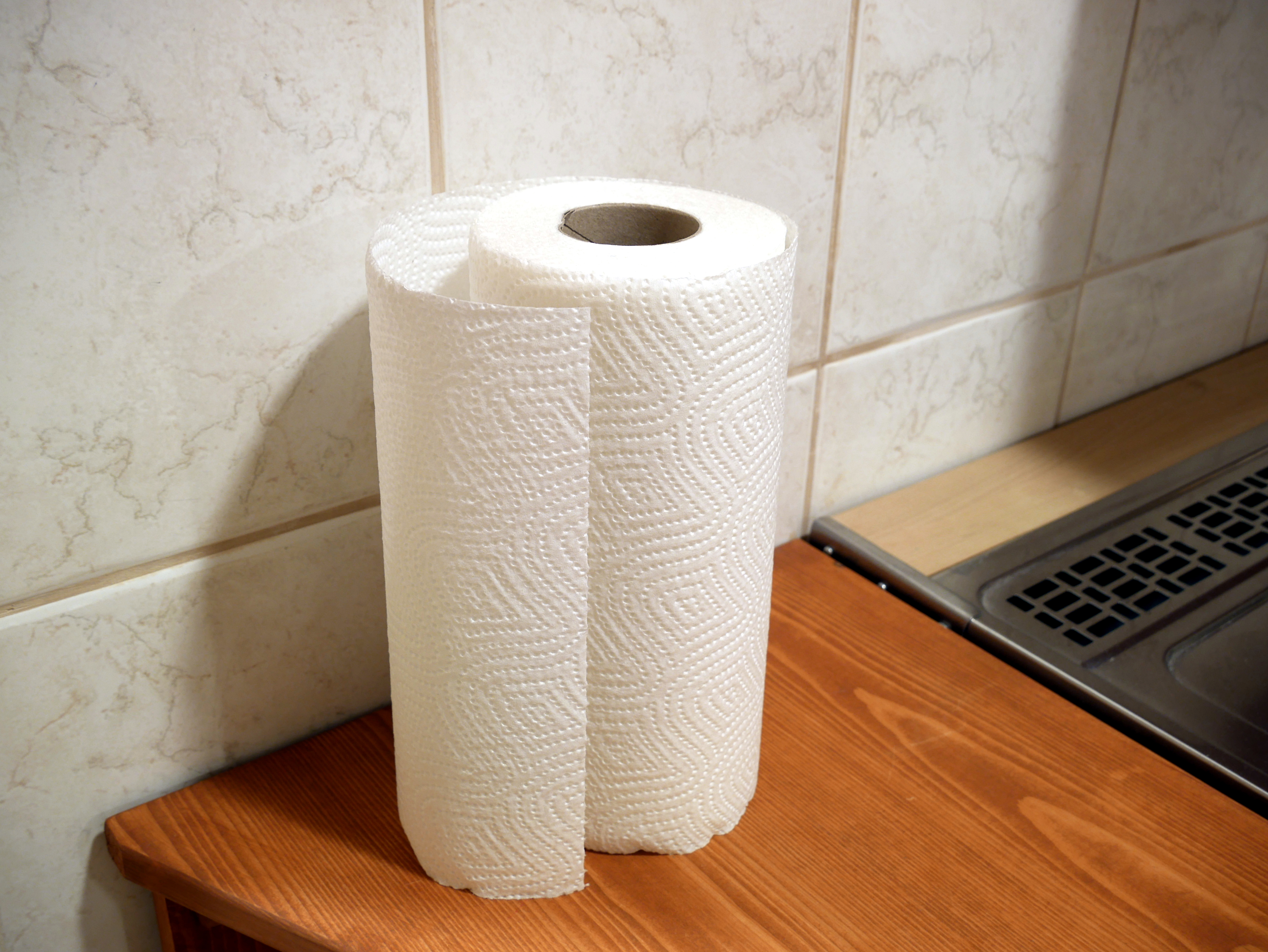
A roll of paper towels (kitchen roll)

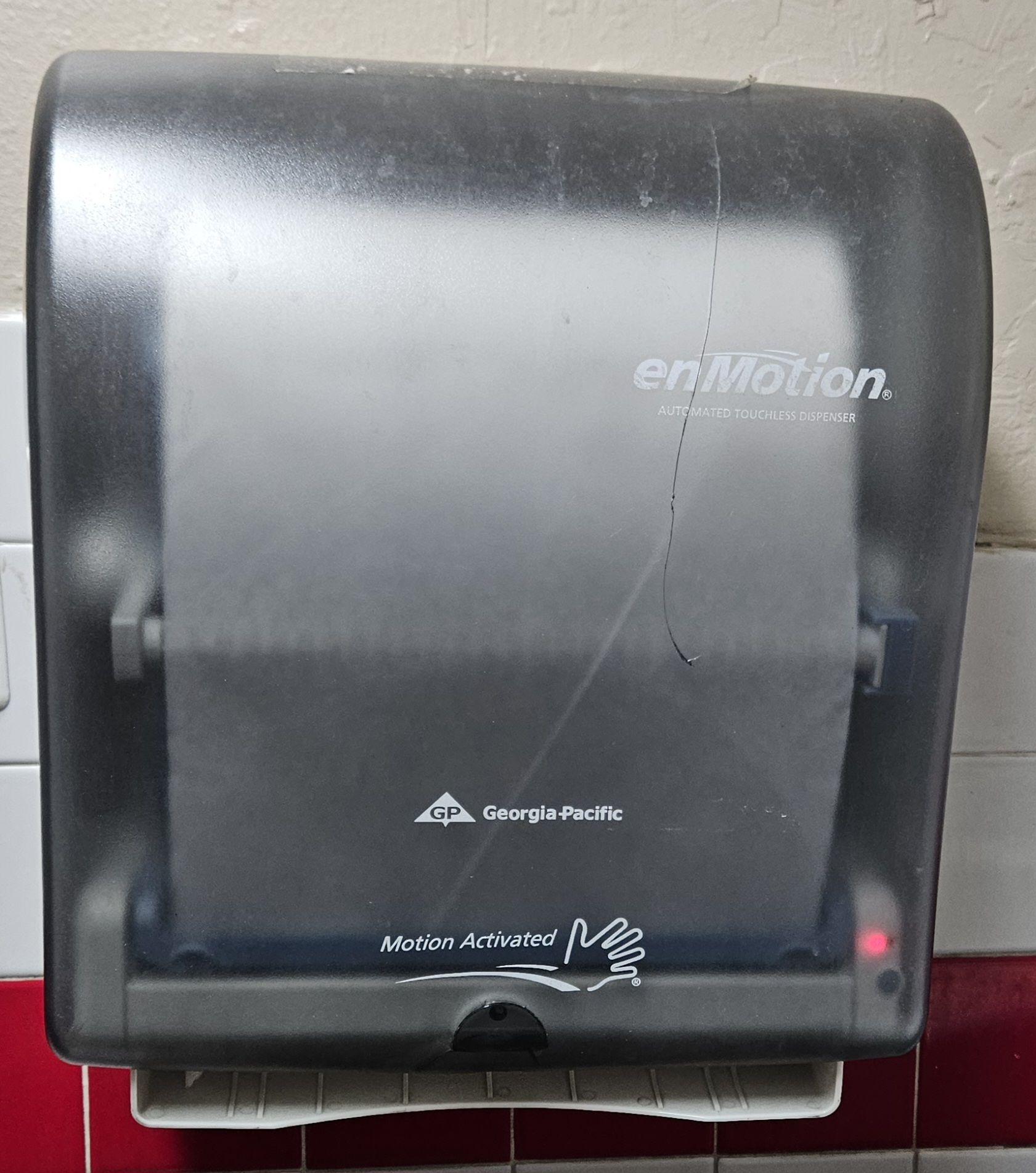
Paper towel contactless dispenser

A paper towel is an absorbent, disposable towel made from paper. In Commonwealth English, paper towels for kitchen use are also known as kitchen rolls, kitchen paper, or kitchen towels. For home use, paper towels are usually sold in a roll of perforated sheets, but some are sold in stacks of pre-cut and pre-folded layers for use in paper-towel dispensers. Unlike cloth towels, paper towels are disposable and intended to be used only once. Paper towels absorb water because they are loosely woven, which enables water to travel between the fibers, even against gravity (capillary effect). They have similar purposes to conventional towels, such as drying hands, wiping windows and other surfaces, dusting, and cleaning up spills. Paper towel dispensers are commonly used in toilet facilities shared by many people (such as at schools or shopping malls), as they are often considered more hygienic than hot-air hand dryers or shared cloth towels.

== History ==
Early paper towels

In 1907, the Philadelphia-based Scott Paper Company developed the first restroom tissues. They started the paper towel industry when they began selling Sani-Towels and used advertising to convince the public that paper towels were essential for personal hygiene.

In 1919, William E. Corbin, Henry Chase, and Harold Titus began experimenting with paper towels in the Research and Development building of the Brown Company in Berlin, New Hampshire. By 1922, Corbin perfected their product and began mass-producing it at the Cascade Mill on the Berlin/Gorham line. This product was called Nibroc Paper Towels (Corbin spelled backwards). In 1931, the Scott Paper Company introduced their paper towel rolls for kitchens.

Paper towels are commonly used for drying hands in public bathrooms. In the 21st century, however, electric jet-air dryers have threatened their dominance. While there is no clear scientific consensus over which method is more hygienic, the paper towel industry and hand dryer manufacturers such as Dyson have each attempted to discredit each other by funding studies which spur sensationalist headlines and running advertisements. The public relations battle has also been fueled by animosity between both sides.

== Production ==
Paper towels are made from either virgin or recycled paper pulp, which is extracted from wood or fiber crops. They are sometimes bleached during the production process to lighten coloration, and may also be decorated with colored images on each square (such as flowers or marketable characters). Resin size is used to improve the wet strength. Paper towels are packed individually and sold as stacks, or are held on a continuous roll, and come in two distinct classes: domestic and institutional. Many companies produce paper towels. Some common brand names are Bounty, Seventh Generation, Scott, Viva, and Kirkland brand among many others.

== Market ==
Tissue products in North America, including paper towels, are divided into consumer and commercial markets, with household consumer usage accounting for approximately two thirds of total North American consumption. Commercial usage, or otherwise any use outside of the household, accounts for the remaining third of North American consumption. The growth in commercial use of paper towels can be attributed to the migration from folded towels (in public bathrooms, for example) to roll towel dispensers, which reduces the amount of paper towels used by each patron.

Within the forest products industry, paper towels are a major part of the "tissue market", second only to toilet paper.

Globally, Americans are the highest per capita users of paper towels in the home, at approximately 24 kilograms (53 lb) yearly consumption per capita (combined consumption approximately 7.8 million tonnes (7,700,000 long tons; 8,600,000 short tons) per year). This is 50% higher than in Europe and nearly 500% higher than in Latin America. By contrast, people in the Middle East tend to prefer reusable cloth towels, and people in Europe tend to prefer reusable cleaning sponges.

Paper towels are popular primarily among people who have disposable income, so their use is higher in wealthy countries and low in developing countries.

Growing hygiene consciousness during the COVID-19 pandemic led to a boost in paper towel market growth.

== Environmental issues ==
Paper towels are a global product with rising production and consumption. Being second in tissue consumption only to toilet paper (36% vs. 45% in the U.S.), the proliferation of paper towels, which are mostly non-recyclable, has globally adverse effects on the environment. However, paper towels made from recycled paper do exist, and are sold at many outlets. Some are manufactured from bamboo, which grows faster than trees.

Electric hand dryers are an alternative to using paper towels for hand drying. Electric hand dryers may also spread bacteria to hands and clothing.

== See also ==
- Hand washing
- Handle-o-Meter
