= Paper-towel dispenser =

Device that dispenses paper towels

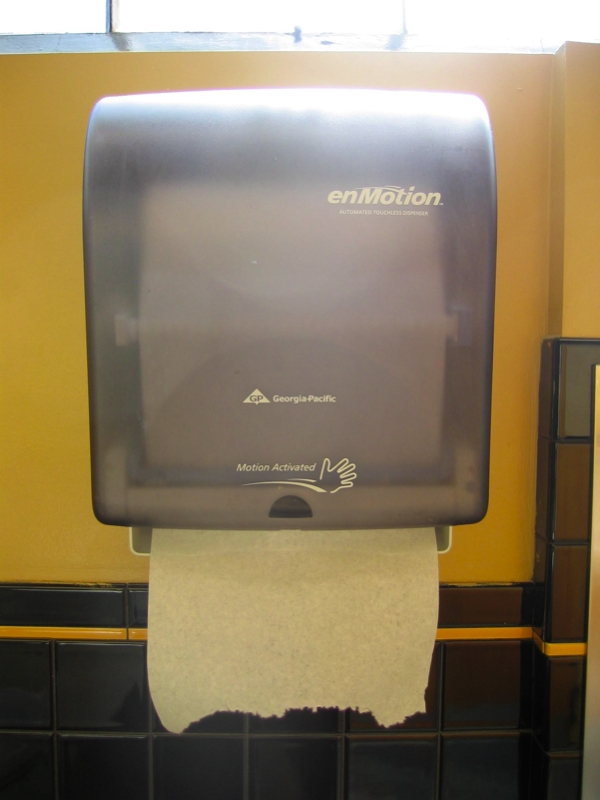
An automatic paper towel dispenser

A paper-towel dispenser is a wall-mounted device that dispenses paper towels in a public toilet so that hands can be dried after hand washing. Some are operated by a handle, some by pulling the paper from the dispenser, and others by automatic dispensation in response to a motion sensor, which is generally powered by an internal battery. Many dispensers also feature a lock-and-key mechanism to prevent paper theft.

Such dispensers are common in North America and other western countries. They are either used to replace hand dryers or used in tandem to offer users alternatives to drying their hands. Some areas opt not to use them as paper towels are more costly than hand dryers, create litter, and are less environmentally friendly than alternatives. However, replacing hand dryers with paper towels is seen as a way to reduce the further dispersal of toilet aerosols in public washrooms known as toilet plume.

== Paper ==
The paper found in dispensers is usually white or brown, depending on whether or not it has been bleached. In some machines, the paper comes on a cardboard roll similar to household paper towels and has perforations allowing them to be easily ripped off, while other dispensers contain paper folded into stacked sheets, which are pulled out one at a time. These kinds of dispensers are sometimes combined with an integrated trash can, which is placed below the dispenser for easy disposal.The third kind of paper towel is torn by an integrated blade.

== Hygiene ==
Research has shown that paper towels from a wall-mounted dispenser are generally more hygienic than electric hand dryers, which have been observed to dramatically increase the presence of bacteria on users’ hands following hand washing. Electric hand dryers also exacerbate the aerial circulation of germs, including fecal particles, found in most public restrooms, which is one of the many reasons most hospitals, clinics, and other areas in which cleanliness is an especially high priority generally prefer paper towel dispensers.

== See also ==
- Soap dispenser
- Toilet Roll Holder
