= Jericho Mountain State Park =

State park in New Hampshire, United States

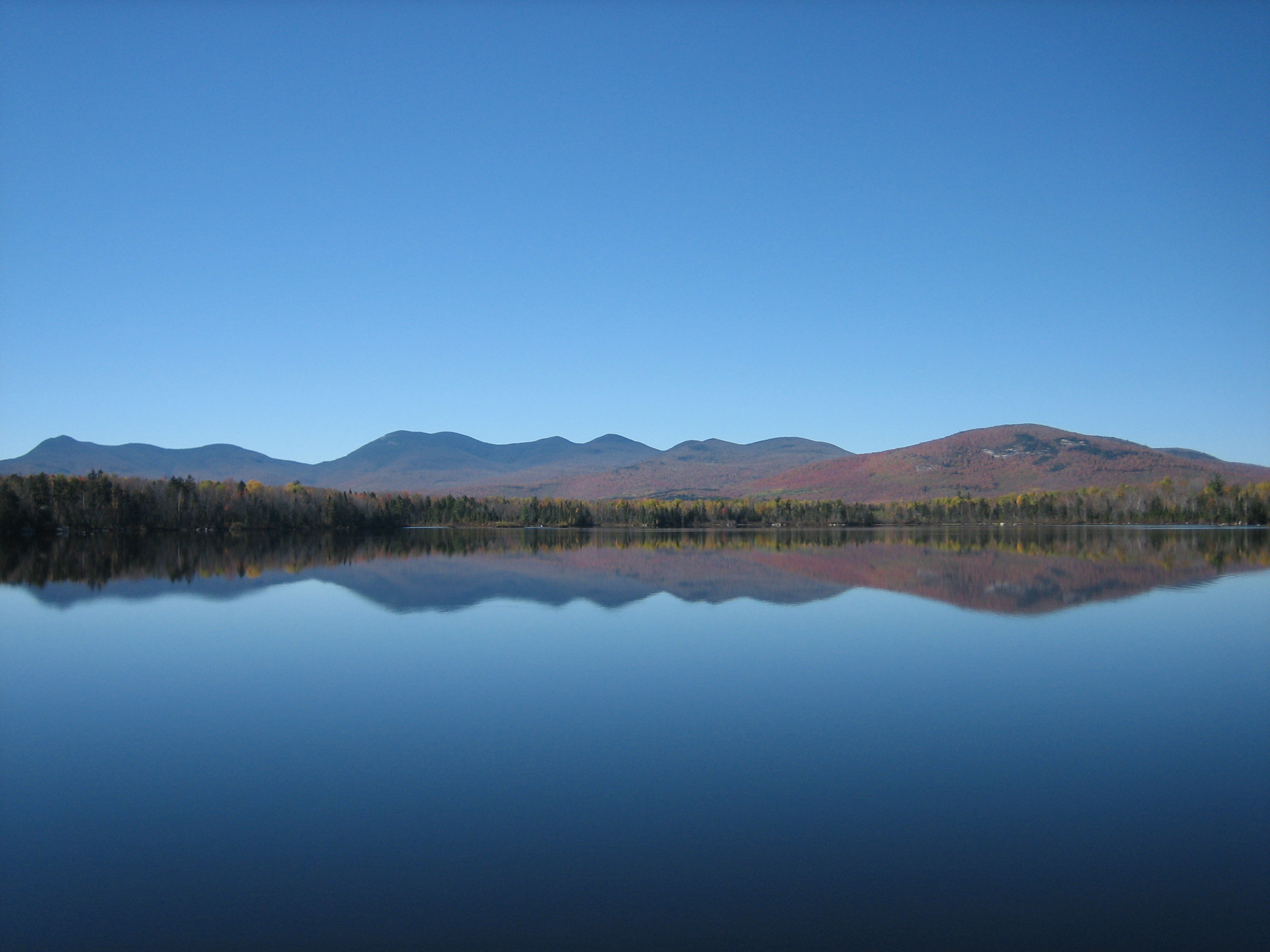
- Jericho Lake, fall 2006
- Interactive map of Jericho Mountain State Park
- Location: Berlin, New Hampshire, United States
- Coordinates: 44°29′47″N 71°15′23″W
- Area: 7,493 acres (3,032 ha)
- Elevation: 1,509 ft (460 m)
- Established: 2005
- Administrator: New Hampshire Division of Parks and Recreation
- Website: Official website
New Hampshire State Parks
Jericho Mountain State Park
- Location within New Hampshire

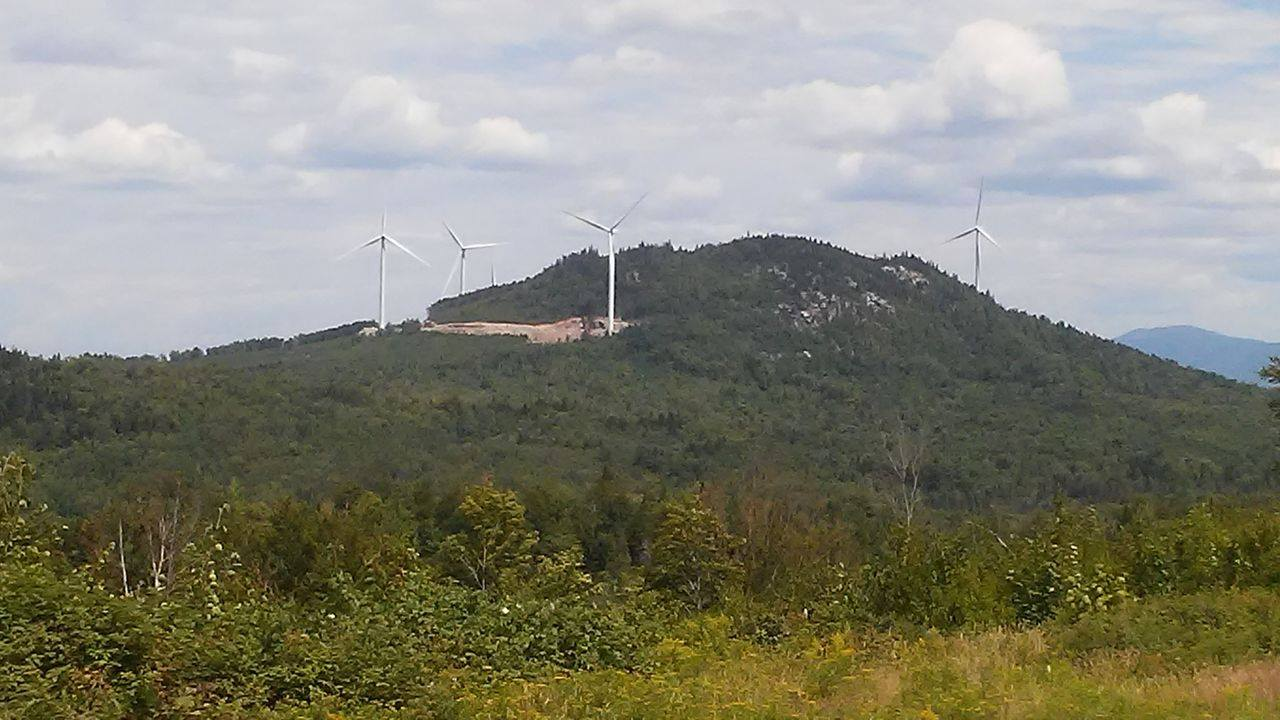
Jericho Mountain (formerly known as "Black Mountain") from Sugar Mountain, 2016

Jericho Mountain State Park (also referred to as Jericho Lake State Park) is located in the White Mountains in Berlin, New Hampshire, United States. The park offers trail riding for ATV, UTV, trail bike, and snowmobile enthusiasts, as well as camping, swimming, fishing, canoeing, and picnicking at Jericho Lake.

== History ==
The park was created in 2005 with the acquisition by the New Hampshire Division of Forests and Lands of two abutting properties: a 230-acre (93 ha) city park centered on Jericho Lake, and a 7,200-acre (2,900 ha) piece of private property to the south.

The city park was established in the 1970s with the construction of Jericho Lake, a flood control reservoir built to regulate the flow of the Dead River through the city center of Berlin, located downstream. The city added a small recreational park adjacent to the lake which included a beach, bath houses, picnic sites with grills, and a shelter.

The large private parcel was acquired by the state park system to provide a location for the first network of all-terrain vehicle (ATV) trails on state land in New Hampshire. The park's namesake, 2,454-foot (748 m) Jericho Mountain, is located outside the park to the east.

In the early years of Jericho, there were many logging camps and sawmills. In 1837, a logging camp caught fire and took the lives of three early pioneers of Berlin, Samuel Phipps, Thomas Wheeler, and his brother Amos.

== ATV trails ==
Jericho Mountain State Park contains 50 to 60 miles (80 to 97 km) of ATV trails, the only major state-owned ATV riding area in New Hampshire. Many of the ATV trails are also snowmobile trails during the winter months. The trail system is operated and supported by the Androscoggin Valley ATV club and by the White Mountain Ridge Runners Snowmobile club, both of Berlin. The ATV club hosts the Jericho ATV festival that takes place every summer at the park near Jericho Lake. Through a maintenance agreement with the state, the club is primarily responsible for the trail maintenance of the ATV trails.

The park's ATV trail system first opened in 2005 and was expanded in the fall of 2010 onto the Head Pond parcel located across Route 110. In 2009 the city of Berlin opened up a new connector trail on city roads connecting the Jericho park trails through downtown Berlin to the Success Pond ATV trail located on the northeastern side of town. In 2012 the neighboring Presidential OHRV Club of Gorham opened two new connecting trails from Jericho park and from downtown Berlin to the Presidential Rail Trail Moose Brook parking area in the town of Gorham, and in 2013 Gorham expanded this by allowing ATVs to ride on parts of Routes 2 and 16 in Gorham village. Thanks to these two additions riders have direct access to food and gas services in both downtown Berlin and in Gorham as well as lodging in Gorham. In 2014, the city of Berlin opened up all city streets within the city's urban compact for ATV use for the purposes of trail access and for providing access to city businesses.

In 2013 as part of the Ride the Wilds effort, a new ATV club, the Sunset Riders ATV club of Success, opened a new connecting trail system between Success Pond and the Millsfield trail system in Errol, allowing connectivity between the Berlin/Jericho areas and other towns and existing riding areas to the north. Riders at the Jericho park can now ride to the towns of Gorham, Berlin, Errol, Millsfield, Colebrook, Stewartstown, Pittsburg, Columbia, Stratford, Groveton, and Lancaster as well as to the states of Maine (Maine registration required) and Vermont (New Hampshire registration sufficient for Canaan Commerce Trail) all without trailering.

== Jericho Mountain State Park 4x4 Off Road Trail ==
Jericho Mountain State Park has a 4x4 Jeep and truck trail, the first one on public land in the Northeastern United States. The trail is 2.5 miles (4.0 km) long and takes from 3.5 to 5 hours to complete in a modified Jeep or truck.
