= Handle-o-Meter =

Instrument for measuring sheet materials

The Handle-o-Meter is a testing machine developed by Johnson & Johnson and now manufactured by Thwing-Albert that measures the "handle" of sheeted materials: a combination of its surface friction and flexibility. Originally, it was used to test the durability and flexibility of toilet paper and paper towels. It is also used to measure the stiffness of packaging film.

The test sample is placed over an adjustable slot. The resistance encountered by the penetrator blade as it is moved into the slot by a pivoting arm is measured by the machine.

== Details ==
The data collected when such nonwovens, tissues, toweling, film and textiles are tested has been shown to correlate well with the actual performance of these specific material's performance as a finished product.

Materials are placed over a slot that extends across the instrument platform, and then the tester hits test. A beam then protrudes through the slot and a strain gauge measures the force that the material exerts on the beam. Stiff materials offer greater resistance to the movement of the beam. Machine direction and transverse stiffness are measured separately.

There are three different test modes which can be applied to the material: single, double, and quadruple. The average is automatically calculated for double or quadruple tests.

Restrictions on measuring the friction between the platform and the material limit the instrument's accuracy.

== Features ==
- Adjustable slot openings
- Interchangeable beams
- Auto-ranging
- 2 x 40 LCD
- Statistical Analysis
- RS-232 Output and Serial Port
- Industry Standards:
- ASTM D2923, D6828-02
- TAPPI T498
- INDA IST 90.3
