= Albert E. Martel =

American politician

Albert E. Martel was an American government official who served as a Boston police officer, member of the New Hampshire House of Representatives, and deputy collector for the United States Customs Service.

== Early life ==
Martel was born and raised in Berlin, New Hampshire. He attended local schools in Berlin and Suffolk University Law School in Massachusetts. During World War I, Martel served in the United States Navy. On April 13, 1920, he was hired by the Boston Police Department. He worked as a patrolman out of the Dudley Street station. In 1926, Martel was fired for neglect of duty and conduct unbecoming of an officer. He returned to Berlin, where he served as Commander of the White Mountain Post of the Veterans of Foreign Wars.

== New Hampshire House of Representatives ==
In 1933, Martel was elected to a two-year term in the New Hampshire House of Representatives. He represented Ward 4 of Berlin and was a member of the Republican Party. As a member of the House, Martel supported legislation to create licensing requirements for barbers and increase the mileage allowances for members of the House.

== United States Customs Service ==
In 1942, Martel was appointed to a position with the United States Customs Service in Boston. In 1947 he was named Deputy Collector of Customs in charge of the Port of Gloucester, Massachusetts. During his tenure in Gloucester, the port became the largest importer of fish in the United States, with more than 300 ships arriving yearly. In 1959, the port collected a record $1.5 million in customs duties. Martel retired from the Customs Service on December 21, 1963.

== Later life and death ==
After retiring, Martel remained in Gloucester. He died on November 6, 1965. He was survived by his wife, five sons, and one daughter.
