= John Ramsey (announcer) =

American public address sports announcer

John Jules Ramsey (July 26, 1927 – January 25, 1990) was a public address announcer best known as the original PA voice for the California Angels, Los Angeles Dodgers, Los Angeles Kings, Los Angeles Lakers and Los Angeles Raiders. He was also the PA voice for the Los Angeles Rams and USC Trojans football and basketball teams. He also announced four Super Bowls in Southern California and one in Palo Alto, California, as well as serving as the basketball PA voice during the 1984 Summer Olympics. His voice was also heard through seven World Series, the 1959, 1967 and 1980 Major League Baseball All-Star Games, ten NBA Finals, the 1963 and 1972 NBA All-Star Games.

== Early life and education ==
Ramsey, a native of Berlin, New Hampshire, served in the United States Navy during World War II. When the war ended Ramsey moved to Los Angeles, attending El Camino College and then the University of Southern California, from where he graduated in 1954 and later obtained a master's degree in business.

== Career ==
Upon the Dodgers' move to Los Angeles in 1958, Ramsey was hired by the team to be their PA announcer. Two years later, the Lakers moved from Minneapolis and Ramsey became their PA announcer. From their inception in 1961 until the mid-1980s, Ramsey was also the PA announcer for the Angels during their tenancies at Wrigley Field and Dodger Stadium and after their move to Anaheim in 1966. And when the Los Angeles Kings began play in 1967, Ramsey became their original PA voice. Over the years Ramsey would also assume PA announcing duties for the Rams and the USC Trojans, with whom he remained until 1989. He also was the PA voice for the Raiders during their first year in Los Angeles. At one time Ramsey would often announce five sporting events over a three-day weekend, a feat rivaled only by Bruce Binkowski, who was a PA voice for San Diego sporting events.

Although noted for an articulate, deliberate and unruffled announcing style, his career was not without the occasional gaffe, as evidenced when a 1960s Dodgers game was delayed: "Ladies and gentlemen, while our ballgame is being temporarily held up because of rainy weather here at Dodger Stadium, our well-known organist, who is located in the centerfield bleachers, is going to entertain you by diddling on his organ." (This announcement was recreated in Kermit Schaefer's 1974 documentary, Pardon My Blooper.)

In addition to Dodger Stadium, Ramsey could be heard at the Los Angeles Memorial Coliseum and Sports Arena, Anaheim Stadium and the Forum. Ramsey left the Lakers and Kings in 1978. His successors included Dennis Packer, who became the PA voice of the Kings in 1979, the Raiders from 1983 until they returned to Oakland in 1995, the Angels during much of the 1980s, the Trojans' PA voice since 1990 and the San Diego Chargers replacing Binkowski; Lawrence Tanter, took over the Lakers and whose career as the Lakers' PA voice has eclipsed that of Ramsey; and Nick Nickson, who took over the Dodgers' and the Kings' PA announcing duties before switching to play-by-play announcing for the Kings in 1993. Former Angels, Clippers and Kings PA announcer David Courtney's career is owed to Ramsey; Courtney began his professional career as a PR assistant for the Kings in 1971 and occasionally filled in for Ramsey at the Forum before becoming a full-time PA announcer himself.

Ramsey could also be heard in various movies, including Two-Minute Warning.

== Death and legacy ==
In later years, Ramsey suffered from diabetes. He died on January 25, 1990, at Long Beach Veterans' Hospital of a heart attack at age 62.

John Ramsey's grandson, John Lamb, born seven months after Ramsey's death, made his Major League Baseball debut as the starting pitcher for the Cincinnati Reds at Dodger Stadium on August 14, 2015.
