= Ted Hodgdon =

- Born: Theodore A. Hodgdon; 1902; Berlin, New Hampshire
- Died: 1984 (aged 81–82)

Ted Hodgdon (1902–1984) was a motorcycle journalist, corporate publicist, motorcycle distribution executive, and antique motorcycle enthusiast. He was an executive in various positions for American Motorcyclist Association, and was one of the founders, and later president, of the Antique Motorcycle Club of America.

== Early life ==
Hodgdon was born 1902 in Berlin, New Hampshire. His family moved to Springfield, Massachusetts, where Hodgdon began riding motorcycles and flying aircraft.

== Career ==
Upon graduating from college in 1926, Hodgdon was hired by Springfield motorcycle manufacturer Indian as a marketing and technical writer whose dutied included editing the corporate newsletter Indian News, designing advertisements, and writing owner's manuals. He was promoted to advertising manager in 1929, and continued in that position until 1934. He was described in an introduction to a 1932 Motor Mechanics article as "one of the leading authorities on motorcycle hill-climbing and racing".

Hodgdon wrote an instruction manual for the United States Army titled How To Ride Rough Terrain, which the United States Army used in World War Two.

In 1954, Hodgdon was appointed president of BSA Inc., the United States subsidiary of British motorcycle manufacturer BSA. Earlier that year, he was one of the four men who founded the Antique Motorcycle Club of America, and was initially the club's vice-president.

== Retirement and death ==
Hodgdon retired in 1968, but continued to write about antique motorcycles.

Hodgdon died in 1984. He was inducted to the Motorcycle Hall of Fame in 1998.

== Bibliography ==
- Hodgdon, Ted A. (1929), How to Design, Build and Fly Your Own Light Airplane (Booklet)
- Hodgdon, Ted A. (c. 1942). How To Ride Rough Terrain. U.S. Army.
- Hodgdon, Ted A. (1973). Motorcycling's Golden Age of the Fours. Bagnall Publishing Company.
