= Hawkins v. McGee =

1929 New Hampshire Supreme Court case

- Court: New Hampshire Supreme Court
- Decided: June 4, 1929
- Citation: 84 N.H. 114, 146 A. 641 (N.H. 1929)

Keywords
- Expectation damages

Hawkins v. McGee, 84 N.H. 114, 146 A. 641 (N.H. 1929), is a leading case on damages in contracts handed down by the New Hampshire Supreme Court. It has come to be known as the "Hairy Hand" case from the circumstances, because a subsequent decision uses the phrase.

This case is famous for its mention in the John Jay Osborn Jr. novel The Paper Chase and in the film and television versions of that work, as well as its use in legal education.

== Background ==
George A. Hawkins' hand was scarred from contact with an electrical wire, after turning on the light in his family home's kitchen when he was 11 years old (1915). His father, Charles, was approached by Edward R. B. McGee, a local doctor in Berlin, New Hampshire, about having the scars removed. McGee guaranteed to make the injured hand a "one hundred percent good hand". McGee used a technique of "skin grafting" that he was unfamiliar with and failed to remove the scars. Because McGee used skin from Hawkins's chest area, the graft caused the palm of Hawkins' hand to grow thick hair.

== Case ==
Hawkins sued under a theory of breach of contract and negligence in 1926, though the negligence claim was immediately dismissed. He was paid for damages from the pain from the operation and the damage that the operation had caused to his hand. The central two issues before the court were if the defendant, by guaranteeing a “one hundred percent good hand,” made a legally enforceable promise which started a contract, and, more importantly, what type of damages should be awarded.

On appeal, the New Hampshire Supreme Court held that the amount of damages awarded should be equal to the difference between the value of what Hawkins was promised to receive—a "one hundred percent good hand"—and what he in fact received—a hairy palm—as well as any incidental losses he incurred as a result of the breach. This is known as expectation interest (or expectation damages), which attempts to put the plaintiff into a position where they would have been had the contract not been breached. The court made a point of dismissing the argument on damages for the pain and suffering because pain and suffering were an implicit part of the contract for surgery.

== Relevant law ==
The case does not stand for the principle that expectation damages are the only proper measure of damages — there are many other measures. Another, for example, would be the cost to fix the hand, and another would be the difference between what Hawkins got and what he had before. The court found only that this was the proper measure of damages in a case of this kind in New Hampshire.

== Later use ==
This case has been a staple of casebooks on contract law for decades, and has come to be known as the "Hairy Hand Case" (or, sometimes, the "Case of the Hairy Hand") because the subsequent decision in McGee v. United States Fidelity & Guaranty Co., 53 F.2D 953 (1st Cir. 1931) uses the phrase. In that case, Doctor McGee sued his malpractice insurer for coverage of the damages awarded in the original lawsuit. The Hawkins family did not know of the case's prominence in contract casebooks until 1964 when Gail Hawkins (George's niece) encountered it in her first-year contracts class at Boston University School of Law.

Professor Kingsfield refers to the "Hairy Hand" case in the opening scenes of the popular movie The Paper Chase and its television version. Harvard contract law classes actually began with this lesson for many years (and frequently still do) as part of Oliver Wendell Holmes Jr.'s theory that the study of contract law should begin with the remedies for a broken promise. The family did not learn about the case's use in The Paper Chase until Gail's mother, Edith, saw the movie during its first run in 1973. The 2018 film On the Basis of Sex also cites the case in a contract law class.

In a medical and legal review of the first episode of Law & Order of a LegalEagle and Doctor Mike collaboration, the case was cited.
