= William E. Corbin =

- Born: 1869; Charlestown, New Hampshire
- Died: October 13, 1951 (aged 81–82); Berlin, New Hampshire
- Occupation(s): Inventor, Superintendent of Riverside and Cascade Mill
- Spouse: Mary Richardson
- Children: 1 daughter

William E. Corbin (1869–1951) was the inventor of Nibroc paper towels and was the mayor of the city of Berlin, New Hampshire (1931–1932).

== Early life and career ==
Early Nibroc packaging

Official Nibroc packaging

William E. Corbin was born in 1869 in Charlestown, New Hampshire to Samuel and Mary Corbin. As a child, Corbin worked on a farm in Charlestown, New Hampshire. For a short time Corbin worked at the Government Cheney mill in Manchester. He later moved to Berlin, New Hampshire, on May 27, 1892, where he was employed at the Riverside Mill of the Brown Company. In 1894, he became superintendent of this mill. In 1904, the Brown Company built the Cascade Mill on the border of Berlin and Gorham. Corbin became the first superintendent of this new mill. Along with being the superintendent of the Cascade Mill, Corbin became a director in the Berlin National Bank in 1906 and, in 1913, became the president of this bank. In 1931, Corbin became mayor of the city of Berlin, serving until 1932.

== Nibroc towels ==
In 1919, Mr. Corbin, along with Harold Titus and Henry Chase, the Brown Company's first chemist, started to experiment at the Research and Development building to improve the problems of papermaking, to include the Nibroc Paper Towels. In 1922, Corbin had completed the first paper towels. Before this, there were only cloth towels but no official paper towel. This paper towel was called “Nibroc”, which is Corbin spelled backwards.

== Death and legacy ==
On October 13, 1951, "the father of paper towels", William E. Corbin, died at his home. He was buried at Forest Hill Cemetery in the town of his birth. Nibroc paper towels were produced by the Brown Company until the 1970s.

== See also ==
- Berlin, New Hampshire
- paper towel
- papermaking
