= Jericho Mountain =

Mountain in Coös County, New Hampshire, USA

- Black Mountain
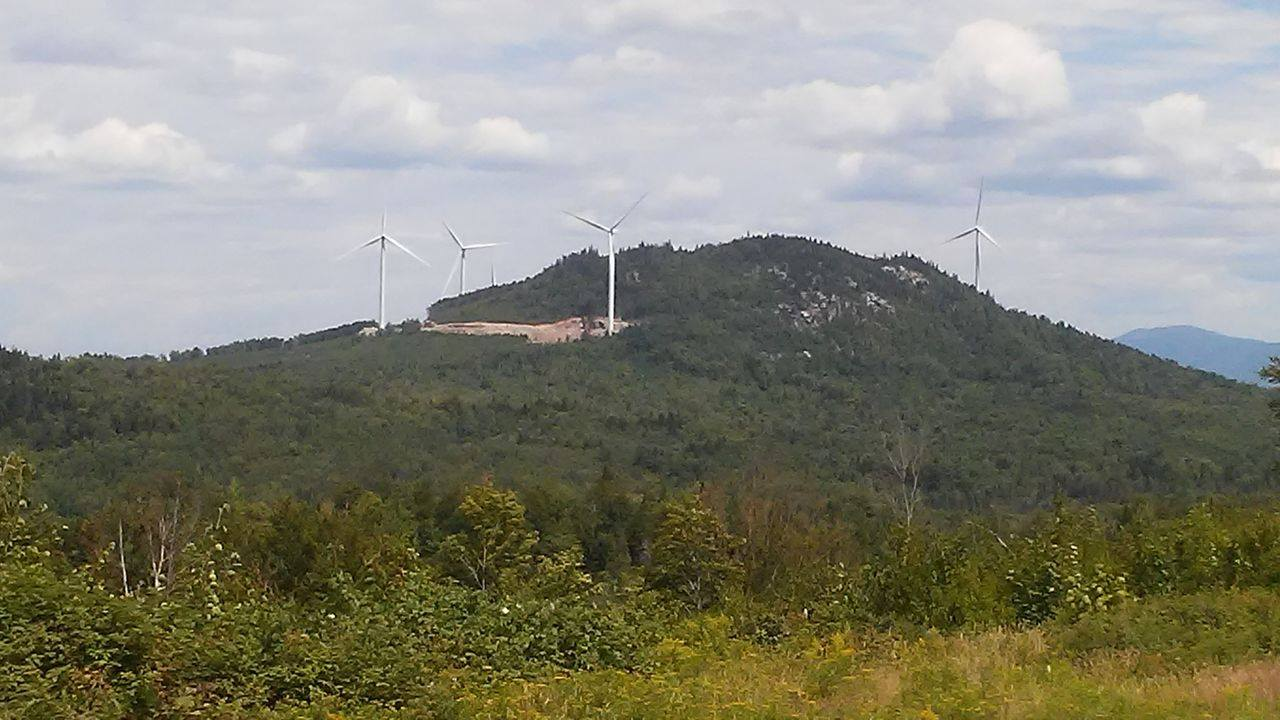
- Jericho Mountain as seen from Sugar Mountain

Highest point
- Elevation: 2,454 feet (748 m)
- Coordinates: 44°28′0″N 71°13′19″W

Geography
- Location: Coös County, New Hampshire, United States

Jericho Mountain, also known locally as Black Mountain, is a mountain in Coös County, New Hampshire, in the United States. It has an elevation of 2,454 feet (748 m).

== Description ==
Jericho Mountain is flanked by Mount Forist to the northeast, and to the southwest by Sugar Mountain and the Crescent Range. Jericho Mountain is within the city limits of Berlin, the settled part of which lies 2 miles (3 km) to the east, where many views of the mountain can be obtained.

== History ==
The Abenaki people called the mountain Miccasadenauk, meaning "mountain with a black summit", which gave way to its original English name, "Black Mountain". The Abenaki name, and ultimately the English one, may have came about due to the mountain's long history of forest fires, the trees being destroyed leaving a rocky summit blackened by ash. The last of these great fires occurred in 1903.

In 1935, the United States Forest Service requested the United States Board on Geographic Names to rename the mountain to distinguish it from six other "Black Mountains" in the White Mountain National Forest. The name suggested was "Jericho Mountain", after Jericho Brook near the base of the mountain. Despite the new name being officially approved by the BGN on April 25, 1936, many locals still refer to the mountain by its former name.

In 2006, Jericho Mountain became the site of the first wind farm in the state, when Loranger Power Generation constructed three 160-foot-tall (49 m) wind turbines near the summit. The turbines were soon after vandalized and were decommissioned, and the 135-acre (55 ha) site was sold to Jericho Mountain Wind Company. Jericho Power, LLC, later leased the land and erected five 500-foot (150 m) turbines in 2014.

== See also ==
- Jericho Mountain State Park, located north and west of the mountain
- List of mountains of New Hampshire
