= Mount Jasper Lithic Source =

- Mt. Jasper Lithic Source
- U.S. National Register of Historic Places
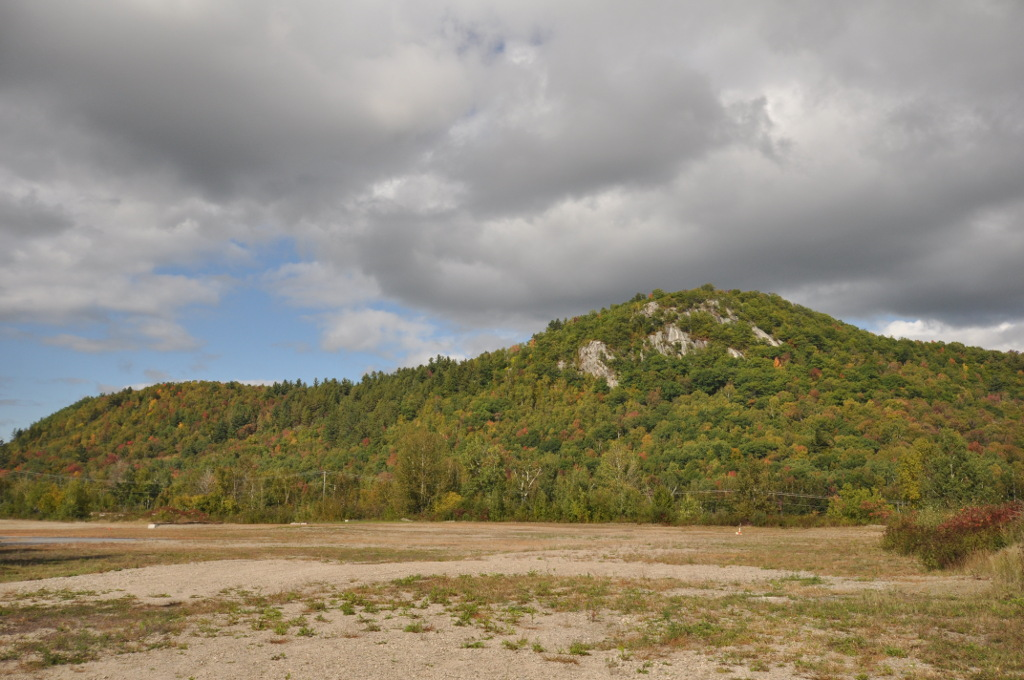

- Location within New Hampshire Location within the United States
- Location: 1 1/2 mi. NW of confluence of Dead R. and Androscoggin R., Berlin, New Hampshire
- Coordinates: 44°29′8″N 71°11′40″W
- Area: 38.5 acres (15.6 ha)
- NRHP reference No.: 92000631
- Added to NRHP: May 29, 1992

The Mount Jasper Lithic Source is a prehistoric archaeological site in Berlin, New Hampshire. Located on the slopes of Mount Jasper on the north side of the city, it includes one of the only known evidences of mining by pre-Contact Native Americans in the eastern United States. The mountain is a source of rhyolite, apparently prized for its qualities in the manufacture of stone tools. The site includes a mine shaft about 9 metres (30 ft) deep, as well as workshops at the base and summit of the mountain. The site was added to the National Register of Historic Places in 1992.

== Description ==
Mount Jasper is a low peak 1 1/2 miles northwest of the confluence of the Dead River and Androscoggin River in Berlin, New Hampshire. Its summit is at 1,584 feet (483 m) above sea level, and its base at the Dead River is about 1,040 feet (320 m). It is visually distinguished by a steep rocky slope near its summit. The geology of the mountain includes bands of rhyolite. The site, owned by the city of Berlin, encompasses a triangular area from the summit to points on the Dead River. Its principal features include one or more short mine shafts that follow the seams of rhyolite in the upper reaches of the mount, and workshop areas at both the summit and river-facing base of the mountain. While the deepest mine is 9 metres (30 ft) deep, there is ample evidence that other exposed seams of rhyolite were extensively quarried.

== Significance ==
The site is historically and archaeologically important as a source of rhyolite, and was identified in the 19th century as a Native American source of the stone. Archaeological investigation of the area conducted in the 1980s identified not only the locations where natives quarried the stone, but has also determined that workshops (where finished materials such as weapon points were fashioned) were located there. Evidence from this and other sites indicates that it was a source of stone for tools as much as 9,000 years ago, and it is unique in the eastern United States in that the natives working the quarry actually tunneled into the mountain. Tools fashioned from stone quarried here have been found at archaeological sites across the northeastern United States.

== See also ==
- National Register of Historic Places listings in Coos County, New Hampshire
