= Nansen Ski Jump =

Ski jump in New Hampshire, United States

Nansen Ski Jump State Historic Site
- View of the Nansen Ski Jump from the south

- Location within New Hampshire
- Interactive map of Nansen Ski Jump State Historic Site
- Location: Milan, New Hampshire, United States
- Coordinates: 44°31′59″N 71°10′12″W
- Administrator: New Hampshire Division of Parks and Recreation
- Website: Official website
- New Hampshire State Parks
- Nansen Ski Jump
- U.S. National Register of Historic Places
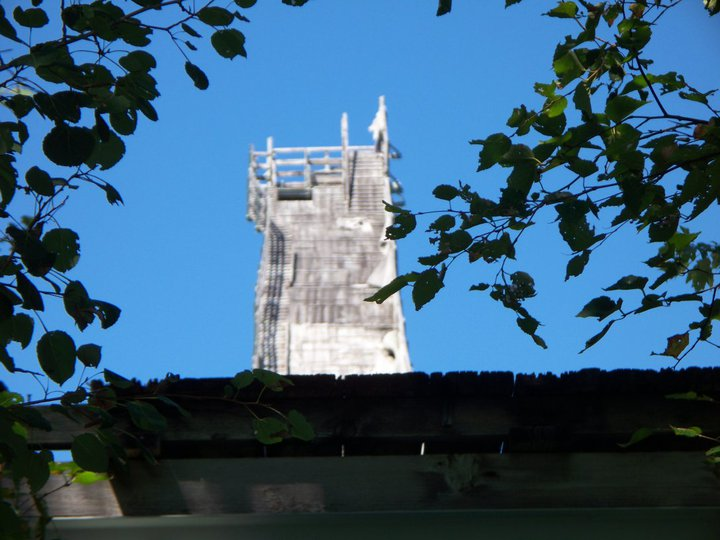
- Nansen Ski Jump before restoration, 2011
- Built: 1936
- Architect: John Barnard Nichol
- NRHP reference No.: 100004084
- Added to NRHP: June 20, 2019

Nansen Ski Jump, also known as The Big Nansen and The Sleeping Giant, is a ski jump located along Route 16 in Milan, New Hampshire. Built in 1936, it was the largest ski jump of its time. It is now within the Nansen Ski Jump State Historic Site, a New Hampshire state park, which also features a picnic area and boat launch on the Androscoggin River. Named for Norwegian explorer and humanitarian Fridtjof Nansen, the ski jump has been listed on the National Register of Historic Places.

== Description ==
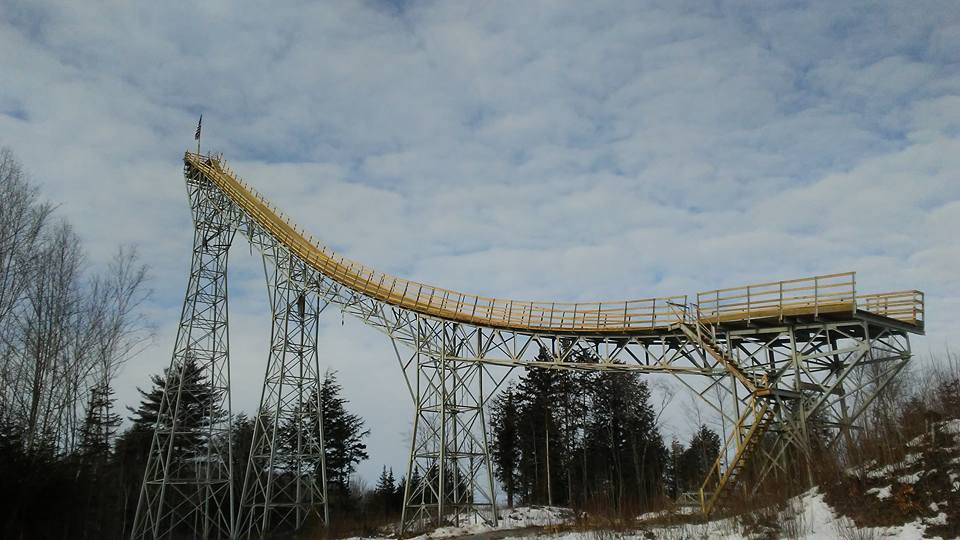
The jump in 2017, after a restoration funded by Red Bull

The Nansen Ski Jump is just north of the Berlin city line. It was constructed in 1936 by the city of Berlin and the National Youth Administration and was once the largest of its time. The ski jump has a 175.3-foot (53.4 m) steel frame and is 260 ft (79 m) in length. It has a 171.5-foot (52.3 m) tower, a 225-foot (69 m) vertical drop, and a descent angle of approximately 37.5 degrees. The jump is approximately a K-80 jump. However, the trestle and outrun hill do not conform to modern specifications.

== History ==
For almost fifty years this was the largest ski jump in the eastern United States and the foremost jump in the country. The architect of the ski jump was John Barnard Nichol, a resident of neighboring Berlin. The Nansen Ski Jump was the site of major championship ski jumping competitions. In 1938, the first Olympic trials were held at the Nansen Ski Jump.

The jump was closed in 1988. In November 2011, a New Hampshire historical marker (number 227) was placed to commemorate the ski jump. Over time the ski jump devolved into a state of disrepair. In 2015, brush clearing work was started as Phase 1 toward a goal of restoring the site so visitors can view it as it once was. The state of New Hampshire owns and manages the jumping facility as a state park.

In 2016 and 2017, repairs to the ski jump's decking were made by Knollstone Contracting of Bow, New Hampshire, in preparation for a celebratory jump by Olympian Sarah Hendrickson, which occurred early in the morning of March 4, 2017.

In January 2019, the state agreed to allow the Friends of Big Nansen to continue renovations of the jump and to hold ski jumping and other events at the site. In February 2019, it was announced that plans were underway to return competition ski jumping to the jump.
