= Dead River (New Hampshire) =

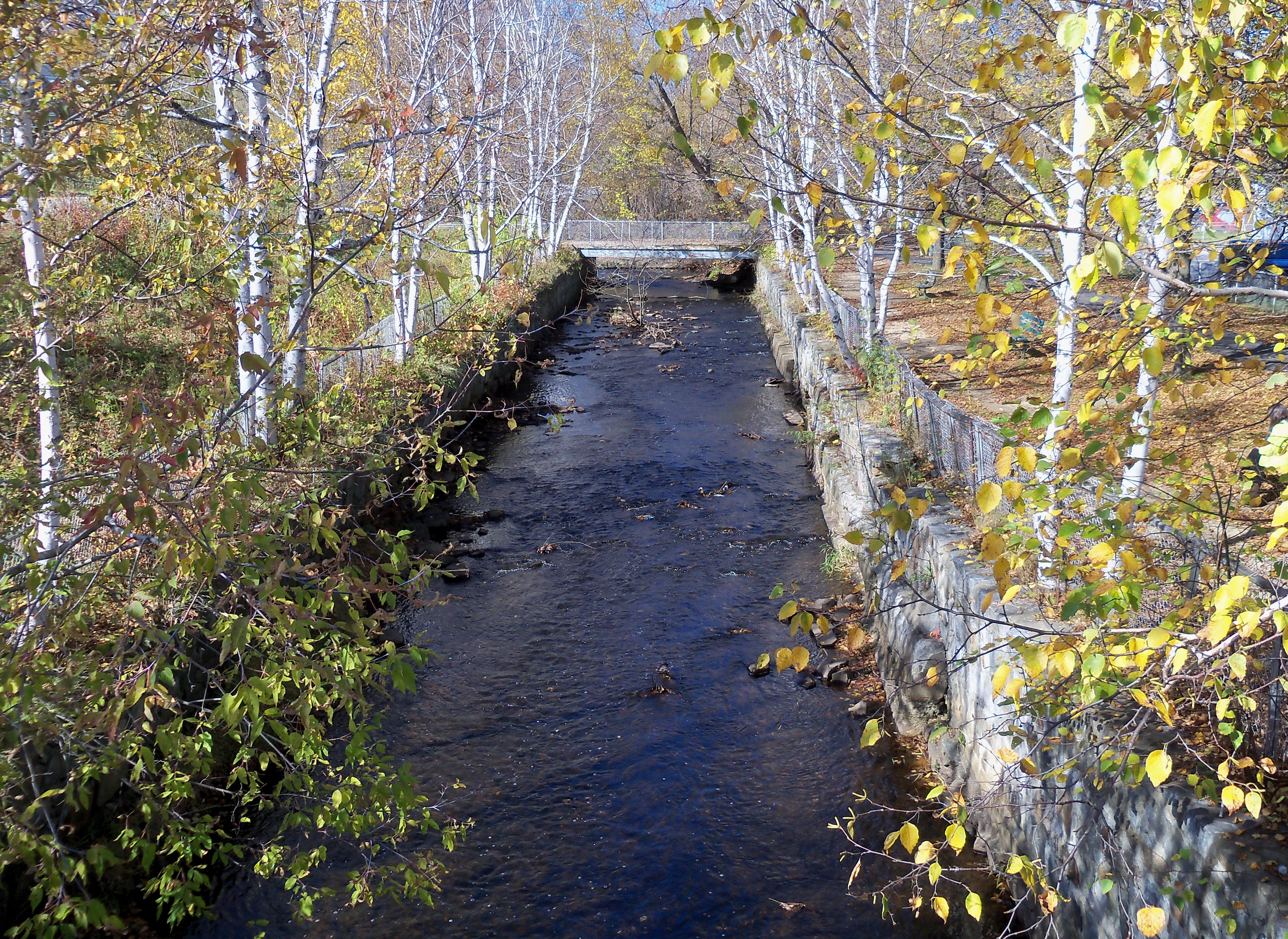
- Channelized portion of the Dead River near downtown Berlin

- Location within New Hampshire Location within the United States

Location
- Country: United States
- State: New Hampshire
- County: Coos
- City: Berlin

Physical characteristics
- Source: Jericho Brook
  - location: Berlin
  - coordinates: 44°29′51″N 71°13′15″W
  - elevation: 1,050 ft (320 m)
- Mouth: Androscoggin River
  - location: Berlin
  - coordinates: 44°27′58″N 71°10′57″W
  - elevation: 950 ft (290 m)
- Length: 3.5 mi (5.6 km)

The Dead River is a 3.5-mile-long (5.6 km) river located entirely within the city limits of Berlin, New Hampshire, in the United States. It is a tributary of the Androscoggin River, which flows south from Berlin before turning east at Gorham and into Maine, eventually joining the Kennebec River at Merrymeeting Bay. The Abenaki people called the Dead River Plumpetoosuc, which means "shallow, narrow river".

== Etymology ==
The earliest known document to specifically name the Dead River is the 1796 deed of sale by an Indian named Phillip, to Thomas Eames, John Bradly, Jonathan Eastman, and Nathan Hoit. The deed states, "... then up said Ammonoosuc River to Head Pond, then across the carrying place to a small pond on the head of the Plumpetussuck, or Dead River, then down said river to Andrewscoggin River [sic]..."

The name "Dead River" is thought to come from the fact that the river is flat, or "dead," as it travels through the valley before reaching the Androscoggin.

The Abenaki name for the river was Plumpetoosuc, which means "shallow, narrow river". An alternate meaning is given by Benjamin Williams, who in 1805 led an expedition up the Androscoggin. "Situated between a mountain and a small bluff in a valley at Mainsbourgh, to the west of the islands at the falls, lies a river in which the savages call Paumpalussauke which means 'place where the god of the waters dwells.' and it is because of this that they travel through here, but do not live here, in fear of this deity."

== History ==
Long before Europeans settled North America, Abenaki Indians used the Dead River to travel between the Androscoggin River valley and the Connecticut River valley. In later years, the Glen Manufacturing Company, later purchased by the International Paper Company, used the river to conduct log drives to get pulpwood to its mills located where the Smyth Hydro Park is today.

In recent years, local interest in the river and its history has been renewed by Berlin Community Development Director Pamela Laflamme and Pierre Lessard, after Lessard erected a sign reading "Plumpetoosuc River" on his property near the river. The pair are leaders in an effort to rename the river to its aboriginal name. The cause has also led to the cleanup of Memorial Place II, a 1.4-acre (0.57 ha) park referred to locally as "Dead River Park", after Amy Michaud noticed the park's neglected state and created a Facebook group called "Friends of Dead River Park".

== Course ==
The Dead River is formed where Jericho Brook, flowing out of the White Mountain National Forest and Jericho Mountain State Park from the west, reaches Little People's Pond at a broad, flat valley occupied by NH Route 110 and the St. Lawrence and Atlantic Railroad. Flowing southeast through the valley, the river is nearly flat, or "dead", until it reaches the center of Berlin, where it drops 40 feet (12 m) in 0.5 miles (0.80 km) to reach the Androscoggin.

== See also ==
- List of rivers of New Hampshire
