= Groton Wind Power Project =

Wind farm in Groton, New Hampshire, United States

Groton Wind
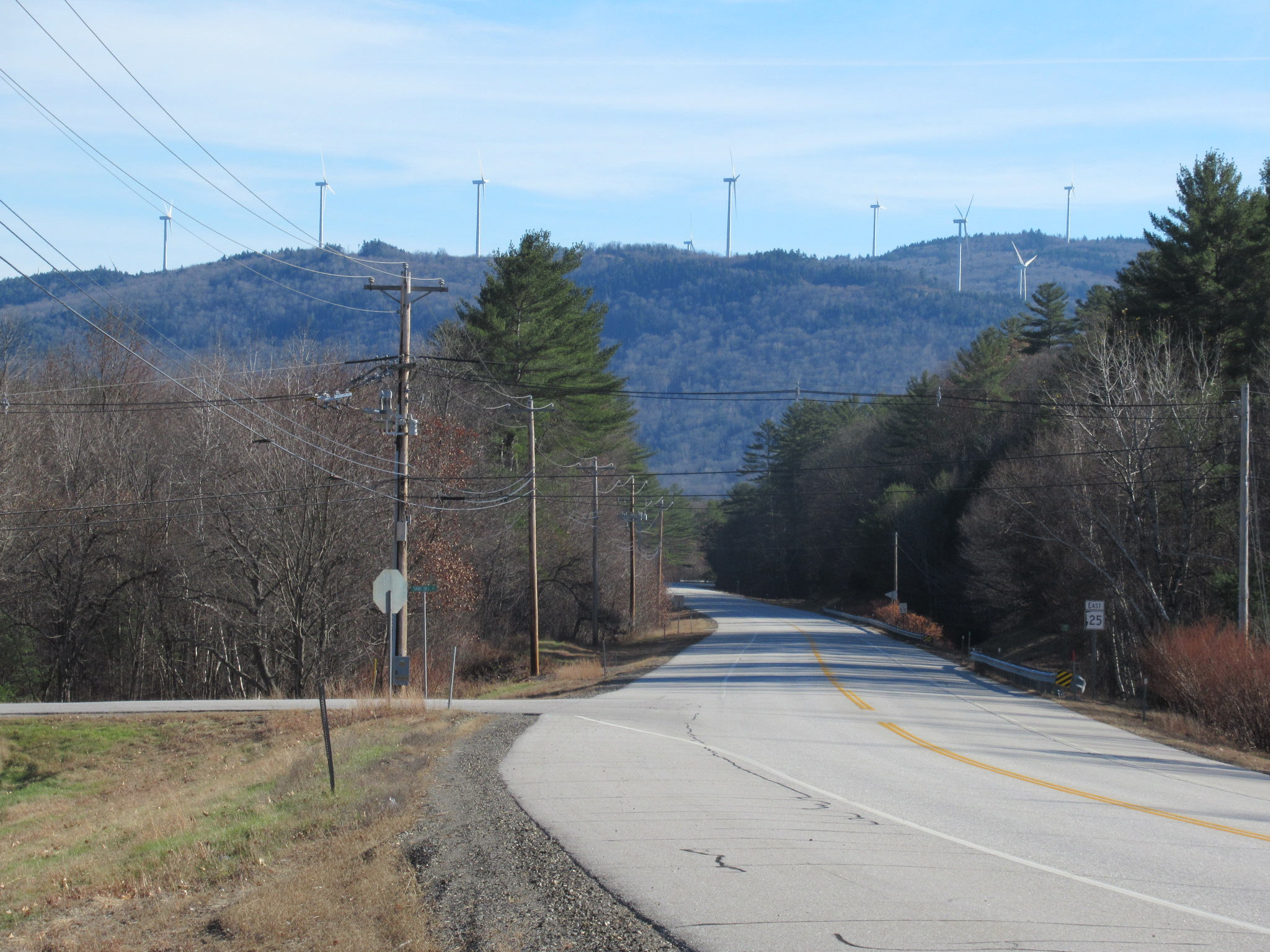
- Groton Wind towers at north end of Fletcher Mountain, viewed from NH 25
- Country: United States
- Location: Groton, New Hampshire
- Coordinates: 43°45′N 71°48′W
- Status: Operational
- Construction began: 2011
- Commission date: December 2012
- Construction cost: $120 million
- Owner: Iberdrola Renovables

Wind farm
- Type: Onshore
- Hub height: 78 metres (256 ft)
- Rotor diameter: 87 metres (285 ft)
- Site area: 4,180 acres

Power generation
- Units operational: 24
- Make and model: Gamesa: G87 2.0 MW
- Nameplate capacity: 48 MW
- Annual net output: 144 - 158 GWh

Groton Wind Power Project a 48-megawatt wind farm, also known as Groton Wind Farm, was constructed in 2012 in Groton, New Hampshire in the northeast United States. Owned by Iberdrola Renovables, it is the third major wind-power installation in the state of New Hampshire. Power is being sold to NSTAR under a power purchase agreement, and will go to the Boston area.

Located on Tenney Mountain and Fletcher Mountain in Groton, in Grafton County, it has 24 Gamesa G87, 2.0 MW turbines wind turbines. Delivery of turbine components began on June 25, 2012, and continued through August.
