= Berlin, New Hampshire =

- City
- Berlin, New Hampshire, from the southeast

- Seal
- Nicknames: The City That Trees Built; Paper City; Tansy Town; Hockey Town USA
- Motto: Your Adventure Starts Here
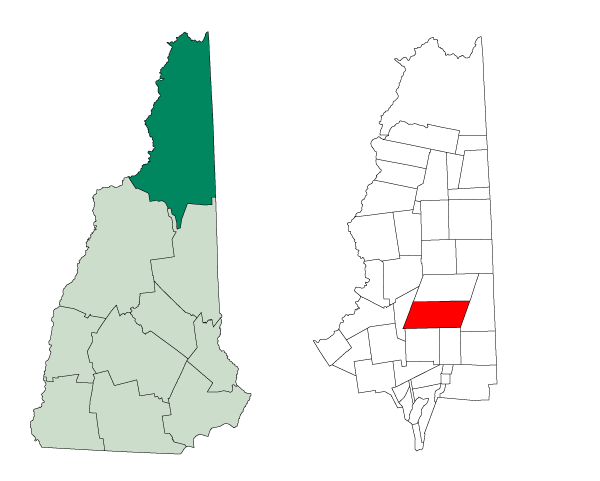
- Location in New Hampshire
- Coordinates: 44°29′13″N 71°15′36″W
- Country: United States
- State: New Hampshire
- County: Coös
- Town: 1829
- City: 1897

Area
  - Total: 62.20 sq mi (161.10 km^{2})
  - Land: 61.35 sq mi (158.89 km^{2})
  - Water: 0.85 sq mi (2.21 km^{2})
- Elevation: 1,431 ft (436 m)

Population (2020)
  - Total: 9,425
  - Density: 153.6/sq mi (59.32/km^{2})
- Time zone: UTC−5 (EST)
  - Summer (DST): UTC−4 (EDT)
- ZIP Code: 03570
- Area code: 603
- FIPS code: 33-05140
- GNIS feature ID: 873545
- Website: www.berlinnh.gov

Berlin (/ˈbɜːrlɪn/ BUR-lin) is the only city in Coös County, New Hampshire, United States. Located along the Androscoggin River, it is the northernmost city in New Hampshire. The population was 9,425 at the 2020 census, down from 10,051 at the 2010 census, and was estimated to be 9,502 in 2025.

It includes the village of Cascade in the south part of the city. Located in New Hampshire's Great North Woods Region or "North Country", Berlin sits at the edge of the White Mountains, and the city's boundaries extend into the White Mountain National Forest. Berlin is home to the Berlin and Coos County Historical Society's Moffett House Museum & Genealogy Center, Service Credit Union Heritage Park, the Berlin Fish Hatchery, and the White Mountains Community College, member of the Community College System of New Hampshire.

Berlin is the principal city of the Berlin Micropolitan Statistical Area, which includes all of Coös County, New Hampshire, and Essex County, Vermont. Because Quebec is less than 60 miles (100 km) away, Berlin has many people of French Canadian descent in its population. Around 65% of its residents speak a variant of New England French, which is known locally as "Berlin French".

The pronunciation of Berlin was changed to BUR-lin, instead of Ber-LIN (as in Berlin, Germany), during World War I as a patriotic stand against Germany.

== History ==
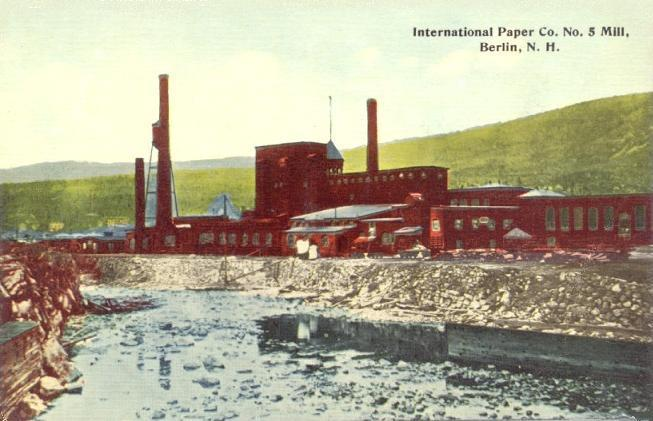
International Paper Mill, c. 1912

Green's Pond, 1888

Around 11,000 years ago, small groups of Native Americans camped around the area of what is now called Berlin. In later years, the Eastern Abenaki tribes came to Berlin to mine rhyolite in Mt. Jasper.

When English colonists came to America, Berlin was first granted on December 31, 1771, by Colonial Governor John Wentworth, as "Maynesborough" after Sir William Mayne. But the grantees did not take up their claims, which disappeared with the Revolution. In 1802, Seth Eames and Gideon Tirrell were sent by the descendants of Mayne to explore and mark lots for settlers, and still no one came. Maynesborough was settled in 1823–1824 by William Sessions and his nephew, Cyrus Wheeler. Both men were from Gilead, Maine. Farming was the first industry. With 65 inhabitants in 1829, the New England town was reincorporated on July 1 as Berlin with the help of Cyrus' father, Thomas Wheeler.

Situated in a heavily forested region, the community developed early into a center for logging and wood industries. Falls on the Androscoggin River provided water power for sawmills. In 1826, a road was built to Gorham by Thomas, Amos, and Daniel Green. In 1851, the St. Lawrence & Atlantic Railroad entered Berlin, connecting it to other markets. Acquiring water, timber, and rail rights in the early 1850s, the H. Winslow & Company built a large sawmill at the head of "Berlin Falls". In 1868, William Wentworth Brown and Lewis T. Brown bought a controlling interest in the business and changed its name to the Berlin Mills Company.

By 1885, the mill town was home to several pulp and paper mills, including the Riverside Mill, Forest Fibre Company and White Mountain Pulp & Paper Company. Because of the need for labor in the mills, immigrants arrived from Russia, Norway, Finland, Italy, Sweden, Ireland, and Germany. Many others were French Canadians from nearby Quebec.

In 1872, a group of Scandinavians founded the nation's oldest ski club, which still exists today. It was originally called the North American Ski Club (in Norwegian, Nordamerikansk Skiklubben), but later was renamed the Nansen Ski Club. This was in honor of Fridtjof Nansen, who in 1888 skied across Greenland. In 1897, Berlin was incorporated as a city, the northernmost in the state.

As of 1874, the Boston and Maine Railway passed through the eastern portion of the town and operated on this line until the 1980s. The old railroad bed has since been converted for usage as an ATV trail.

Berlin's main industry in the early 20th century was the pulp and paper industry, which subsequently entered a long period of decline. As jobs left the area, the population has decreased and is about half its peak of more than 20,000 in the 1930 census. In 1917, the Berlin Mills Company was renamed the Brown Company, because of World War I and anti-German feeling against the enemy of the time. A short time after the Great Depression, the Brown Company went into receivership. Surviving with governmental help, it was bought and sold several times after World War II.

In 2001, American Tissue filed for bankruptcy, before which it had stopped paying city taxes. Its facilities were purchased in 2002 by Fraser Papers of Canada. But in March 2006, Fraser Papers announced the closing of Berlin's pulp mill. On May 6, 2006, 250 employees were displaced, some moving to Cascade's paper finishing mill, but most were left unemployed.

On October 3, 2006, the North American Dismantling Corporation of Michigan announced that it had bought the 121-acre (49 ha) defunct pulp mill site of Fraser Paper, and would spend a year demolishing the property to allow redevelopment. Laidlaw Energy LLC has since purchased a portion of the former Fraser property, including a large recovery boiler which it intends to convert into a 66-megawatt biomass plant in 2010–2011.

In the 1990s, the local historian and author Paul "Poof" Tardiff began writing articles in The Berlin Daily Sun. He later collected these in a three-volume series titled Once Upon a Berlin Time, which documents local history. He continued to write articles for the newspaper every Tuesday and Thursday until his death in 2018.

Recent economic development has been based on the correctional industry. The 750-bed Northern New Hampshire Correctional Facility was built in 1999 and employs approximately 200 people. In 2012, the Federal Bureau of Prisons opened a federal, 1200-bed medium security facility, which employs approximately 350 people.

== Geography ==
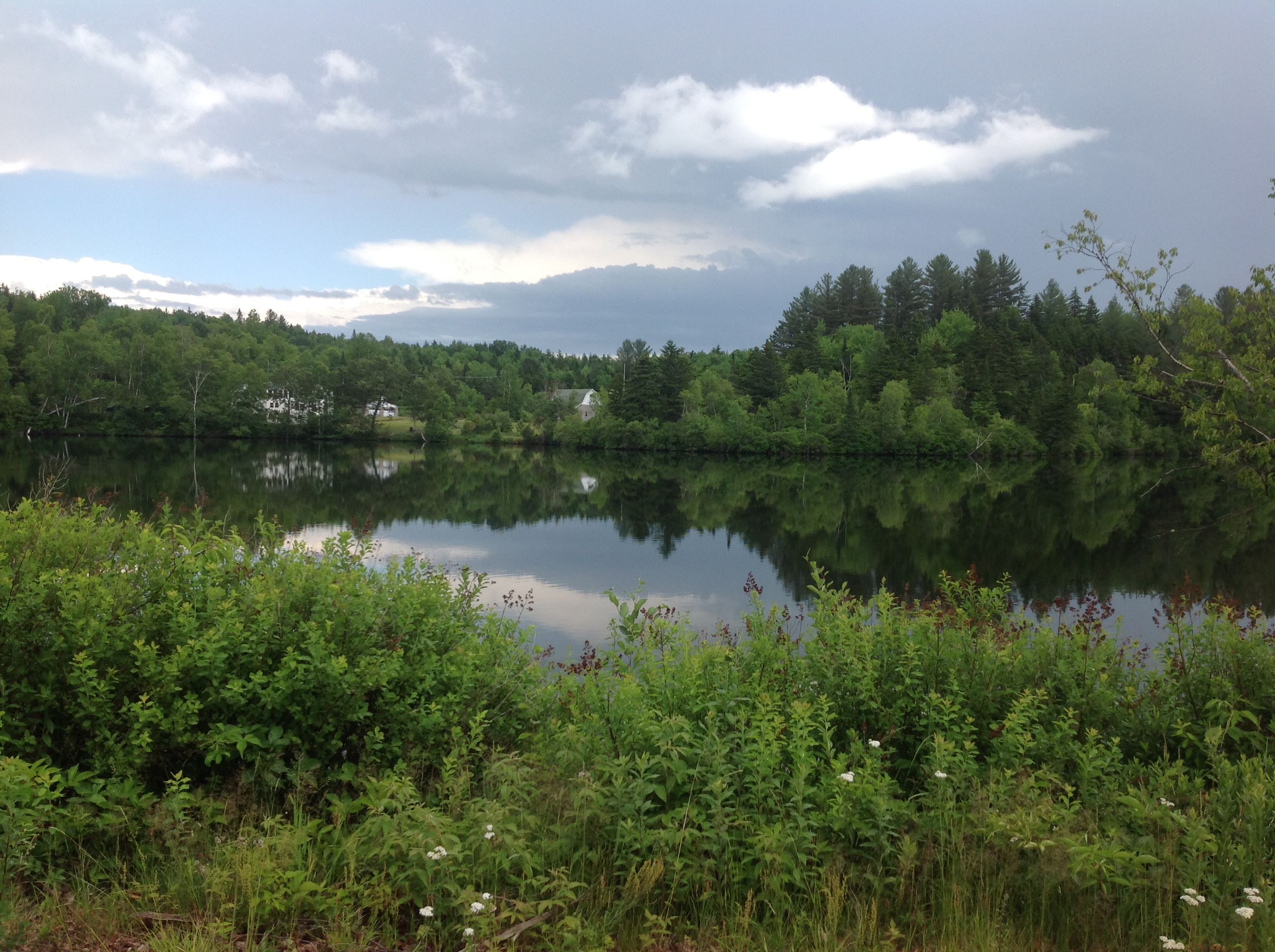
York Pond with the Berlin Fish Hatchery in the background

Berlin is located in northern New Hampshire, north of the White Mountains, in the state's North Country region.

According to the United States Census Bureau, the city has a total area of 62.2 square miles (161.1 km^{2}), of which 61.4 square miles (158.9 km^{2}) are land and 0.8 square miles (2.2 km^{2}) are water, comprising 1.37% of the city. Berlin is situated at the confluence of the Androscoggin and Dead rivers. The Mahoosuc Range is to the southeast. Jericho Mountain State Park, created from a city park and from private land in 2005, is west of the city center and features a reservoir created in the 1970s and a network of ATV trails. The city's highest point is Mount Weeks, at 3,901 feet (1,189 m) above sea level. A prominent feature in the landscape of Berlin is 2,031-foot (619 m) Mount Forist, rising over the west side of the city. Approximately half of Berlin lies within the Connecticut River watershed, and half lies in the Androscoggin River watershed.

=== Rivers ===
- Androscoggin River
- Dead River
- Upper Ammonoosuc River

=== Climate ===
Like all of northern New England, except the highest mountains, Berlin has a warm-summer humid continental climate (Köppen Dfb) characterized by cold, snowy winters and warm summers.

Climate data for Berlin, New Hampshire (1991–2020 normals; extremes 1886 to 1892 and since October 1917)
Month	Jan	Feb	Mar	Apr	May	Jun	Jul	Aug	Sep	Oct	Nov	Dec	Year
Record high °F (°C)	67 (19)	69 (21)	80 (27)	89 (32)	94 (34)	98 (37)	98 (37)	97 (36)	95 (35)	88 (31)	77 (25)	68 (20)	98 (37)
Mean maximum °F (°C)	51.0 (10.6)	50.8 (10.4)	58.8 (14.9)	76.7 (24.8)	84.6 (29.2)	88.6 (31.4)	88.8 (31.6)	87.0 (30.6)	84.1 (28.9)	75.3 (24.1)	65.4 (18.6)	53.1 (11.7)	90.8 (32.7)
Mean daily maximum °F (°C)	26.9 (−2.8)	29.7 (−1.3)	38.4 (3.6)	51.9 (11.1)	65.5 (18.6)	73.7 (23.2)	78.2 (25.7)	76.8 (24.9)	69.5 (20.8)	56.6 (13.7)	44.0 (6.7)	32.4 (0.2)	53.6 (12.0)
Daily mean °F (°C)	16.1 (−8.8)	18.0 (−7.8)	27.2 (−2.7)	40.6 (4.8)	53.0 (11.7)	61.9 (16.6)	66.5 (19.2)	64.7 (18.2)	57.4 (14.1)	45.9 (7.7)	34.9 (1.6)	23.3 (−4.8)	42.5 (5.8)
Mean daily minimum °F (°C)	5.4 (−14.8)	6.3 (−14.3)	16.0 (−8.9)	29.4 (−1.4)	40.6 (4.8)	50.1 (10.1)	54.9 (12.7)	52.5 (11.4)	45.2 (7.3)	35.1 (1.7)	25.7 (−3.5)	14.1 (−9.9)	31.3 (−0.4)
Mean minimum °F (°C)	−15.5 (−26.4)	−11.8 (−24.3)	−5.5 (−20.8)	17.9 (−7.8)	29.4 (−1.4)	37.9 (3.3)	45.9 (7.7)	42.0 (5.6)	32.1 (0.1)	24.1 (−4.4)	10.5 (−11.9)	−5.7 (−20.9)	−17.7 (−27.6)
Record low °F (°C)	−35 (−37)	−39 (−39)	−29 (−34)	−9 (−23)	18 (−8)	29 (−2)	33 (1)	31 (−1)	20 (−7)	8 (−13)	−13 (−25)	−44 (−42)	−44 (−42)
Average precipitation inches (mm)	2.73 (69)	2.44 (62)	3.00 (76)	3.43 (87)	3.55 (90)	4.23 (107)	4.08 (104)	3.75 (95)	3.35 (85)	4.92 (125)	3.39 (86)	3.73 (95)	42.60 (1,082)
Average snowfall inches (cm)	18.2 (46)	21.0 (53)	16.1 (41)	4.2 (11)	0.2 (0.51)	0.0 (0.0)	0.0 (0.0)	0.0 (0.0)	0.0 (0.0)	0.5 (1.3)	4.6 (12)	17.2 (44)	82.0 (208)
Average extreme snow depth inches (cm)	16.1 (41)	21.7 (55)	19.7 (50)	5.8 (15)	0.2 (0.51)	0.0 (0.0)	0.0 (0.0)	0.0 (0.0)	0.0 (0.0)	0.5 (1.3)	3.2 (8.1)	12.9 (33)	26.4 (67)
Average precipitation days (≥ 0.01 in)	10.2	9.1	10.0	10.5	12.1	12.3	11.8	10.3	9.3	11.7	10.2	12.2	129.7
Average snowy days (≥ 0.1 in)	7.6	6.6	5.3	1.9	0.1	0.0	0.0	0.0	0.0	0.4	2.6	7.3	31.8
Source: NOAA

== Demographics ==
Historical population
Census	Pop.	Note	%±
1830	73		—
1840	116		58.9%
1850	173		49.1%
1860	433		150.3%
1870	529		22.2%
1880	1,144		116.3%
1890	3,729		226.0%
1900	8,886		138.3%
1910	11,780		32.6%
1920	16,104		36.7%
1930	20,018		24.3%
1940	19,084		−4.7%
1950	16,615		−12.9%
1960	17,821		7.3%
1970	15,256		−14.4%
1980	13,084		−14.2%
1990	11,824		−9.6%
2000	10,331		−12.6%
2010	10,051		−2.7%
2020	9,425		−6.2%
U.S. Decennial Census

=== 2020 census ===
As of the 2020 census, Berlin had a population of 9,425. The median age was 45.3 years. 17.0% of residents were under the age of 18 and 21.8% of residents were 65 years of age or older. For every 100 females there were 112.5 males, and for every 100 females age 18 and over there were 113.2 males age 18 and over.

79.1% of residents lived in urban areas, while 20.9% lived in rural areas.

There were 3,988 households in Berlin, of which 21.5% had children under the age of 18 living in them. Of all households, 39.4% were married-couple households, 22.4% were households with a male householder and no spouse or partner present, and 28.9% were households with a female householder and no spouse or partner present. About 37.1% of all households were made up of individuals and 16.4% had someone living alone who was 65 years of age or older.

There were 4,714 housing units, of which 15.4% were vacant. The homeowner vacancy rate was 3.0% and the rental vacancy rate was 9.5%.

Racial composition as of the 2020 census
Race	Number	Percent
White	8,405	89.2%
Black or African American	437	4.6%
American Indian and Alaska Native	39	0.4%
Asian	67	0.7%
Native Hawaiian and Other Pacific Islander	1	0.0%
Some other race	51	0.5%
Two or more races	425	4.5%
Hispanic or Latino (of any race)	346	3.7%

=== 2010 census ===
As of the census of 2010, there were 10,051 people, 4,178 households, and 2,515 families residing in the town. There were 4,910 housing units, of which 732, or 14.9%, were vacant. The racial makeup of the town was 96.5% white, 0.8% African American, 0.4% Native American, 0.3% Asian, 0.0% Native Hawaiian or Pacific Islander, 0.2% some other race, and 1.8% from two or more races. 1.5% of the population were Hispanic or Latino of any race.

Of the 4,178 households, 25.8% had children under the age of 18 living with them, 43.2% were headed by married couples living together, 11.8% had a female householder with no husband present, and 39.8% were non-families. 33.3% of all households were made up of individuals, and 15.2% were someone living alone who was 65 years of age or older. The average household size was 2.18, and the average family size was 2.71. 955 city residents lived in group quarters rather than households.

In the city, 18.4% of the population were under the age of 18, 7.8% were from 18 to 24, 24.3% from 25 to 44, 29.4% from 45 to 64, and 20.0% were 65 years of age or older. The median age was 44.7 years. For every 100 females, there were 111.7 males. For every 100 females age 18 and over, there were 110.6 males.

=== Income and poverty ===
For the period 2011–2015, the estimated median annual income for a household was $35,523, and the median income for a family was $49,103. The per capita income for the town was $21,348. 20.3% of the population and 18.1% of families were below the poverty line. 34.3% of the population under the age of 18 and 11.0% of those 65 or older were living in poverty.

=== Population trends ===
The population of Berlin rose rapidly from 1880 through 1930. The population went from 1,144 in 1880 to 20,018 in 1930. A slow decline began after 1930, interrupted only by a temporary increase around 1960. From 1960 to 2020, Berlin's population decreased substantially.

In the 1930s, Berlin was at its peak for population and economic growth. The population in 1930 was over 20,000 people, the most the city has ever had. Main Street in downtown had many family-owned businesses which would attract many people in the city. The Nansen Ski Jump just north of the city limits in Milan was a highlight for Berlin. Built in 1936, it was the largest ski jump in the eastern United States for almost 50 years, until it closed in 1988. It was fully restored in the beginning of 2017.

=== Ancestry ===
First ancestries of Berlin residents, 2000
Ancestry		Total Respondents 9,079	Percentage of Total Respondents
	French Canadian	3,937	43.4%
	French	1,817	20.0%
	American	673	7.4%
Total		6,427	70.8%

== Arts and culture ==
=== Historic sites ===
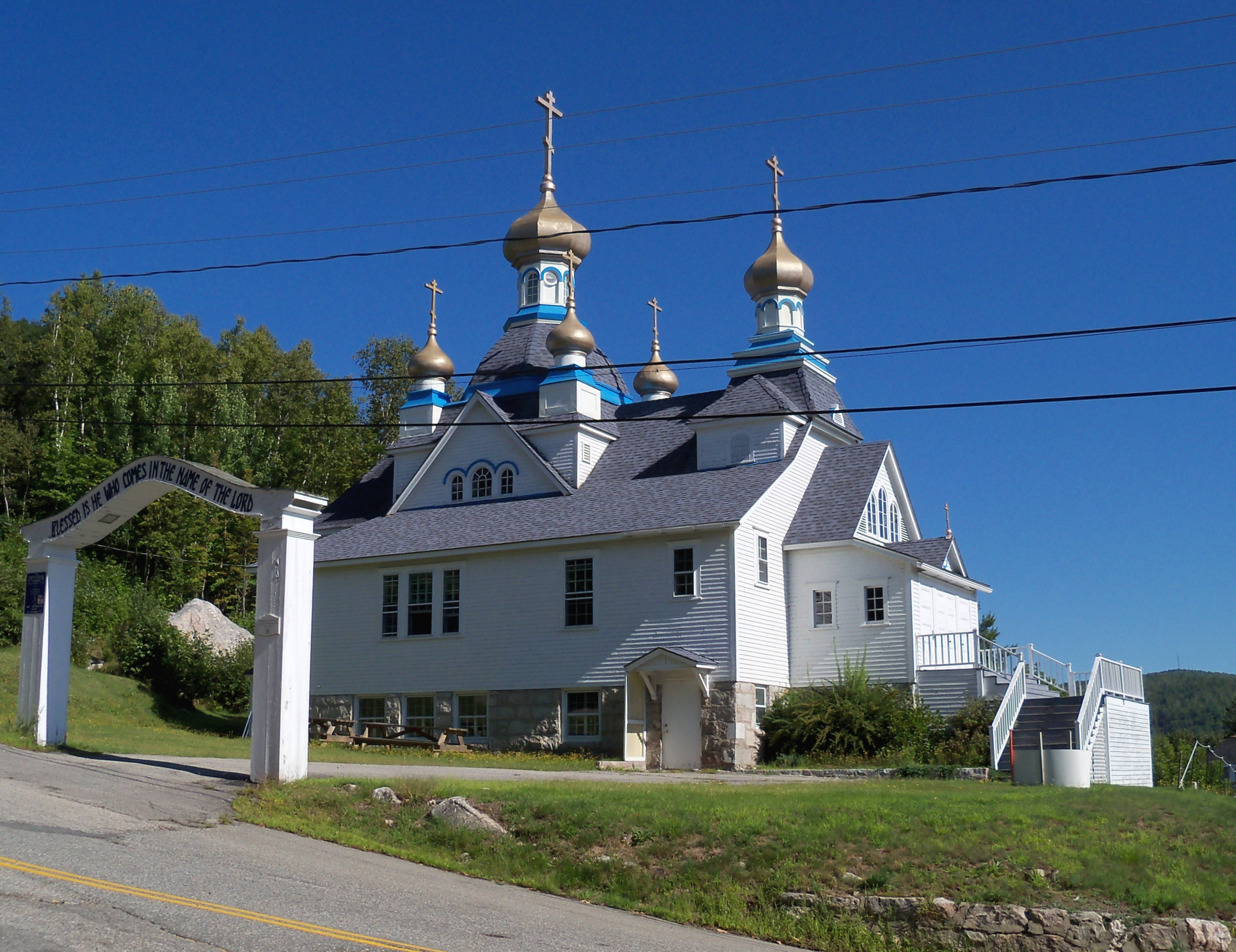
Holy Resurrection Orthodox Church

The following sites in Berlin are listed on the National Register of Historic Places:

- Congregational Church
- George E. Burgess School
- Holy Resurrection Orthodox Church
- Mt. Jasper Lithic Source
- St. Anne Church

=== Sites of interest ===
- Nansen Ski Jump
- The Berlin & Coös County Historical Society
- Moffett House Museum and Genealogical Center
- Notre Dame Arena
- Service Credit Union Heritage Park
- Jericho Mountain State Park

=== Inventions ===
Hiram A. Farrand with the Farrand Rapid Rule

The following items were created in Berlin:

- Bermico, a type of pipe that were produced by the Brown Company in the 1920s–1970s
- Cellulose floc, developed by the Brown Company
- Farrand Rapid Rule, created by Hiram A. Farrand, a tape measure later sold to Stanley Works
- Iron rigging, an object for skis made by Olaf Oleson and later sold to the Northland Ski Company of Minnesota
- Kream Krisp, a substance like Crisco created by the Brown Company, which led to lawsuit known as "Procter and Gamble vs. the Brown Company"
- Nibroc Paper Towels, developed by William E. Corbin and mass-produced by the Brown Company

=== Language and slang ===
Berlin was known for its unique French dialect as well as its Franglais vocabulary. In 2009, historical and contemporary Berlin slang was compiled into a self-published book, the Berlin Dictionary, with over seventy contributors.

== Sports ==
The city's Notre Dame Arena had a team in the low-level professional Federal Hockey League called the Berlin River Drivers from 2015 to 2017. In 2018, the Quebec-based Ligue Nord-Américaine de Hockey minor professional league added the Berlin BlackJacks, but the team was relocated to Saint-Jérôme, Quebec, by December 2018.

== Government ==
In the New Hampshire Senate, Berlin is included in the 1st District and is currently represented by Republican Erin Hennessey. In the New Hampshire House of Representatives, Berlin is included in the Coös 3rd District and is currently represented by Democrats Eamon Kelley, Larry Laflamme and Republican Robert Theberge. On the New Hampshire Executive Council, Berlin is in the 1st District and is represented by Republican Joseph Kenney. In the United States House of Representatives, Berlin is in New Hampshire's 2nd congressional district and is currently represented by Democrat Maggie Goodlander.

== Education ==
=== Public schools ===
Public education is managed by Berlin Public Schools. Schools include:

- Berlin Middle High School
- Berlin Elementary School

=== Higher education ===
- White Mountains Community College (member of the Community College System of New Hampshire)

== Media ==
=== Radio stations ===
- WKDR 1490 AM: classic hits and classic rock
- WMOU 1230 AM: hot adult contemporary (simulcast on 106.1 FM)
- WVMJ 98.1 FM: Top 40 (simulcast of 104.5 FM)

On June 3, 1922, a license was issued to the local Young Men's Christian Association for station WEAQ, the first radio broadcasting station licensed in New Hampshire. However, WEAQ apparently never made any broadcasts, and was deleted the following September.

=== Newspapers ===
- The Berlin Daily Sun
- The Berlin Reporter (1900–2024)

== Infrastructure ==
=== Law enforcement ===
Law enforcement is provided by the Berlin Police Department. The Berlin police station was completed in 1927, first serving as an armory for the New Hampshire Army National Guard.

The Berlin Police Department has 21 full-time officers, 17 part-time auxiliary/special enforcement officers, and ten civilian personnel. There is a communications specialist working dispatch at all times of the day.

=== Fire department ===
- Berlin Fire Department.

=== ATV/OHRV riding ===
Berlin allows any ATV/OHRV to ride on city streets. The Jericho Mountain ATV Festival occurs annually.

=== Transportation ===
The major roads serving Berlin are New Hampshire Routes 16 and 110. NH 16 connects Berlin with Gorham and eventually North Conway to the south, and with Milan and Errol to the north. NH 110 begins in downtown Berlin and travels northwest through West Milan and Stark, ending in Groveton.

Berlin serves as the northern terminus of the Berlin–Conway–New Hampton route of Concord Coach Lines.

Two airports are located nearby to Berlin, Berlin Regional Airport and Gorham Airport.

== Notable people ==
- Gaston Allaire (1916–2011), music educator and composer in Canada
- William Robinson Brown (1875–1955), corporate officer of the Brown Company and a noted horse breeder
- Robert N. Chamberlain (1856–1917), Speaker of the New Hampshire House of Representatives, second Chief Justice of the New Hampshire Superior Court
- James Gilbert Chandler (1856–1924), architect
- Jacalyn "Jackie" Cilley (born 1951), member of the New Hampshire House of Representatives, former state senator
- Lew Cody (1884–1934), actor during the 1920s and '30s
- William E. Corbin (1869–1951), inventor of the Nibroc paper towel
- Michael Durant (born 1961), U.S. Army Night Stalkers pilot, shot down and held prisoner after the Battle of Mogadishu
- Dennis "Red" Gendron (1957–2021), coach of three teams
- Odore Joseph Gendron (1921–2020), Bishop of Manchester
- Bruce Halle (1930–2018), founder of Discount Tire
- Selden "Sel" Hannah (1913–1991), ski area designer
- Norman Hansen (1924–2014), engineer, politician
- George Hawkins, victim of a bad skin graft that led to the celebrated "Hairy Hand" case of Hawkins v. McGee
- Ted Hodgdon (1902–1984), motorcycle journalist
- James H. Horne (1874–1959), athletic director and coach at Indiana University
- Archibald I. Lawrence (1869–1950), architect
- Albert E. Martel (?–1965), former government official
- Winston H. McCarty (1928–2025), member of the New Hampshire House of Representatives
- John Ramsey (1927–1990), public address announcer
- Elizabeth Raum (born 1945), Canadian oboist, composer
- Lowell Reed (1886–1966), co-creator of the Reed–Frost model; seventh president of Johns Hopkins University
- Joseph Royer (1884–1965), operatic baritone
- Earl Silas Tupper (1907–1983), inventor of Tupperware
- Bob Whitcher (1917–1997), pitcher with the Boston Braves during the 1945 season

== In popular culture ==
- Many scenes in the 1927 silent film The Masked Menace were shot in Berlin.
