= Granite Reliable Wind Farm =

Wind farm in New Hampshire, United States

- Country: United States
- Location: Coos County, New Hampshire
- Coordinates: 44°47′N 71°19′W
- Status: Operational
- Construction began: February 2011
- Commission date: December 2011
- Owner: Brookfield Renewable

Wind farm
- Type: Onshore

Power generation
- Units operational: 33
- Make and model: Vestas: V90-3.0 MW
- Nameplate capacity: 99 MW

Granite Reliable Wind Farm is a 99-megawatt wind farm, opened in 2011 in Millsfield and Dixville, New Hampshire, in the northeast United States. Owned by Brookfield Renewable, it is the second major wind-power installation in the state of New Hampshire. Most of the electricity generated will be sold to utilities in Vermont, Central Vermont Public Service and Green Mountain Power. Power from the wind turbines is connected through three 34.5 kV lines to a substation and from there through a 115 kV line. The wind farm was constructed by Madison, Wisconsin-based RMT Inc.

Located in Millsfield and Dixville, in Coos County, it has 33 V90-3.0 MW Vestas turbines wind turbines, in four sections, with seven wind turbines on Dixville Peak, eight located on Mount Kelsey, six on Owlhead Mountain, and 12 wind turbines along Fishbrook Ridge. It was originally developed by Noble Energy, and sold to Brookfield.
