= List of ghost towns in New Hampshire =

This is an incomplete list of ghost towns in New Hampshire, United States.

== Classification ==
Barren Site

- Site no longer in existence
- Sites that have been destroyed
- Covered with water
- Reverted to pasture
- May have a few difficult to find foundations/footings at most

Neglected Site

- Only rubble left
- All buildings uninhabited
- Some buildings or houses standing, but majority are roofless

Abandoned Site

- Building or houses still standing
- Buildings or houses largely abandoned
- Few residents
- Many abandoned buildings
- Small population

Historic Community

- Building or houses still standing
- Still a busy community
- Smaller than its boom years
- Population has decreased dramatically, to one fifth or less.

== Ghost Towns ==
Name	County	Current Status	Population (2020)	Notes
Alderbrook	Grafton County	Barren	0	An old logging camp in Bethlehem, started by H.C. Libbey and his sawmill.
Amoskeag	Hillsborough County	Neglected	0	A village and company in Manchester.
Atkinson and Gilmanton Academy Grant	Coös County	Barren	0	An uninhabited grant along the northern Maine border.
Bailey's Camp	Coös County	Barren	0	A small temporary logging camp in Jefferson.
Bean's Grant	Coös County	Barren	0	A grant given to Charles Bean of Maine.
Bean's Purchase	Coös County	Barren	0	A land parcel sold to Alpheus Bean.
Beebe River	Grafton County	Historic	0	A model utopian community near Campton and Sandwich.
Blood	Hillsborough County	Historic	0	An obscure defunct place in Nashua.
Canterbury Shaker Village	Merrimack County	Historic	0	The first Shaker settlement in New Hampshire.
Carrigain	Carroll County	Barren	0	An old company-owned logging town.
Chandler's Purchase	Coös County	Barren	0	A land parcel sold to Jeremiah Chandler.
Charleston	Grafton County	Barren	0	An old mining village, located north and east of Lake Tarleton.
Chickenboro	Grafton County	Historic	0	A small farming hamlet in Campton.
Crawford's Purchase	Coös County	Barren	0	A land grant sold to Thomas and Nathaniel Abbot, and Ethan Allen Crawford.
Cutt's Grant	Coös County	Barren	0	A land grant given to Thomas Cutts of Maine.
Dix's Grant	Coös County	Barren	0	Formerly part of Dixville township.
Dundee	Carroll County	Abandoned	0	A small Conway logging camp.
Draperville	Sullivan County	Neglected	0	A bobbin mill town south of Eastman Lake.
East Weare	Hillsborough County	Submerged	0	Submerged under the Everett Lake
Elbow Pond Community	Grafton County	Barren	0	A private cottage community near Elbow Pond in Woodstock.
Enfield Shaker Village	Grafton County	Historic	0	Located on the shore of Mascoma Lake.
Everett	Hillsborough County	Historic	0	A small locale near the Everett Lake.
Fessenden	Hillsborough County	Historic	0	A small locale also near the Everett Lake.
Franconia Iron Works	Grafton County	Neglected	0	Famed for having the Franconia Iron Furnace.
Gale River	Grafton County	Barren	0	A logging hamlet in Bethlehem.
Gosport	Rockingham County	Historic	0	A fishing village on Star Island in Rye.
Green's Grant	Coös County	Barren	0	A land grant given to Lt. Francis Green, a Bostonian.
Hadley's Purchase	Coös County	Barren	0	A land grant sold to Henry G. Hadley.
Hazen	Coös County	Neglected	0	A farming hamlet in Whitefield, founded by Louis and Lucius Hazen.
Jericho	Carroll County	Historic	0	A historic logging camp in Glen village in Jackson.
Jonesville	Carroll County	Historic	0	Another logging camp, located above Jericho.
Johnson	Grafton County	Neglected	0	A logging town started by George Johnson.
Kidderville	Coös County	Historic	0	A small village in Colebrook, wiped out by a 1929 flood.
Kilkenny	Coös County	Barren	0	A logging and mining township that peak at 27 inhabitants.
Lewisville	Carroll County	Historic	0	A logging camp near Bear Notch Road.
Little Canada	Grafton County	Abandoned	0	Edward Matson's flooring company hamlet.
Livermore	Grafton County	Abandoned	2	New Hampshire's most famous abandoned town.
Low and Burbank's Grant	Coös County	Barren	0	A land parcel bought by Clovis Lowe and Barker Burbank.
Martin's Location	Coös County	Barren	0	A land grant near Gorham.
Monson	Hillsborough County	Abandoned	0	The state's first inland colonial settlement, founded and abandoned in the 1700s.
Nash & Sawyer's Location	Coös County	Historic	0	A land grant in Carroll where Bretton Woods and Fabyans are located today.
Notchland	Carroll County	Historic	0	A small hamlet in Hart's Location.
Paris/Crystal	Coös County	Historic	0	Located in Stark and Dummer. Stark's portion is called "Crystal".
Passaconaway	Carroll County	Abandoned	0	A small logging village near Conway.
Pattenville	Grafton County	Submerged	0	A hamlet in Littleton submerged under the Moore Reservoir.
Peeling	Grafton County	Barren	0	The original Woodstock settlement atop Mount Cilley.
Pike	Grafton County	Neglected	0	A hamlet in Haverhill based around a defunct manufacturing industry.
Pinkham's Grant	Coös County	Barren	0	The site of Pinkham Notch.
Priscilla Brook	Coös County	Barren	0	A small logging camp in Kilkenny township.
Quinttown	Grafton County	Neglected	0	A defunct hill farming hamlet in Orford, near Orfordville.
Redstone Granite Quarry	Carroll County	Abandoned	0	A granite mining operation in the village of Redstone in Conway.
Richardson	Hillsborough County	Historic	0	A locale between Milford and Wilton.
Sandwich Notch	Carroll County	Neglected	0	A 19th century hill farming hamlet in Sandwich.
Sargent	Hillsborough County	Historic	0	A small hamlet south of the Everett Lake.
Sargent's Purchase	Coös County	Barren	0	The land grant where Mount Washington's summit is.
Scythevillage	Grafton County	Historic		A scythe making village in Littleton.
Second College Grant	Coös County	Barren	0	The second grant to Dartmouth College, after Clarksville.
Snackity	Strafford County	Barren	0	A small farming hamlet near Blue Job Mountain.
Old Hill Village	Merrimack County	Submerged	0	The original town of Hill, submerged under the Franklin Falls Reservoir.
Thompson and Meserve's Purchase	Coös County	Barren	1	A land grant sold to George P. Meserve and Samuel W. Thompson.
Thornton Gore	Grafton County	Abandoned	0	A small farming and milling hamlet in northern Thornton.
Tirrell Hill	Hillsborough County	Historic	0	A small locale in Goffstown.
True Francestown	Hillsborough County	Neglected	0	The original Francestown town center.
Waumbeck Junction	Coös County	Barren	0	A railroad junction and hamlet near Cherry Pond.
Wentworth Location	Coös County	Barren	28	A land grant given to George Wentworth of Portsmouth.
Whitcherville	Grafton County	Neglected	0	A small farming hamlet near Whitcher Hill in Easton.
Wildwood	Grafton County	Abandoned	0	A logging village in Easton, along the Wild Ammonoosuc River.
Willowdale Settlement	Grafton County	Barren	0	A small logging hamlet that succumbed to a series of fires.
Wilson Tavern	Hillsborough County	Historic	0	A small, obscure hamlet with no known exact location.
Zealand	Coös County	Neglected	0	A logging town founded by James Everell Henry, now located within Carroll.

== See also ==
- Defunct placenames of New Hampshire
- New Milford, New Hampshire, a fictional ghost town, created as a hoax
- New Hampshire historical markers:
  - No. 9: Stone Iron Furnace
  - No. 15: Shaker Village
  - No. 124: Amoskeag Mills
  - No. 143: East Weare Village
  - No. 162: New Hill Village
  - No. 185: Willowdale Settlement
  - No. 198: Alderbrook
  - No. 200: Wildwood
  - No. 202: The Enfield Shakers
  - No. 233: Zealand and James Everell Henry
