= Great North Woods Region (New Hampshire) =

Region of the United States

Coordinates: 44.69°N 71.3°W

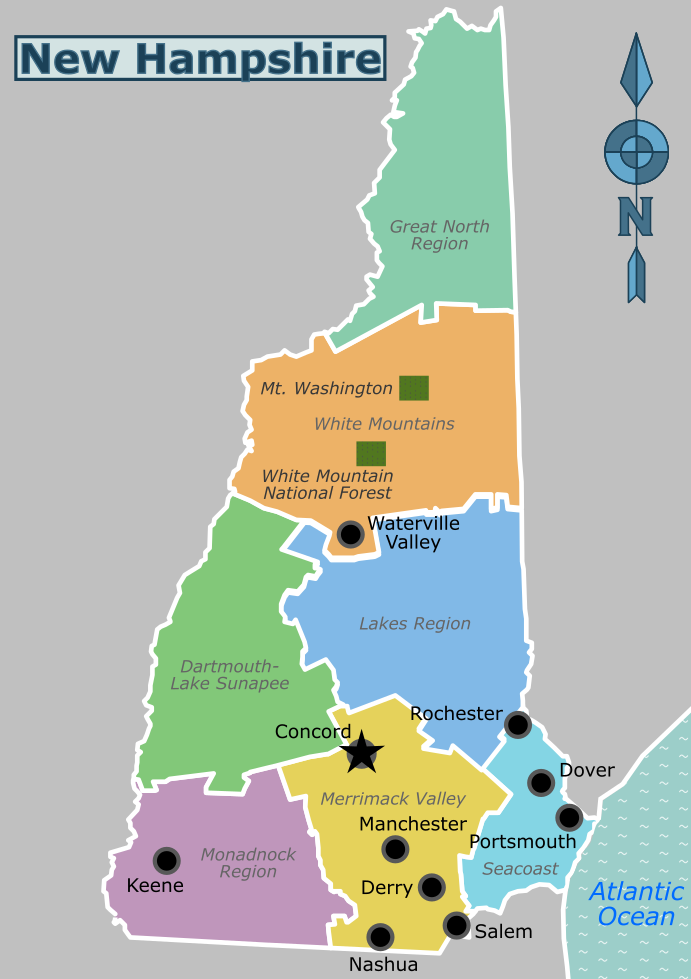
In this 2018 map by the N.H. Department of Transportation, the Great North Woods region is located at the northern tip of New Hampshire, colored blue-green in this map.

The Great North Woods Region, also known as the North Country, is located at the northern tip of New Hampshire, United States, north of the White Mountains Region and is part of the larger Great North Woods. The Great North Woods is a tourism region of New Hampshire and is located in Coos County. The dividing line is loosely defined as running from Cushman, a hamlet within Dalton, to south of Berlin and east to the Maine border, roughly following US Route 2.

The region has around 30,000 permanent residents. Berlin is the largest community in the sparsely populated region by a sizable margin, with more than one-third of the population of the region. Lancaster, the county seat, is the second largest community. Of the remaining communities in the region, only Milan, Colebrook, and Northumberland have more than 1,000 people.

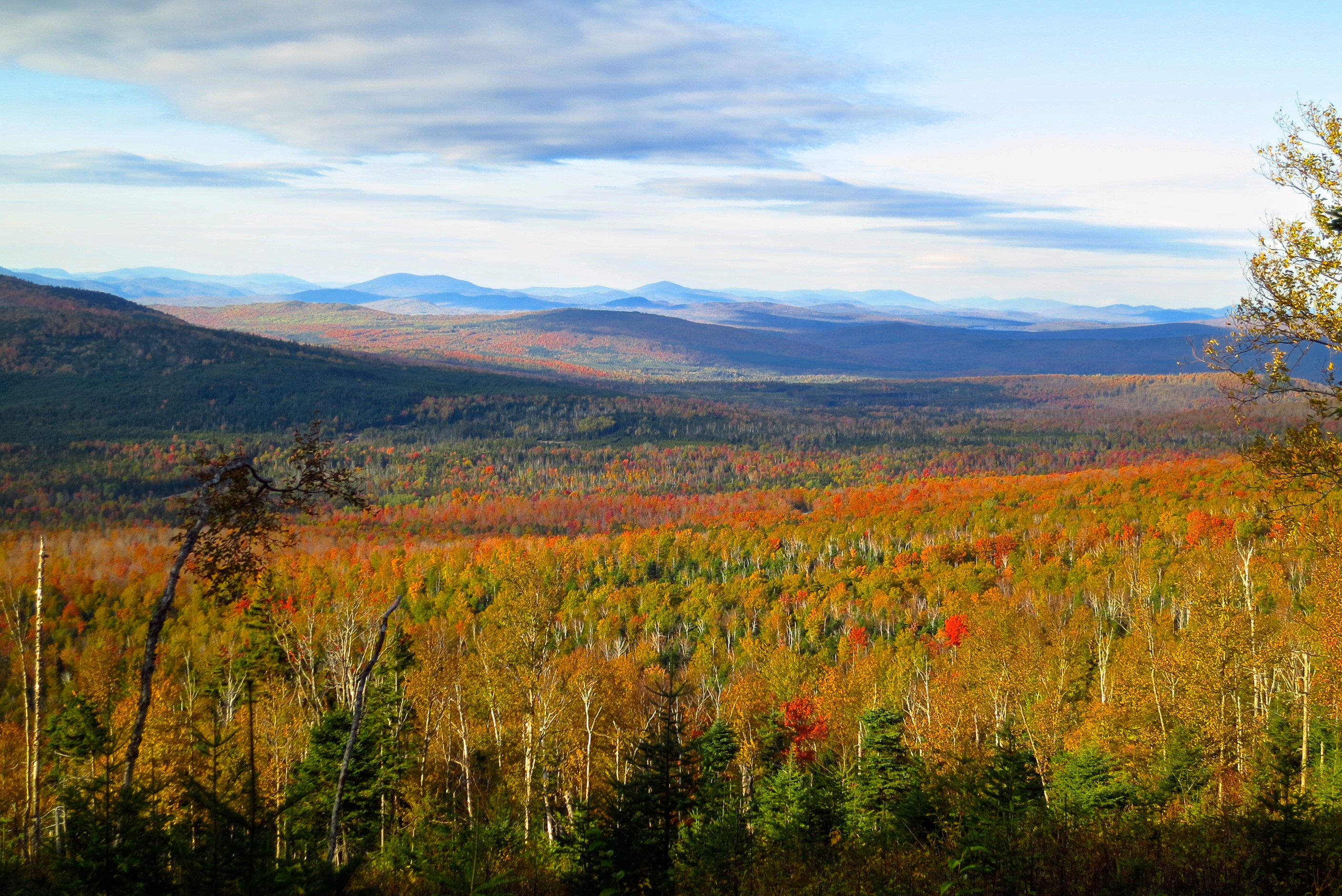
Great North Woods

Tourism marketing for the region is provided by New Hampshire Grand, the official convention and visitors' bureau for the region, as well as the Androscoggin Valley Chamber of Commerce, the Northern Gateway Chamber of Commerce, the Umbagog Area Chamber of Commerce, North Country Chamber of Commerce, and Great North Woods Region. Unlike the more commercially developed White Mountains Region to the south, most of the tourism in the Great North Woods centers around backcountry hiking and camping, as well as outdoor sports such as fishing and hunting. The central portion of the region is part of the White Mountains National Forest, including the Pilot Range and Mount Cabot, the highest peak of the Great North Woods. North of the Pilot Range is the Nash Stream State Forest. The Connecticut Lakes, headwaters of the Connecticut River, lie at the northern tip of the region.

The main industries aside from tourism are logging and paper manufacture, centered on Berlin.

There are no major freeways; nearly all roads outside of the few population centers are two-lane state highways. US Route 3 in the west along the Connecticut River and, in the east, New Hampshire Route 16 along the border with Maine provide the main north–south routes, while east–west traffic follows US Route 2, New Hampshire Route 110 and New Hampshire Route 26.

== See also ==
- New Hampshire Historical Marker No. 173: Lake Coos and the Presidential Range
