= The Bulge =

Mountain located in Coos County, New Hampshire

Highest point
- Elevation: 3940+ feet (1201+ m) NGVD 29
- Prominence: 220 ft (67 m)
- Listing: #72 New England 100 Highest
- Coordinates: 44°30.88′N 71°24.49′W

Geography
- Location: Kilkenny, Coos County, New Hampshire
- Parent range: Pilot Range
- Topo map: USGS Stark

The Bulge is a mountain located in Coos County, New Hampshire. The mountain is part of the Pilot Range of the White Mountains. The Bulge is flanked to the northeast by The Horn, and to the southwest by Mount Cabot.

The Bulge stands within the watershed of the Connecticut River, which drains into Long Island Sound in Connecticut. The southeast face of The Bulge drains into the headwaters of the West Branch of the Upper Ammonoosuc River, a tributary of the Connecticut River. The north face of The Bulge drains north, thence into the West Branch of Mill Brook, and into the Upper Ammonoosuc. The west face of The Bulge drains into Fox Brook, thence into Whipple Brook, Burnside Brook, Otter Brook, and the Israel River, another tributary of the Connecticut.

== See also ==
- List of mountains in New Hampshire
- White Mountain National Forest
- New England Hundred Highest
