= White Mountains Region =

Tourist region of New Hampshire

Coordinates: 44°08′00″N 71°33′00″W

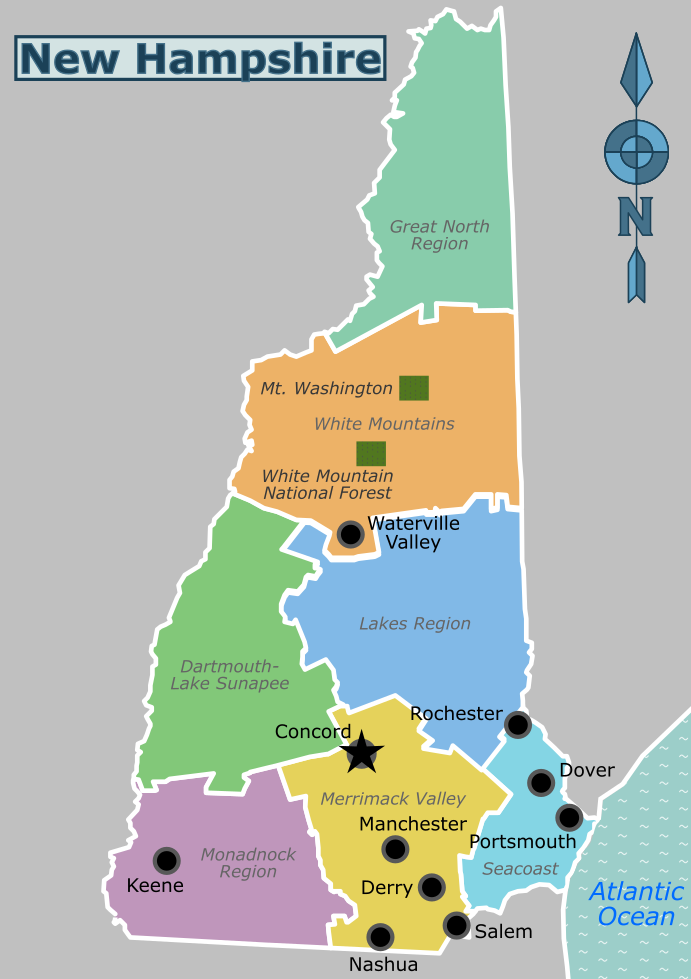
In this 2018 map by the N.H. Department of Transportation, the White Mountains region is located in the north-central portion of New Hampshire, colored orange in this map.

The White Mountains Region is a tourism region designated by the New Hampshire Division of Travel and Tourism. It is located in northern New Hampshire in the United States and is named for the White Mountains, which cover most of the region. The southern boundary of the region begins at Piermont on the west, and runs east to Campton, then on to Conway and the Maine border. The northern boundary begins at Littleton and runs east to Gorham and the Maine border. The region to the north is known as the Great North Woods Region, which should not be confused with the larger and more general Great North Woods.

The region includes the southern part of Coos County and northern sections of Grafton County and Carroll County.

Important settlements in the region include:

- Littleton
- Whitefield
- Bethlehem
- Gorham
- North Conway
- Conway
- Lincoln
- Campton

The region is bisected into east and west portions by Interstate 93 (from Campton to Littleton). Other major highways in the region include U.S. Highway 302 (Woodsville to Conway), New Hampshire State Route 16 (from Gorham to Conway), State Route 10 (from Littleton to Piermont), and U.S. Route 2 from Lancaster to Shelburne. U.S. Route 3 parallels I-93, except north of Franconia Notch, where it branches off to Twin Mountain and Whitefield.

The Cohos Trail and Appalachian Trail both traverse the White Mountains region.

== Highlights ==
Highlights in the region include:

- Outdoor recreation in the White Mountain National Forest
- United States Forest Service Ranger Stations in Bethlehem, Gorham and Conway
- Mount Washington State Park, Cog Railway, Auto Road, Observatory
- Mount Washington Valley region, including the towns and villages of Conway, North Conway, Intervale, Glen, Jackson, Bartlett, Hart's Location, Albany, Eaton, Effingham, Freedom, Madison, Tamworth, and Ossipee
- Franconia Notch State Park, featuring the site of the natural rock outcropping known as the Old Man of the Mountain, which crumbled and fell in early May 2003
- Forest Lake State Park, Crawford Notch State Park, Moose Brook State Park, Pinkham Notch Scenic Area
- Alpine skiing at seven or more major downhill ski area and seven cross-country skiing areas for ski touring
- Mount Washington Regional Airport, aka, White Mountain Regional Airport
- Covered bridges in Littleton, Woodsville, Bartlett, Jackson and Lincoln, among others
- Water sports on the Connecticut River from Littleton to Piermont
- Saco River, Swift River
- The scenic Kancamagus Highway from Lincoln to Conway
- Golf in Bethlehem, Whitefield, Jefferson, Jackson, North Conway, Bretton Woods
- Several amusement- or theme parks, in Jefferson, Lincoln, North Conway
- Information centers in Lincoln, Campton, North Conway, Littleton (Moore Station) and Gorham

== See also ==
- Presidential Range
