= Kilkenny, New Hampshire =

Township in Coos County, New Hampshire, United States

- Township
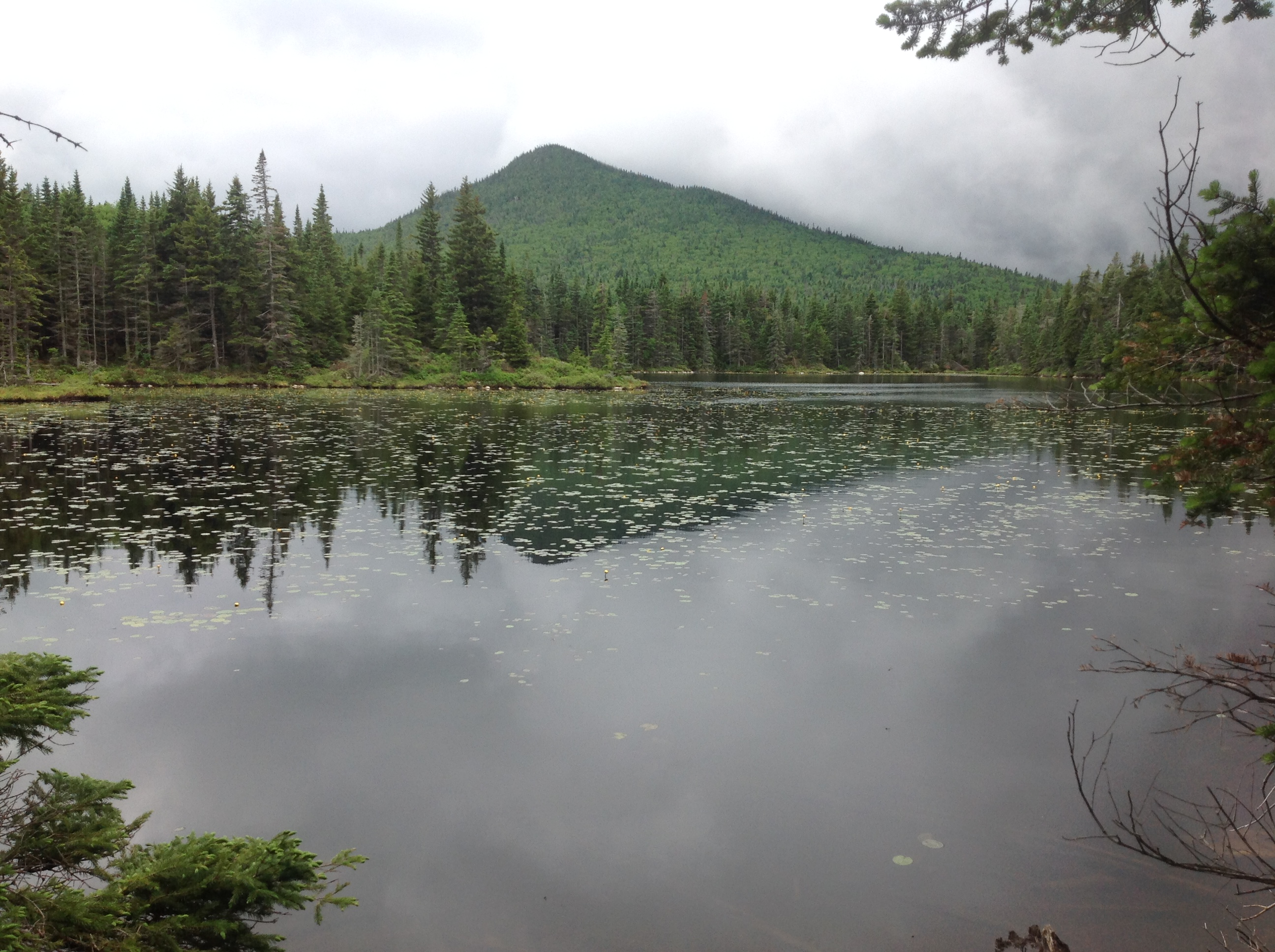
- Unknown Pond with The Horn in the background, both of which are popular hiking destinations within the township.

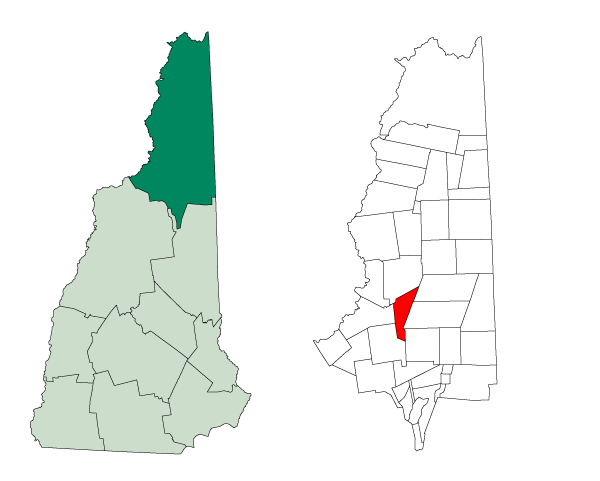
- Location in Coös County, New Hampshire
- Coordinates: 44°30′24″N 71°23′56″W
- Country: United States
- State: New Hampshire
- County: Coös

Area
  - Total: 25.70 sq mi (66.56 km^{2})
  - Land: 25.68 sq mi (66.51 km^{2})
  - Water: 0.019 sq mi (0.05 km^{2}) 0.08%
- Elevation: 3,160 ft (960 m)

Population (2020)
  - Total: 0
- Time zone: UTC-5 (Eastern)
  - Summer (DST): UTC-4 (Eastern)
- Area code: 603
- FIPS code: 33-007-39940
- GNIS feature ID: 873637

Kilkenny is a township in Coös County, New Hampshire, United States. It lies entirely within the White Mountain National Forest. As of the 2020 census, the township had a population of zero and was also estimated to be zero in 2025.

In New Hampshire, locations, grants, townships (which are different from towns), and purchases are unincorporated portions of a county which are not part of any town and have limited self-government (if any, as many are uninhabited).

== History ==
The town was granted to Jonathan Warner and others on June 4, 1774, containing 26,911 acres (108.90 km^{2}). In 1840 it contained 19 inhabitants, and in 1856 it had 19 inhabitants and an area of 15,906 acres (64.37 km^{2}), with a value of $20,000. It was named after the town and county of Kilkenny in Ireland.

Kilkenny once included a large portion of what is now the eastern edge of Jefferson, tapering south into the area of Jefferson Notch at the foot of Mount Mitten. This included much of the area known as "Jefferson Highland" on the Portland Road (present-day U.S. Route 2). By the 1870s, maps were showing the southern edge of Kilkenny as a line extending the border between Jefferson and Lancaster. The 1896 topographic map, however, shows that the boundary had again been adjusted several miles south, to include Mount Waumbek and Pliny Mountain, uninhabited areas. Deeds in this area often refer to the "Kilkenny Addition".

On the 1935 topographic map, the "Upper Ammonoosuc Trail" crossed Kilkenny along Priscilla Brook and through the pass from the Keenan Brook area of Randolph, north of Pliny Mountain. This trail has since been abandoned, although a 2002 atlas of New Hampshire shows a "Priscilla Brook Trail" in the same location.

The Willard Bowl north of Mount Waumbek, drained by Garland Brook, was considered as a site for development of a ski area in 1971, when it was owned by former governor Hugh Gregg. On the 1896 topographic map, there was a B&M railroad spur up much of Garland Brook, to an elevation of 2,100 feet (640 m). By 1935, the tracks were gone.

== Geography ==
According to the United States Census Bureau, the township has a total area of 25.7 square miles (66.6 km^{2}), of which 0.02 square miles (0.05 km^{2}), or 0.08%, are water.

Kilkenny is home to Mount Waumbek of the Pliny Range and Mount Cabot of the Pilot Range, each over 4,000 feet (1,200 m) high (see Four-thousand footers), as well as several other peaks over 3,000 feet (910 m). The summit of Mount Cabot is the highest point in Kilkenny, at 4,160 feet (1,270 m) above sea level. The township is entirely within the Connecticut River watershed. The southern end of the township, as well as the west side of the Pilot Range, drain west via Fox Brook, Bunnell Brook, Garland Brook, and Priscilla Brook to the Israel River, which joins the Connecticut at Lancaster, while the northern end of the township, including the east side of the Pilot Range and its north end, drain to the Upper Ammonoosuc River, which flows north and west to join the Connecticut at Groveton.

=== Adjacent municipalities ===
- Stark (north)
- Milan (northeast)
- Berlin (east)
- Randolph (southeast)
- Jefferson (south)
- Lancaster (west)

=== Climate ===
Climate data for York Pond, New Hampshire, western part of Berlin close to Kilkenny Township (1991–2020 normals; extremes April 1989-present)
Month	Jan	Feb	Mar	Apr	May	Jun	Jul	Aug	Sep	Oct	Nov	Dec	Year
Record high °F (°C)	63 (17)	68 (20)	79 (26)	86 (30)	97 (36)	93 (34)	95 (35)	94 (34)	91 (33)	82 (28)	72 (22)	65 (18)	97 (36)
Mean maximum °F (°C)	51 (11)	51 (11)	59 (15)	74 (23)	83 (28)	87 (31)	88 (31)	86 (30)	84 (29)	75 (24)	65 (18)	52 (11)	90 (32)
Mean daily maximum °F (°C)	25.8 (−3.4)	28.8 (−1.8)	37.2 (2.9)	50.1 (10.1)	63.6 (17.6)	72.3 (22.4)	77.0 (25.0)	75.6 (24.2)	68.5 (20.3)	54.9 (12.7)	42.0 (5.6)	31.1 (−0.5)	51.8 (11.0)
Daily mean °F (°C)	14.6 (−9.7)	16.9 (−8.4)	25.6 (−3.6)	38.7 (3.7)	51.3 (10.7)	60.3 (15.7)	65.0 (18.3)	63.5 (17.5)	56.0 (13.3)	43.9 (6.6)	32.7 (0.4)	21.1 (−6.1)	40.3 (4.6)
Mean daily minimum °F (°C)	3.5 (−15.8)	5.1 (−14.9)	14.3 (−9.8)	27.3 (−2.6)	39.1 (3.9)	48.3 (9.1)	53.1 (11.7)	51.3 (10.7)	43.4 (6.3)	33.1 (0.6)	23.5 (−4.7)	11.7 (−11.3)	29.0 (−1.7)
Mean minimum °F (°C)	−19 (−28)	−15 (−26)	−9 (−23)	14 (−10)	26 (−3)	35 (2)	42 (6)	39 (4)	29 (−2)	20 (−7)	6 (−14)	−10 (−23)	−22 (−30)
Record low °F (°C)	−31 (−35)	−35 (−37)	−22 (−30)	2 (−17)	22 (−6)	28 (−2)	36 (2)	31 (−1)	21 (−6)	12 (−11)	−10 (−23)	−27 (−33)	−35 (−37)
Average precipitation inches (mm)	3.22 (82)	2.74 (70)	3.23 (82)	3.78 (96)	4.48 (114)	4.63 (118)	4.74 (120)	4.38 (111)	3.62 (92)	5.10 (130)	3.67 (93)	4.15 (105)	46.25 (1,175)
Average snowfall inches (cm)	20.3 (52)	23.2 (59)	15.9 (40)	6.0 (15)	0.4 (1.0)	0.0 (0.0)	0.0 (0.0)	0.0 (0.0)	0.0 (0.0)	1.6 (4.1)	7.5 (19)	19.4 (49)	105.0 (267)
Average extreme snow depth inches (cm)	16 (41)	23 (58)	22 (56)	9 (23)	0 (0)	0 (0)	0 (0)	0 (0)	0 (0)	1 (2.5)	5 (13)	13 (33)	26 (66)
Average precipitation days (≥ 0.01 in)	14	12	12	13	14	14	14	12	12	14	12	16	164
Average snowy days (≥ 0.1 in)	10	10	7	3	0	0.0	0.0	0.0	0.0	1	5	9	52
Source: NOAA

== Demographics ==
Historical population
Census	Pop.	Note	%±
1800	18		—
1810	28		55.6%
1820	24		−14.3%
1830	27		12.5%
1900	47		—
1920	2		—
1960	0		—
1970	0		—
1980	0		—
1990	0		—
2000	0		—
2010	0		—
2020	0		—
U.S. Decennial Census

As of the 2020 census, there were no people living in the township. The township has had no residents for over a century, and there have been early talks in the state government over dissolving it into the nearby city of Berlin.

== See also ==
- List of ghost towns in New Hampshire

== Sources ==
- Town of Jefferson. Jefferson, New Hampshire, Before 1996 (1995). Littleton: Sherwin Dodge. p. 103.
