= New Hampshire Route 115 =

State highway in Coos County, New Hampshire, US

New Hampshire Route 115
- Map of Coos County in northern New Hampshire with NH 115 highlighted in red

Route information
- Maintained by NHDOT
- Length: 9.697 mi (15.606 km)

Major junctions
- South end: US 3 in Carroll
- North end: US 2 in Jefferson

Location
- Country: United States
- State: New Hampshire
- Counties: Coos

Highway system
- New Hampshire Highway System; Interstate; US; State; Turnpikes
← NH 114A	→ NH 115A
← NH 115A	→ NH 116

New Hampshire Route 115 (abbreviated NH 115) is a 9.697-mile-long (15.606 km) north–south state highway in Coos County in northern New Hampshire. The southern terminus of NH 115 is at U.S. Route 3 in Carroll north of Twin Mountain. The northern terminus is at the intersection with U.S. Route 2 in Jefferson. NH 115 is also known as Owl's Head Highway, which is named after an adjacent mountain prominence.

== Route description ==
NH 115 intersects New Hampshire Route 115A (Cherry Mountain Road) and New Hampshire Route 115B (Israel's River Road), where it crosses the Israel River. Several hiking trails can be accessed from NH 115 including the Cohos Trail and two trails up Cherry Mountain, each with designated parking areas. The Agnew State Forest is accessible to the south, via Cherry Mountain Road.

The speed limit varies from 40 miles per hour in Twin Mountain to 55 mph (89 km/h) over the remainder. Much of the road skirts the White Mountain National Forest or other wildlife conservation land.

A spectacular viewpoint is located on NH 115 where it crosses the Jefferson town line, permitting views of distant mountains to the north and west, in Vermont as well as the Pilot Range and Pliny Range in New Hampshire. The Mountain View Grand Hotel is also visible, as is the Mount Washington Regional Airport, both in Whitefield. The airport is accessible via the Airport Road intersection below the viewpoint.

== History ==
Before 1970, the northern terminus of NH 115 was moved from the intersection of Stag Hollow Road and US 2 to its present location at the Hollow Road/US 2 junction a quarter mile to the southeast.

Part of NH 115 once followed what is now NH 115A to NH 115B as well as NH 115B to Stag Hollow Road. In the 1980s, the road was significantly simplified, widened and straightened, resulting in a new alignment to the south of NH 115B. The increased speeds of the improved route may have directly contributed to a significant number of tragic moose-vehicle collisions in recent years along that section.

== Major intersections ==
The entire route is in Coos County.

Location	mi	km	Destinations	Notes
Carroll	0.000	0.000	US 3 – Twin Mountain, Whitefield	
Jefferson	6.573	10.578	NH 115A (Meadows Road) – Jefferson Village, Jefferson Meadows	Southern terminus of NH 115A
Jefferson	9.697	15.606	US 2 (Presidential Highway) – Jefferson, Berlin, Gorham	
1.000 mi = 1.609 km; 1.000 km = 0.621 mi

== Suffixed routes ==
=== New Hampshire Route 115A ===
New Hampshire Route 115A
- Location: Jefferson
- Length: 4.128 mi (6.643 km)

New Hampshire Route 115A (abbreviated NH 115A) is a 4.128-mile-long (6.643 km) north–south state highway in Coos County, New Hampshire. The southern terminus of the road is at New Hampshire Route 115 south of Jefferson at Old Cherry Mountain Road. The northern terminus of NH 115A is at U.S. Route 2 in Jefferson at the Old Corner Store.

=== New Hampshire Route 115B ===
New Hampshire Route 115B
- Location: Jefferson
- Length: 1.5 mi (2.4 km)

New Hampshire Route 115B (abbreviated NH 115B) was the designation for an east–west connector between New Hampshire Route 115 and New Hampshire Route 115A, along the Israel River in Jefferson. Former NH 115B was part of NH 115 prior to the southerly relocation and improvement of that route.

NH 115B, also known as Israel's River Road, was approximately 1.5 miles (2.4 km) long and continues across NH 115 as Valley Road, once the main route from Jefferson to Randolph and beyond. An RV campsite is located along this road.
