= Owl's Head (Carroll, New Hampshire) =

Mountain in the American state of New Hampshire

Coordinates: 44°20′19″N 71°29′33″W

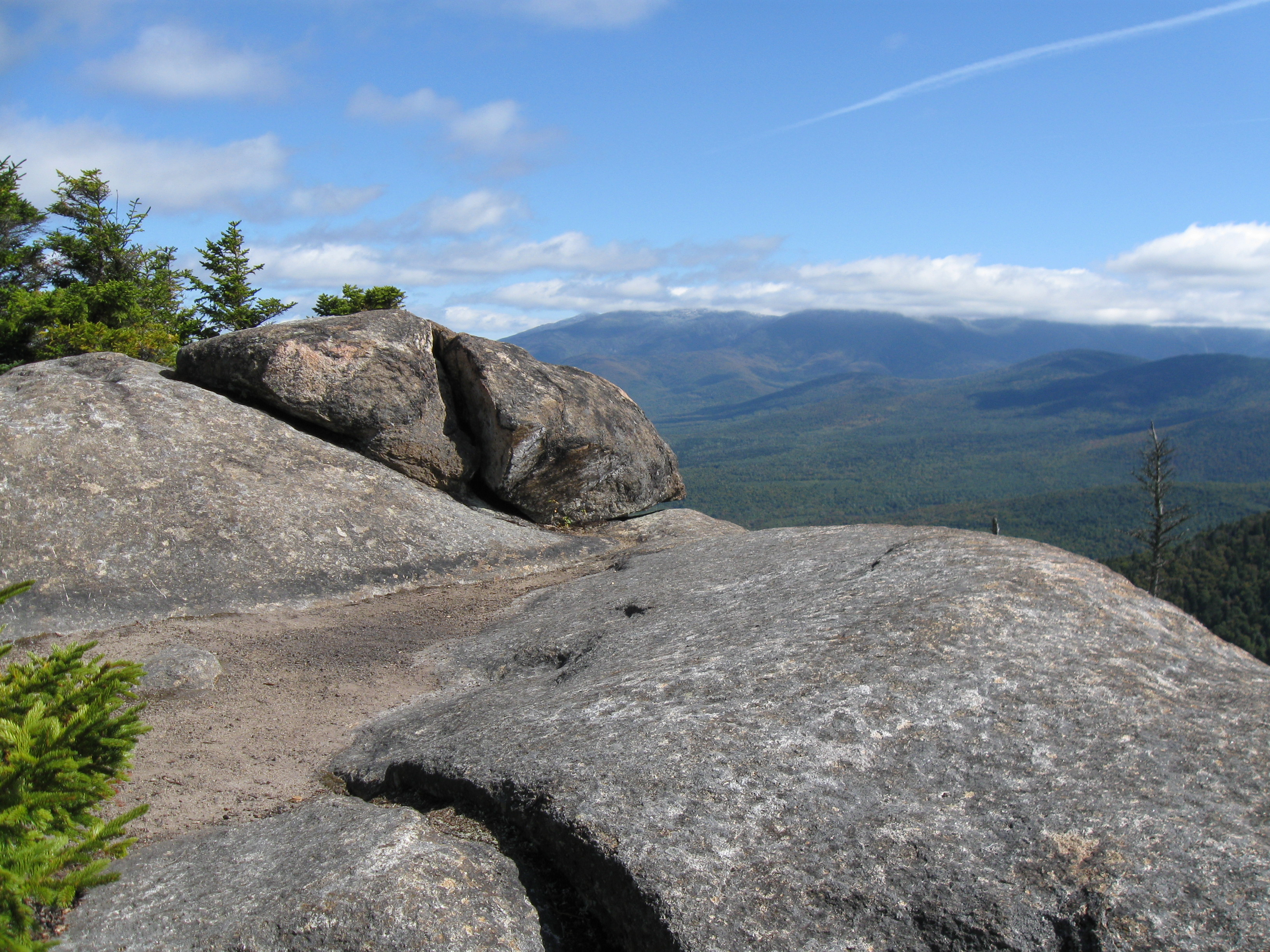
The Presidential Range visible from the summit of Owl's Head

Owl's Head, or Owlshead, is a 3,258-foot (993 m) peak of Cherry Mountain, in Carroll, New Hampshire, United States, and (at least since 2001) the White Mountain National Forest (WMNF). The lower reaches of the mountain also extend northward into the town of Jefferson.

It is known both as the namesake of the nearby Owl's Head Highway, and as a hiking destination on the Owl's Head Trail.

In 2005 the Trust for Public Land (TPL) acquired private land including about three-quarters of the trail, and a road easement that could provide access in place of the part of the trail lying on land that remains private. TPL at that time anticipated transferring its land to the U.S. Forest Service in the following year, for inclusion in the WMNF.

== See also ==
- Owl's Head (Franconia, New Hampshire), on the White Mountains list of 4,000-footers
