= U.S. Route 2 in New Hampshire =

U.S. Highway in New Hampshire, United States

U.S. Route 2
- US 2 highlighted in red

Route information
- Maintained by NHDOT
- Length: 35.437 mi (57.030 km)
- Existed: 1926–present

Major junctions
- West end: US 2 at the Vermont state line in Lancaster
- US 3 in Lancaster; NH 16 in Gorham
- East end: US 2 at the Maine state line in Shelburne

Location
- Country: United States
- State: New Hampshire
- Counties: Coös

Highway system
- United States Numbered Highway System; List; Special; Divided; New Hampshire Highway System; Interstate; US; State; Turnpikes
← NH 1B	→ US 3

U.S. Route 2 (US 2) is a part of the United States Numbered Highway System that is split into two segments, one between Washington and Michigan and the other between New York and Maine. In New Hampshire, US 2 runs 35.437 miles (57.030 km) from the Vermont state line at the Connecticut River in Lancaster east to the Maine state line in Shelburne. US 2 is the main highway through the White Mountains across southern Coös County, where it also passes through Jefferson, Randolph, and Gorham. US 2 is the main connection between the Coös county seat of Lancaster, where the highway intersects US 3, and the county's largest city, Berlin, via its connection with New Hampshire Route 16 (NH 16) in Gorham.

== Route description ==
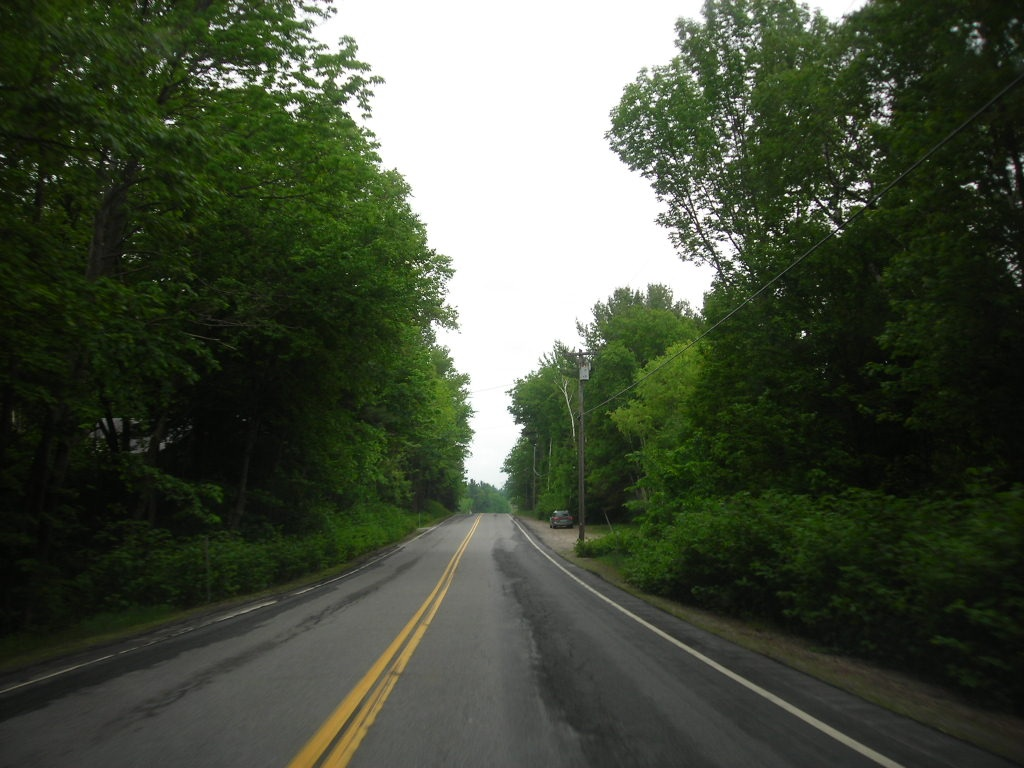
Westbound US 2 in Shelburne

US 2 enters Lancaster by crossing the Connecticut River from the town of Guildhall in Essex County, Vermont. The highway heads east from the bridge into Lancaster along Bridge Street. At the east end of Bridge Street, US 2 meets US 3 (Main Street) at a three-legged roundabout, immediately north of which is the historic Wilder-Holton House. The two U.S. Routes head southeast along Main Street through the Lancaster town center. The routes pass the Coös County Courthouse, the William D. Weeks Memorial Library, and the town's historic post office. At the south end of downtown Lancaster, US 2 and US 3 cross the Israel River and meet the north end of NH 135 (Elm Street). The two U.S. Routes then diverge at an oblique intersection, US 3 on Prospect Street and US 2 on Portland Street.

US 2 heads southeast out of the flat northern Connecticut Valley and into the rolling White Mountain foothills. The highway parallels a state-owned rail line through the valley of the Israel River out of Lancaster and into the village of Riverton in Jefferson, where the highway and rail line cross obliquely at grade and the highway, now named Presidential Highway, crosses the river. US 2 ascends along the south flank of Mount Starr King toward the town center of Jefferson. The route passes Santa's Village and meets the north end of NH 116 (Bailey Road). East of the town center, US 2 meets the north end of NH 115A (Meadows Road) and passes the Waumbek Cottages Historic District. The highway passes through the hamlet of Starr King, crosses Priscilla Brook and Stag Hollow Brook, and meets the east end of NH 115 (Owls Head Highway) at the hamlet of Jefferson Highland.

US 2 continues into the town of Randolph and into the White Mountains proper; the highway runs along the hillside above the Israel River between the Crescent Range to the north and the Presidential Range to the south. The route crosses from the headwaters of the Israel River to the valley of the Moose River at the village of Bowman. US 2 crosses the Moose River several times as it passes through the town center of Randolph. The highway leaves the Moose River and ascends along the southeast flank of Mount Crescent. US 2 then enters the town of Gorham and descends back into the Moose River valley along Lancaster Road. At the bottom of the hill, the route crosses the state-owned Presidential Rail Trail, passes a truck escape ramp, and meets the east end of Jimtown Road, which leads to Moose Brook State Park. The highway follows the low ridge between Moose Brook and the Moose River and intersects the St. Lawrence and Atlantic Railroad at grade before reaching its junction with NH 16 (Main Street).

US 2 and NH 16 follow Main Street through the town center of Gorham, where the two highways crosses the Moose River just west of its confluence with the Androscoggin River. At the east end of town, NH 16 splits south onto Glen Road and US 2 crosses the Peabody River shortly before its oblique at-grade intersection with the railroad. US 2 follows the valley of the Androscoggin River into the town of Shelburne; the valley passes between the Carter-Moriah Range to the south and the Mahoosuc Range to the north. The highway crosses the Rattle River and then Clement Brook in the town center of Shelburne. US 2 parallels the railroad across Connor Brook, just east of which the highway enters the town of Gilead in Oxford County, Maine.

All of US 2 in New Hampshire is part of the National Highway System as a principal arterial.

== History ==
US 2 follows the route of the former Route 15.

== Major intersections ==
The entire route is in Coös County.

Location	mi	km	Destinations	Notes
Lancaster	0.00	0.00	US 2 west – St. Johnsbury	Continuation into Guildhall, Vermont
Lancaster	0.89	1.43	US 3 north (Main Street) – Groveton, Colebrook	Western end of US 3 concurrency
Lancaster	1.70	2.74	NH 135 south (Elm Street) – Dalton, Gilman	Northern terminus of NH 135
Lancaster	1.74	2.80	US 3 south (Prospect Street) – Whitefield	Eastern end of US 3 concurrency
Jefferson	8.12	13.07	NH 116 south (Bailey Road) – Whitefield	Northern terminus of NH 116
Jefferson	8.54	13.74	NH 115A south (Elm Street) – Carroll	Northern terminus of NH 115A
Jefferson	12.43	20.00	NH 115 south (Owls Head Highway) – Carroll	Northern terminus of NH 115
Gorham	24.94	40.14	NH 16 north (Main Street) – Berlin	Western end of NH 16 concurrency
Gorham	26.32	42.36	NH 16 south (Glen Road) – Conway	Eastern end of NH 16 concurrency
Shelburne	35.44	57.04	US 2 east – Bethel	Continuation into Gilead, Maine
1.000 mi = 1.609 km; 1.000 km = 0.621 mi: Concurrency terminus

== See also ==
- List of U.S. Routes in New Hampshire

U.S. Route 2
Previous state: Vermont	New Hampshire	Next state: Maine
