= Mount Waumbek =

Mountain in Coos County, New Hampshire, U.S.

- Location within New Hampshire

Highest point
- Elevation: 4,006 ft (1,221 m)
- Prominence: 1,289 ft (393 m)
- Listing: White Mountain 4000-Footers
- Coordinates: 44°25′58″N 71°25′01″W

Geography
- Location: Coös County, New Hampshire, U.S.
- Parent range: Pliny Range
- Topo map: USGS Pliny Range

Climbing
- Easiest route: Hike

Mount Waumbek is a mountain located in Coos County, New Hampshire. The mountain is part of the Pliny Range of the White Mountains. Waumbek is flanked to the northeast by Mount Weeks, to the west by Mount Starr King, and to the southeast by Pliny Mountain (1099 m). Waumbek is drained by various brooks into the Israel River, and thence into the Connecticut River and Long Island Sound.

Waumbek is one of the Appalachian Mountain Club's "Four-thousand footers" and is located inside the White Mountain National Forest. The summit can be reached from U.S. Route 2 via the Starr King Trail, a segment of the Cohos Trail, from Jefferson village. The Starr King Trail climbs moderately to the summit of Mount Starr King where there used to be a lodge and then across the ridge to the wooded summit of Mount Waumbek. On some older maps it is shown as "Pliny Major" in the uninhabited township of Kilkenny. A colony of gregarious Canada jays lives near the summit of Starr King year-round.

During the early 1960s, the northern flank of Waumbek was under consideration for a ski resort to be named Willard Basin Ski Area, but the project was terminated and the land conveyed to the federal government.

== See also ==
- List of mountains in New Hampshire
- White Mountain National Forest
