= South Branch Israel River =

- Location within New Hampshire Location within the United States

Location
- Country: United States
- State: New Hampshire
- County: Coos
- Townships: Thompson & Meserves Purchase, Low & Burbanks Grant, Jefferson

Physical characteristics
- Source: Mount Jefferson
  - location: Thompson & Meserves Purchase
  - coordinates: 44°18′6″N 71°20′17″W
  - elevation: 3,406 ft (1,038 m)
- Mouth: Israel River
  - location: Jefferson
  - coordinates: 44°21′35″N 71°23′37″W
  - elevation: 1,348 ft (411 m)
- Length: 6.8 mi (10.9 km)

Basin features
- Tributaries
  - right: Little Bear Brook

The South Branch of the Israel River is a 6.8-mile-long (10.9 km) river in the White Mountains of New Hampshire in the United States. It is a tributary of the Israel River and part of the Connecticut River watershed. For most of its length, it is within the White Mountain National Forest.

The South Branch rises on the western slopes of Mount Jefferson in the Presidential Range of the White Mountains. It flows west, between the Ridge of the Caps to the south and Castellated Ridge to the north, then turns northwest when it reaches the Jefferson Notch Road. The river parallels the notch road and enters the town of Jefferson, where it joins the Israel River.

== See also ==
- List of rivers of New Hampshire
