= 115A =

115A may refer to:

- Florida State Road 115A
- New Hampshire Route 115A
