= Draperville, New Hampshire =

Bobbin milling village in Grantham, New Hampshire

Draperville was a small bobbin milling village in the present-day community of Eastman, located in Grantham, New Hampshire, United States. It was owned by the Draper Corporation of Hopedale, Massachusetts. Draperville was located on the south shore of Eastman Pond.

== History ==
After exhausting the resources in nearby North Newport, the Draper Corporation moved its operations to the south shore of Eastman Pond in Grantham in the early 1910s. In 1916, a construction craze formed the bobbin mill village of Draperville. The purpose of the settlement was to chop down timber to create bobbins, which would be used for the company's high-speed textile looms.

When they used up all of the maple and birch timber in North Newport, the Draper Corporation moved to the Eastman community. Grantham's population seemingly doubled overnight as employees and loggers flooded the area to begin logging. Most workers brought their families along with them, further increasing Grantham's population. Draperville supported a boarding house, a water tower, a barn, a machinery shop, and a school.

The village continued to grow and prosper until the wood supply had been completely exhausted less than a decade after the village's formation. Most structures were torn down, and the Draper Corporation eventually went further north to the Beebe River's shores in the White Mountains, where the now-abandoned model utopian logging settlement of Beebe River would stand. In 1972, the Orr Dam was built on Eastman Pond, and the main millpond's dam, which had previously breached, was restored.

== Geography ==
Draperville was located on the southern shore of Eastman Pond, where the present-day Eastman village in Grantham is. Many roads in Eastman, such as Draper Road, Millpond Lane, Bobbin Hill, and Draper Mill Road, are named for the Draperville area.

Hiking via the Eastman Pond Trail may reveal cellar holes and remnants said to be at Draperville. While its exact location is unknown, it looks to have been somewhere near the unnamed millpond at 43.53034° N, 72.13052° W. The Eastman community of Grantham is now where Draperville once stood.
