= Dartmouth Range =

Mountain range in New Hampshire

- The Dartmouth Range as seen looking west from the first cap of Mount Jefferson, Coos County, New Hampshire

Highest point
- Elevation: 1,136 m (3,727 ft)
- Coordinates: 44°18′08″N 71°24′23″W

Geography
- Location: Coos County, New Hampshire, US

The Dartmouth Range is a mountain range in the White Mountains of New Hampshire in the United States. The range lies in the township of Low and Burbank's Grant and the town of Carroll in Coos County.

The Dartmouth Range is a wooded ridge which runs east-west from Jefferson Notch just west of Mount Jefferson in the Presidential Range to Mount Deception in Carroll, overlooking Bretton Woods and the Mount Washington Hotel. No trails currently traverse the range.

The named summits in the range from west to east are Mount Deception at 1,116 meters (3,661 ft), Mount Dartmouth (the highest point in the range at 1,136 m (3,727 ft)), and Millen Hill at 1,028 m (3,373 ft). Mount Mitten, at 932 m (3,058 ft), lies off the main ridge to the north of Mount Dartmouth.

Water flowing north from the crest of the range is within the drainage basin of the Israel River, by way of the South Branch of the Israel River and Mill Brook. To the south of the ridgecrest, water flows via Jefferson Brook and Halfway Brook to the Ammonoosuc River. Water off the west end of the range flows via Deception Brook into the Ammonoosuc. The Ammonoosuc and Israel rivers both flow west to the Connecticut River, which carries their water south to Long Island Sound.
