= Beebe River, New Hampshire =

Former logging bobbin milling village in Campton, New Hampshire

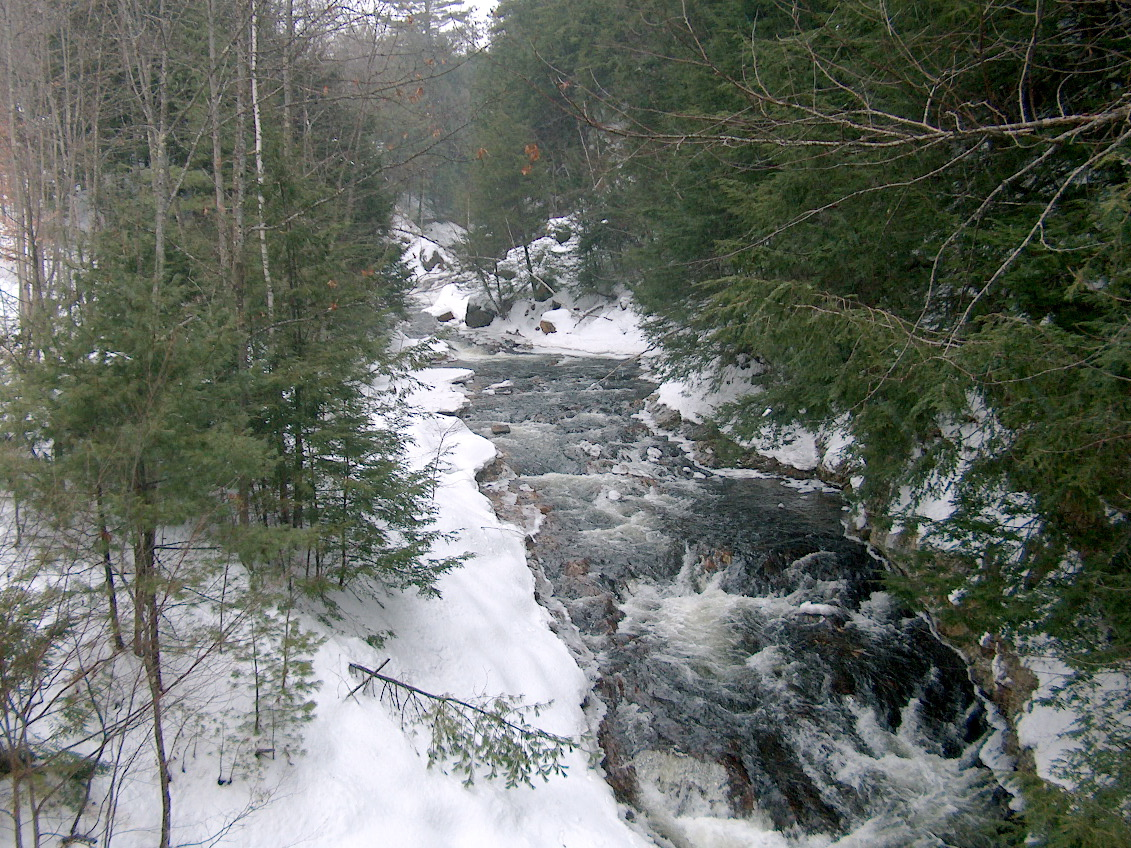
The Beebe River in Campton, New Hampshire, where the Beebe River village was located

Beebe River was a model utopian logging community in Campton, New Hampshire, specifically in Campton Hollow. It was located near the confluence of the Beebe and Pemigewasset rivers. Today, in its place, is the Beebe River neighborhood, a small, redeveloped community.

== History ==
The Parker and Young Company constructed a mill along the Beebe River's tributary, Spencer Brook, in 1917, and the mill quickly kickstarted a modernized village. Eighteen modern homes with indoor bathrooms, running water, and electricity, rare luxuries that would be found in rural areas back then. A 200-person boarding house was in Beebe River, as well as a general store that also served as a dance hall, post-office, movie theater, and town hall. Planning for the village involved a ballfield, school, railroad station, pond, and playground, to further modernize the area.

When the Draper Corporation of Hopedale, Massachusetts(that had recently moved away from Draperville in North Grantham), took over the operations in 1924, and set up bobbin mills, the village became the world's largest bobbin manufacturer, giving success not only to the Beebe River village but also the Draper Corporation.

At Beebe River's peak, the bobbin mills produced 100,000 wooden bobbins a day, employed over 230 workers, and used over 22,000 acres of forest. During Beebe River's successful years, it even operated its own railway line, the Beebe River Railroad. The rail line ran from Campton's Boston & Maine Railroad connection into areas near Mount Whiteface in Waterville Valley. During World War I, the mill's wood went to fighter airplanes. Twelve logging camps from Beebe River's early logging days were along the railway, and, for its time, the industry boasted cutting-edge logging technology.

In the 1920s, after its boom years, the village staryed to deplete its supply of timber and, soon, the demand for bobbins declined, leading to the eventual abandonment of the Beebe River settlement. Today, the village has been redeveloped into a small neighborhood, also called Beebe River. Beebe River Road, off of New Hampshire Route 175 leads to Front Street, Tie Street, and Back Street, the only paths in the area. Not many buildings are located there, however, the railroad bed and some mill ruins from the original village can be found in the Campton Hollow area.

== Geography ==
Beebe River is located east of Interstate 93, near the confluence of the Beebe River and the Pemigewasset River. It is located shortly northwest of Campton Hollow, though the Spencer Brook part of the original settlement can be found a few miles west of Perch Pond, shortly north of Squam Lake and west of Mount Squam. The Crawford Ridgepole Trail passes near Spencer Brook. Mount Weetamoo is also nearby.

== See also ==
- Campton, New Hampshire
- Beebe River
- Pemigewasset River
- List of ghost towns in New Hampshire
