= Eastman, New Hampshire =

Planned community in Grantham, New Hampshire

- Planned community
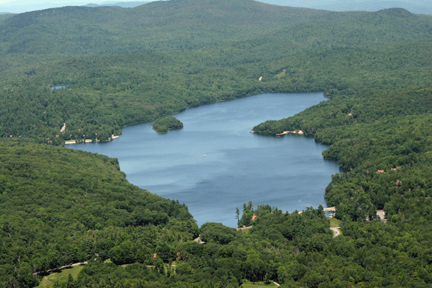
- Interactive map of Eastman, New Hampshire
- Country: United States
- State: New Hampshire
- County: Sullivan
- Town: Grantham
- Hamlets: Draperville
- Elevation: 1,122 ft (342 m)
- Time zone: UTC-5 (Eastern (EST))
  - Summer (DST): UTC-4 (EDT)
- ZIP Code: 03753
- Area code: 603
- GNIS feature ID: 1890365

Eastman is an unincorporated community in the town of Grantham, New Hampshire, United States. It surrounds Eastman Pond and contains the abandoned village of Draperville.

== Geography ==
Eastman is located in the northeast part of the town of Grantham and surrounds Eastman Pond. The community extends northeast into the town of Enfield and east into Springfield. Its main road is Road 'Round The Lake, and it contains the Snow Hill Connector Trail, and the Eastman Pond Trail. It has the Eastman Golf Links, and many winding roads. The community is a planned community, which was redeveloped when Draperville was abandoned, so the aforementioned ghost town's ruins may be difficult, if not impossible to locate.

== Recreation ==
The Eastman planned community is mainly a summer recreational area, although it is open four seasons. It is located along 3,700 acres of protected forest, with condominiums, an 18-hole championship golf course, tennis and pickleball courses, 6 beaches, 2 miles of lake, an indoor pool, a fitness center, and 36 miles of snowshoe, ski, and hiking trails. A millpond at Eastman is where the historic Draperville hamlet once stood, and the Eastman Pond Trail passes right beside it.

== See also ==
- Draperville, New Hampshire
- Grantham, New Hampshire
- Eastman Pond
