= New Hampshire Route 115A =

State highway in New Hampshire, US

New Hampshire Route 115A
- Meadows Road
- Map of Coos County in northern New Hampshire with NH 115A highlighted in red

Route information
- Maintained by NHDOT
- Length: 4.128 mi (6.643 km)

Major junctions
- South end: NH 115 in Jefferson
- North end: US 2 in Jefferson

Location
- Country: United States
- State: New Hampshire
- Counties: Coos

Highway system
- New Hampshire Highway System; Interstate; US; State; Turnpikes
← NH 115	→ NH 115B

New Hampshire Route 115A (abbreviated NH 115A) is a 4.128-mile-long (6.643 km) north–south state highway in Coos County, New Hampshire. The southern terminus of the road is at New Hampshire Route 115 south of Jefferson at Old Cherry Mountain Road. The northern terminus of NH 115A is at U.S. Route 2 in Jefferson at the Old Corner Store.

== Route description ==
NH 115A intersects Whipple Road and Israel's River Road, designated New Hampshire Route 115B but sparsely signed as such, a continuation of the Turnpike Road, built by Colonel Whipple for access from the village of Riverton (Jefferson Mills) to Portland, Maine in the late 18th century. It also crosses the old railroad grade once used by the Boston and Maine Railroad for access to Gorham and the private siding that once serviced the Waumbek Hotel complex. The Portland-Montreal Pipe Line also crosses NH 115A, just below the old Waumbek site. The pipeline right-of-way also serves as "Corridor 5" of the local snowmobile trail system.

The local name of NH 115A is Meadows Road, as it once served the Jefferson Meadows train station and post office. The road passes the Forest Vale Cemetery, where lies the only victim of the Stanley Slide of 1885, which brought a large part of Cherry Mountain down upon the highway.

== History ==

NH 115A between NH 115 and NH 115B was formerly part of NH 115, including two right-angle turns, at least until the 1980s, when the current, more direct NH 115 was built.

NH 115A crosses the wide Israel River valley and passes through what was once a booming dairy industry, now represented by a single dairy farm.

== Major intersections ==
The entire route is in Jefferson, Coos County.

mi	km	Destinations	Notes
0.000	0.000	NH 115 (Owl's Head Highway)	
1.014	1.632	Israel's River Road to NH 115	
4.128	6.643	US 2 (Presidential Highway) – Lancaster, Gorham	
1.000 mi = 1.609 km; 1.000 km = 0.621 mi

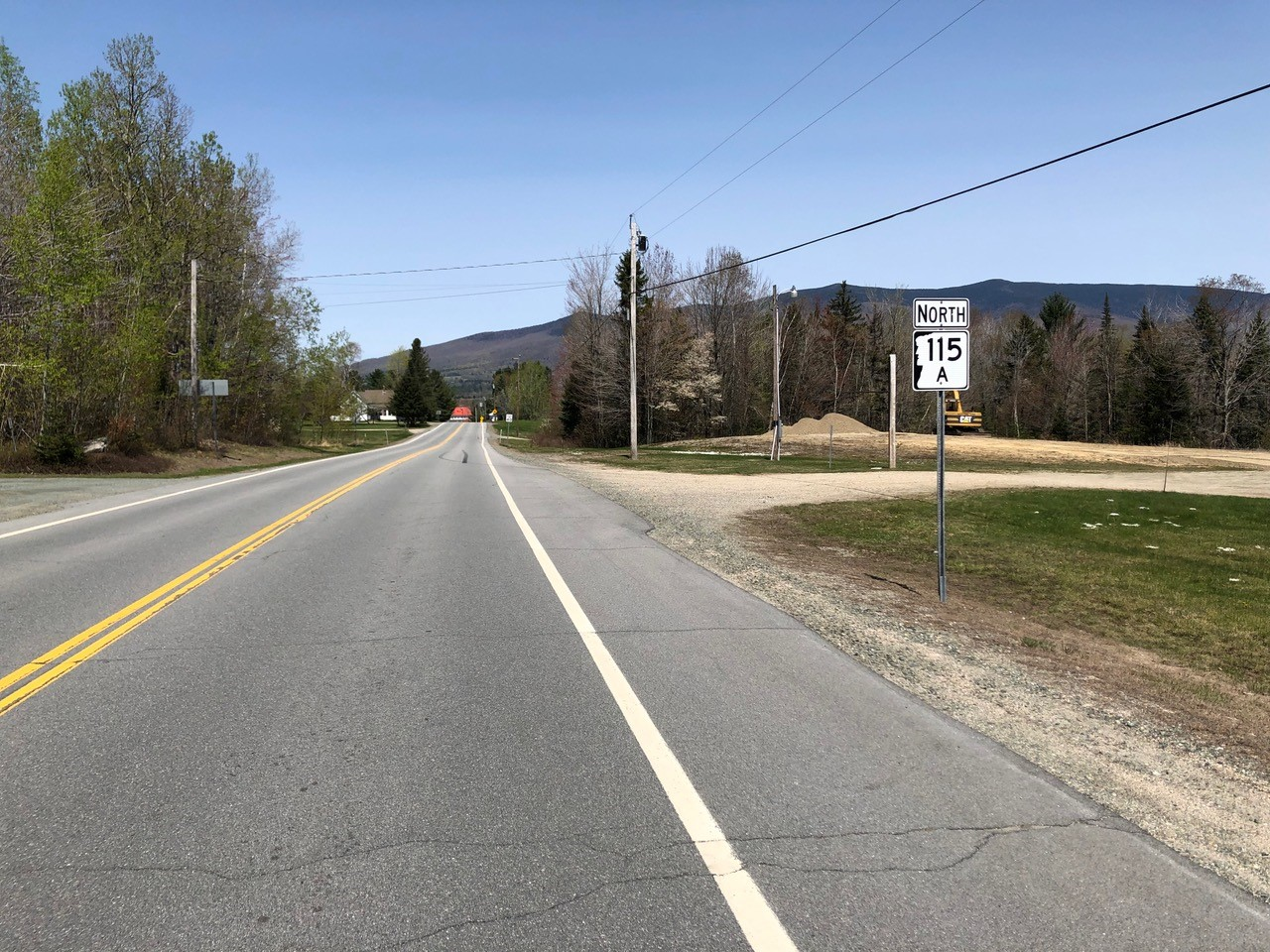
NH 115A leaving its southern terminus at Meadows, NH
