= The Horn (New Hampshire) =

Mountain in New Hampshire, United States

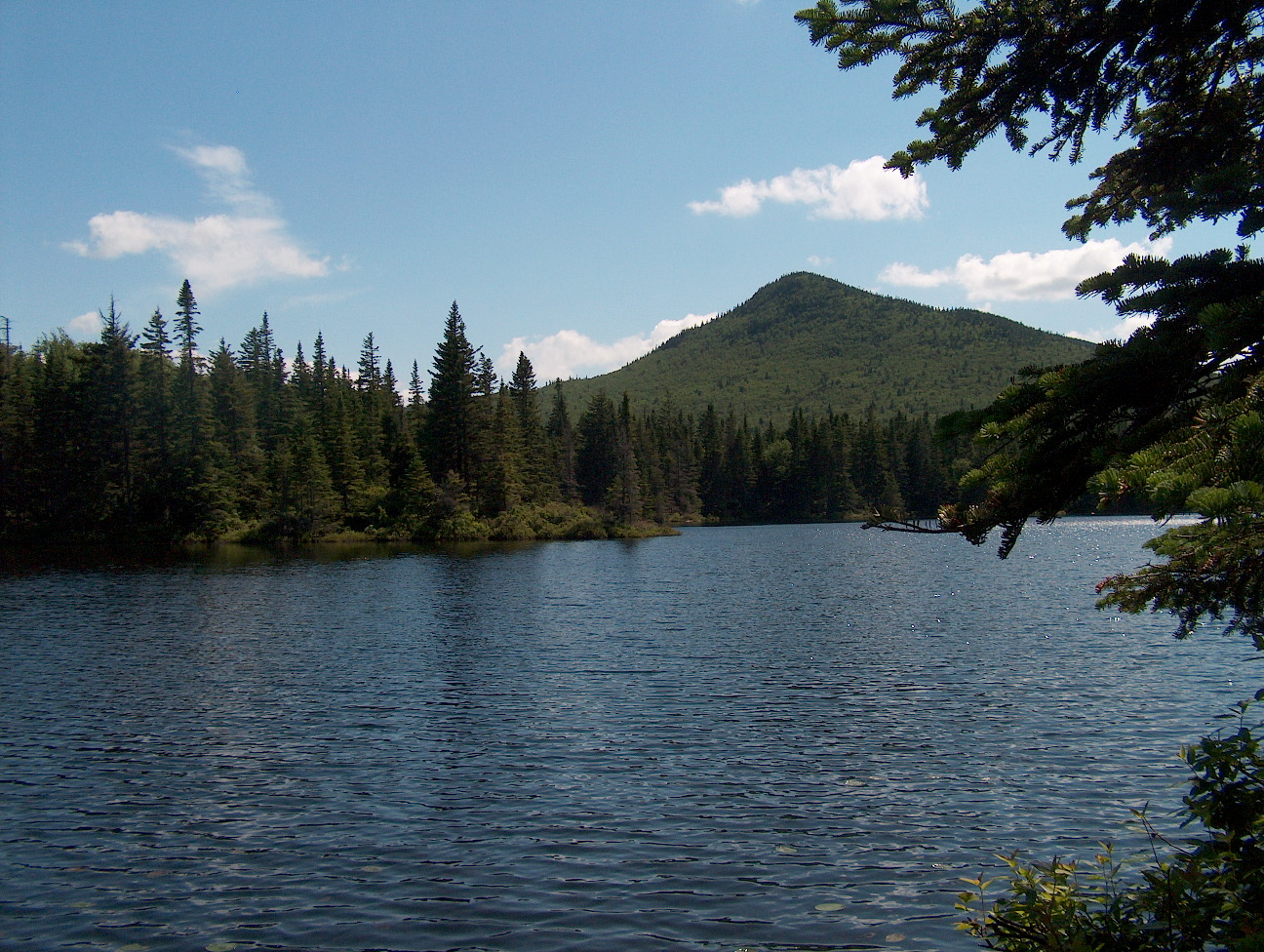
- The Horn rising over Unknown Pond

Highest point
- Elevation: 1,190 m (3,900 ft)
- Prominence: 75 m (246 ft)
- Listing: #75 New England 100 Highest
- Coordinates: 44°31.08′N 71°24.01′W

Geography
- Location: Coos County, New Hampshire
- Parent range: Pilot Range
- Topo map: USGS Stark

The Horn is a mountain located in Coos County, New Hampshire. The mountain is part of the Pilot Range of the White Mountains. The Horn is flanked to the southwest by the Bulge.

The Horn stands within the watershed of the Upper Ammonoosuc River, which drains into the Connecticut River, and thence into Long Island Sound in Connecticut. The south face of the Horn drains into the headwaters of the West Branch of the Upper Ammonoosuc River. The northwest face of the Horn drains north, thence into the West Branch of Mill Brook, and into the Upper Ammonoosuc.

Unknown Pond lies to the northeast of the mountain and provides an excellent view of the peak. The open ledges on the summit face west, however, so it is difficult to see the pond from the top of the mountain. Because of The Horn's location in the northern White Mountains and its distance—5 miles (8.0 km)—from the nearest road, it is much less visited than other comparable summits in the White Mountains.

== See also ==
- List of mountains in New Hampshire
- White Mountain National Forest
- New England Hundred Highest
