= Monson, New Hampshire =

Historic site in New Hampshire, United States

Coordinates: 42°47′10″N 71°37′10″W

- Former town
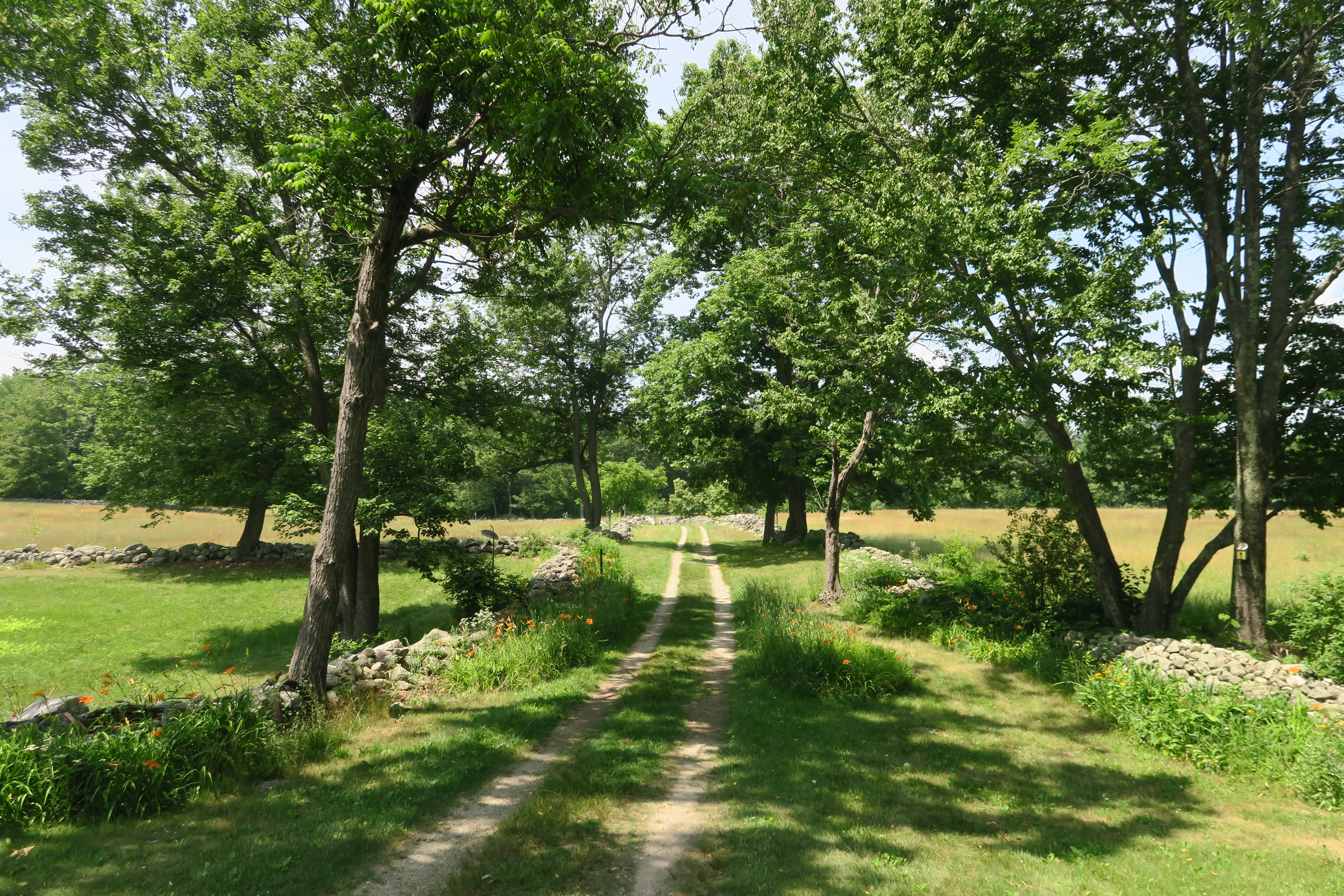
- Adams Road
- Interactive map of Monson, New Hampshire
- Country: United States
- State: New Hampshire
- County: Hillsborough
- Settled: 1737
- Incorporated: April 2, 1746
- Disincorporated: 1770
- Time zone: UTC-5 (Eastern)
  - Summer (DST): Eastern

Monson was a town located in Hillsborough County, New Hampshire, United States. Monson became abandoned in 1770 due to the poor soil on the lands and the limited resources it had at the time. The land that was Monson is now parts of the towns of Hollis, Milford, Amherst, and Brookline.

== See also ==
- List of ghost towns in New Hampshire
