= Mount Mitten =

Mountain in the American state of New Hampshire

Coordinates: 44.316019°N 71.378989°W

Mount Mitten is a 3,058 foot (932 meter) peak in the Dartmouth Range in New Hampshire. It is named for a mitten that Timothy Nash lost when climbing a tree atop the mountain to get his bearings. He saw Crawford Notch.
