= West Branch Upper Ammonoosuc River =

- Location within New Hampshire Location within the United States

Location
- Country: United States
- State: New Hampshire
- County: Coos
- Township and city: Kilkenny, Berlin

Physical characteristics
- Source: Mount Cabot
  - location: Kilkenny
  - coordinates: 44°30′30″N 71°24′19″W
  - elevation: 3,100 ft (940 m)
- Mouth: Upper Ammonoosuc River
  - location: Berlin
  - coordinates: 44°29′51″N 71°18′26″W
  - elevation: 1,289 ft (393 m)
- Length: 6.1 mi (9.8 km)

Basin features
- Tributaries
  - left: No. 9 Brook, Cold Brook
  - right: Spring Brook

The West Branch of the Upper Ammonoosuc River is a 6.1-mile-long (9.8 km) river in northern New Hampshire in the United States. It is a tributary of the Upper Ammonoosuc River and part of the Connecticut River watershed. For most of its length, it is within the White Mountain National Forest.

The West Branch rises in the township of Kilkenny, New Hampshire, in a basin on the east side of Mount Cabot, the highest peak in the Pilot Range. The river flows east into Berlin, passing the Berlin National Fish Hatchery at York Pond before joining the Upper Ammonoosuc River.

== See also ==
- List of New Hampshire rivers
