= Cohos Trail =

Long-distance hiking trail in the United States

Coordinates: 44°37.287′N 71°21.624′W

Southern terminus of the trail, Notchland, New Hampshire

Coos County, New Hampshire

The Cohos Trail is a hiking trail running 162 miles (260 km) through northern New Hampshire in the United States, connecting the northern and southern ends of Coos County. It begins at Notchland, near Crawford Notch State Park, and follows a series of trails to the hamlet of Fabyans, then over Cherry Mountain to the town of Jefferson, over Mount Waumbek, along the Kilkenny Ridge Trail to Stark, through Nash Stream Forest to Dixville Notch, and north to the Connecticut Lakes and finally the Canada–US border at the southern edge of Quebec. There it connects with the Sentier Frontalier's trail to Mount Megantic and Mount Gosford in Canada.

The final section of the trail was completed in 2011, 33 years after it was first proposed by Kim Nilsen, then a newspaper reporter, who became the trail's chief architect.
