= Mount Cabot =

Mountain located in Coos County, New Hampshire

Highest point
- Elevation: 4,160+ ft (1,268+ m)
- Prominence: 2,660 ft (810 m)
- Listing: White Mountain 4000-Footers #14 New England Fifty Finest
- Coordinates: 44°30′22″N 71°24′52″W

Geography
- Location: Coös County, New Hampshire, U.S.
- Parent range: Pilot Range
- Topo map: USGS Stark

Mount Cabot is a mountain located in Coos County, in the U.S. state of New Hampshire. The mountain is the highest peak of the Pilot Range of the White Mountains. Cabot is flanked to the northeast by The Bulge, and to the south of Bunnell Notch by Terrace Mountain. Mount Cabot was named in honor of the Italian explorer Sebastian Cabot.

Cabot is drained by various brooks on the west side into the Israel River and on the east into the West Branch of the Upper Ammonoosuc River, and thence into the Connecticut River and Long Island Sound.

Cabot is one of the Appalachian Mountain Club's "four-thousand footers", the northernmost in New Hampshire. It is also on the New England Fifty Finest list of the most topographically prominent peaks. The valley of the Israel River separates the Pilot Range from the rest of the White Mountains; Mt. Cabot's relative isolation gives it the fifth-highest topographic prominence in New Hampshire, and the fourteenth-highest in New England.

== Climate ==
Climate data for Mount Cabot 44.5064 N, 71.4167 W, Elevation: 3,763 ft (1,147 m) (1991–2020 normals)
Month	Jan	Feb	Mar	Apr	May	Jun	Jul	Aug	Sep	Oct	Nov	Dec	Year
Mean daily maximum °F (°C)	19.6 (−6.9)	22.1 (−5.5)	28.7 (−1.8)	42.5 (5.8)	55.5 (13.1)	63.7 (17.6)	68.0 (20.0)	67.1 (19.5)	60.5 (15.8)	48.0 (8.9)	35.5 (1.9)	25.2 (−3.8)	44.7 (7.1)
Daily mean °F (°C)	11.8 (−11.2)	13.6 (−10.2)	19.9 (−6.7)	33.0 (0.6)	45.7 (7.6)	54.5 (12.5)	59.2 (15.1)	58.3 (14.6)	51.8 (11.0)	40.0 (4.4)	28.8 (−1.8)	18.5 (−7.5)	36.3 (2.4)
Mean daily minimum °F (°C)	4.0 (−15.6)	5.0 (−15.0)	11.2 (−11.6)	23.4 (−4.8)	35.9 (2.2)	45.3 (7.4)	50.4 (10.2)	49.5 (9.7)	43.2 (6.2)	32.1 (0.1)	22.2 (−5.4)	11.9 (−11.2)	27.8 (−2.3)
Average precipitation inches (mm)	5.48 (139)	4.39 (112)	5.59 (142)	5.09 (129)	6.41 (163)	5.99 (152)	7.29 (185)	5.23 (133)	5.49 (139)	7.17 (182)	6.16 (156)	6.28 (160)	70.57 (1,792)
Source: PRISM Climate Group

== See also ==
- List of mountains in New Hampshire
- White Mountain National Forest
