= Alderbrook, New Hampshire =

Abandoned logging community in Bethlehem, New Hampshire

Alderbrook was a small logging hamlet in Bethlehem, New Hampshire. It was located along the Ammonoosuc River, along the present-day Whitefield Road. A major fire burned down the main mill, causing the hamlet to disappear.

== History ==
Henry C. Libbey constructed a sawmill in Bethlehem in 1877, which caused small hamlet to form. The Alderbrook hamlet grew to support a school, a railroad station, a post-office, a boarding house, and a dozen company-owned homes. The mill at Alderbrook employed 40-60 workers and cut and proscessed up to 3-5 million board-feet of shingles, lath, lumber, and clapboards annually.

By the July of 1909, the Alderbrook mill was sold to a Portland company, and was consumed by a fire five months later. The flame is thought to have been sparked by a freight engine. The mill wasn't rebuilt, and the hamlet's industry collapsed, taking the hamlet with it. Today, Alder Brook Road and Douglas Drive mark the Alderbrook hamlet's former location. Whitefield Road, a part of New Hampshire Route 116 leading from Littleton to Whitefield, runs through Alderbrook's site.

== Geography ==
Alderbrook was located on Whitefield Road between Alder Brook Road and Douglas Drive, along the Ammonoosuc River. The hamlet was near the Whitefield, New Hampshire, and Dalton, New Hampshire town lines, and a railroad trail passes through its site along the river.

== See also ==
• New Hampshire Historical Marker No. 198, in Bethlehem, commemorating the hamlet's history
