= Great North Woods =

Forest in New England

The Great North Woods, also known as the Northern Forest, are spread across four northeastern U.S. states: Maine, New Hampshire, Vermont and New York in the New England area. The area spans from the Down East lakes of Maine to the Adirondack Mountains of New York, generally bordering the Canadian province of Quebec. Collectively, the Great North Woods make up a 26 million acre (105,000 km^{2}) forestland.

== States ==
=== New Hampshire ===
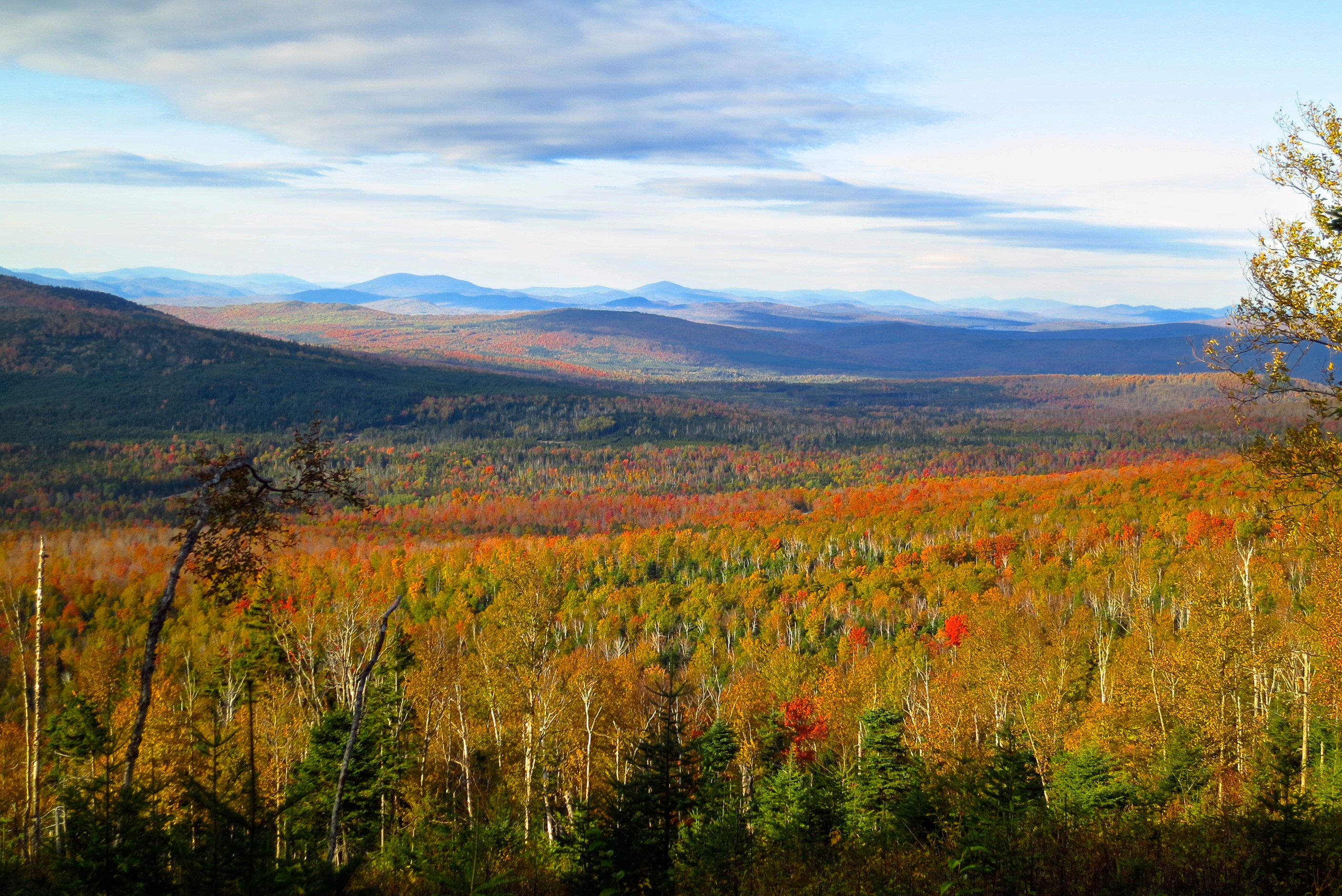
Great North Woods in New Hampshire

In New Hampshire, the Great North Woods Region is an official state tourist region, located in Coös County, the northernmost county in the state. The northern part of the White Mountain National Forest is located in this region. The city of Berlin, formerly known for its large paper mill, is also found in this region.

=== New York ===
Upstate New York's Great North Woods is located in the extreme northern part of the state. Like Maine and Vermont, the Great North Woods region is an unofficial region. In New York, this region mainly consists of the Adirondack Mountains, as defined by the Adirondack Park.

=== Maine ===
Within Maine, the Great North Woods include the Maine North Woods, which are unincorporated townships in Aroostook County. This is an unofficial region of Maine, and no official population figures are published.

=== Vermont ===
Vermont's Great North Woods region is an unofficial region of Vermont, and is located mainly in the Northeast Kingdom, bordering New Hampshire and Québec. The Northeast Kingdom region of Vermont is very remote and rural. The northern part of the Green Mountain National Forest is in this region.

== See also ==
- North Country Trail
- North Woods Law
