= Pilot Range (New Hampshire) =

Mountain range in New Hampshire, United States

Highest point
- Peak: Mount Cabot
- Elevation: 4,160 ft (1,270 m)
- Coordinates: 44°30.22′N 71°24.52′W

Geography
- Country: United States
- State: New Hampshire
- Parent range: White Mountains, Appalachian Mountains

The Pilot Range is located in the White Mountains of New Hampshire in the United States. The Pilot Range extends southeast–northwest about 15 miles (24 km). The highest peak in the range is Mount Cabot, with an elevation of 4,160 feet (1,270 m).

== Summits ==
From northeast to southwest, the range's principal summits include:

- Hutchins Mountain (1,137 m / 3,730 ft)
- Mount Cabot (1,268 m / 4,160 ft) *
- The Bulge (1,201 m / 3,940 ft)
- The Horn (1,190 m / 3,905 ft)
- Terrace Mountain (1,114 m / 3,655 ft)

The summits marked with an asterisk (*) are included on the Appalachian Mountain Club's peak-bagging list of "Four-thousand footers" in New Hampshire.

== Climate ==
York Pond (New Hampshire) is a lake at the bottom of Unknown Pond Peak in the Pilot Range.

Climate data for York Pond, New Hampshire, 1991–2020 normals, 1989-2020 extremes: 1519ft (463m)
Month	Jan	Feb	Mar	Apr	May	Jun	Jul	Aug	Sep	Oct	Nov	Dec	Year
Record high °F (°C)	63 (17)	68 (20)	79 (26)	86 (30)	97 (36)	93 (34)	95 (35)	94 (34)	91 (33)	82 (28)	72 (22)	65 (18)	97 (36)
Mean maximum °F (°C)	51 (11)	51 (11)	59 (15)	74 (23)	83 (28)	87 (31)	88 (31)	86 (30)	84 (29)	75 (24)	65 (18)	52 (11)	90 (32)
Mean daily maximum °F (°C)	25.1 (−3.8)	27.9 (−2.3)	36.4 (2.4)	49.3 (9.6)	62.9 (17.2)	71.5 (21.9)	76.2 (24.6)	74.7 (23.7)	67.7 (19.8)	54.1 (12.3)	41.2 (5.1)	30.1 (−1.1)	51.4 (10.8)
Daily mean °F (°C)	14.3 (−9.8)	16.5 (−8.6)	25.4 (−3.7)	38.3 (3.5)	50.9 (10.5)	59.9 (15.5)	64.6 (18.1)	63.0 (17.2)	55.5 (13.1)	43.6 (6.4)	32.4 (0.2)	20.8 (−6.2)	40.4 (4.7)
Mean daily minimum °F (°C)	3.5 (−15.8)	5.1 (−14.9)	14.5 (−9.7)	27.3 (−2.6)	39.0 (3.9)	48.4 (9.1)	53.0 (11.7)	51.2 (10.7)	43.3 (6.3)	33.0 (0.6)	23.5 (−4.7)	11.5 (−11.4)	29.4 (−1.4)
Mean minimum °F (°C)	−19 (−28)	−15 (−26)	−9 (−23)	14 (−10)	26 (−3)	35 (2)	42 (6)	39 (4)	29 (−2)	21 (−6)	5 (−15)	−10 (−23)	−21 (−29)
Record low °F (°C)	−31 (−35)	−35 (−37)	−22 (−30)	2 (−17)	22 (−6)	28 (−2)	36 (2)	31 (−1)	21 (−6)	12 (−11)	−10 (−23)	−27 (−33)	−35 (−37)
Average precipitation inches (mm)	3.22 (82)	2.86 (73)	3.19 (81)	3.73 (95)	4.39 (112)	4.62 (117)	4.76 (121)	4.42 (112)	3.67 (93)	5.28 (134)	3.90 (99)	4.22 (107)	48.26 (1,226)
Average snowfall inches (cm)	21.40 (54.4)	24.00 (61.0)	16.40 (41.7)	6.10 (15.5)	0.40 (1.0)	0.00 (0.00)	0.00 (0.00)	0.00 (0.00)	0.00 (0.00)	1.70 (4.3)	7.30 (18.5)	18.20 (46.2)	95.5 (242.6)
Source 1: NOAA
Source 2: XMACIS2 (records & monthly max/mins)

== See also ==
- List of mountains in New Hampshire
- White Mountain National Forest
