= Grantham, New Hampshire =

- Town
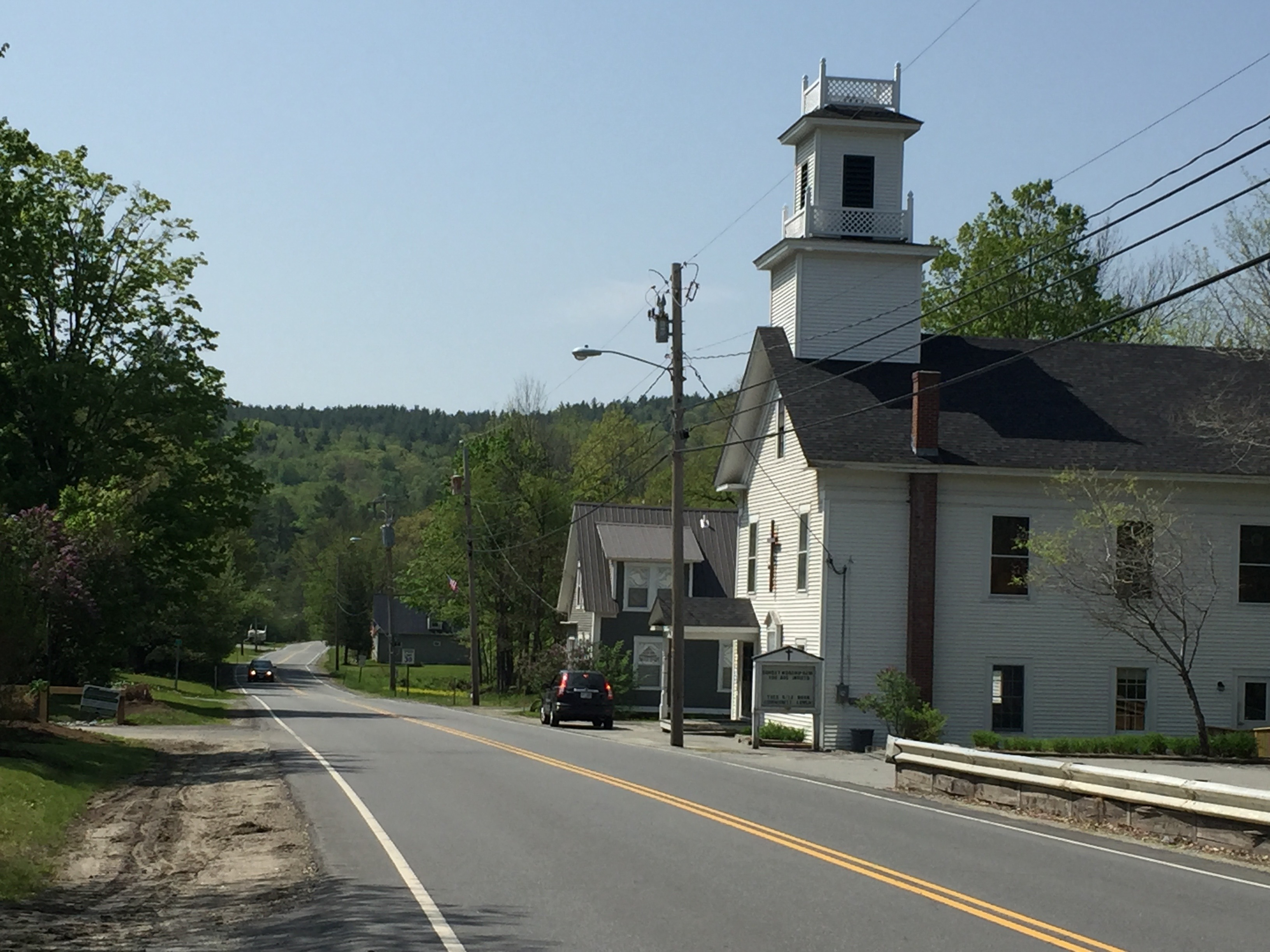
- United Methodist Church in center of Grantham along Route 10, May 2010

- Seal

- Location in Sullivan County and the state of New Hampshire
- Coordinates: 43°31′01″N 72°08′59″W
- Country: United States
- State: New Hampshire
- County: Sullivan
- Incorporated: 1761
- Villages: Grantham; East Grantham; Eastman; North Grantham

Area
  - Total: 28.05 sq mi (72.65 km^{2})
  - Land: 27.22 sq mi (70.49 km^{2})
  - Water: 0.83 sq mi (2.16 km^{2}) 2.97%
- Elevation: 1,408 ft (429 m)

Population (2020)
  - Total: 3,404
  - Density: 152/sq mi (58.6/km^{2})
- Time zone: UTC-5 (Eastern)
  - Summer (DST): UTC-4 (Eastern)
- ZIP code: 03753
- Area code: 603
- FIPS code: 33-31220
- GNIS feature ID: 873610
- Website: granthamnh.gov

Grantham is a town in Sullivan County, New Hampshire, United States. The population was 3,404 at the 2020 census, an increase over the figure of 2,985 tabulated in 2010. The planned community of Eastman is in the eastern part of the town.

== History ==
Incorporated in 1761, Grantham takes its name from Thomas Robinson, 1st Baron Grantham, Secretary of State for the Southern Department from March 1754 to October 1755.Prior to county division in 1827, Grantham was in Cheshire County.

The families of Howe, Dunbar and Leavitt were all early Grantham settlers. All three families secured lands in Grantham as part of the charter granted to Baron Grantham in 1761, and all three families "have Grantham hills named after them," according to Elmer M. Hunt in New Hampshire Town Names And Whence They Came. "The Leavitts are said to have had at one time fifty children in attendance at the town's school, and over the years no fewer than seventeen teachers."

Historical population
Census	Pop.	Note	%±
1790	333		—
1800	713		114.1%
1810	864		21.2%
1820	1,032		19.4%
1830	1,079		4.6%
1840	1,034		−4.2%
1850	784		−24.2%
1860	648		−17.3%
1870	608		−6.2%
1880	540		−11.2%
1890	424		−21.5%
1900	374		−11.8%
1910	286		−23.5%
1920	495		73.1%
1930	302		−39.0%
1940	367		21.5%
1950	359		−2.2%
1960	332		−7.5%
1970	366		10.2%
1980	704		92.3%
1990	1,247		77.1%
2000	2,167		73.8%
2010	2,985		37.7%
2020	3,404		14.0%
U.S. Decennial Census

== Demographics ==
As of the census of 2000, there were 2,167 people, 924 households, and 707 families residing in the town. The population density was 80.9 inhabitants per square mile (31.2/km^{2}). There were 1,513 housing units at an average density of 56.5 per square mile (21.8/km^{2}). The racial makeup of the town was 98.29% White, 0.28% African American, 0.09% Native American, 0.42% Asian, 0.09% from other races, and 0.83% from two or more races. Hispanic or Latino of any race were 0.55% of the population.

There were 924 households, out of which 24.1% had children under the age of 18 living with them, 70.2% were married couples living together, 4.7% had a female householder with no husband present, and 23.4% were non-families. 19.2% of all households were made up of individuals, and 7.1% had someone living alone who was 65 years of age or older. The average household size was 2.35 and the average family size was 2.67.

In the town, the population was spread out, with 19.9% under the age of 18, 2.9% from 18 to 24, 25.7% from 25 to 44, 29.7% from 45 to 64, and 21.7% who were 65 years of age or older. The median age was 46 years. For every 100 females, there were 96.1 males. For every 100 females age 18 and over, there were 95.6 males.

The median income for a household in the town was $63,239, and the median income for a family was $69,271. Males had a median income of $43,250 versus $34,773 for females. The per capita income for the town was $32,174. About 1.4% of families and 2.5% of the population were below the poverty line, including 1.8% of those under age 18 and 3.8% of those age 65 or over.

== Geography ==
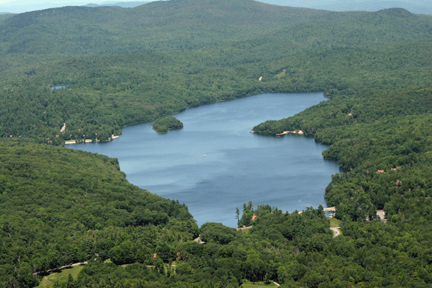
Eastman Pond, August 2006

According to the United States Census Bureau, the town has a total area of 28.0 square miles (72.6 km^{2}), of which 27.2 square miles (70.5 km^{2}) are land and 0.85 square miles (2.2 km^{2}) are water, comprising 2.97% of the town. Grantham is drained by the North Branch Sugar River and its tributaries Sawyer Brook, Stocker Brook, and Eastman Brook. Eastman Pond lies at the head of Eastman Brook and serves as the focal point of the Eastman planned community. Other water bodies in the town include Anderson and Butternut Ponds. Grantham lies fully within the Connecticut River watershed. The highest point in town is Grantham Mountain, 2,660 feet (810 m) above sea level, a peak along the ridge of Croydon Mountain, which follows the western edge of the town.

Interstate 89 crosses the town, leading northwest to Lebanon and southeast to Concord. Access is from Exit 13 (New Hampshire Route 10) near the center of town and from Exit 14 at the northern border of town. Route 10 leads south to Newport, the county seat, and north with I-89 to Lebanon.

The town is home to the Grantham Village School (opened 1981) and Dunbar Free Library (opened 1903).

=== Adjacent municipalities ===
- Enfield (north)
- Springfield (east)
- Croydon (south)
- Plainfield (west)

== See also ==
- List of cities and towns in New Hampshire
