= Eastman Pond =

Lake in New Hampshire, United States

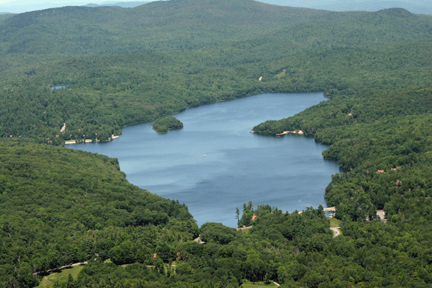
- Aerial view, looking north

- Location within New Hampshire Location within the United States
- Location: Sullivan County and Grafton County, New Hampshire
- Coordinates: 43°31′31″N 72°7′10″W
- Primary inflows: Stony Brook
- Primary outflows: Eastman Brook
- Basin countries: United States
- Max. length: 1.8 mi (2.9 km)
- Max. width: 0.5 mi (0.8 km)
- Surface area: 320 acres (1.3 km^{2})
- Average depth: 10 ft (3.0 m)
- Max. depth: 30 ft (9.1 m)
- Surface elevation: 1,109 ft (338 m)
- Settlements: Grantham; Enfield

Eastman Pond (also known as Eastman Lake) is a 320-acre (1.3 km^{2}) water body located in Sullivan and Grafton counties in western New Hampshire, United States, in the towns of Grantham and Enfield. Water from Eastman Pond flows via Eastman Brook and Stocker Brook to the North Branch of the Sugar River, then the Sugar River, and finally the Connecticut River.

It is the central geographical feature to the Eastman Community, which is a 3,500-acre (14 km^{2}) community consisting of single family homes and condominiums. It serves as a major source of recreational activities for the community and the area at large.

== See also ==
- List of lakes in New Hampshire
