= Low and Burbank's Grant, New Hampshire =

Township in Coos County, New Hampshire, United States

- Township
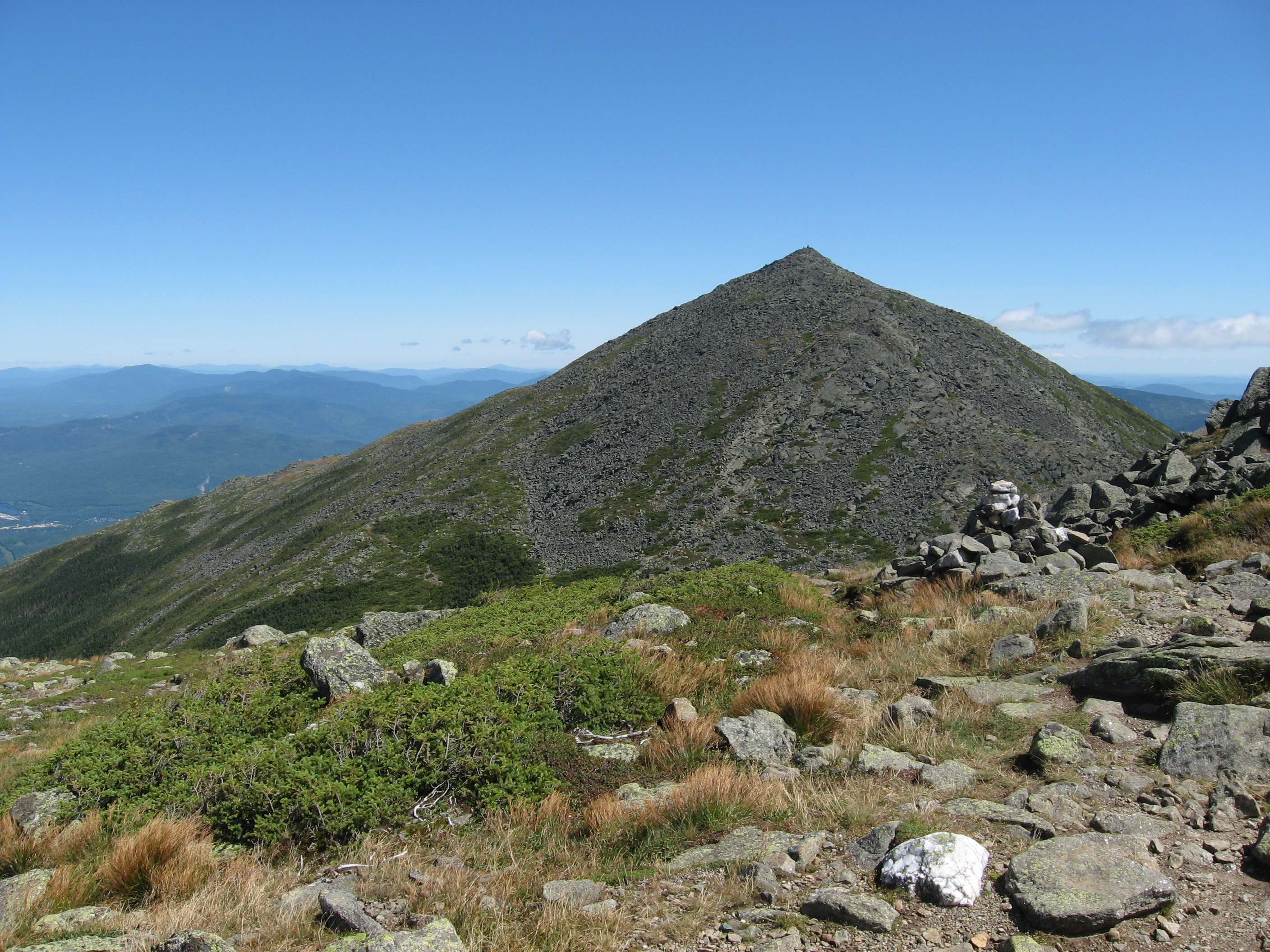
- The northern slope of Mount Madison, as seen from Mount Sam Adams

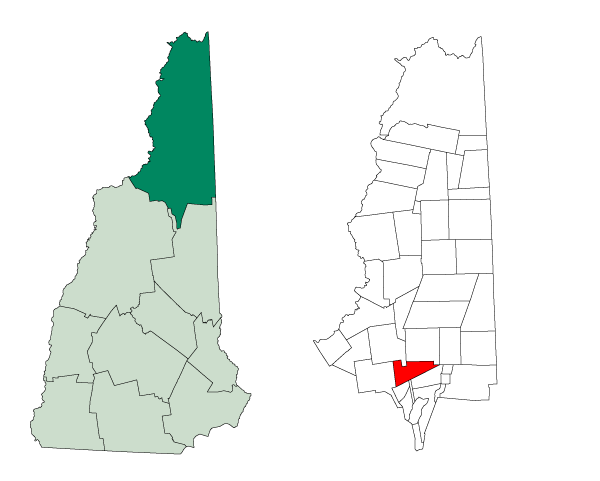
- Location in Coös County, New Hampshire
- Coordinates: 44°19′33″N 71°21′46″W
- Country: United States
- State: New Hampshire
- County: Coös

Area
  - Total: 26.1 sq mi (67.7 km^{2})
  - Land: 26.1 sq mi (67.7 km^{2})
  - Water: 0 sq mi (0 km^{2}) 0%
- Elevation: 2,218 ft (676 m)

Population (2020)
  - Total: 0
- Time zone: UTC-5 (Eastern)
  - Summer (DST): UTC-4 (Eastern)
- Area code: 603
- FIPS code: 33-007-43620
- GNIS feature ID: 872225

Low and Burbank's Grant is a township in Coös County, New Hampshire, United States. The grant lies entirely within the White Mountain National Forest. As of the 2020 census, the grant had a population of zero and was also estimated to be zero in 2025.

In New Hampshire, locations, grants, townships (which are different from towns), and purchases are unincorporated portions of a county which are not part of any town and have limited self-government (if any, as many are uninhabited).

== History ==
The purchase is named for Clovis Lowe of Jefferson and Barker Burbank of Shelburne, who purchased land from the state in 1832.

== Geography ==
According to the United States Census Bureau, the grant has a total area of 26.1 square miles (67.7 km^{2}), of which 0.3 acres (1,335 m^{2}), or 0.002%, are water.

The grant is in the northern White Mountains, on the northern slopes of the Presidential Range and on the Dartmouth Range. Summits in the grant include Mt. Sam Adams—at 5,584 feet (1,702 m) above sea level, the highest point in the grant—and Mt. Madison, elevation 5,367 feet (1,636 m). The northern slopes of the range comprise one of the most densely tracked areas in the White Mountain National Forest. The Randolph Mountain Club and the Appalachian Mountain Club maintain seasonal huts and cabins on the north slopes of these two mountains, at or above 4,000 feet (1,200 m).

=== Adjacent municipalities ===
- Randolph (north)
- Gorham (northeast)
- Thompson and Meserve's Purchase (east)
- Chandler's Purchase (southeast)
- Crawford's Purchase (south)
- Carroll (west)
- Jefferson (northwest)

== Demographics ==
Historical population
Census	Pop.	Note	%±
1960	0		—
1970	0		—
1980	1		—
1990	0		−100.0%
2000	0		—
2010	0		—
2020	0		—
U.S. Decennial Census

As of the 2020 census, there were no people living in the grant.
