= Israel River =

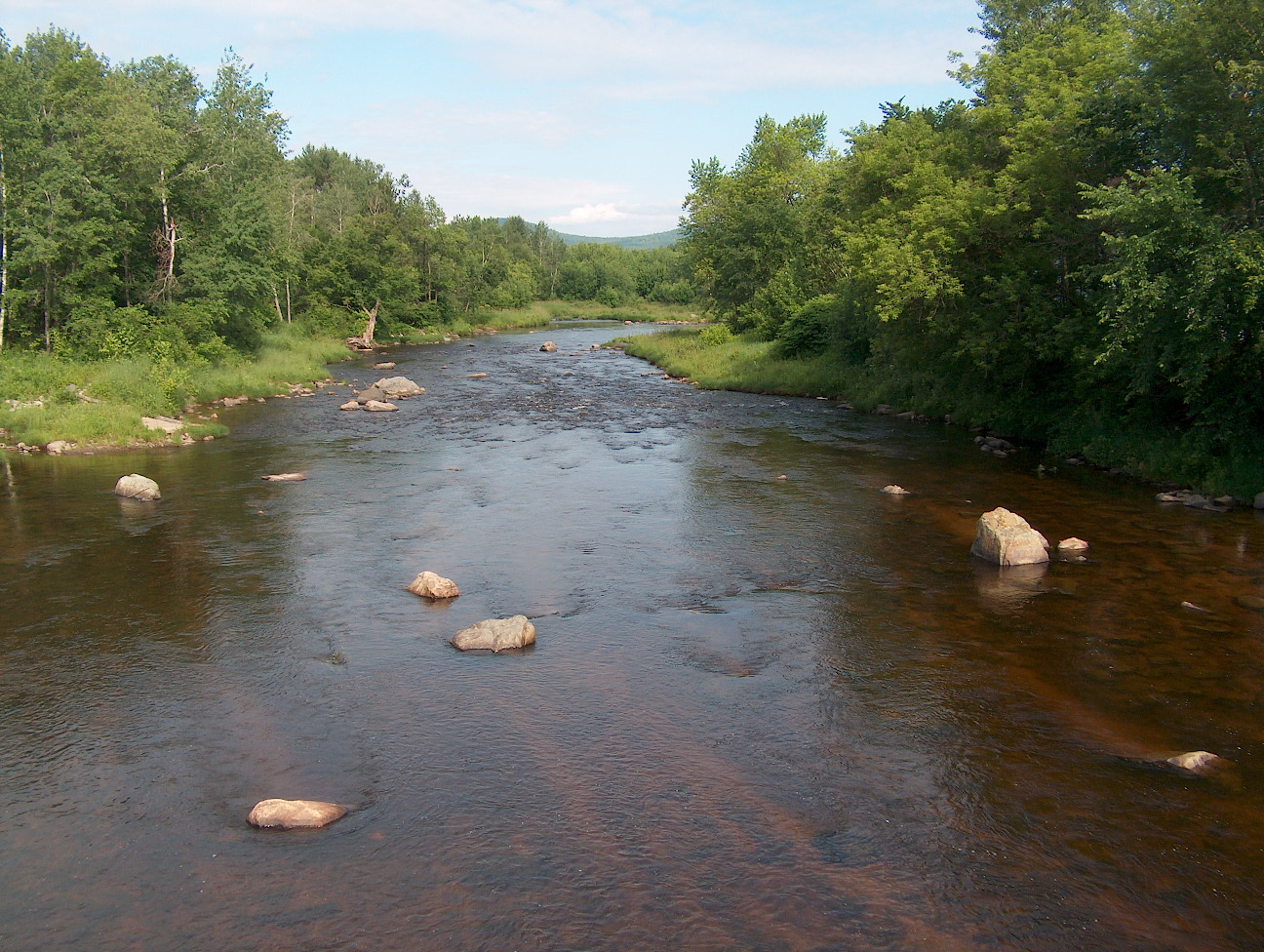
- The Israel River in Lancaster, New Hampshire

- Location within New Hampshire Location within the United States

Location
- Country: United States
- State: New Hampshire
- County: Coos
- Towns: Randolph, Jefferson, Lancaster

Physical characteristics
- Source: Juncture of Cascade and Castle Brooks
  - location: White Mountain National Forest
  - coordinates: 44°20′5″N 71°19′54″W
  - elevation: 2,274 ft (693 m)
- Mouth: Connecticut River
  - location: Lancaster
  - coordinates: 44°29′25″N 71°35′43″W
  - elevation: 837 ft (255 m)
- Length: 23.2 mi (37.3 km)

Basin features
- Tributaries
  - left: South Branch, Red Brook, Mill Brook
  - right: The Mystic, Stag Hollow Brook, Priscilla Brook, Stalbird Brook, Otter Brook

The Israel River, sometimes referred to as Israel's River, is a 23.2-mile-long (37.3 km) river in the White Mountains of New Hampshire, in the United States. It rises in the township of Low and Burbank's Grant and runs generally northwest along U.S. Route 2, traversing the towns of Jefferson and Lancaster, before joining the Connecticut River.

== History ==
The Abenaki people called the river Siwooganock, which means "place of the burnt pine trees". The first name given to the river by English settlers was "Powers River" in honor of Captain Peter Powers (1707-1757), who in 1754 became the first to explore this area. The present name comes from an early hunter and trapper named Israel Glines, whose camp was situated near the outlet of the river. The Johns River, in the nearby town of Whitefield, is named for Israel's brother John.

== Description ==
The Israel River rises near the foot of Mount Adams, at the juncture of Castle Brook and Cascade Brook. With its numerous tributaries, the river drains the northwestern slopes of Mount Adams and Mt. Jefferson in the Presidential Range, the northern slopes of the Dartmouth Range, and the southern slopes of the Pliny Range. The larger tributaries include the South Branch, The Mystic, Castle Brook, Cascade Brook, Stag Hollow Brook, Priscilla Brook (also called Alder Brook), Red Brook, Mill Brook, Garland Brook, and Otter Brook.

Major highway bridges over the river include New Hampshire Route 115, U.S. Route 2 and New Hampshire Route 115A in Jefferson, and U.S. Route 3 on Main Street in Lancaster. A number of smaller bridges are provided for snowmobile trails, and there is an old covered bridge on Mechanic Street in Lancaster (closed in 2004 for major repairs and since reopened).

== See also ==
- List of rivers of New Hampshire

== Notes ==
- Julyan, Robert and Mary (1993). Place Names of the White Mountains (revised ed.). Hanover: University Press of New Hampshire. p. 77. ISBN 0-87451-638-2.
- USDA Forest Service (1993). White Mountain National Forest (Map).
