= Jefferson, New Hampshire =

- Town
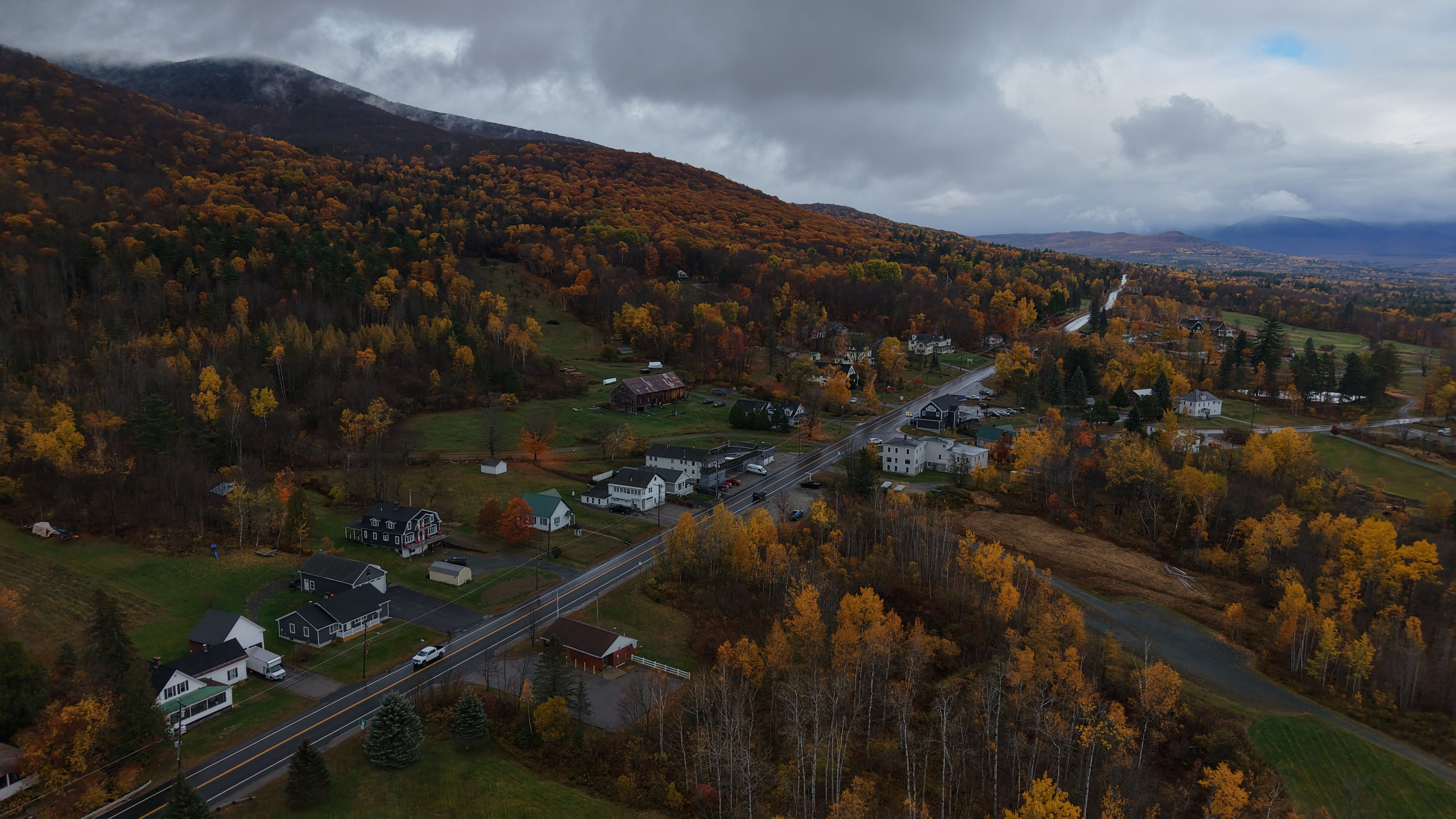
- Jefferson, NH, from the northwest

- Seal

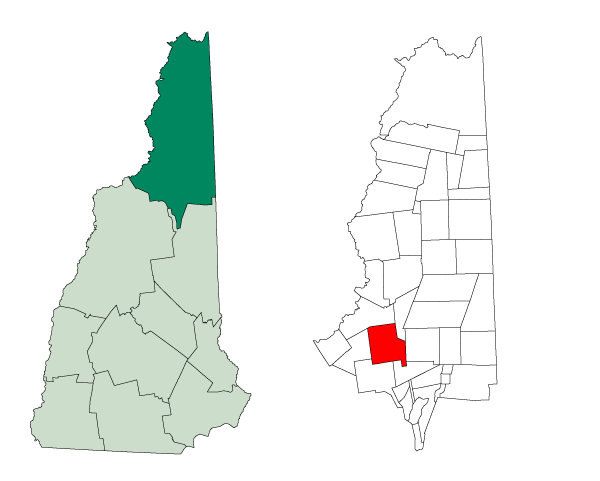
- Location in Coos County, New Hampshire
- Coordinates: 44°23′49″N 71°27′53″W
- Country: United States
- State: New Hampshire
- County: Coos
- Incorporated: 1796
- Villages: Jefferson; Jefferson Highland; Jefferson Station; Baileys; Highlands; Meadows; Riverton; Starr King; Waumbeck Junction

Area
  - Total: 50.32 sq mi (130.34 km^{2})
  - Land: 50.00 sq mi (129.49 km^{2})
  - Water: 0.33 sq mi (0.85 km^{2}) 0.66%
- Elevation: 1,129 ft (344 m)

Population (2020)
  - Total: 1,043
  - Density: 21/sq mi (8.1/km^{2})
- Time zone: UTC-5 (Eastern)
  - Summer (DST): UTC-4 (Eastern)
- ZIP code: 03583
- Area code: 603
- FIPS code: 33-38820
- GNIS feature ID: 873634
- Website: www.jeffersonnh.org

Jefferson is a town in Coos County, New Hampshire, United States. The population was 1,043 at the 2020 census, and an estimated 1,063 in 2025. It is home to parts of the White Mountain National Forest in the south and northeast and to Santa's Village, a Christmas-themed amusement park. There are also several private campgrounds, motels and inns.

Jefferson is part of the Berlin, New Hampshire-Vermont Micropolitan Statistical Area.

== History ==
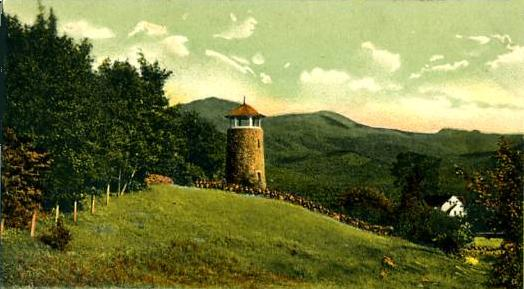
Carter's Tower in 1906

Colonial Governor Benning Wentworth first made land grants in this area in 1765, but the location was so deep in unexplored territory that few settlers took up their claims. So soon after the French and Indian War, in which certain Native American tribes in New England were allied with the French, English colonists did not want to be exposed on the frontier.

Colonel Joseph Whipple (1738–1816) (Note: Colonel Joseph Whipple of Jefferson is a different person than the like-named Colonel Joseph Whipple of Rhode Island, who died in 1746.) took a grant and cut trails through the forests to build a "manor" house. He named the town "Dartmouth" after William Legge, 2nd Earl of Dartmouth, the patron of Dartmouth College. Brother to William Whipple, a signer of the Declaration of Independence, Colonel Whipple renamed the town "Jefferson" four years prior to Thomas Jefferson's election as president. The state legislature granted the town a new charter as "Jefferson" on December 8, 1796.

In the mid-19th century, the boundary with the adjacent township of Kilkenny was moved so as to include that township's few residents in Jefferson.

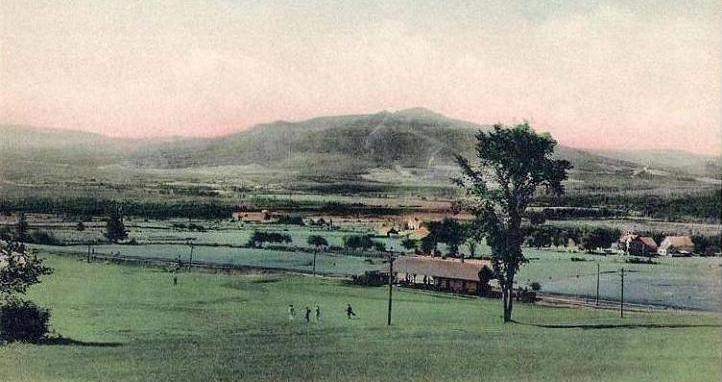
Cherry Mountain from the Waumbek Hotel, c. 1910

Thaddeus S. C. Lowe, a local farm boy born in 1832, became a world-famous inventor of aerostats (dirigibles) and other devices. Consulting President Abraham Lincoln, he organized a balloon corps during the Civil War, and went on to invent the ice-making machine, and later the water-gas process. For years, the latter was used to fuel gas lights in hundreds of cities. His father, Clovis Lowe, had been part owner in 1832 of nearby Low and Burbank's Grant, which contains much of Mount Adams and Mount Madison. Lowe is featured on a New Hampshire historical marker (number 19) in Jefferson.

In 1885, a landslide on the north side of Cherry Mountain demolished the Stanley farm, mortally wounding a worker. Local hotels immediately arranged daily excursions to view the scene, now marked by a New Hampshire historical marker (number 152) titled "Cherry Mountain Slide". Jefferson's third marker (number 229) honors Deborah Vicker, known as "Granny Stalbird", who is said to have brought the first bible to the north country.

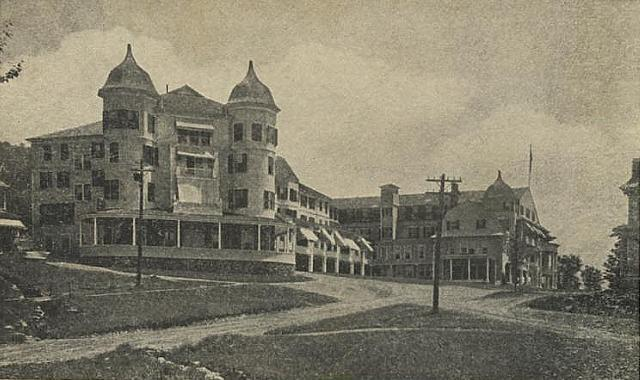
The Waumbek c. 1905

During the early 1900s, Jefferson was a popular summer resort, boasting one of the largest "grand hotels" in the White Mountains—the Waumbek, with accommodations for nearly 300 guests. The hotel had its own rail branch, to deliver guests directly to the hotel from Boston and New York without changing trains. It was destroyed by fire on May 9, 1928.

At tourism's peak, Jefferson had over 30 inns and boarding houses, accessible by several mainline depots, including Riverton, Baileys, Meadows, and Highlands. Some of the original station buildings remain, although most have been moved to nearby locations. The tracks were removed in the 1920s. The wider ownership of automobiles gave people more choices for vacation destinations, and the Great Depression reduced vacations for years. By the end of this period, many people sought other venues than grand hotels.

A number of historic, architecturally interesting structures remain from the resort era. The Waumbek Cottages provided a backdrop for the popular White Mountains Festival of the Arts until 1979. In March 2006, the Waumbek Cottages Historic District was listed in the National Register of Historic Places.

In 1988 and 1989, Jefferson gained national attention when a local volunteer firefighter was charged and tried in connection with dozens of arson fires that had plagued the area. The defendant was acquitted at trial.

== Geography ==
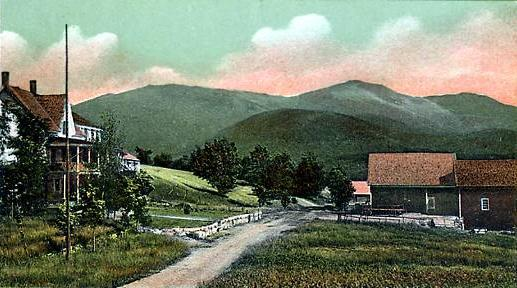
Presidential Range c. 1905

Jefferson is located on U.S. Route 2 between Lancaster and Randolph, west of the midpoint between the Vermont and Maine borders. Set astride the broad Israel River valley, the town commands remarkable views of the Presidential Range and other White Mountain summits. Mount Starr King, with an elevation of 3,907 feet (1,191 m) and named for Thomas Starr King, is the highest point in town, near the town's northern border. It is regularly traversed by hikers scaling nearby 4,006-foot (1,221 m) Mount Waumbek, one of the "four-thousand footers"—the 48 peaks above 4,000 feet (1,200 m) in New Hampshire. Jefferson lies fully within the Connecticut River watershed.

In the past few years, thousands of acres of Jefferson have been sold or donated by private interests to the White Mountain National Forest. These include the Randolph Town Forest, a part of which is within the boundaries of Jefferson, the Silvio O. Conte National Fish and Wildlife Refuge, and Mount Starr King.

According to the United States Census Bureau, the town has a total area of 50.3 square miles (130.3 km^{2}), of which 50.0 square miles (129.5 km^{2}) are land and 0.3 square miles (0.9 km^{2}) are water, comprising 0.66% of the town.

=== Adjacent municipalities ===
- Lancaster (north)
- Kilkenny (northeast)
- Randolph (east)
- Low and Burbank's Grant (southeast)
- Carroll (south)
- Whitefield (west)

=== Climate ===
According to the Köppen Climate Classification system, Jefferson has a warm-summer humid continental climate, abbreviated "Dfb" on climate maps.

Climate data for Jefferson, New Hampshire, 1991–2020 normals, extremes 2000–present
Month	Jan	Feb	Mar	Apr	May	Jun	Jul	Aug	Sep	Oct	Nov	Dec	Year
Record high °F (°C)	62 (17)	65 (18)	78 (26)	86 (30)	93 (34)	94 (34)	94 (34)	92 (33)	92 (33)	80 (27)	71 (22)	62 (17)	94 (34)
Mean maximum °F (°C)	50.5 (10.3)	50.1 (10.1)	58.4 (14.7)	75.3 (24.1)	84.1 (28.9)	87.6 (30.9)	88.8 (31.6)	85.9 (29.9)	84.3 (29.1)	72.4 (22.4)	64.1 (17.8)	51.5 (10.8)	90.6 (32.6)
Mean daily maximum °F (°C)	26.2 (−3.2)	28.8 (−1.8)	37.5 (3.1)	50.9 (10.5)	64.4 (18.0)	72.6 (22.6)	77.6 (25.3)	75.9 (24.4)	67.4 (19.7)	55.3 (12.9)	41.5 (5.3)	30.9 (−0.6)	52.4 (11.4)
Daily mean °F (°C)	16.8 (−8.4)	19.0 (−7.2)	27.6 (−2.4)	40.6 (4.8)	53.1 (11.7)	61.6 (16.4)	66.7 (19.3)	64.8 (18.2)	56.4 (13.6)	46.0 (7.8)	34.0 (1.1)	23.3 (−4.8)	42.5 (5.8)
Mean daily minimum °F (°C)	7.4 (−13.7)	9.1 (−12.7)	17.8 (−7.9)	30.3 (−0.9)	41.7 (5.4)	50.5 (10.3)	55.8 (13.2)	53.6 (12.0)	45.4 (7.4)	36.7 (2.6)	26.5 (−3.1)	15.7 (−9.1)	32.5 (0.3)
Mean minimum °F (°C)	−14.0 (−25.6)	−9.7 (−23.2)	−4.3 (−20.2)	18.8 (−7.3)	30.4 (−0.9)	39.2 (4.0)	45.9 (7.7)	42.7 (5.9)	31.8 (−0.1)	24.9 (−3.9)	10.8 (−11.8)	−4.2 (−20.1)	−16.6 (−27.0)
Record low °F (°C)	−31 (−35)	−22 (−30)	−17 (−27)	8 (−13)	25 (−4)	32 (0)	40 (4)	36 (2)	21 (−6)	16 (−9)	−2 (−19)	−16 (−27)	−31 (−35)
Average precipitation inches (mm)	2.51 (64)	2.28 (58)	2.61 (66)	3.36 (85)	3.80 (97)	4.40 (112)	4.26 (108)	3.98 (101)	3.34 (85)	4.29 (109)	2.95 (75)	3.26 (83)	41.04 (1,043)
Average snowfall inches (cm)	20.1 (51)	19.8 (50)	16.7 (42)	6.5 (17)	0.5 (1.3)	0.0 (0.0)	0.0 (0.0)	0.0 (0.0)	0.0 (0.0)	1.8 (4.6)	7.7 (20)	21.7 (55)	94.8 (240.9)
Average precipitation days (≥ 0.01 in)	16.3	13.5	14.1	13.6	14.5	14.5	12.9	12.2	10.6	14.4	14.5	16.9	168
Average snowy days (≥ 0.1 in)	15.3	13.2	10.5	4.9	0.5	0.0	0.0	0.0	0.0	1.4	7.7	13.7	67.2
Source 1: NOAA
Source 2: National Weather Service (mean maxima and minima 2006–2020)

== Demographics ==
Historical population
Census	Pop.	Note	%±
1800	112		—
1810	197		75.9%
1820	252		27.9%
1830	492		95.2%
1840	575		16.9%
1850	629		9.4%
1860	700		11.3%
1870	826		18.0%
1880	951		15.1%
1890	1,062		11.7%
1900	1,080		1.7%
1910	1,061		−1.8%
1920	960		−9.5%
1930	771		−19.7%
1940	763		−1.0%
1950	728		−4.6%
1960	600		−17.6%
1970	714		19.0%
1980	803		12.5%
1990	965		20.2%
2000	1,006		4.2%
2010	1,107		10.0%
2020	1,043		−5.8%
U.S. Decennial Census

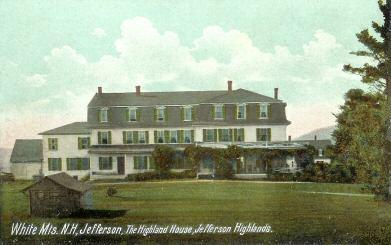
Highland House c. 1910

As of the census of 2000, there were 1,006 people, 407 households, and 295 families residing in the town. The population density was 20.1 inhabitants per square mile (7.8/km^{2}). There were 582 housing units at an average density of 11.6 per square mile (4.5/km^{2}). The racial makeup of the town was 98.31% White, 0.10% Native American, 0.10% Asian, 0.10% Pacific Islander, and 1.39% from two or more races. Hispanic or Latino of any race were 0.10% of the population.

There were 407 households, out of which 28.0% had children under the age of 18 living with them, 62.4% were married couples living together, 5.2% had a female householder with no husband present, and 27.5% were non-families. 20.4% of all households were made up of individuals, and 6.9% had someone living alone who was 65 years of age or older. The average household size was 2.47 and the average family size was 2.84.

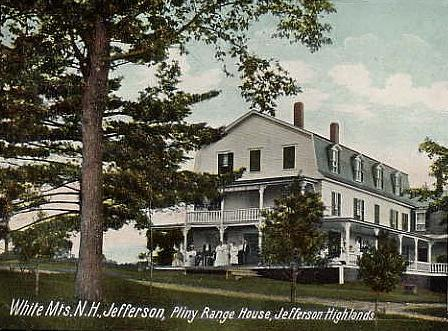
Pliny Range House in 1911

In the town, the population was spread out, with 22.0% under the age of 18, 4.5% from 18 to 24, 27.2% from 25 to 44, 32.4% from 45 to 64, and 13.9% who were 65 years of age or older. The median age was 43 years. For every 100 females, there were 103.6 males. For every 100 females age 18 and over, there were 105.0 males.

The median income for a household in the town was $41,089, and the median income for a family was $42,067. Males had a median income of $27,130 versus $21,382 for females. The per capita income for the town was $19,556. About 4.7% of families and 8.2% of the population were below the poverty line, including 12.0% of those under age 18 and 9.9% of those age 65 or over.

== Sites of interest ==
- Jefferson Historical Museum, located in the former St. John's Methodist church, on US Route 2, east of village center. From June to October it is open free to the public on Thursday and Sunday afternoons.
- Pondicherry Wildlife Refuge

== Notable person ==
- Thaddeus S. C. Lowe (1832–1913), scientist, inventor

== See also ==
- White Mountain art
