= Oliverian Brook =

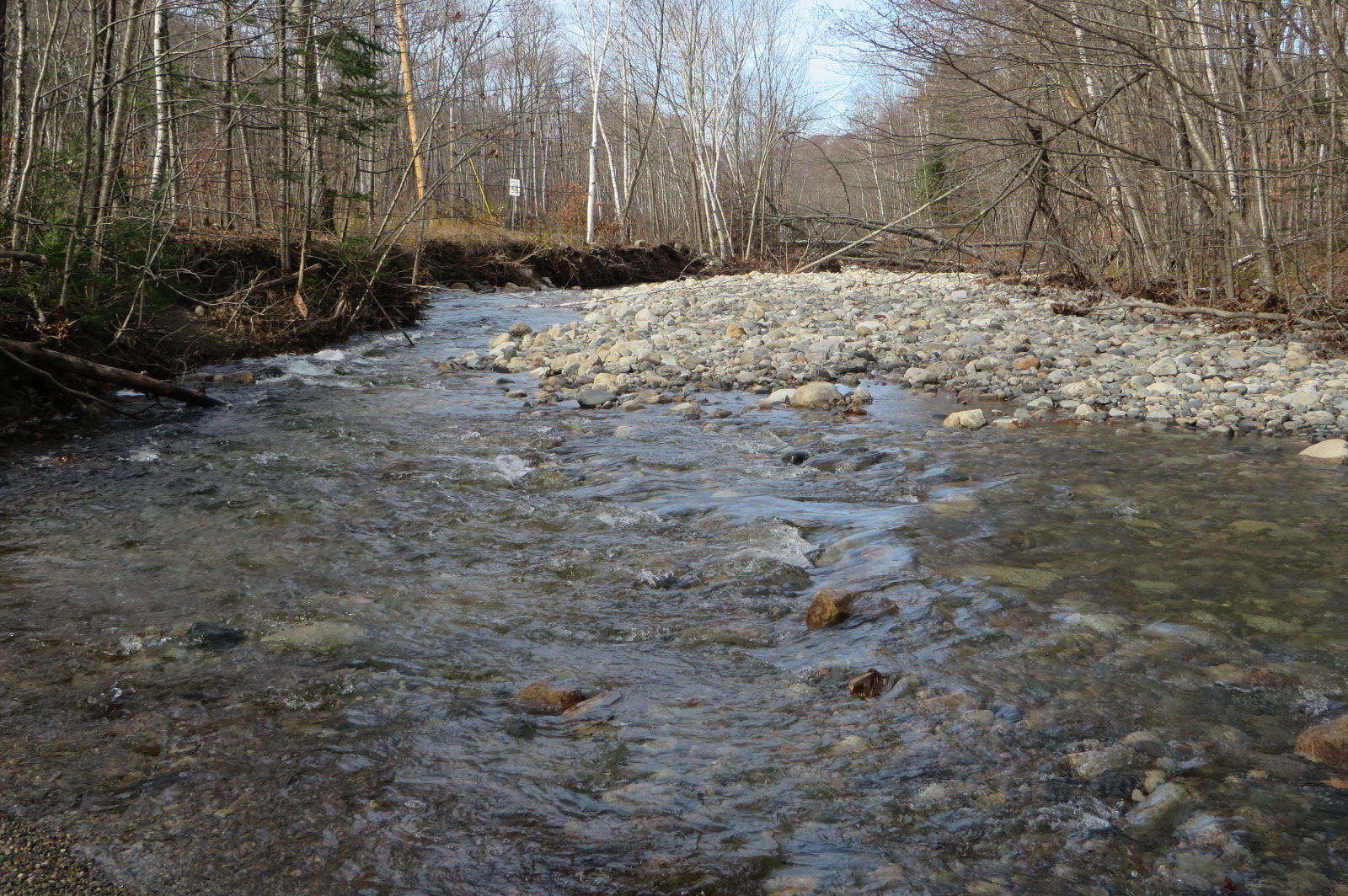
- Oliverian Brook at the Appalachian Trail crossing near Glencliff, New Hampshire

- Location within New Hampshire Location within the United States

Location
- Country: United States
- State: New Hampshire
- County: Grafton
- Towns: Benton, Warren, Haverhill

Physical characteristics
- Source: Confluence of Slide Brook and Still Brook
  - location: Glencliff
  - coordinates: 43°59′46″N 71°53′15″W
  - elevation: 1,290 ft (390 m)
- Mouth: Connecticut River
  - location: Haverhill
  - coordinates: 44°2′50″N 72°3′50″W
  - elevation: 390 ft (120 m)
- Length: 13.1 mi (21.1 km)

Basin features
- Tributaries
  - left: Morris Brook
  - right: Wilmont Brook

Oliverian Brook is a 13.1-mile-long (21.1 km) river in western New Hampshire in the United States. It is a tributary of the Connecticut River, which flows to Long Island Sound.

Oliverian Brook rises in the town of Benton, New Hampshire, on the western slopes of Mount Moosilauke on the northern outskirts of the village of Glencliff, at the juncture of Slide Brook and Still Brook. The brook flows south to near the center of Glencliff in the town of Warren before taking a sharp turn to the northwest and flowing through the center of Oliverian Notch, the westernmost of the major passes through the White Mountains.

The brook passes through a flood control reservoir known as Oliverian Pond before entering the town of Haverhill, where it passes through the villages of East Haverhill and Pike before reaching the Connecticut River near Haverhill village. New Hampshire Route 25 closely follows Oliverian Brook from Glencliff to NH 10 near the Connecticut River.

== See also ==
- List of New Hampshire rivers
