= East Branch Baker River =

- Location within New Hampshire Location within the United States

Location
- Country: United States
- State: New Hampshire
- County: Grafton
- Towns: Woodstock, Warren

Physical characteristics
- Source: Mount Moosilauke (Blue Ridge)
  - location: Woodstock
  - coordinates: 43°59′12″N 71°48′12″W
  - elevation: 2,800 ft (850 m)
- Mouth: Baker River
  - location: Warren
  - coordinates: 43°57′23″N 71°49′59″W
  - elevation: 1,300 ft (400 m)
- Length: 3.1 mi (5.0 km)

Basin features
- Tributaries
  - left: Blodgett Brook

The East Branch of the Baker River is a 3.1-mile-long (5.0 km) river in western New Hampshire in the United States. It is a tributary of the Baker River, part of the Pemigewasset River and Merrimack River watersheds.

The river rises on the southernmost slopes of Mount Moosilauke in the town of Woodstock. Flowing south, it quickly enters the town of Warren and crosses twice under Route 118 before joining the main stem of the Baker.

== See also ==
- List of rivers of New Hampshire
