= Woodland Stewards =

Conservation land trust in the United States

Woodland Stewards logo

Woodland Stewards, Inc. is a conservation land trust in the United States whose mission is to assist landowners with land protection efforts. When landowners in the Coos, Grafton or Carroll counties of New Hampshire wish to protect their land, Woodland Stewards can accept the land or conservation easement donation. These methods guarantee that any protective measures remain in effect forever.

In addition to offering avenues for land protection, Woodland Stewards is an educational resource for local communities. They offer programs designed to demonstrate the natural resource values of open, undeveloped forests, upland and wetlands.

Woodland Stewards is headquartered in Landaff, New Hampshire, and is a non-profit corporation registered with the State of New Hampshire as a Charitable Trust and is a tax-exempt Public Charity under section 501(c)(3) of the Internal Revenue Code.

== Mission statement ==
Woodland Stewards is dedicated to the conservation of open land in the Grafton, Coos and Carroll county areas of New Hampshire. Through the acquisition of land areas and conservation easements, we maintain valuable landscapes for wildlife, hiking, hunting, fishing, skiing, snowshoeing, nature observation and responsible forestry.

There is a profound difference between caring about nature and caring for nature.

== Outreach and education ==
One of the land trust's public education programs is titled "Explore Your Town." It is designed to give people a first-hand appreciation of land protection efforts presented as a series of hikes in various locations under protection by easements, such as the White Mountain National Forest and the Audubon Society of New Hampshire.

During these outings, members of the public are guided through an area, shown items of interest and can ask questions about the history and future of natural resources that receive permanent protection.

== Public service ==
Woodland Stewards has partnered with the U.S. Forest Service to adopt the Tunnel Brook Trail in order to apply land stewardship and management practices in the White Mountains. The trail runs north-south between Mount Moosilauke and Mount Clough in the town of Benton. Service projects along the trail include clearing drainage bars, removing blow-downs, marking the trail with blazes, cutting back brush and low-hanging tree branches and cutting in new sections of trail.

These efforts are performed solely by volunteers who are community members and students from local schools.

== See also ==
- Land Trust Alliance
- Society for the Protection of New Hampshire Forests
- White Mountain National Forest
