= Little River (Atlantic Ocean) =

The Little River (Atlantic Ocean) may refer to a river in the United States:

- Little River (New Hampshire Atlantic coast)
- Little River (Horry County, South Carolina)

== See also ==
- Little River (disambiguation)
