= Baker River (New Hampshire) =

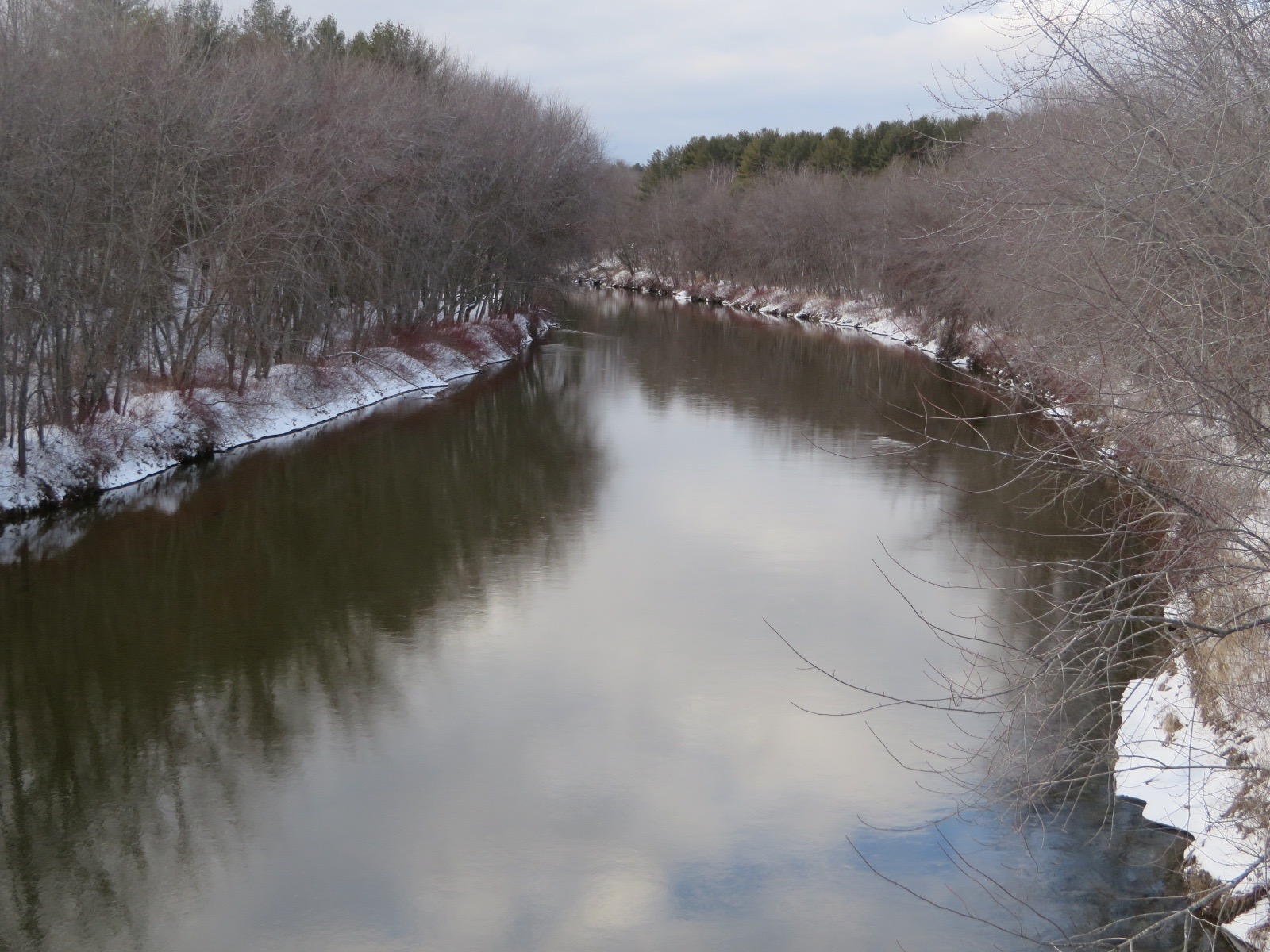
- The Baker River at U.S. Route 3 crossing in Plymouth, New Hampshire

- Location within New Hampshire Location within the United States

Location
- Country: United States
- State: New Hampshire
- County: Grafton

Physical characteristics
- Source: Jobildunc Ravine, Mount Moosilauke
  - location: Benton, New Hampshire
  - coordinates: 44°1′28″N 71°49′0″W
  - elevation: 3,560 ft (1,090 m)
- Mouth: Pemigewasset River
  - location: Plymouth, New Hampshire
  - coordinates: 43°45′49″N 71°41′10″W
  - elevation: 465 ft (142 m)
- Length: 36.4 mi (58.6 km)

Basin features
- Tributaries
  - left: East Branch
  - right: South Branch

The Baker River, or Asquamchumauke (an Abenaki word meaning "salmon spawning place"), is a 36.4-mile-long (58.6 km) river in the White Mountains region of New Hampshire in the United States. It rises on the south side of Mount Moosilauke and runs south and east to empty into the Pemigewasset River in Plymouth. The river traverses the towns of Warren, Wentworth, and Rumney. It is part of the Merrimack River watershed.

The Baker River's name recalls Lt. Thomas Baker (1682–1753), whose company of 34 scouts from Northampton, Massachusetts, passed down the river's valley in 1712 and destroyed a Pemigewasset Indian village. Along this river on April 28, 1752, John Stark and Amos Eastman were captured by Abenaki warriors and taken to Saint-François-du-Lac, Quebec, near Montreal. John Stark's brother William Stark escaped, and David Stinson was killed during the ambush.

On the 1835 Thomas Bradford map of New Hampshire, the river is shown as "Bakers" River, originating on "Mooshillock Mtn."

== Major tributaries ==
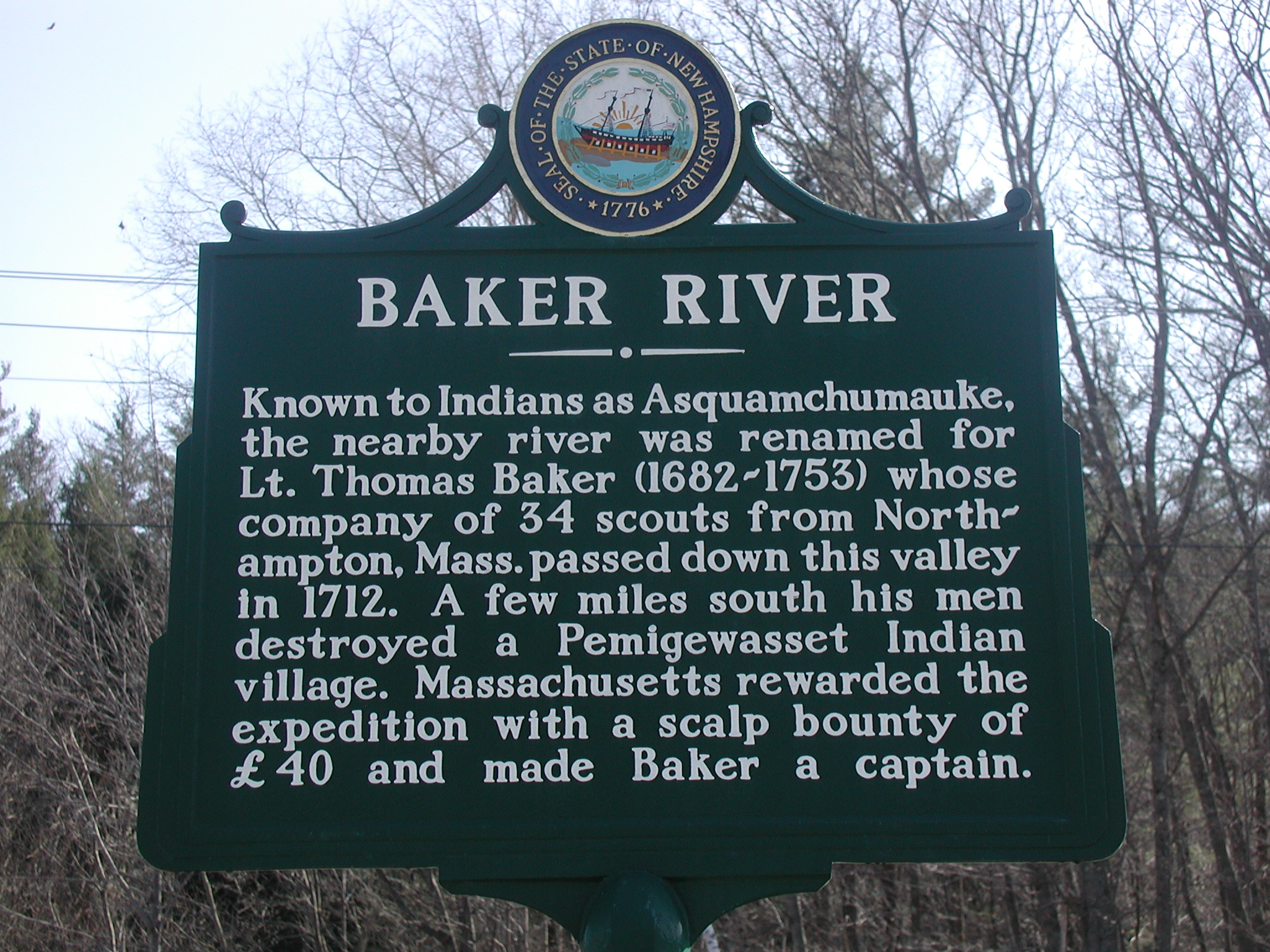
New Hampshire historical marker (number 55) in Rumney

Tributaries greater than 5 miles (8.0 km) long, listed from upstream end to downstream end of Baker River:

- Berry Brook
- Pond Brook
- South Branch Baker River
- Halls Brook
- Stinson Brook

A large fish hatchery is in the Baker River valley in the town of Warren.

== See also ==
- List of New Hampshire rivers
