= Mount Blue (New Hampshire) =

Mountain in New Hampshire, United States

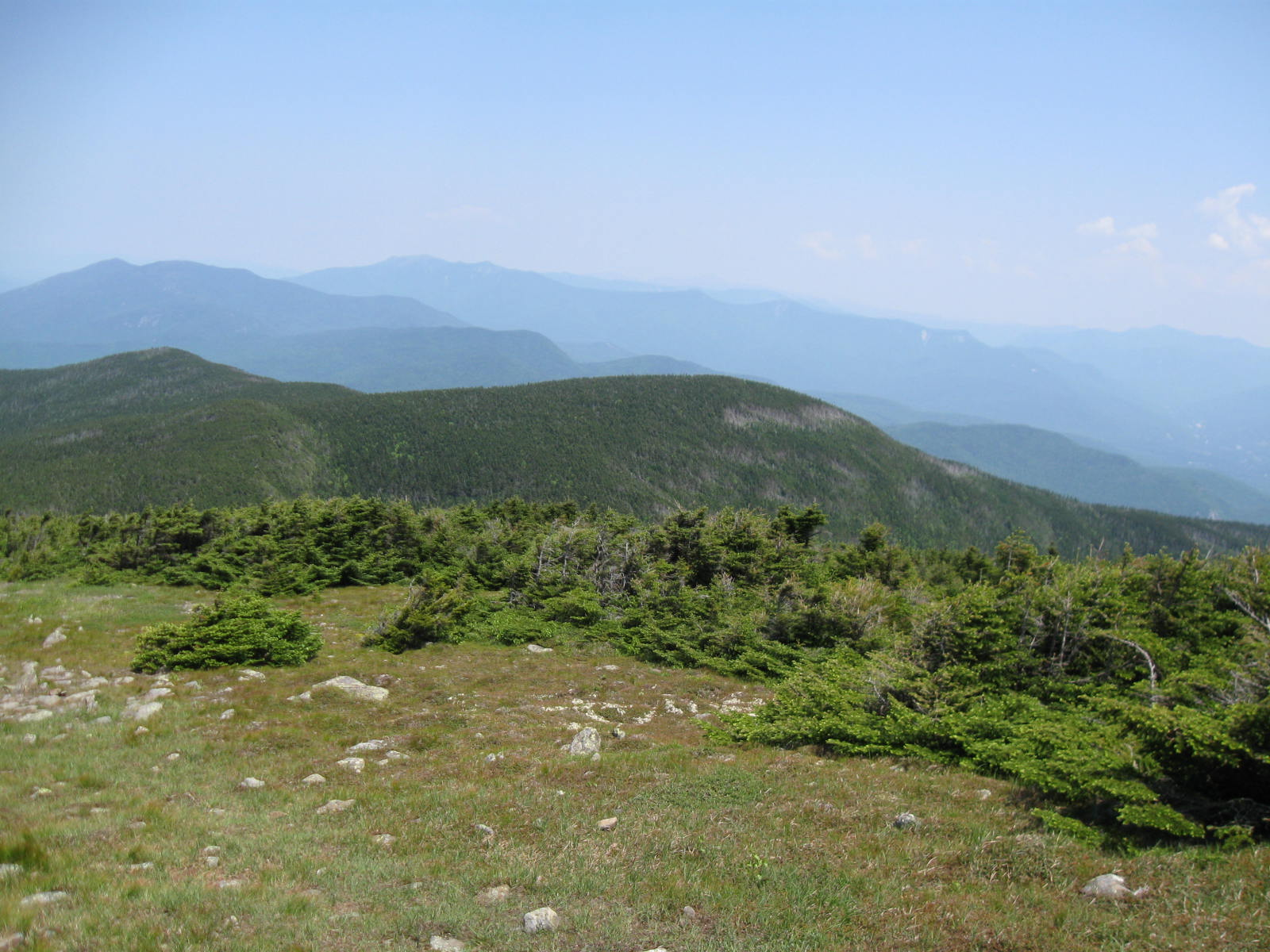
- Mount Blue from near the summit of Mount Moosilauke

Highest point
- Elevation: 4,529 ft (1,380 m)
- Prominence: 129 ft (39 m)
- Coordinates: 44°01′51″N 71°49′13″W

Geography
- Location within New Hampshire
- Location: Grafton County, New Hampshire
- Parent range: White Mountains
- Topo map: USGS Mount Moosilauke

Mount Blue is a mountain in the White Mountains, located in Benton, New Hampshire. In spite of its height over 4,000 feet, it is not usually considered one of the four-thousand footers of New Hampshire, because its prominence is less than 200 feet, making it a sub-peak of Mount Moosilauke.
