= Pike, New Hampshire =

Unincorporated community in New Hampshire, United States

- Unincorporated community
- Location within New Hampshire Location within the United States
- Coordinates: 44°01′51″N 72°00′29″W
- Country: United States
- County: Grafton
- Town: Haverhill
- Elevation: 748 ft (228 m)
- Time zone: UTC-5 (Eastern (EST))
  - Summer (DST): UTC-4 (EDT)
- ZIP code: 03780
- Area code: 603
- GNIS feature ID: 869143

Pike is a small unincorporated community within the town of Haverhill, New Hampshire, United States. It is located in western Grafton County, approximately 3 miles (5 km) east of the village of Haverhill, on Oliverian Brook. The village was named after Alonzo Pike, who produced sharpening stones and tool and cutter grinders from a local deposit of Bethlehem gneiss.

New Hampshire Route 25 runs through the community, heading west to the nearby Connecticut River valley and east through Oliverian Notch to the southern foothills of the White Mountains.

Pike has a separate ZIP code (03780) from the rest of Haverhill. The Pike telephone exchange covers the southern half of the town of Haverhill, including Haverhill village, and extends east to include the village of Glencliff in the town of Warren.
