= South Branch Baker River =

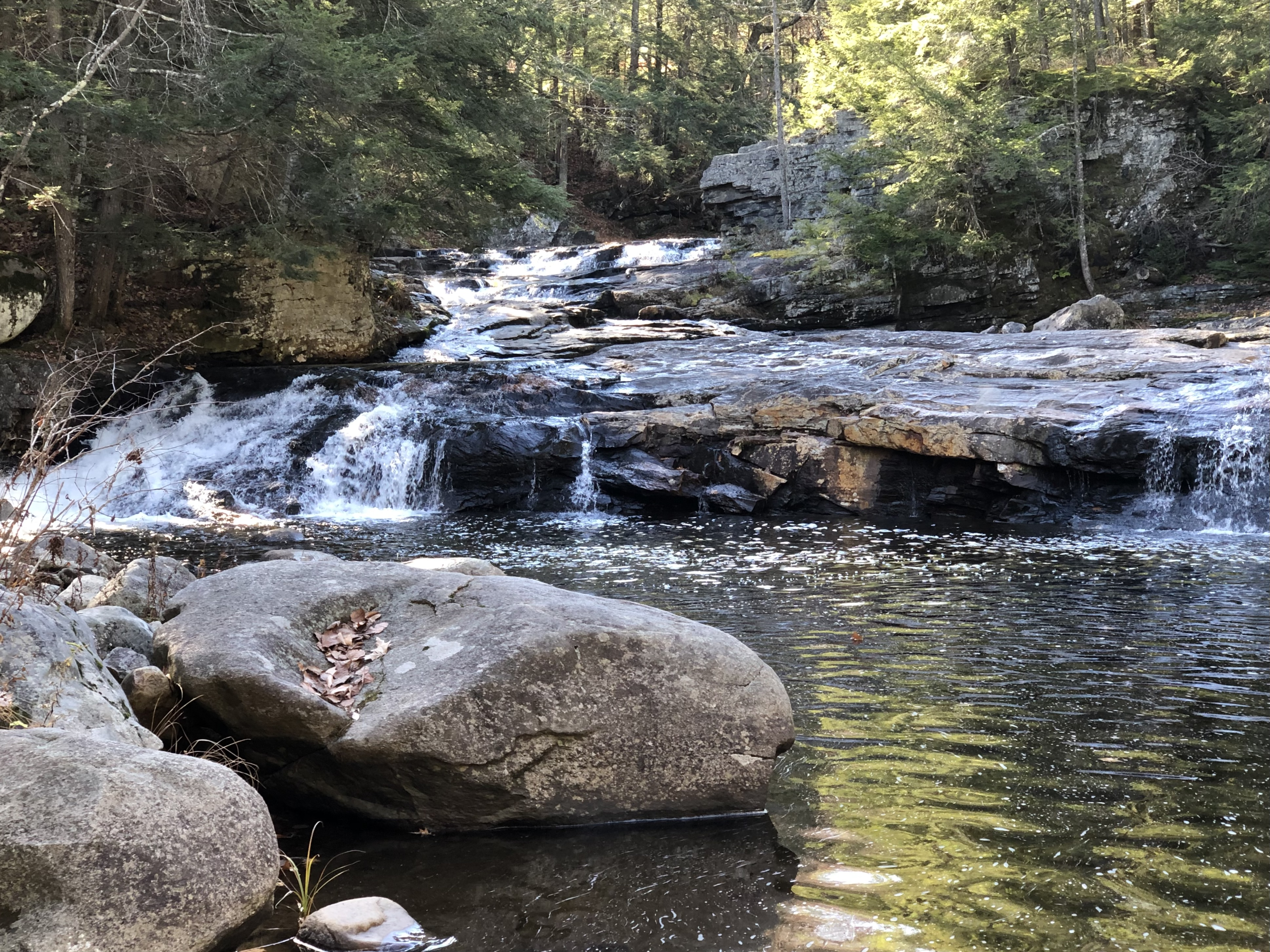
- The South Branch in Wentworth, NH

- Location within New Hampshire Location within the United States

Location
- Country: United States
- State: New Hampshire
- County: Grafton
- Towns: Orange, Groton, Dorchester, Wentworth

Physical characteristics
- Source
  - location: Orange
  - coordinates: 43°40′48″N 71°54′53″W
  - elevation: 2,450 ft (750 m)
- Mouth: Baker River
  - location: Wentworth
  - coordinates: 43°50′2″N 71°53′32″W
  - elevation: 530 ft (160 m)
- Length: 15.6 mi (25.1 km)

Basin features
- Tributaries
  - left: Bucks Brook, Merrill Brook, Rocky Brook

The South Branch of the Baker River is a 15.6-mile-long (25.1 km) river located in western New Hampshire in the United States. It is a tributary of the Baker River, part of the Pemigewasset River and Merrimack River watersheds.

The river rises in the town of Orange, New Hampshire, on high ground north of Mount Cardigan. It flows north through the southwest corner of the town of Groton and the eastern part of Dorchester, enters Wentworth, and drops rapidly to the Baker River.

== See also ==
- List of rivers of New Hampshire
