= Mollidgewock Brook =

- Location within New Hampshire Location within the United States

Location
- Country: United States
- States: Maine, New Hampshire
- Counties: Oxford, ME, Coos, NH
- Towns: Upton, ME, Cambridge, NH, Errol, NH

Physical characteristics
- Source: Mollidgewock Pond
  - location: Upton, ME
  - coordinates: 44°40′21″N 71°1′24″W
  - elevation: 1,667 ft (508 m)
- Mouth: Androscoggin River
  - location: Errol, NH
  - coordinates: 44°44′13″N 71°8′34″W
  - elevation: 1,210 ft (370 m)
- Length: 12.6 mi (20.3 km)

Mollidgewock Brook is a 12.6-mile-long (20.3 km) stream in northern New Hampshire and western Maine in the United States. It is a tributary of the Androscoggin River, which flows south and east into Maine, joining the Kennebec River near the Atlantic Ocean.

Mollidgewock Brook flows out of Mollidgewock Pond in the town of Upton, Maine, and heads west, quickly entering New Hampshire. The brook flows west and north through swampy areas and past low hills in the township of Cambridge before joining the Androscoggin River in the town of Errol.

In 2009, The Trust for Public Land added 3,100 acres (1,300 ha) of the Mollidgewock Brook lands to the Umbagog National Wildlife Refuge. The remaining 1,800 acres (730 ha) were added to 13 Mile Woods, Errol's community forest. Mollidgewock State Park is located along the Androscoggin River opposite the mouth of Mollidgewock Brook.

== See also ==
- List of rivers of New Hampshire
