= Perry Stream =

- Location within New Hampshire Location within the United States

Location
- Country: United States
- State: New Hampshire
- County: Coos
- Town: Pittsburg

Physical characteristics
- Source: Prospect Hill
  - location: Pittsburg
  - coordinates: 45°14′59″N 71°13′26″W
  - elevation: 2,750 ft (840 m)
- Mouth: Connecticut River
  - location: Pittsburg
  - coordinates: 45°4′18″N 71°18′15″W
  - elevation: 1,450 ft (440 m)
- Length: 18.6 mi (29.9 km)

Basin features
- Tributaries
  - left: Perry Brook
  - right: Falkenham Brook, Lamb Valley Brook, Otter Brook, Scott Brook

Perry Stream is an 18.6-mile-long (29.9 km) river in northern New Hampshire in the United States. It is a tributary of the Connecticut River, which flows south to Long Island Sound, an arm of the Atlantic Ocean.

Perry Stream rises in the highlands forming the Canada–United States border, just west of the Connecticut Lakes. The entire length of the stream is within the town of Pittsburg, New Hampshire, the largest town in the state. The stream flows southwest through logging country, reaching the Connecticut River near the site known as Happy Valley.

== See also ==
- List of New Hampshire rivers
