= Little Sugar River (New Hampshire) =

- Location within New Hampshire Location within the United States

Location
- Country: United States
- State: New Hampshire
- County: Sullivan
- Towns: Unity, Charlestown

Physical characteristics
- Source
  - location: Unity
  - coordinates: 43°18′45″N 72°14′15″W
  - elevation: 1,740 ft (530 m)
- Mouth: Connecticut River
  - location: North Charlestown
  - coordinates: 43°18′27″N 72°23′48″W
  - elevation: 285 ft (87 m)
- Length: 13.5 mi (21.7 km)

Basin features
- Tributaries
  - left: Copeland Brook, Pierce Brook, Swett Brook
  - right: Meadow Brook, Chase Brook, Sawyer Brook

The Little Sugar River is a 13.5-mile-long (21.7 km) river in western New Hampshire in the United States. It is a tributary of the Connecticut River, which flows to Long Island Sound. The river flows parallel to and approximately 5 miles (8 km) south of the Sugar River.

The Little Sugar River begins on a tableland in the town of Unity, then drops to the west, cutting a small gorge past the north end of Perry Mountain, and enters the town of Charlestown. The river reaches the Connecticut just west of the village of North Charlestown.

== See also ==
- List of rivers of New Hampshire
