= Oyster River (New Hampshire) =

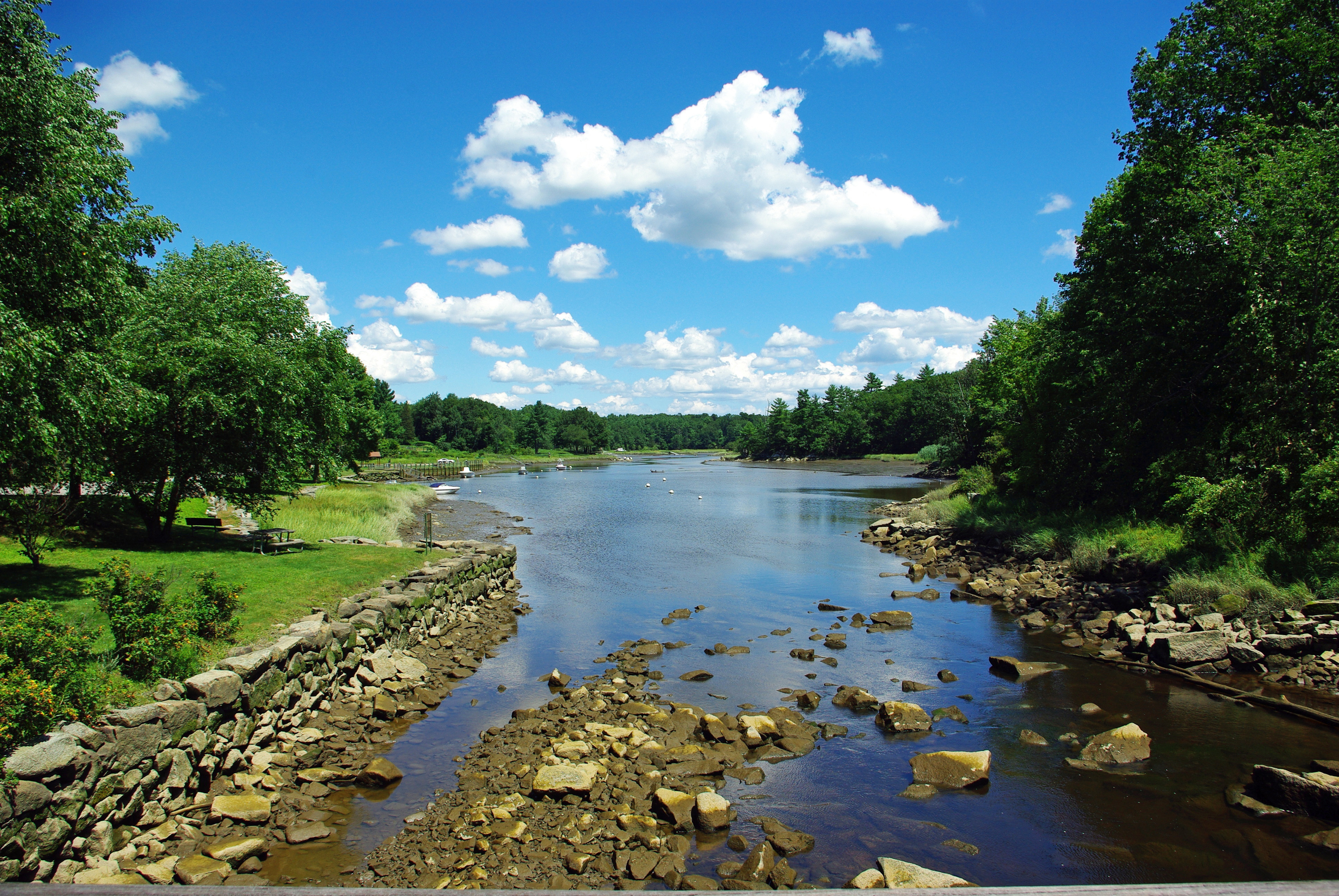
- Oyster River at head of tide in Durham, New Hampshire

- Location within New Hampshire Location within the United States

Location
- Country: United States
- State: New Hampshire
- County: Strafford
- Towns: Barrington, Lee, Madbury, Durham

Physical characteristics
- Source: Creek Pond
  - location: Barrington
  - coordinates: 43°10′3″N 71°1′58″W
  - elevation: 205 ft (62 m)
- Mouth: Little Bay
  - location: Durham
  - coordinates: 43°7′21″N 70°52′4″W
  - elevation: 0 ft (0 m)
- Length: 17.0 mi (27.4 km)

Basin features
- Tributaries
  - left: College Brook, Beards Creek, Johnson Creek, Bunker Creek
  - right: Caldwell Brook, Chelsey Brook, Longmarsh Brook

The Oyster River is a 17-mile-long (27 km) river in Strafford County, southeastern New Hampshire, United States. It rises in Barrington, flows southeast to Lee, then east-southeast in a serpentine course past Durham to meet the entrance of Great Bay into Little Bay. The bays are tidal inlets of the Atlantic Ocean, to which they are connected by a tidal estuary, the Piscataqua River. The freshwater portion of the river is 14.1 miles (22.7 km) long, and the tidal river extends 2.9 miles (4.7 km) from Durham to Great Bay.

The Oyster River reaches tidewater at the base of a dam in the center of Durham, just west of the river's crossing by NH Route 108. Due to siltation, the river is only fully accessible to motorized boats west of the Durham Water Plant for approximately three hours on either side of high tide. Boaters have noticed the increasing effect of siltation on navigation since 1998.

== History ==
The Oyster River valley, like the rest of New England, was entirely covered by ice during the last continental glaciation. Remnants from the Ice Age in the watershed include glacial erratics and kettle holes such as Spruce Hole Bog, 0.5 miles (0.8 km) south of the river in Durham.

Ever since European settlers came to the Oyster River they have altered its flow and taken its resources. In the 1600s, before people had a major effect on the river, Great Bay, into which the Oyster River flows, was a port where sturdy oceangoing ships could anchor at a place called Durham Landing. But as time passed, settlers built dams and cleared the forests for farmland. As forests diminished, soil usually held in place by tree roots started to wash into the river, causing its waters to fill with silt. By the 1800s, oceangoing ships were unable to reach Durham Landing except at extremely high tides.

The Oyster River community was one of the three original Dover settlements, which also included Hilton Point and the current Durham town center. The population of this settlement is said to have peaked at around 300 people in the mid 17th century. However, the population was reduced in 1694 after a Native American raid, commonly known as the Oyster River Massacre or the Raid on Oyster River. In total around 94 inhabitants were either killed or taken hostage by the Native Americans under French command.

=== Mill Pond Dam ===
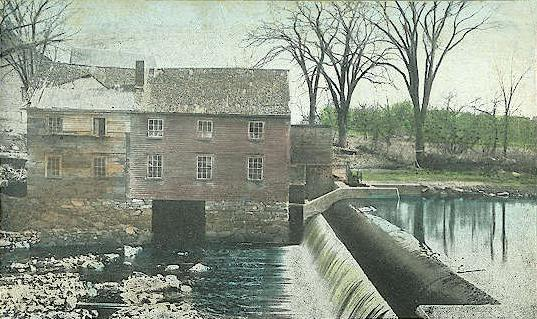
Mill Pond Dam, as depicted on a 1908 postcard

The river passes over Mill Pond Dam near NH Route 108 in Durham where the river reaches tidewater. The dam dates to 1913 and is listed on the New Hampshire State Register of Historic Places, where it is referred to as the Oyster River Dam. Prior wooden dams provided power to sawmills and gristmills dating back to the mid-1600s. As of February 2019, the dam was being considered for removal, due to the cost of potential repair work and water quality issues with the Mill Pond, which the dam creates. In November 2020, consultants with Vanasse Hangen Brustlin, Inc. (VHB) advised that the dam should either be removed or stabilized, and that taking no action would leave "the community at risk for a future safety issue.” A news report in January 2021 cited cost estimates of $4 million for stabilization vs. $1.3 million for removal. In September 2021, the Durham town council voted to remove the dam. Following a citizens' initiative, in March 2022, voters town-wide upheld the decision to remove the dam.

== Water use ==
The Oyster River is a significant source of drinking water for the town of Durham and the University of New Hampshire. The extent to which the Oyster River can be used as a resource is being stretched more and more as the population increases within the area. Residential water usage in the area is expected to increase by 54% from 2003 to 2025, and non-domestic usage, for example commercial, industrial, irrigation and mining, is expected to increase 62%. Thus, the Oyster River is going to become an even more essential resource to the community.

== Conservation issues ==
The river crosses under heavily-traveled U.S. Route 4 in three separate places in the town of Lee and passes within 1,000 feet (300 m) of the busy Lee Traffic Circle, which poses an ecological threat if runoff from the road gets into the water. Along the river there remain stretches of untouched floodplain and forests that stretch on for almost 100 acres (40 ha). These floodplain areas are useful in holding excess water during severe weather and help to reduce the damage done to the infrastructure elsewhere along the river. The floodplains also house diverse ecological communities and are home to many diverse species of New Hampshire.

One species that has been greatly affected by the steady decline in the health of the Oyster River is the oyster itself. Due to siltation and water pollution in the river, the population of oysters hit an all-time low in 2000 at 6,174 US bushels (217,600 L). However, the rate rebounded to 10,044 US bushels (353,900 L) just a couple years later. Another species that lives in the Oyster River is the American Brook Lamprey (Lampetra appendix), which only exists in this river in the entire state. The river as a whole is home to seven fish species of concern.

== See also ==
- List of rivers of New Hampshire

== Sources ==
- Brooks, Paul (1991). The Natural Wonders of a New England River Valley A World Alive. University of New Hampshire Library: Yankee Books. pp. 1–15 129–148.
