= Simms Stream =

River in New Hampshire, United States

- Location within New Hampshire Location within the United States

Location
- Country: United States
- State: New Hampshire
- County: Coos
- Town: Columbia

Physical characteristics
- Source
  - location: Columbia
  - coordinates: 44°48′52″N 71°22′40″W
  - elevation: 2,400 ft (730 m)
- Mouth: Connecticut River
  - location: Columbia
  - coordinates: 44°52′46″N 71°31′19″W
  - elevation: 990 ft (300 m)
- Length: 10.4 mi (16.7 km)

Basin features
- Tributaries
  - left: Moran Brook, Bog Brook, Uran Brook, West Branch
  - right: East Branch

Simms Stream is a 10.4-mile-long (16.7 km) river in northern New Hampshire in the United States. It is a tributary of the Connecticut River, which flows south to Long Island Sound, an arm of the Atlantic Ocean.

Simms Stream is located entirely in the town of Columbia, New Hampshire. It rises near Gadwah Notch in the eastern part of Columbia and flows northwest through logging and farming country to the Connecticut River near the border between Columbia and Colebrook.

== See also ==
- List of New Hampshire rivers
