= List of rivers of New Hampshire =

This is a list of rivers and significant streams in the U.S. state of New Hampshire.

All watercourses named "River" (freshwater or tidal) are listed here, as well as other streams which are either subject to the New Hampshire Comprehensive Shoreland Protection Act or are more than 10 miles (16 km) long. New Hampshire rivers and streams qualify for state shoreland protection (and are listed here in bold) if they are fourth-order or larger water bodies, based on the Strahler method of stream order classification.

== By drainage basin ==
All New Hampshire rivers ultimately flow to the Atlantic Ocean. The list is sorted by major drainage basin, running from north to south along the Atlantic coast, with respective tributaries arranged based on their entry into the main stream from mouth to source. Where several tributaries enter a single lake, they are listed running clockwise from the lake outlet.

=== Androscoggin River ===
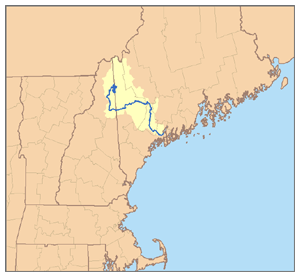
Androscoggin River watershed

- **Androscoggin River**
  - **Wild River**
  - Rattle River
  - **Peabody River**
    - West Branch Peabody River
  - Moose River
  - **Moose Brook**
  - Dead River
  - Chickwolnepy Stream
  - Mollidgewock Brook
  - Clear Stream
  - **Magalloway River**
    - **Dead Diamond River**
      - **Swift Diamond River**
      - Little Dead Diamond River
        - South Branch Little Dead Diamond River
        - West Branch Little Dead Diamond River
      - **West Branch Dead Diamond River**
      - Middle Branch Dead Diamond River
        - **East Branch Dead Diamond River**
    - Little Magalloway River
      - Middle Branch Little Magalloway River
        - West Branch Little Magalloway River
    - West Branch Magalloway River

=== Saco River ===
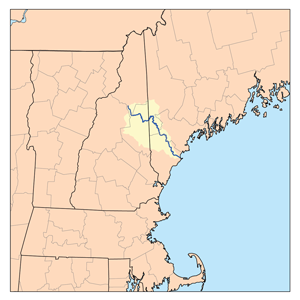
Saco River watershed

- **Saco River**
  - **Ossipee River**
    - South River
    - Ossipee Lake
      - **Pine River**
        - Beech River
          - Dan Hole River
      - Lovell River
      - **Bearcamp River**
        - Chocorua River
        - Swift River (Bearcamp River tributary)
          - Mill Brook
          - Wonalancet River
        - Cold River (Bearcamp River tributary)
          - Whiteface River
            - East Branch Whiteface River
      - West Branch
        - Deer River
  - Shepards River
  - Cold River (Maine – New Hampshire)
    - Little Cold River
    - Mad River
      - South Branch Mad River
      - Middle Branch Mad River
  - **Swift River (Saco River tributary)**
    - **Pequawket Brook**
  - East Branch Saco River
    - East Fork East Branch Saco River
  - Ellis River
    - Wildcat Brook
    - New River
    - Cutler River
  - Rocky Branch
  - Sawyer River
  - Dry River

=== Piscataqua River and New Hampshire Atlantic coast ===
- Piscataqua River (tidal)
  - Great Bay (tidal)
    - **Bellamy River**
    - Oyster River
      - Bunker Creek
    - Winnicut River
    - Squamscott River (tidal)
      - **Exeter River**
        - Little River (Exeter, New Hampshire)
        - Little River (Brentwood, New Hampshire)
    - **Lamprey River**
      - Piscassic River
        - Fresh River
      - Little River (Lamprey River tributary)
      - **North River**
        - **Bean River**
      - Pawtuckaway River
      - North Branch River
  - **Cocheco River**
    - **Isinglass River**
      - Berrys River
    - Rattlesnake River
    - Mad River
    - Ela River
  - **Salmon Falls River**
    - Branch River
      - Jones Brook
- Little River
- Hampton River (tidal)
  - Blackwater River (tidal)
  - Browns River
  - Hampton Falls River
  - Taylor River
    - Drakes River
    - Old River

=== Merrimack River ===
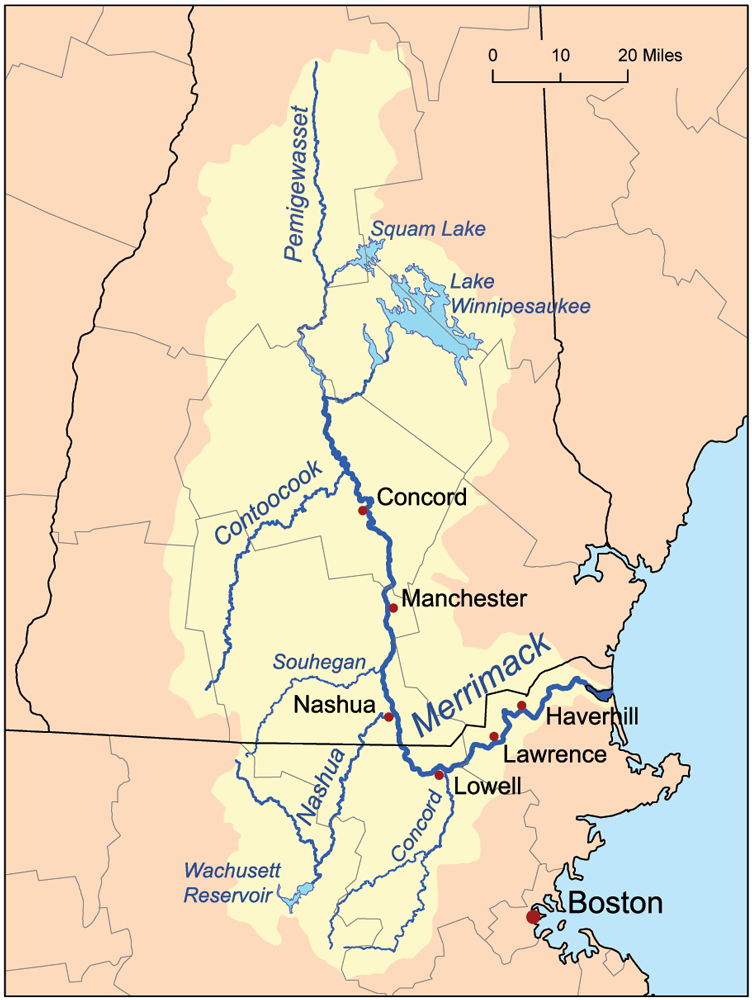
Merrimack River watershed

- **Merrimack River**
  - Powwow River
    - Back River
  - Little River
  - **Spicket River**
  - **Beaver Brook**
  - Salmon Brook
  - **Nashua River**
    - **Nissitissit River**
  - **Souhegan River**
    - **Baboosic Brook**
    - Purgatory Brook
    - **Stony Brook**
    - South Branch Souhegan River
    - West Branch Souhegan River
  - **Cohas Brook**
    - **Sucker Brook**
      - **Little Massabesic Brook**
  - **Piscataquog River**
    - **South Branch Piscataquog River**
      - Middle Branch Piscataquog River
  - Black Brook
  - **Suncook River**
    - Bear Brook
    - Little Suncook River
    - Big River
      - Little River
  - **Soucook River**
  - **Turkey River**
  - **Contoocook River**
    - **Blackwater River**
      - **Frazier Brook**
    - **Warner River**
      - Lane River
      - West Branch Warner River
    - **North Branch Contoocook River**
      - Beards Brook
        - Shedd Brook
    - **Nubanusit Brook**
    - Gridley River
  - **Pemigewasset River**
    - **Smith River**
    - **Newfound River**
      - Newfound Lake
        - **Fowler River**
        - Cockermouth River
    - Squam River
    - **Baker River**
      - **South Branch Baker River**
      - East Branch Baker River
    - Beebe River
    - Mad River
      - West Branch Mad River
    - **Moosilauke Brook**
      - Lost River
    - **East Branch Pemigewasset River**
      - North Fork East Branch Pemigewasset River
  - **Winnipesaukee River**
    - Tioga River
    - Lake Winnipesaukee
      - Red Hill River
      - Melvin River
      - Merrymeeting River
      - Gunstock River

=== Connecticut River ===
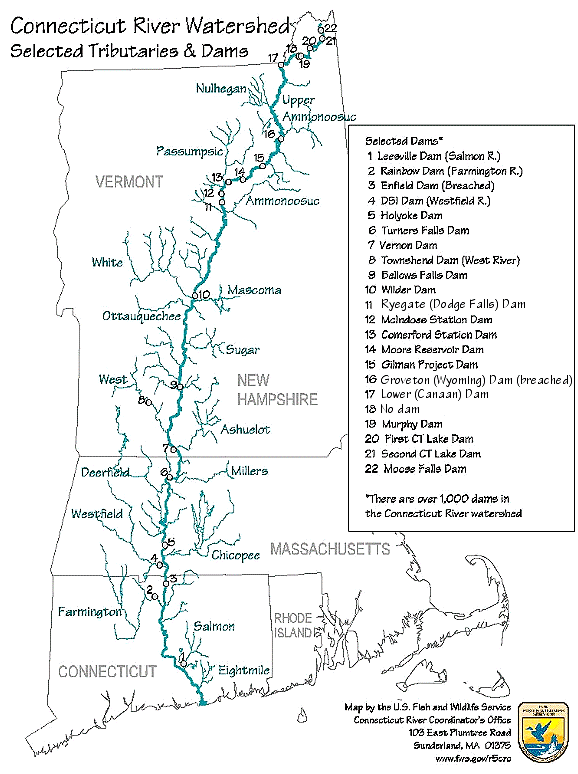
Connecticut River watershed

- **Connecticut River**
  - Millers River
    - Tarbell Brook
    - North Branch Millers River
  - **Ashuelot River**
    - **Mirey Brook**
    - **South Branch Ashuelot River**
    - **The Branch**
      - Otter Brook
  - **Partridge Brook**
  - **Cold River**
    - Great Brook
  - Little Sugar River
  - **Sugar River**
    - **North Branch Sugar River**
      - **Stocker Brook**
    - South Branch Sugar River
  - Blow-me-down Brook
  - **Mascoma River**
    - Knox River
    - Indian River
  - **Mink Brook**
  - Oliverian Brook
  - **Ammonoosuc River**
    - Wild Ammonoosuc River
    - **Gale River**
      - Ham Branch
      - North Branch Gale River
      - South Branch Gale River
    - Little River
    - Zealand River
  - Johns River
  - **Israel River**
    - South Branch Israel River
  - **Upper Ammonoosuc River**
    - Nash Stream
    - Phillips Brook
    - North Branch Upper Ammonoosuc River
    - West Branch Upper Ammonoosuc River
  - Simms Stream
  - **Mohawk River**
    - East Branch Mohawk River
    - West Branch Mohawk River
  - Halls Stream
  - Indian Stream
  - Perry Stream

== Alphabetically ==
- **Ammonoosuc River**
- **Androscoggin River**
- **Ashuelot River**
- **Baboosic Brook**
- Back River
- **Baker River**
- **Bean River**
- Bear Brook
- **Bearcamp River**
- Beards Brook
- **Beaver Brook**
- Beebe River
- Beech River
- **Bellamy River**
- Berrys River
- Big River
- Black Brook
- **Blackwater River (Contoocook River tributary)**
- Blackwater River (Massachusetts-New Hampshire)
- Blow-me-down Brook
- Branch River
- Browns River
- Bunker Creek
- Chickwolnepy Stream
- Clear Stream
- Chocorua River
- **Cocheco River**
- Cockermouth River
- **Cohas Brook**
- Cold River (Bearcamp River tributary)
- **Cold River (Connecticut River tributary)**
- Cold River (Maine – New Hampshire)
- **Connecticut River**
- **Contoocook River**
- Cutler River
- Dan Hole River
- Dead River
- **Dead Diamond River**
- Deer River
- Drakes River
- Dry River
- East Branch Baker River
- **East Branch Dead Diamond River**
- East Branch Mohawk River
- **East Branch Pemigewasset River**
- East Branch Saco River
- East Branch Whiteface River
- East Fork East Branch Saco River
- Ela River
- Ellis River
- **Exeter River**
- **Fowler River**
- **Frazier Brook**
- Fresh River
- **Gale River**
- Great Brook
- Gridley River
- Gunstock River
- Halls Stream
- Ham Branch
- Hampton River
- Hampton Falls River
- Indian River
- Indian Stream
- **Isinglass River**
- **Israel River**
- Johns River
- Jones Brook
- Knox River
- **Lamprey River**
- Lane River
- Little River (Ammonoosuc River tributary)
- Little River (Big River tributary)
- Little River (Brentwood, New Hampshire)
- Little River (Exeter, New Hampshire)
- Little River (Lamprey River tributary)
- Little River (Merrimack River tributary)
- Little River (New Hampshire Atlantic coast)
- Little Cold River
- Little Dead Diamond River
- Little Magalloway River
- **Little Massabesic Brook**
- Little Sugar River
- Little Suncook River
- Lost River
- Lovell River
- Mad River (Cocheco River tributary)
- Mad River (Cold River tributary)
- Mad River (Pemigewasset River tributary)
- **Magalloway River**
- **Mascoma River**
- Melvin River
- **Merrimack River**
- Merrymeeting River
- Middle Branch Dead Diamond River
- Middle Branch Little Magalloway River
- Middle Branch Mad River
- Middle Branch Piscataquog River
- Mill Brook
- **Mink Brook**
- **Mirey Brook**
- **Mohawk River**
- Mollidgewock Brook
- **Moose Brook**
- Moose River
- **Moosilauke Brook**
- Nash Stream
- **Nashua River**
- New River
- **Newfound River**
- **Nissitissit River**
- **North River**
- North Branch River
- **North Branch Contoocook River**
- North Branch Gale River
- North Branch Millers River
- **North Branch Sugar River**
- North Branch Upper Ammonoosuc River
- North Fork East Branch Pemigewasset River
- **Nubanusit Brook**
- Old River
- Oliverian Brook
- **Ossipee River**
- Otter Brook
- Oyster River
- **Partridge Brook**
- Pawtuckaway River
- **Peabody River**
- **Pemigewasset River**
- **Pequawket Brook**
- Perry Stream
- Phillips Brook
- **Pine River**
- Piscassic River
- Piscataqua River
- **Piscataquog River**
- Powwow River
- Purgatory Brook
- Rattle River
- Rattlesnake River
- Red Hill River
- Rocky Branch
- **Saco River**
- Salmon Brook
- **Salmon Falls River**
- Sawyer River
- Shedd Brook
- Shepards River
- Simms Stream
- **Smith River**
- **Soucook River**
- **Souhegan River**
- South River
- **South Branch Ashuelot River**
- **South Branch Baker River**
- South Branch Gale River
- South Branch Israel River
- South Branch Little Dead Diamond River
- South Branch Mad River
- **South Branch Piscataquog River**
- South Branch Souhegan River
- South Branch Sugar River
- **Spicket River**
- Squam River
- Squamscott River
- **Stocker Brook**
- **Stony Brook**
- **Sucker Brook**
- **Sugar River**
- **Suncook River**
- Swift River (Bearcamp River tributary)
- **Swift River (Saco River tributary)**
- **Swift Diamond River**
- Tarbell Brook
- Taylor River
- **The Branch**
- Tioga River
- **Turkey River**
- **Upper Ammonoosuc River**
- **Warner River**
- West Branch (New Hampshire)
- **West Branch Dead Diamond River**
- West Branch Little Dead Diamond River
- West Branch Little Magalloway River
- West Branch Mad River
- West Branch Magalloway River
- West Branch Mohawk River
- West Branch Peabody River
- West Branch Souhegan River
- West Branch Upper Ammonoosuc River
- West Branch Warner River
- Whiteface River
- **Wild River**
- Wild Ammonoosuc River
- Wildcat Brook
- Winnicut River
- **Winnipesaukee River**
- Wonalancet River
- Zealand River

== See also ==
- Outline of New Hampshire
- List of National Wild and Scenic Rivers in New Hampshire
- List of rivers of the United States
