= North Branch River =

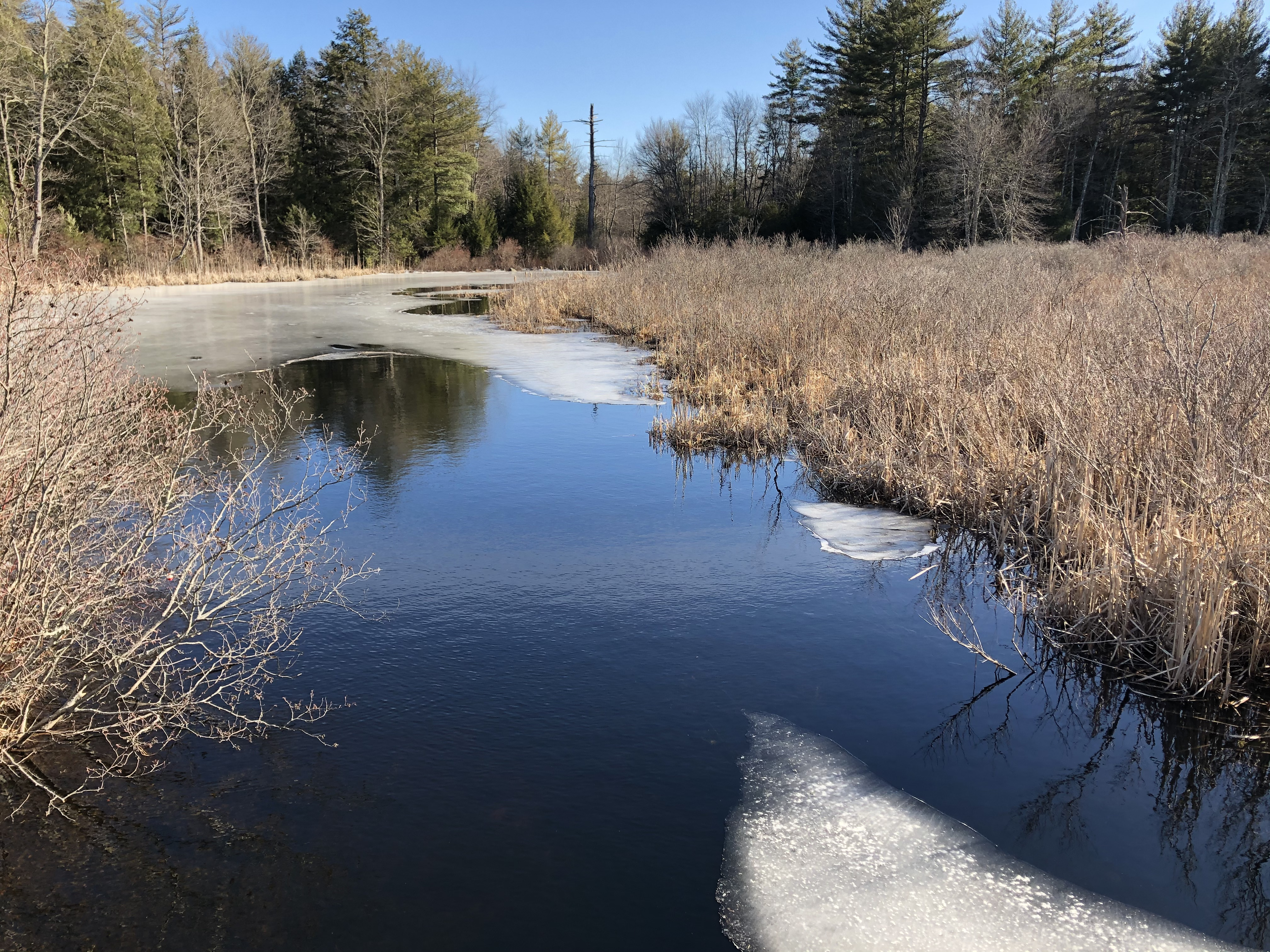
- The North Branch at New Boston Road in Candia, NH

- Location within New Hampshire Location within the United States

Location
- Country: United States
- State: New Hampshire
- County: Rockingham
- Towns: Deerfield, Candia, Raymond

Physical characteristics
- Source: Beaver Pond
  - location: Deerfield
  - coordinates: 43°6′25″N 71°19′41″W
  - elevation: 484 ft (148 m)
- Mouth: Lamprey River
  - location: Raymond
  - coordinates: 43°3′39″N 71°13′37″W
  - elevation: 202 ft (62 m)
- Length: 8.2 mi (13.2 km)

The North Branch River is an 8.2-mile-long (13.2 km) river in southeastern New Hampshire in the United States. It is a tributary of the Lamprey River, part of the Great Bay and Piscataqua River watershed leading to the Atlantic Ocean.

The river begins in Bear Brook State Park, in Deerfield, New Hampshire, at the outlet to Beaver Pond. Flowing southeast, it quickly leaves the park, then enters the town of Candia. It passes under New Hampshire Route 43 just south of the village of Candia, then reaches NH 27 just before entering the town of Raymond, where the river ends at the Lamprey River.

== See also ==
- List of rivers of New Hampshire
