= Rattle River =

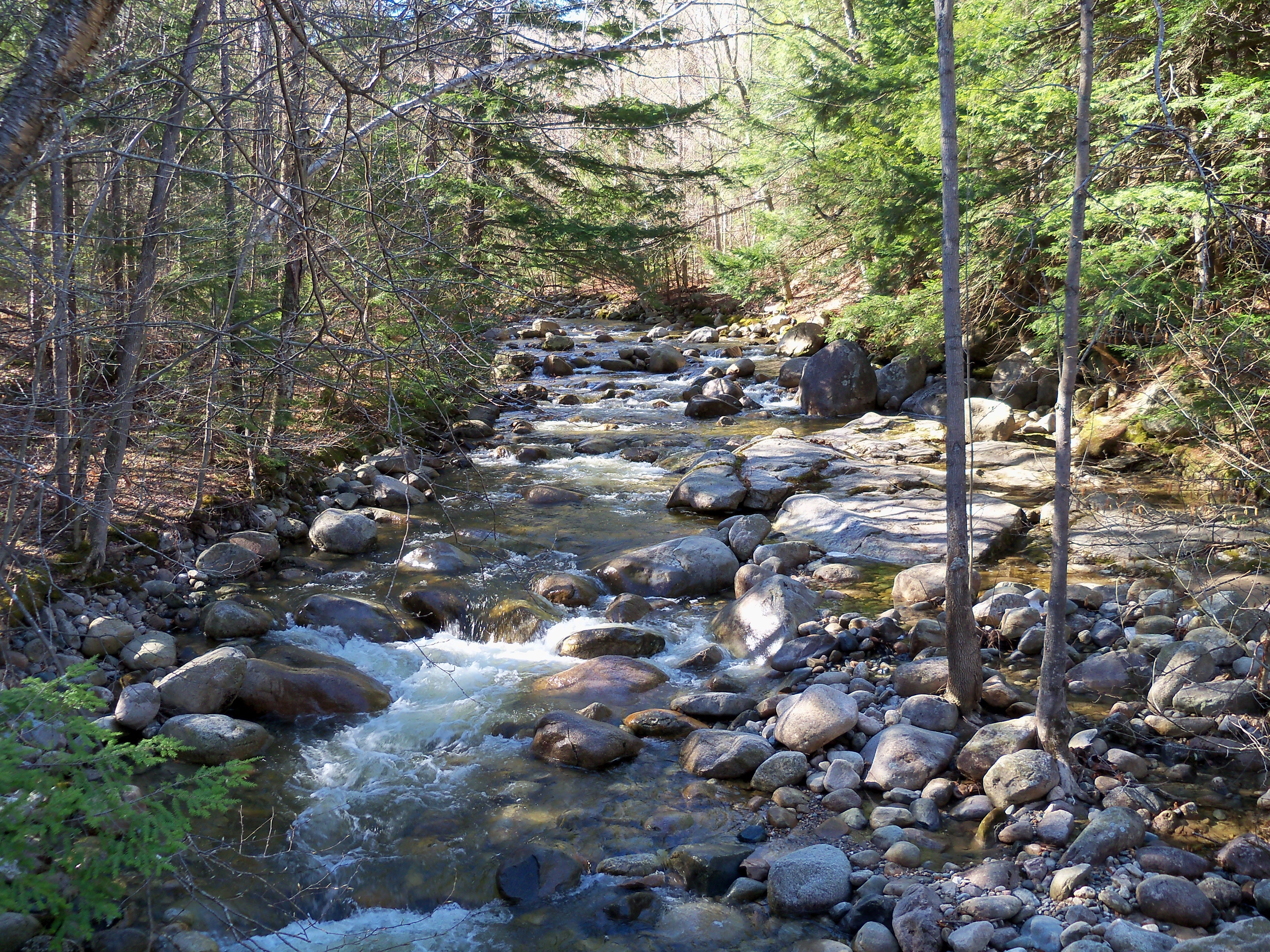

- Location within New Hampshire Location within the United States

Location
- Country: United States
- State: New Hampshire
- County: Coos
- Town: Shelburne

Physical characteristics
- Source: Middle Moriah Mountain
  - location: White Mountain National Forest
  - coordinates: 44°21′11″N 71°6′45″W
  - elevation: 2,770 ft (840 m)
- Mouth: Androscoggin River
  - location: Shelburne
  - coordinates: 44°24′18″N 71°6′40″W
  - elevation: 710 ft (220 m)
- Length: 4.1 mi (6.6 km)

The Rattle River is a 4.1-mile-long (6.6 km) river in the White Mountains of New Hampshire in the United States. It is a tributary of the Androscoggin River, which flows east into Maine, joining the Kennebec River close to the Atlantic Ocean.

The Rattle River rises in the saddle between Middle Moriah and Shelburne Moriah Mountain in the town of Shelburne, within the White Mountain National Forest. The river (better described as a large brook) flows north to the Androscoggin, dropping from 2,800 feet (850 m) to 700 feet (210 m) above sea level over its length.

The Appalachian Trail follows the river from its source to the Androscoggin River valley.

== See also ==
- List of rivers of New Hampshire
