= Rocky Branch (New Hampshire) =

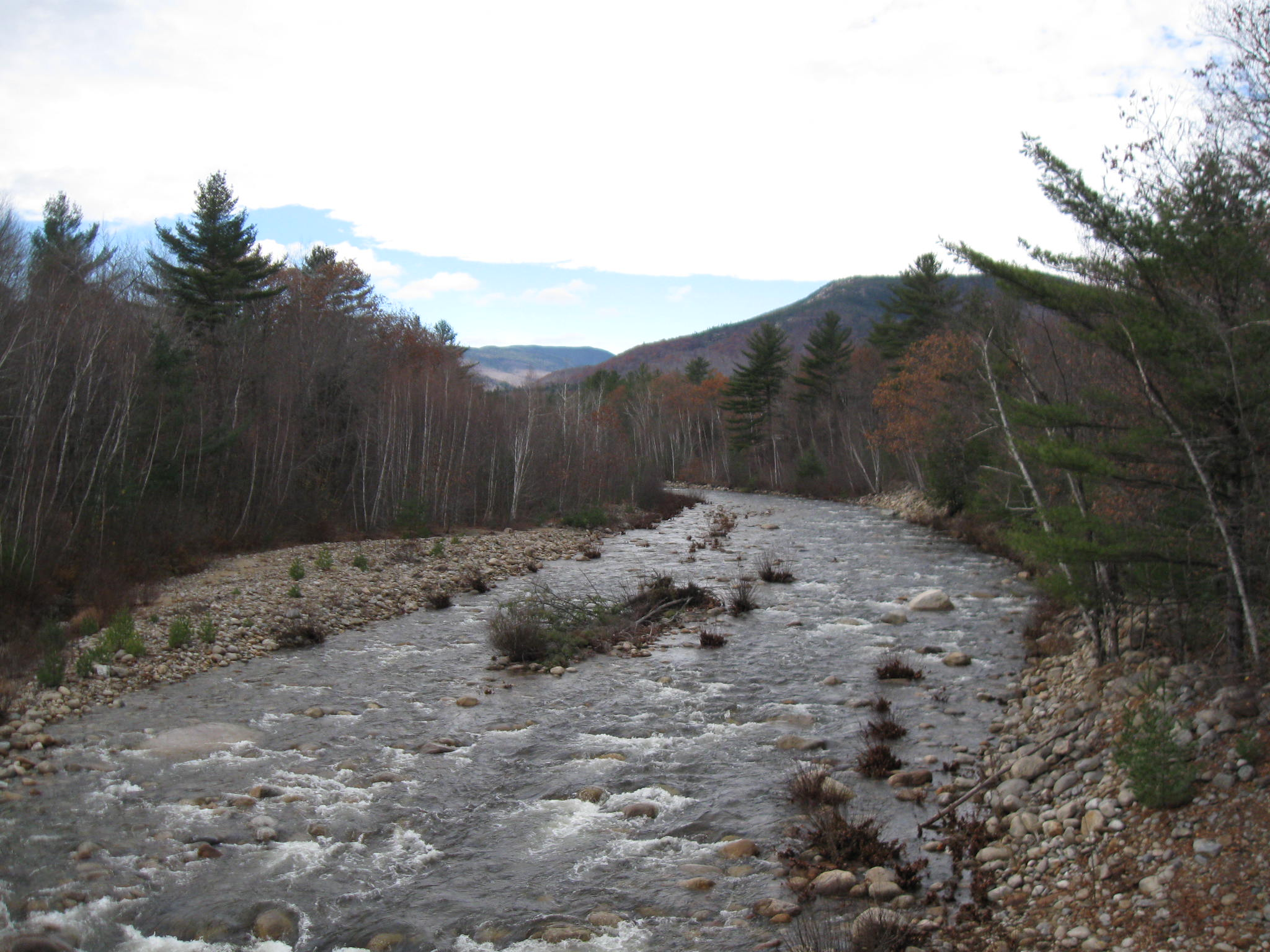
- The Rocky Branch at U.S. Route 302 in Bartlett, NH

- Location within New Hampshire Location within the United States

Location
- Country: United States
- State: New Hampshire
- Counties: Coos, Carroll
- Towns and townships: Cutts Grant, Sargents Purchase, Jackson, Bartlett

Physical characteristics
- Source: Presidential Range Dry River Wilderness
  - location: Cutts Grant
  - coordinates: 44°14′1″N 71°17′45″W
  - elevation: 3,910 ft (1,190 m)
- Mouth: Saco River
  - location: Bartlett
  - coordinates: 44°6′9″N 71°11′50″W
  - elevation: 550 ft (170 m)
- Length: 13.1 mi (21.1 km)

Basin features
- Tributaries
  - right: Upper Stairs Brook, Lower Stairs Brook

The Rocky Branch is a 13.1-mile-long (21.1 km) river in the White Mountains of New Hampshire in the United States. It is a tributary of the Saco River, which flows to the Atlantic Ocean in Maine.

The Rocky Branch rises in the Presidential Range Dry River Wilderness Area of the White Mountain National Forest on the southernmost slopes of Mount Washington. The river drops rapidly to the south through a valley between Montalban Ridge (with the peaks of Mount Isolation and Stairs Mountain) to the west and the lower Rocky Branch Ridge to the east. Turning more to the southeast, the river leaves the national forest and enters the town of Bartlett, New Hampshire, where it joins the Saco River after passing under U.S. Route 302.

The Rocky Branch Railroad supported a logging operation in the valley from 1908 to 1913. The rails were removed in 1914 after the area was ravaged by wildfires.

== See also ==
- List of rivers of New Hampshire
