= Black Brook (Merrimack River tributary) =

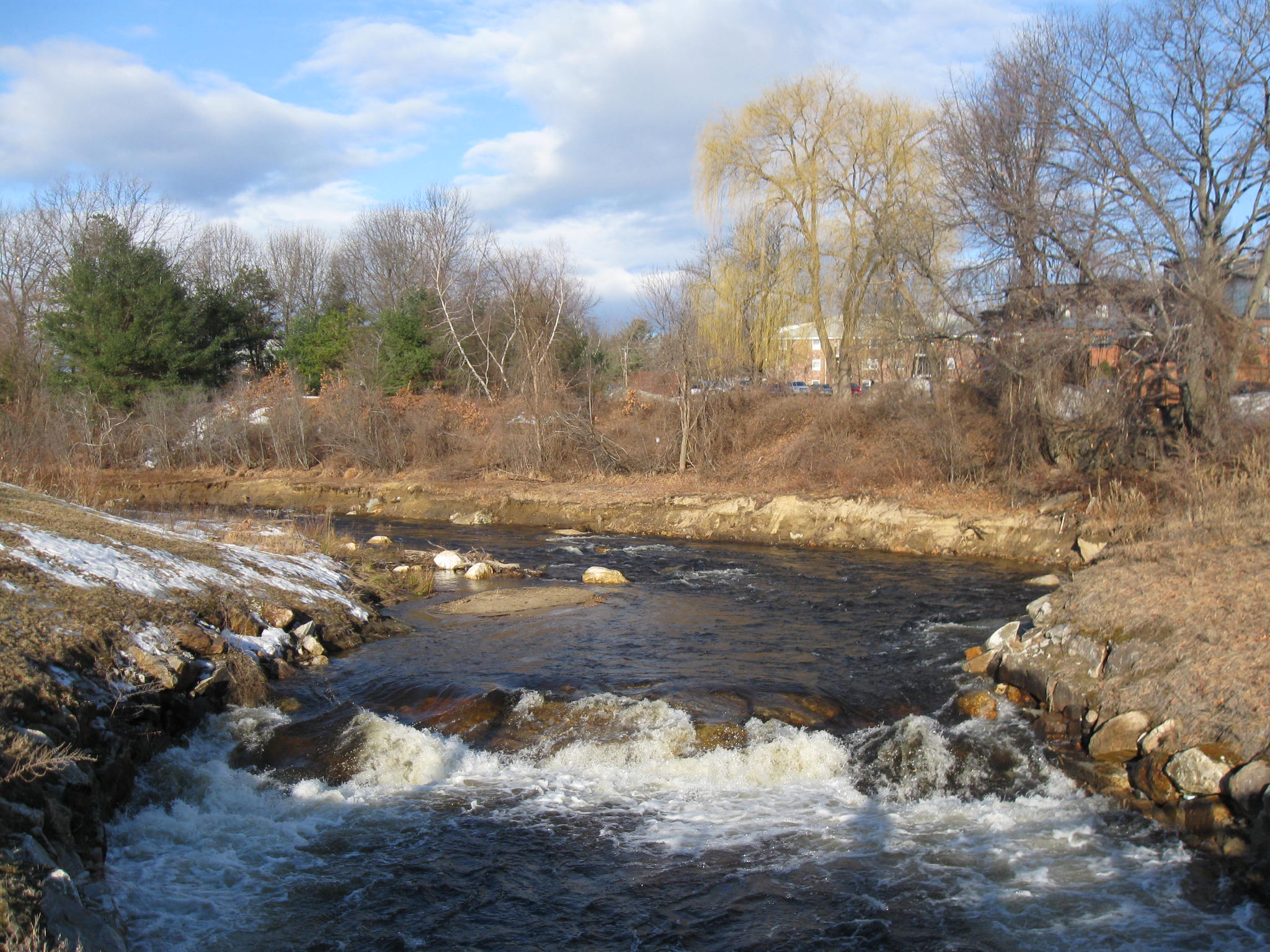
- Black Brook at site of former dam in Manchester, NH (2011)

- Location within New Hampshire Location within the United States

Location
- Country: United States
- State: New Hampshire
- Counties: Merrimack, Hillsborough
- Municipalities: Dunbarton, Goffstown, Manchester

Physical characteristics
- Source: Kimball Pond
  - location: Dunbarton
  - coordinates: 43°4′54″N 71°34′31″W
  - elevation: 494 ft (151 m)
- Mouth: Merrimack River
  - location: Manchester
  - coordinates: 43°0′34″N 71°28′31″W
  - elevation: 175 ft (53 m)
- Length: 11.4 mi (18.3 km)

Black Brook is an 11.4-mile-long (18.3 km) stream located in southern New Hampshire in the United States. It is a tributary of the Merrimack River, which flows to the Gulf of Maine.

Black Brook begins at the outlet of Kimball Pond in Dunbarton, New Hampshire. The brook travels southeast into Goffstown and then Manchester, joining the Merrimack just upstream from Amoskeag Falls.

== See also ==
- List of rivers of New Hampshire
