= Saco River =

River in New Hampshire and Maine, United States

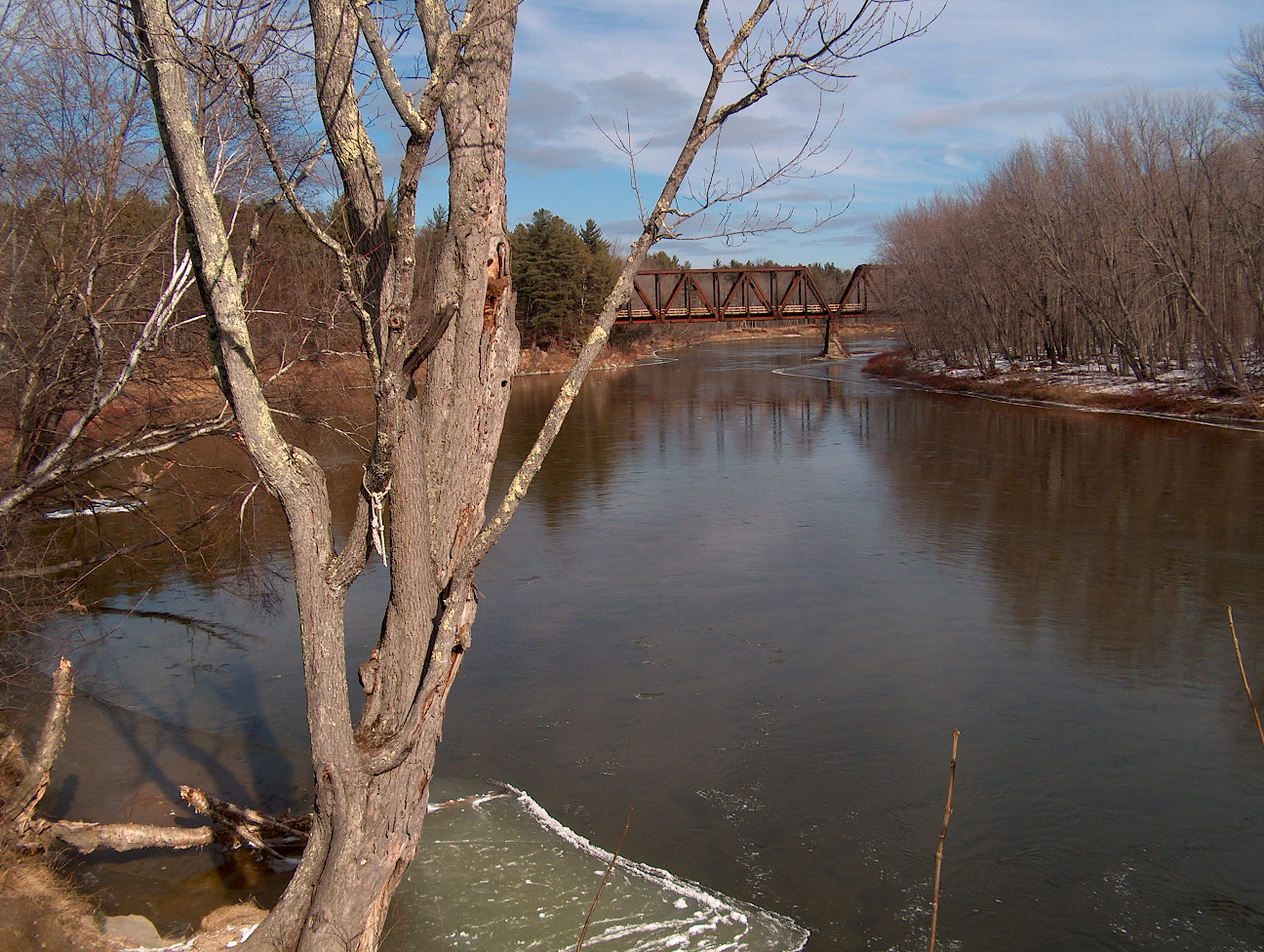
- The Saco River in Conway, New Hampshire

- Location within Maine Location within New Hampshire Location within the United States

Location
- Country: United States
- States: New Hampshire, Maine
- Counties: Coos, NH, Carroll, NH, Oxford, ME, Cumberland, ME, York, ME
- Towns and cities: Conway, NH, Fryeburg, ME, Saco, ME, Biddeford, ME

Physical characteristics
- Source: Saco Lake
  - location: Crawford Notch, White Mountains, NH
  - coordinates: 44°12′58″N 71°24′31″W
  - elevation: 1,887 ft (575 m)
- Mouth: Saco Bay, Gulf of Maine, Atlantic Ocean
  - location: Biddeford/Saco, ME
  - coordinates: 43°27′42″N 70°21′20″W
  - elevation: 0 ft (0 m)
- Length: 136 mi (219 km)
- Basin size: 1,703 sq mi (4,410 km^{2})

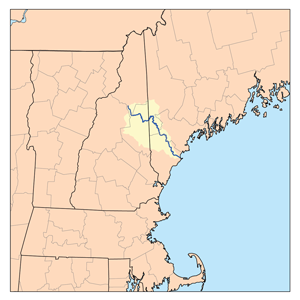
The Saco River watershed

The Saco River (/ˈsɑːkoʊ/ SAH-koh, Abenaki: Sαkóhki) is a river in northeastern New Hampshire and southwestern Maine in the United States. It drains a rural area of 1,703 square miles (4,410 km^{2}) of forests and farmlands west and southwest of Portland, emptying into the Atlantic Ocean at Saco Bay, 136 miles (219 km) from its source. It supplies drinking water to roughly 250,000 people in thirty-five towns; and historically provided transportation and water power encouraging development of the cities of Biddeford and Saco and the towns of Fryeburg and Hiram.

Samuel de Champlain sailed a portion of the river in 1605 and referred to it as Chouacoet, which he said was the name used by the Almouchiquois people. Various sources also give their name as "Sokoki" (a term also used for the Missiquoi people of western New England) and as being either the ancestors or close relatives of the Pequawket who lived along the river near present-day Fryeburg. William O. Bright attributed the origin of "Saco" to an Eastern Abenaki language word meaning "land where the river comes out", which he connected to similar place names like Saugus, said to come from the Pawtucket word for "outlet".

== Course ==
The river rises at Saco Lake in Crawford Notch in the White Mountains and flows generally south-southeast through Bartlett and Conway in Carroll County, New Hampshire before crossing into Oxford County, Maine.

Shortly after entering Fryeburg, Maine, the river branches into the "Old Course" Saco River and the more commonly used "Canal River". Constructed in the 1800s to be more convenient for farmers, the 6-mile-long (10 km) canal is 15 miles (24 km) shorter than the old course and is now considered to be the official course for the river, as the upstream end of the old course is largely silted over. The two channels merge again near Lovell, Maine.

After running through six hydropower stations operated by NextEra Energy Resources (including Skelton Dam and Bonny Eagle Dam), the river enters York County, crosses under Interstate 95, and passes between Saco and Biddeford, where it is bridged by U.S. Route 1. It enters Saco Bay on the Atlantic with Camp Ellis in Saco on the north shore and Hills Beach in Biddeford on the south shore.

== Stream flow ==
The United States government maintains three stream gauges on the Saco River. The first is at Bartlett, New Hampshire (44°05′02″N 71°17′08″W), then in Conway, New Hampshire (43°59′27″N 71°05′29″W), where the river's watershed is 385 square miles (997 km^{2}). Discharge (stream flow) here averages 962 cubic feet per second (27.2 m^{3}/s) and has ranged from a minimum of 40 cubic feet per second (1.1 m^{3}/s) to a maximum of 47,200 cubic feet per second (1,340 m^{3}/s). The third is at Cornish, Maine (43°48′29″N 70°46′53″W) where the watershed is 1,293 square miles (3,350 km^{2}). Flow here averages 2,756 cubic feet per second (78.0 m^{3}/s) and has ranged from a minimum of 244 cubic feet per second (6.9 m^{3}/s) to a maximum of 46,600 cubic feet per second (1,320 m^{3}/s).

== Attractions ==
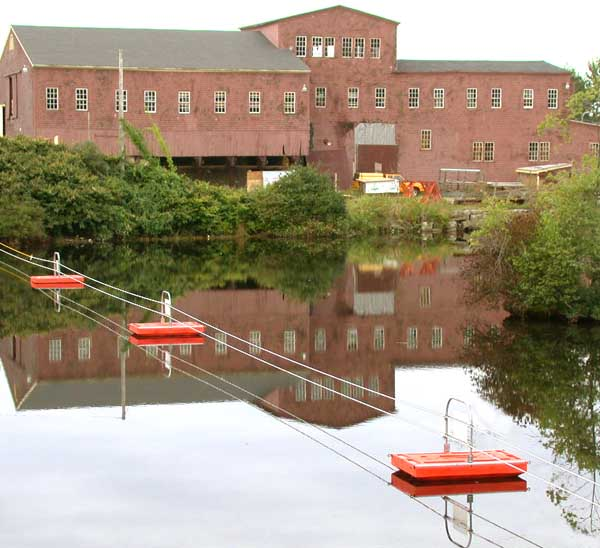
The Saco River at Saco, Maine, seen from the bridge over U.S. Route 1

The Saco is a popular recreational river, drawing an estimated 3,000 to 7,000 people per summer weekend, mostly on the stretch from Swan's Falls (a campground formerly maintained by the Appalachian Mountain Club and now maintained by the Saco River Recreation Council) to Brownfield, Maine.

There are many sand beaches along the Saco when not at flood stage, and camping is allowed along some of these beaches for free. Misuse, including large quantities of garbage left behind by users and illegal fires, as well as discourtesy toward landowners, has led many beaches to be posted and monitored. A permit is required from the State of Maine for campfires along any unposted river beaches.

The Saco is a major attraction for canoeists. One area of the river, Walker's Rip, is a set of rapids that has caused less talented canoers to capsize, although it can be navigated successfully. Several canoeing rentals are available throughout the river's distance.

The Saco River is also famous for sport fishing, even though the number of fish in it has decreased tremendously throughout time.

== Problems ==
Multiple violent and reportedly alcohol-related incidents in 2001 led to increased police patrols and efforts by livery companies, landowners, and government agencies to improve conditions.

== Major tributaries ==
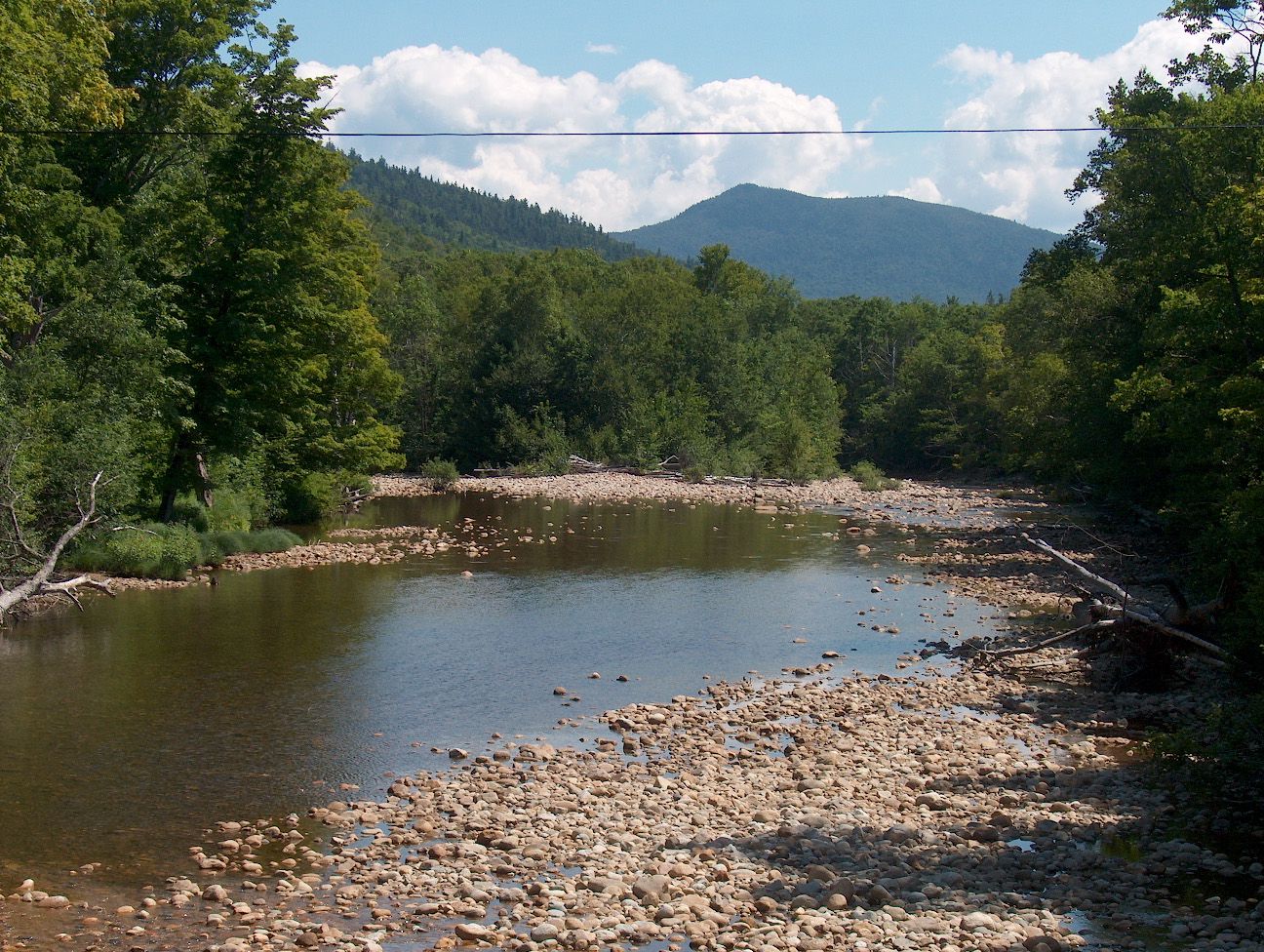
The Saco River in Crawford Notch

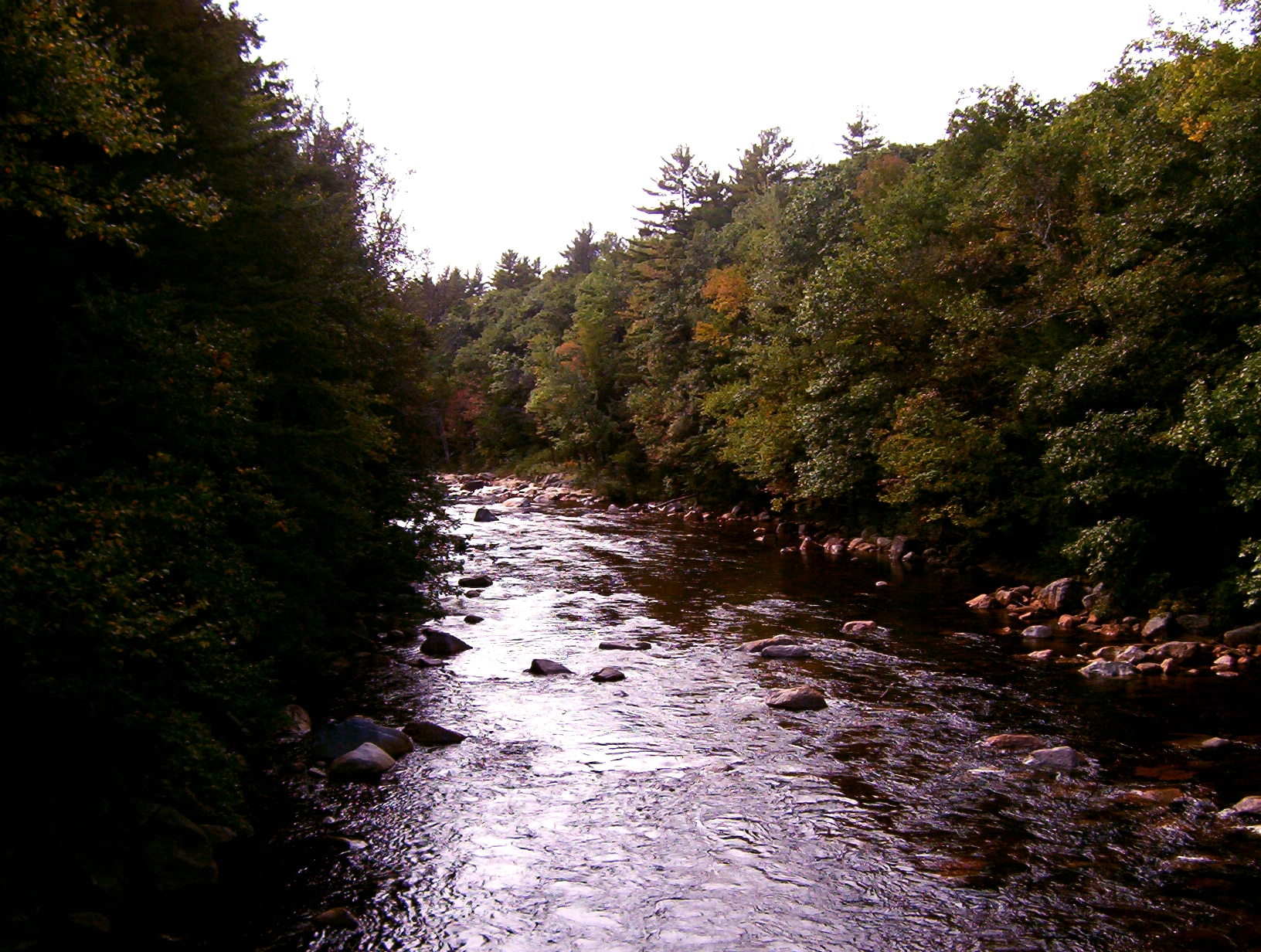
The Saco River from the Covered Bridge Gift Shoppe

Listed from source to mouth:

- Dry River (left)
- Sawyer River (right)
- Rocky Branch (left)
- Ellis River (left)
- East Branch Saco River (left)
- Swift River (right)
- Old Course Saco River (left)
- Shepards River (right)
- Tenmile River (right)
- Hancock Brook (left)
- Ossipee River (right)
- Little Ossipee River (right)

== See also ==
- List of rivers of Maine
- List of rivers of New Hampshire
