= Shepards River =

- Location within Maine Location within New Hampshire Location within the United States

Location
- Country: United States
- States: New Hampshire, Maine
- Counties: Carroll, NH, Oxford, ME
- Towns: Conway, NH, Eaton, NH, Brownfield, ME

Physical characteristics
- Source
  - location: Conway, NH
  - coordinates: 43°56′6″N 71°0′43″W
  - elevation: 840 ft (260 m)
- Mouth: Saco River
  - location: Brownfield, ME
  - coordinates: 43°58′6″N 70°53′47″W
  - elevation: 360 ft (110 m)
- Length: 13.6 mi (21.9 km)

The Shepards River is a 13.6-mile-long (21.9 km) river in western Maine and eastern New Hampshire in the United States. It is part of the Saco River drainage basin.

The Shepards River rises in the town of Conway, New Hampshire, south of Dundee Hill and north of Crown Hill, among foothills of the White Mountains. The river flows southeast across a corner of Eaton, New Hampshire, then turns northeast into Brownfield, Maine, passing the villages of West Brownfield, Brownfield, and East Brownfield before reaching the Saco River east of Frost Mountain.

Several species of game fish have been caught in the Shepards River, including brook trout, rainbow trout, largemouth bass, and atlantic salmon.

== See also ==
- List of rivers of New Hampshire
