= Hancock Brook =

- Location within Maine

Physical characteristics
- Length: 9 miles (14 km)
- Discharge
  - location: Hiram, Maine

Basin features
- River system: Saco River

Hancock Brook is an east-bank tributary to the Saco River at Hiram, Maine. The brook originates in eastern Denmark and flows through a chain of ponds along the border between Hiram and Sebago. The narrow-gauge Bridgton and Saco River Railroad was built along the brook in 1882, and operated until 1941.

== Sand Pond ==
Sand Pond
- Location within Maine
- Location: Denmark, Maine
- Coordinates: 43°56′N 70°45′W
- Max. length: 1.5 mi (2.4 km)
- Surface area: 248 acres (100 ha)
- Max. depth: 44 feet (13 m)
- Water volume: 3,733 acre⋅ft (4,605,000 m^{3})
- Surface elevation: 502 ft (153 m)

The Hancock Brook headwaters flow into Sand Pond (or Walden Pond). The pond is entirely in Denmark. Shoreline development with residences and seasonal cabins has increased algae growth in the pond. The pond supports native populations of rainbow smelt, chain pickerel and smallmouth bass; and has been stocked with largemouth bass, brown trout, and land-locked alewife. A short, narrow thoroughfare connects the south end of Sand Pond to Hancock Pond.

== Hancock Pond ==
Hancock Pond
- Location within Maine
- Location: Maine
- Coordinates: 43°56′N 70°45′W
- Max. length: 1.8 mi (2.9 km)
- Surface area: 761 acres (308 ha)
- Max. depth: 59 feet (18 m)
- Water volume: 14,069 acre⋅ft (17,354,000 m^{3})
- Surface elevation: 502 ft (153 m)

Hancock Pond is the largest pond of the Hancock Brook chain. The narrow-gauge railroad followed the east shore of the pond through West Sebago. The remainder of the pond is in Denmark. The railroad maintained a water tank adjacent to the pond which was a favored stop during summer excursions when passengers would swim in the pond. Subsequent shoreline development with residences and seasonal cabins has caused increased algal blooms in the pond. The pond supports the same fish species found in Sand Pond, since the thoroughfare between the two ponds allows easy passage at similar pond elevations. Hancock Brook overflows a dam at the southwest corner of Hancock Pond into a boggy area including small Mud Pond and crosses the town line from Denmark into Hiram before reaching 34-acre (14 ha) Middle Pond approximately 1 mile (1.6 km) downstream. Hancock Brook downstream of Middle Pond forms the town line between Hiram to the west and Sebago to the east.

== Barker Pond ==
Barker Pond
- Location within Maine
- Location: Maine
- Coordinates: 43°54′N 70°45′W
- Max. length: 1.5 mi (2.4 km)
- Surface area: 260 acres (110 ha)
- Max. depth: 44 feet (13 m)
- Water volume: 4,043 acre⋅ft (4,987,000 m^{3})
- Surface elevation: 492 ft (150 m)

The railroad crossed Hancock Brook at the north end of Barker Pond 1 mile (1.6 km) downstream of Middle Pond, to follow the west shore of Barker Pond. The old railroad grade has been converted to an automobile road known as the Narrow Gauge Trail. Fish swim downstream from Hancock Pond into Barker Pond, but nutrient enrichment causes dissolved oxygen deficiency below the summer thermocline limiting suitability of the pond for trout. Hancock Brook is entirely within the town of Hiram after overflowing a dam at the southwest corner of Barker Pond. Sebago Road and Wards Hill Road cross the brook at Rankins Mill 1 mile (1.6 km) downstream of Barker Pond. A granite masonry arch railroad bridge crossed the brook 1 mile (1.6 km) downstream of Rankins Mill. The last crossing of the brook is by Maine State Route 5 in Hiram just above the confluence with the Saco River.

== Tributaries ==
Southeast Pond
- Location within Maine
- Location: Baldwin, Maine
- Coordinates: 43°53′N 70°45′W
- Max. length: 1 mi (1.6 km)
- Surface area: 162 acres (66 ha)
- Water volume: 1,126 acre⋅ft (1,389,000 m^{3})
- Surface elevation: 495 ft (151 m)

Sucker Brook drains 79-acre (32 ha) Perley Pond and 40-acre (16 ha) Pickerel Pond into the north end of Hancock Pond. With depths of 27 feet (8.2 m) and 18 feet (5.5 m), respectively, these ponds support native populations of chain pickerel and have been stocked with largemouth bass. The Maine Department of Fish and Wildlife has stocked Perley Pond with legal size brook trout for cool weather angling, but these trout are not expected to survive warm summer temperatures.

Southeast Pond drains into Barker Pond from Baldwin.
