= Bunker Creek (New Hampshire) =

- Location within New Hampshire Location within the United States

Location
- Country: United States
- State: New Hampshire
- County: Strafford
- Town: Durham

Physical characteristics
- Source
  - location: Durham
  - coordinates: 43°8′31″N 70°53′16″W
  - elevation: 10 ft (3.0 m)
- Mouth: Oyster River
  - location: Durham
  - coordinates: 43°8′0″N 70°53′11″W
  - elevation: 0 ft (0 m)
- Length: 0.7 mi (1.1 km)

Bunker Creek is a stream in the town of Durham, Strafford County, New Hampshire, United States. It is a 0.7 mile (1.1 km) tributary of the tidal Oyster River. It was named for James Bunker, who built a garrison here in the 1650s.

== See also ==
- List of rivers of New Hampshire
