= Old Course Saco River =

Coordinates: 44.12507°N 70.92896°W

Location
- Country: United States

Physical characteristics
- Source
  - location: Maine

The Old Course Saco River is a 21.9-mile-long (35.2 km) river in the towns of Fryeburg and Lovell in western Maine in the United States. It was the route of the Saco River until the early 1800s, when the river's current course (called at first the "Canal River") was dug to shorten its length considerably.

== See also ==
- List of rivers of Maine
