= Warren, New Hampshire =

Town in New Hampshire, United States

- Town
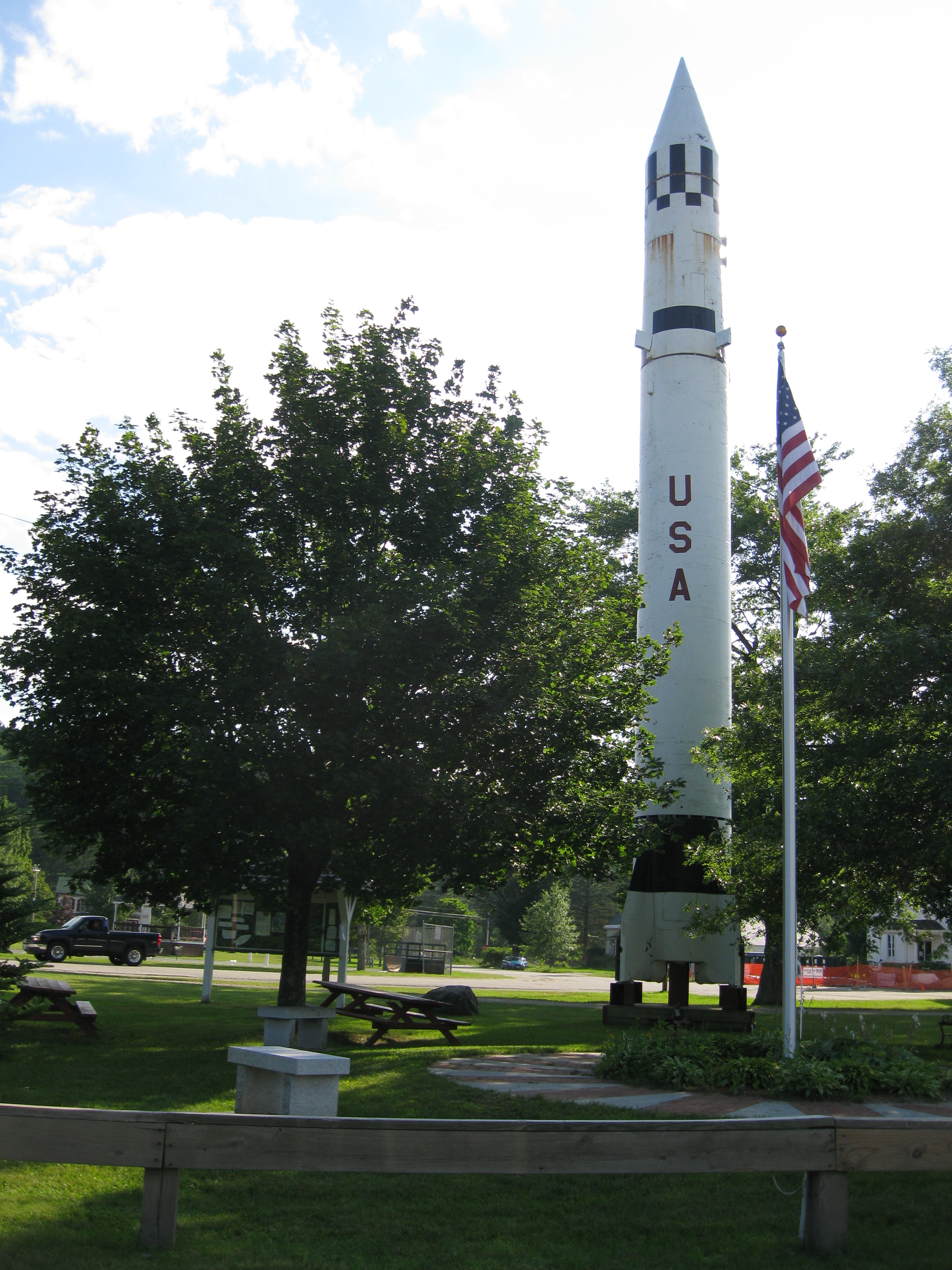
- Redstone missile on the Common

- Seal

- Location in Grafton County, New Hampshire
- Coordinates: 43°56′43″N 71°52′56″W
- Country: United States
- State: New Hampshire
- County: Grafton
- Incorporated: 1763
- Villages: Warren; Glencliff

Area
  - Total: 49.0 sq mi (126.9 km^{2})
  - Land: 48.5 sq mi (125.7 km^{2})
  - Water: 0.46 sq mi (1.2 km^{2}) 0.96%
- Elevation: 1,358 ft (414 m)

Population (2020)
  - Total: 825
  - Density: 17/sq mi (6.6/km^{2})
- Time zone: UTC-5 (Eastern)
  - Summer (DST): UTC-4 (Eastern)
- ZIP codes: 03279 (Warren); 03238 (Glencliff)
- Area code: 603
- FIPS code: 33-78740
- GNIS feature ID: 873746
- Website: warren-nh.com

Warren is a town in Grafton County, New Hampshire, United States. The population was 825 at the 2020 census, down from 904 at the 2010 census. Warren includes the village of Glencliff. The Appalachian Trail crosses the town in the west.

It is the smallest by population of the six towns named Warren in New England (one in each state).

== History ==
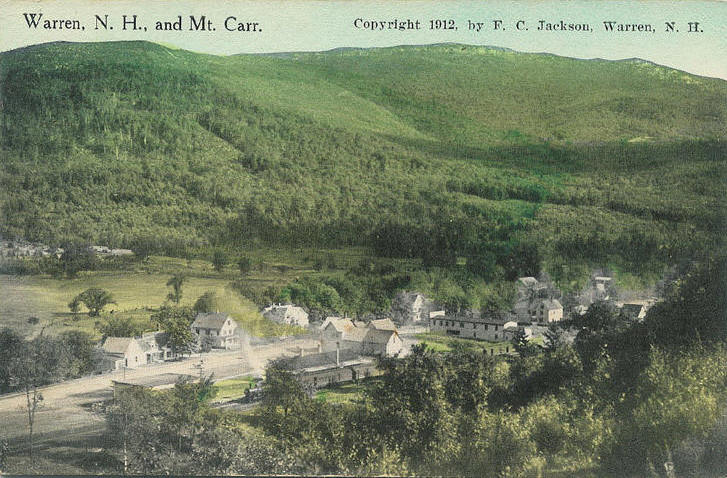
Bird's-eye view, 1912

Warren was granted in 1763 by Governor Benning Wentworth, and incorporated in 1770 by Governor John Wentworth. The town takes its name from Admiral Sir Peter Warren. It was first settled in 1767 by Joseph Patch.

From 1909 until 1970, Glencliff, located in the northern part of Warren, was the mailing address for the New Hampshire State Sanatorium, located just over the town line in Benton, at an elevation of 1,650 feet (500 m) on the slopes of Mount Moosilauke. Before the discovery of antibiotics, pure mountain air was thought to be curative for patients with tuberculosis. With its own farm on 500 acres (200 ha), the facility treated more than 4,000 individuals over its first half century, admitting between 50 and 100 per year. Many came from the industrial cities of southern New Hampshire such as Concord, Manchester and Nashua. It is now the Glencliff Home for the Elderly.

The town's most famous landmark is a Redstone ballistic missile erected in the center of the village green. It was donated by Henry T. Asselin, who transported the missile from the Redstone Arsenal near Huntsville, Alabama, in 1971, then placed it in honor of long-time Senator Norris Cotton, a Warren native.

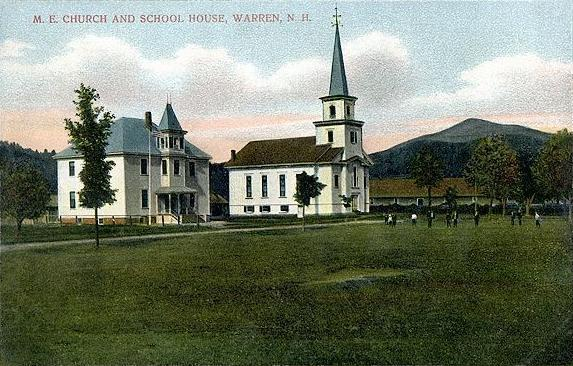
Church and school c. 1910

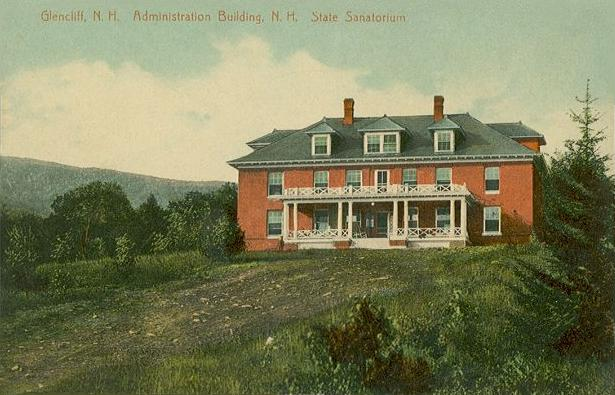
State Sanatorium in 1909

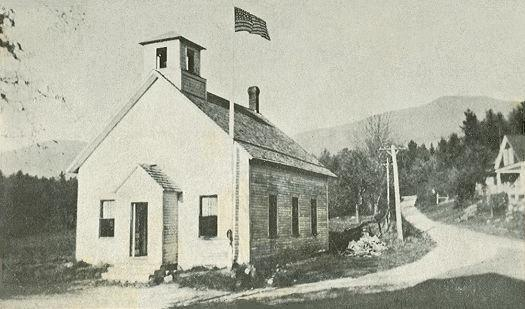
Summit School in 1915

== Geography ==
According to the United States Census Bureau, the town has a total area of 49.0 square miles (126.9 km^{2}), of which 48.5 square miles (125.7 km^{2}) are land and 0.5 square miles (1.2 km^{2}) are water, comprising 0.96% of the town. Warren is drained north to south by the Baker River, a tributary of the Pemigewasset River and part of the Merrimack River watershed. The far western part of the town has part of Lake Tarleton, which drains west to the Connecticut River. The highest point in Warren is at the southern boundary of the town, on the north ridge of Carr Mountain, where the elevation reaches approximately 3,330 feet (1,010 m) above sea level. Set in the White Mountains, the town is surrounded by the White Mountain National Forest.

Warren is crossed by New Hampshire Route 25 and New Hampshire Route 118.

== Demographics ==
Historical population
Census	Pop.	Note	%±
1790	206		—
1800	336		63.1%
1810	506		50.6%
1820	544		7.5%
1830	702		29.0%
1840	938		33.6%
1850	872		−7.0%
1860	1,152		32.1%
1870	960		−16.7%
1880	786		−18.1%
1890	875		11.3%
1900	799		−8.7%
1910	701		−12.3%
1920	600		−14.4%
1930	651		8.5%
1940	709		8.9%
1950	581		−18.1%
1960	548		−5.7%
1970	539		−1.6%
1980	650		20.6%
1990	820		26.2%
2000	873		6.5%
2010	904		3.6%
2020	825		−8.7%
U.S. Decennial Census

As of the census of 2010, there were 904 people, 381 households, and 238 families residing in the town. The population density in 2010 was 18.6 people per square mile (7.2/km^{2}). There were 612 housing units at an average density of 12.6 per square mile (4.8/km^{2}). The racial makeup of the town was 96.57% White, 0.22% African American, 0.33% Native American, 0.11% Asian, 0.22% some other race, and 2.43% from two or more races. Hispanic or Latino of any race were 0.55% of the population.

There were 381 households, out of which 27.8% had children under the age of 18 living with them, 52.2% were headed by married couples living together, 8.7% had a female householder with no husband present, and 37.5% were non-families. 28.1% of all households were made up of individuals, and 9.9% were someone living alone who was 65 years of age or older. The average household size was 2.37, and the average family size was 2.92.

In the town, the population was spread out, with 20.7% under the age of 18, 6.2% from 18 to 24, 22.8% from 25 to 44, 33.2% from 45 to 64, and 17.1% who were 65 years of age or older. The median age was 45.2 years. For every 100 females, there were 105.9 males. For every 100 females age 18 and over, there were 103.7 males.

The median annual income calculated between 2010 and 2014 by the Census' American Community Survey for a household in the town was $45,000, and the median income for a family was $52,857. Male full-time workers had a median income of $41,364 versus $36,250 for females. The per capita income for the town was $24,313. About 17.4% of families and 19.3% of the population were below the poverty line, including 32.1% of those under age 18 and 4.7% of those age 65 or over.

== Education ==
Warren is in the Warren School District.

== Notable people ==
- Moses Bixby (1827–1901), Baptist missionary to Burma
- Charles Bowles (1761–1843), Free Will Baptist minister
- Norris Cotton (1900–1989), US senator, congressman
- Robert "Bob" J. Giuda (born 1952), airline captain, state senator
- Joseph Monninger (born 1953), author

== Sites of interest ==
- New Hampshire Historical Marker No. 231: Norris Cotton Statesman 1900–1989
- New Hampshire Historical Marker No. 275: Sarah Whitcher and the Bear
- Warren Historical Society Museum
- Davis-White State Forest

== See also ==
- White Mountain art
