= Little River (New Hampshire Atlantic coast) =

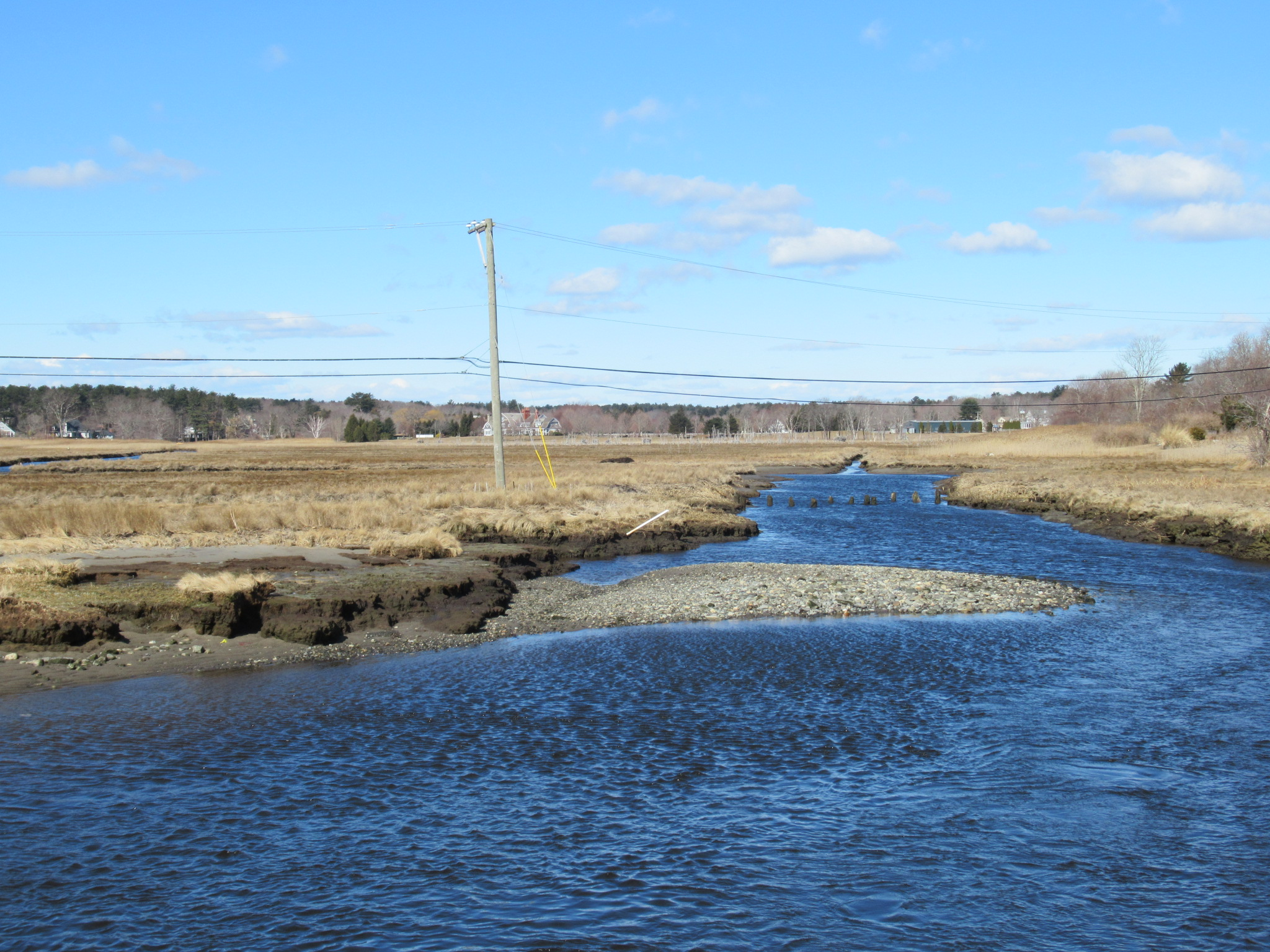
- The Little River salt marsh in North Hampton, NH

- Location within New Hampshire Location within the United States

Location
- Country: United States
- State: New Hampshire
- County: Rockingham
- Town: North Hampton

Physical characteristics
- Source
  - location: North Hampton
  - coordinates: 42°59′57″N 70°49′20″W
  - elevation: 70 ft (21 m)
- Mouth: Gulf of Maine (Atlantic Ocean)
  - location: North Hampton
  - coordinates: 42°57′24″N 70°46′43″W
  - elevation: 0 ft (0 m)
- Length: 4.6 mi (7.4 km)

Basin features
- Tributaries
  - left: North Brook, Oliver Brook
  - right: Garland Brook

The Little River is a 4.6-mile-long (7.4 km) river in southeastern New Hampshire in the United States. It is located entirely in the town of North Hampton, and it flows directly into the Atlantic Ocean, south of Little Boars Head.

The river rises in a forested wetland in the northern part of North Hampton and flows south, passing under U.S. 1. The river turns southeast, passes through Mill Pond and under NH 111, and enters the Little River salt marsh. The river enters the Atlantic Ocean by passing under NH 1A, using a new, large culvert installed by the New Hampshire Coastal Program in an effort to improve tidal flow into the salt marsh.

== See also ==
- List of rivers of New Hampshire
