= Benton, New Hampshire =

- Town
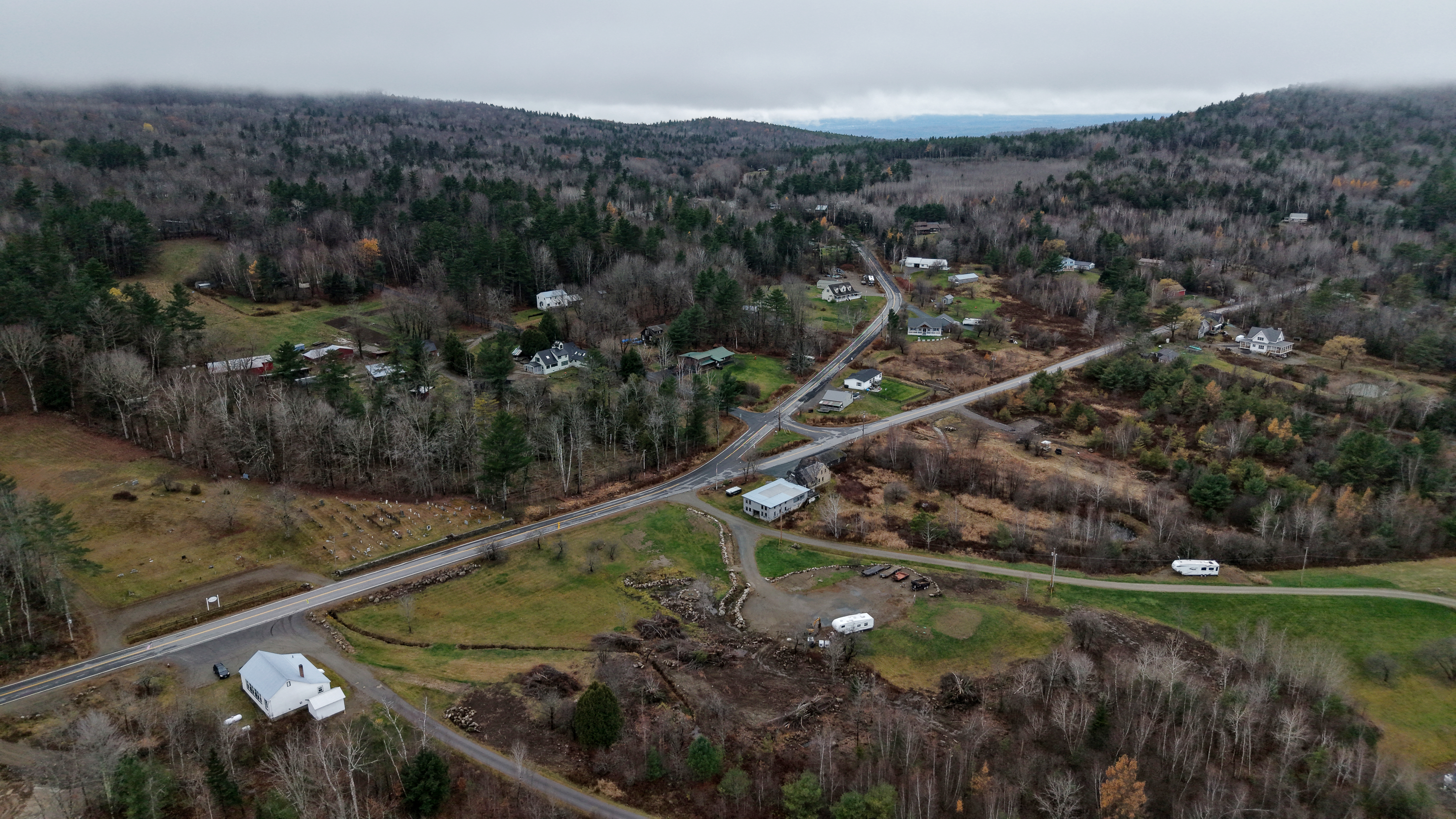
- Benton, NH, from the northeast

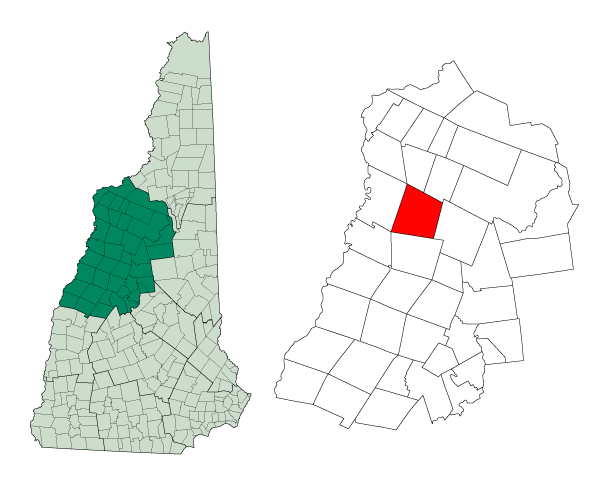
- Location in Grafton County, New Hampshire
- Coordinates: 44°02′28″N 71°52′37″W
- Country: United States
- State: New Hampshire
- County: Grafton
- Incorporated: 1764

Area
  - Total: 48.4 sq mi (125.4 km^{2})
  - Land: 48.2 sq mi (124.8 km^{2})
  - Water: 0.23 sq mi (0.6 km^{2}) 0.47%
- Elevation: 3,022 ft (921 m)

Population (2020)
  - Total: 374
  - Density: 7.8/sq mi (3/km^{2})
- Time zone: UTC-5 (Eastern)
  - Summer (DST): UTC-4 (Eastern)
- ZIP codes: 03785 (Woodsville); 03780 (Pike)
- Area code: 603
- FIPS code: 33-05060
- GNIS feature ID: 873544
- Website: www.tobentonnh.org

Benton is a town in Grafton County, New Hampshire, United States. The population was 374 at the 2020 census. Located in the White Mountains, Benton is largely surrounded by the White Mountain National Forest. The town is crossed by the Appalachian Trail.

== History ==
The town was granted by Governor Benning Wentworth on January 31, 1764, to Theophilus Fitch and others. It was named "Coventry" after Coventry, Connecticut, hometown to many of the settlers, who arrived shortly after the beginning of the Revolution. At the suggestion of Governor Isaac Hill, the name was changed on December 4, 1840, to Benton, in honor of Thomas Hart Benton, the Missouri senator who championed American westward expansion.

With a rough and mountainous terrain, the town was not suited for agriculture. But Benton had water power sites and abundant forests. By 1859, when the population was 478, there were five sawmills producing a large quantity of lumber. The Boston, Concord & Montreal Railroad ran through the town, which once included the village of Glencliff.

Atop Mount Moosilauke in 1860 was built the Prospect House, later renamed the Tip Top House, a stone hotel with accommodations for 35 hikers. A carriage road was built to the summit in 1870, so the hotel was enlarged in 1872 to accommodate 50 guests. In 1920, the hotel and land were given to Dartmouth College, but in 1942, the Tip Top House burned.

== Geography ==
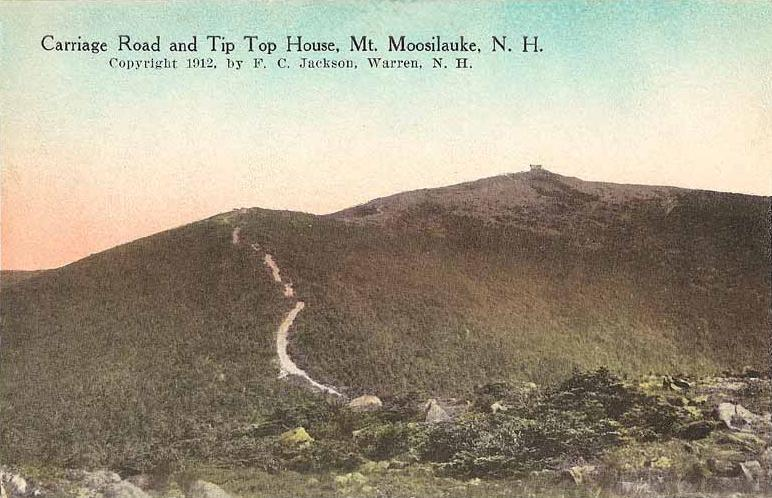
Mount Moosilauke in 1912

Benton is in northwestern New Hampshire, in the northern part of Grafton County. According to the U.S. Census Bureau, the town has a total area of 48.4 square miles (125.4 km^{2}), of which 48.2 square miles (124.8 km^{2}) are land and 0.23 square miles (0.6 km^{2}) are water, comprising 0.47% of the town. It is drained primarily by Oliverian Brook and the Wild Ammonoosuc River; the Baker River drains the southeastern corner. The Oliverian Brook and Wild Ammonoosuc portion of the town is within the Connecticut River watershed, while the small part in the southeastern corner is in the Merrimack River watershed. The highest point in town is the summit of Mount Moosilauke, at 4,802 feet (1,464 m) above sea level.

The northern corner of Benton is crossed by New Hampshire Route 116.

=== Climate ===
According to the Köppen Climate Classification system, Benton has a warm-summer humid continental climate, abbreviated "Dfb" on climate maps. The hottest temperature recorded in Benton was 95 °F (35.0 °C) on July 15, 1995, while the coldest temperature recorded was −29 °F (−33.9 °C) on January 27, 1994.

Climate data for Benton, New Hampshire, 1991–2020 normals, extremes 1965–2012
Month	Jan	Feb	Mar	Apr	May	Jun	Jul	Aug	Sep	Oct	Nov	Dec	Year
Record high °F (°C)	64 (18)	63 (17)	78 (26)	88 (31)	89 (32)	93 (34)	95 (35)	94 (34)	93 (34)	81 (27)	71 (22)	65 (18)	95 (35)
Mean maximum °F (°C)	48.6 (9.2)	50.2 (10.1)	60.7 (15.9)	76. (24)	81.9 (27.7)	86.8 (30.4)	87.6 (30.9)	86.0 (30.0)	81.7 (27.6)	73.5 (23.1)	63.8 (17.7)	52.8 (11.6)	89.3 (31.8)
Mean daily maximum °F (°C)	26.4 (−3.1)	29.2 (−1.6)	37.8 (3.2)	51.5 (10.8)	64.3 (17.9)	72.5 (22.5)	77.3 (25.2)	75.9 (24.4)	68.5 (20.3)	55.7 (13.2)	42.9 (6.1)	32.4 (0.2)	52.9 (11.6)
Daily mean °F (°C)	16.9 (−8.4)	19.0 (−7.2)	27.8 (−2.3)	40.8 (4.9)	53.0 (11.7)	61.5 (16.4)	66.5 (19.2)	64.8 (18.2)	57.2 (14.0)	45.3 (7.4)	34.4 (1.3)	23.7 (−4.6)	42.6 (5.9)
Mean daily minimum °F (°C)	7.4 (−13.7)	8.9 (−12.8)	17.8 (−7.9)	30.1 (−1.1)	41.8 (5.4)	50.5 (10.3)	55.7 (13.2)	53.6 (12.0)	45.8 (7.7)	34.9 (1.6)	25.9 (−3.4)	15.0 (−9.4)	32.3 (0.2)
Mean minimum °F (°C)	−15.6 (−26.4)	−10.9 (−23.8)	−3.7 (−19.8)	18.0 (−7.8)	28.0 (−2.2)	36.2 (2.3)	43.1 (6.2)	40.0 (4.4)	30.8 (−0.7)	22.2 (−5.4)	9.4 (−12.6)	−7.7 (−22.1)	−17.9 (−27.7)
Record low °F (°C)	−29 (−34)	−26 (−32)	−18 (−28)	3 (−16)	18 (−8)	27 (−3)	32 (0)	29 (−2)	22 (−6)	12 (−11)	−2 (−19)	−28 (−33)	−29 (−34)
Average precipitation inches (mm)	2.40 (61)	2.11 (54)	2.75 (70)	3.25 (83)	3.45 (88)	3.84 (98)	4.42 (112)	4.36 (111)	3.52 (89)	4.54 (115)	3.46 (88)	3.15 (80)	41.25 (1,049)
Average snowfall inches (cm)	17.4 (44)	14.4 (37)	14.2 (36)	2.9 (7.4)	0.1 (0.25)	0.0 (0.0)	0.0 (0.0)	0.0 (0.0)	0.0 (0.0)	1.2 (3.0)	3.6 (9.1)	17.6 (45)	71.4 (181.75)
Average extreme snow depth inches (cm)	11.0 (28)	12.0 (30)	11.5 (29)	3.4 (8.6)	0.0 (0.0)	0.0 (0.0)	0.0 (0.0)	0.0 (0.0)	0.0 (0.0)	0.4 (1.0)	2.1 (5.3)	9.0 (23)	16.6 (42)
Average precipitation days (≥ 0.01 in)	12.4	9.4	11.0	11.2	13.4	14.0	12.9	11.1	10.8	12.6	11.3	12.2	142.3
Average snowy days (≥ 0.1 in)	13.0	10.2	8.9	3.2	0.2	0.0	0.0	0.0	0.0	1.4	4.7	10.8	52.4
Source 1: NOAA
Source 2: XMACIS2 (mean maxima/minima, snow depth 1981–2010)

== Demographics ==
Historical population
Census	Pop.	Note	%±
1840	413		—
1850	478		15.7%
1860	459		−4.0%
1870	375		−18.3%
1880	378		0.8%
1890	244		−35.4%
1900	209		−14.3%
1910	219		4.8%
1920	177		−19.2%
1930	255		44.1%
1940	262		2.7%
1950	247		−5.7%
1960	172		−30.4%
1970	194		12.8%
1980	333		71.6%
1990	330		−0.9%
2000	314		−4.8%
2010	364		15.9%
2020	374		2.7%
U.S. Decennial Census

As of the census of 2000, there were 314 people, 91 households, and 59 families residing in the town. The population density was 6.5 inhabitants per square mile (2.5/km^{2}). There were 155 housing units at an average density of 3.2 per square mile (1.2/km^{2}). The racial makeup of the town was 97.45% White, 0.32% Asian, and 2.23% from two or more races.

There were 91 households, out of which 30.8% had children under the age of 18 living with them, 56.0% were married couples living together, 6.6% had a female householder with no husband present, and 34.1% were non-families. 28.6% of all households were made up of individuals, and 11.0% had someone living alone who was 65 years of age or older. The average household size was 2.43 and the average family size was 2.95.

In the town, the population was spread out, with 18.8% under the age of 18, 4.5% from 18 to 24, 22.3% from 25 to 44, 22.0% from 45 to 64, and 32.5% who were 65 years of age or older. The median age was 48 years. For every 100 females, there were 78.4 males. For every 100 females age 18 and over, there were 75.9 males.

The median income for a household in the town was $34,167, and the median income for a family was $40,417. Males had a median income of $28,125 versus $22,188 for females. The per capita income for the town was $13,220. About 3.8% of families and 8.8% of the population were below the poverty line, including none of those under age 18 and 13.0% of those age 65 or over.

== See also ==
- White Mountain art
