= Glencliff, New Hampshire =

Unincorporated community in New Hampshire, United States

- Unincorporated community
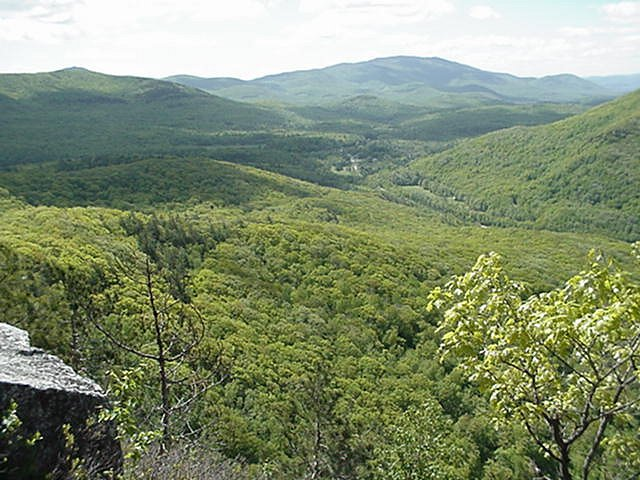
- The village of Glencliff in Oliverian Notch

- Location within New Hampshire Location within the United States
- Coordinates: 43°58′58″N 71°53′36″W
- Country: United States
- State: New Hampshire
- County: Grafton
- Town: Warren
- Elevation: 1,079 ft (329 m)
- Time zone: UTC-5 (Eastern (EST))
  - Summer (DST): UTC-4 (EDT)
- ZIP code: 03238
- Area code: 603
- GNIS feature ID: 871942

Glencliff is an unincorporated community within the White Mountain National Forest in the town of Warren in Grafton County, New Hampshire, United States. The village consists of fewer than one hundred residents and some forty man-made structures, including the Willing Workers Hall, the Glencliff Community Chapel, the old firefighter's garage, the Glencliff Improvement Cooperative (community water system), the post office (located in one of the dwellings) and the Glencliff Home for the Elderly (located higher up the mountain).

== History ==
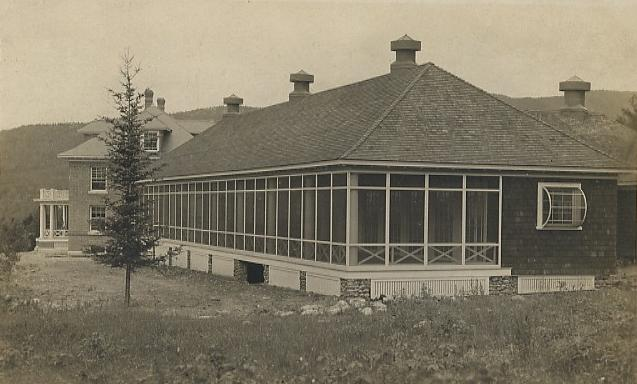
Glencliff Sanatorium in 1909

Located in the White Mountains, the village was originally part of the town of Coventry (now Benton), but the town of Warren successfully petitioned the state legislature to make the village part of Warren. The village was known as Warren Summit until an unfortunate incident in the early 1900s, when two trains crashed in a head-on collision, due to confusion over town names.

The Glencliff Home for the Elderly was formerly the Glencliff Sanatorium, which opened in the summer of 1909 for New Hampshire residents infected with tuberculosis (TB) and seeking respite and cure in the fresh mountain air. The sanatorium treated more than 4,000 TB patients during its first 50 years, admitting from 50 to 100 new patients each year.

== Geography ==
Glencliff is located in a high valley (1,000 feet above sea level) known as Oliverian Notch, the westernmost pass through the White Mountains. The Appalachian Trail passes directly through the village, with the Glencliff Post Office serving as a major resupply point for its hikers. More than 1,700 miles (2,700 km) to the south, the trail begins on Springer Mountain, Georgia, and more than 400 very rugged miles (644 kilometers) north, ends atop Mount Katahdin, Maine. While the origin of the name "Glencliff" is not known for certain, Glencliff is, in fact, located in a glen (or valley) and near a cliff—it is nestled below Mount Moosilauke to the east, Wyatt Hill and Webster Slide Mountain to the west, and the cliff of Owl's Head to the northwest, scoured by glaciers in the Pleistocene epoch and visible from the village.

== Village services ==
Glencliff boasts its own U.S. Post Office. The Glencliff Improvement Cooperative (GIC) operates and maintains the Glencliff municipal water supply including the well house and approximately 7-12 homes on the town line.

== Recreation ==
Recreational activities in the area include hiking, snowshoeing, walking, jogging, snowmobiling, and hunting. Local hiking trails in Glencliff include the Glencliff Trail, Tunnel Brook Trail, Wachipauka Pond Trail, Hurricane Mountain Trail and Blueberry Mountain Trail. The former railroad bed, which parallels New Hampshire Route 25 and intersects the Appalachian Trail, is an excellent rail trail currently used for walking, jogging, and snowmobiling. The trails and paths in the village are great for snowshoeing. The expansive forest in Glencliff is secluded and suited for viewing deer, bear, moose, turkey and other wildlife.
