= Mount Moosilauke =

Mountain in the American state of New Hampshire

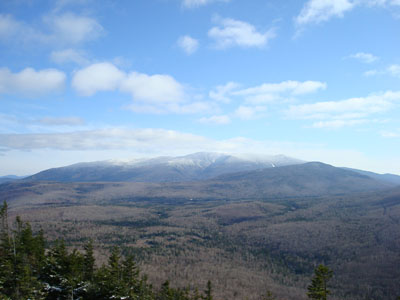
- Mt. Moosilauke as seen from Black Mountain

Highest point
- Elevation: 4,802 ft (1,464 m)
- Prominence: 2,932 ft (894 m)
- Listing: White Mountain 4000-Footers #9 New England 50 Finest
- Coordinates: 44°01′28″N 71°49′51″W

Geography
- Location: Grafton County, New Hampshire, U.S.
- Parent range: White Mountains
- Topo map: USGS Mount Moosilauke

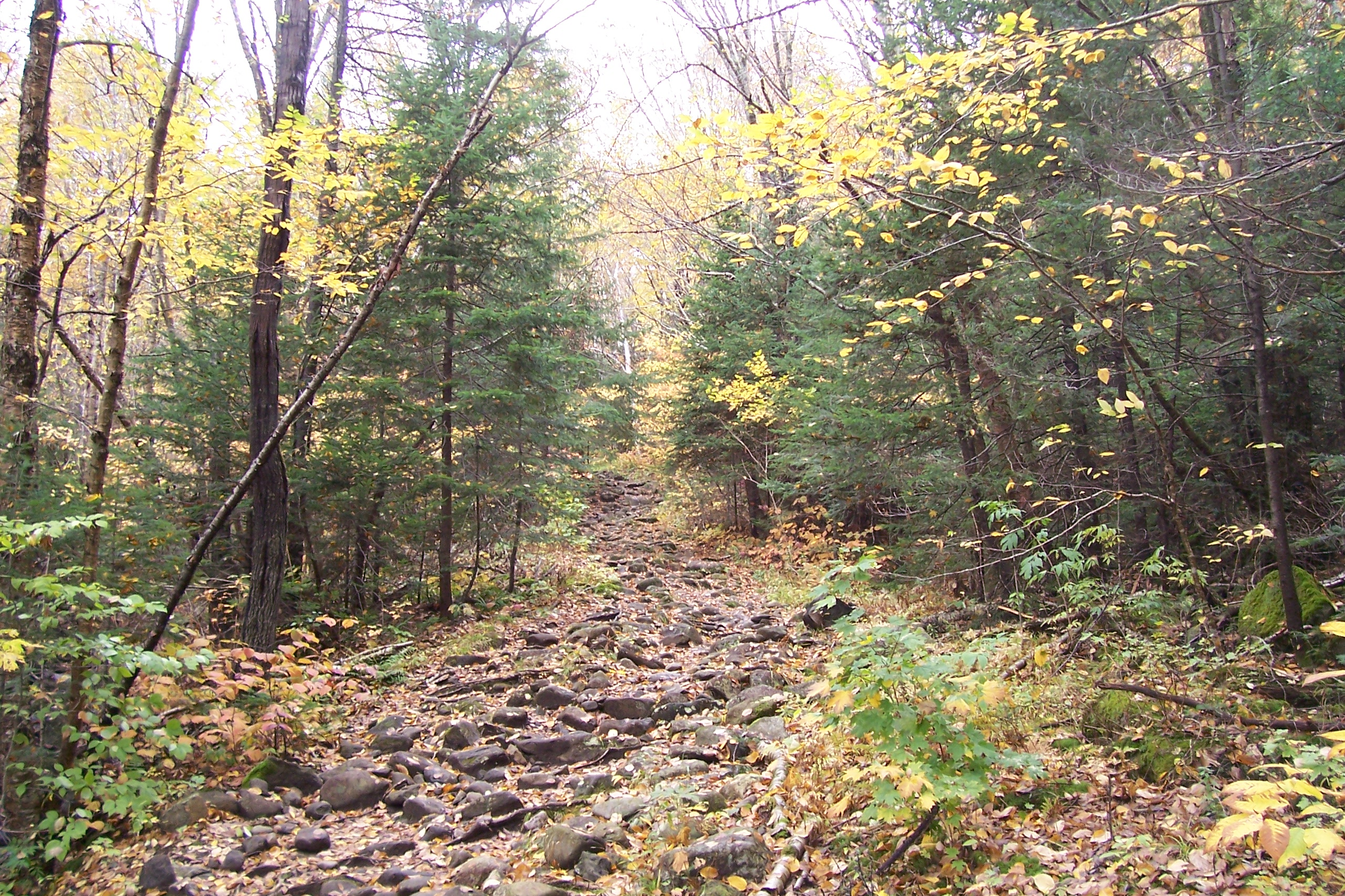
The Gorge Brook Trail ascends Mount Moosilauke from the Dartmouth College Ravine Lodge.

Mount Moosilauke is a 4,802-foot-high (1,464 m) mountain at the southwestern end of the White Mountains in the town of Benton, New Hampshire, United States. It is the tenth highest and most southwesterly of the 4,000 foot summits in the White Mountains.

Moosilauke is ranked 9th on the New England Fifty Finest peaks, a list of summits with the highest topographic prominence. The Appalachian Trail passes over the mountain. It is sometimes referred to as the "Gentle Giant". The site of down mountain ski races since 1927, the 1933 Moosilauke race was the first U.S. downhill skiing championship sanctioned by the National Ski Association.

== Etymology ==
The name Moosilauke (with its many variant spellings) is derived from the Abenaki language. The most common translation is "bald place". However, the derivation of place names from Algonquian languages is often quite uncertain, and other possible translations of Moosilauke include "at the place of ferns", "at the smooth place on the summit" and "good moose place along the brook".

== Geology ==
Mount Moosilauke is made up of metamorphic rock called the Littleton Formation which is Lower Devonian in age. The Littleton Formation is primarily a mica schist with zones containing garnet and staurolite-sillimanite. The unit also contains interbedded amphibolites. The mica schist started out as clay-rich mud in a marine basin that probably formed during the early Acadian Orogeny. The amphibolites may represent metamorphosed submarine basalt flows.

Pegmatite dikes cross-cut the Littleton Formation and can be seen from the Gorge Brook Trail as it nears treeline. These pegmatites are likely related to the geology to the east of the mountain which is dominated by the Kinsman quartz monzonite. This Acadian-aged igneous rock can be seen at the Kinsman Notch / Beaver Brook pond area.

== Topography ==
The summit of Moosilauke is treeless and offers panoramic views of the Kinsmans to the north, the Presidential Range and Franconia Ridge to the northeast, the heart of the White Mountains to the east, Lake Winnipesaukee and neighboring lakes to the southeast, and the Green Mountains and Adirondacks to the west, along with great views closer in to numerous glacially-carved ravines on Moosilauke's shoulders. The first winter high country weather observatory was set up at the top of Mt. Moosilauke in the winter of 1869-1870.

Moosilauke has numerous subsidiary peaks, including Mount Blue, elevation 4,529 feet (1,380 m), to the north of the summit, and the South Peak, elevation 4,523 feet (1,379 m), between the Carriage Road and Glencliff Trail, about one mile southwest of the main peak. The South Peak, reached by a 0.2-mile (0.32 km) spur trail, is particularly noted for its fine views of the main summit ridge, into the deep Tunnel Brook Ravine to neighboring Mt. Clough and westward into the Connecticut River valley and Vermont beyond.

== Climate ==
Climate data for Mount Moosilauke 44.0242 N, 71.8309 W, Elevation: 4,370 ft (1,332 m) (1991–2020 normals)
| Month | Jan | Feb | Mar | Apr | May | Jun | Jul | Aug | Sep | Oct | Nov | Dec | Year |
|---|---|---|---|---|---|---|---|---|---|---|---|---|---|
| Mean daily maximum °F (°C) | 18.3 (−7.6) | 20.0 (−6.7) | 26.8 (−2.9) | 41.6 (5.3) | 55.0 (12.8) | 63.4 (17.4) | 67.6 (19.8) | 66.1 (18.9) | 58.8 (14.9) | 46.6 (8.1) | 32.6 (0.3) | 23.7 (−4.6) | 43.4 (6.3) |
| Daily mean °F (°C) | 10.5 (−11.9) | 11.9 (−11.2) | 19.0 (−7.2) | 32.3 (0.2) | 45.5 (7.5) | 54.6 (12.6) | 59.2 (15.1) | 57.9 (14.4) | 50.9 (10.5) | 39.0 (3.9) | 26.4 (−3.1) | 16.8 (−8.4) | 35.3 (1.9) |
| Mean daily minimum °F (°C) | 2.7 (−16.3) | 3.8 (−15.7) | 11.2 (−11.6) | 22.9 (−5.1) | 36.0 (2.2) | 45.8 (7.7) | 50.9 (10.5) | 49.6 (9.8) | 43.0 (6.1) | 31.3 (−0.4) | 20.2 (−6.6) | 9.9 (−12.3) | 27.3 (−2.6) |
| Average precipitation inches (mm) | 4.56 (116) | 3.88 (99) | 4.78 (121) | 5.30 (135) | 5.62 (143) | 7.29 (185) | 7.29 (185) | 6.83 (173) | 5.42 (138) | 6.65 (169) | 5.60 (142) | 5.89 (150) | 69.11 (1,756) |
Source: PRISM Climate Group

== Climbing routes ==
The most commonly climbed route to the summit is the Gorge Brook Trail from Ravine Lodge. One can make a loop by returning via the Carriage Road and Snapper Trail. Other trails to the summit include the Glencliff Trail from the southwest, the Benton Trail from the north, the Beaver Brook Trail ascending very steeply past numerous waterfalls from Kinsman Notch to the northeast, the Carriage Road from the south and the Asquam Ridge Trail from the southeast. The Appalachian Trail, from south to north, utilizes the Glencliff, Carriage Road, Benton and Beaver Brook trails.

== Moosilauke Ravine Lodge ==
The Moosilauke Ravine Lodge, which offers food and accommodations to hikers, is situated in the valley on the southeast side of the mountain. The lodge is owned by Dartmouth College and is run by members of the Dartmouth Outing Club. Dartmouth College owns much of the southern and eastern portions of the mountain and has long had a close association with it, with the Outing Club maintaining its trails and the Appalachian Trail from Kinsman Notch southward to Hanover. Due to this long association, Moosilauke is often called "Dartmouth's Mountain".

== See also ==
- List of mountains of New Hampshire
- White Mountain National Forest
