= Mount Kelsey =

Mountain in New Hampshire, USA

Highest point
- Elevation: 3,472 ft (1,058 m)
- Prominence: 1,092 ft (333 m)
- Coordinates: 44°48′04″N 71°18′49″W

Geography
- Location: Coos County, NH
- Topo map: USGS Dixville Notch

Mount Kelsey is a mountain located in the western portion of Millsfield, New Hampshire. The western slopes of the mountain are contained within the township of Erving's Location, New Hampshire. The summit is occupied by part of the Granite Reliable Wind Farm, with road access from the Phillips Brook watershed to the south.

The north side of Mount Kelsey drains into the West Branch of Clear Stream, a tributary of the Androscoggin River, which flows south and east into Maine, joining the Kennebec River near the Atlantic Ocean. The southeast side of Kelsey drains into North Inlet Stream, thence into Millsfield Pond Brook, and into Clear Stream. The west side of Kelsey drains into Phillips Brook, thence into the Upper Ammonoosuc River, the upper Connecticut River, and into Long Island Sound in Connecticut.

== See also ==
- List of mountains in New Hampshire
