= Nash Stream Forest =

State Forest in Coos County, New Hampshire

Coordinates: 44°40′51″N 71°26′16″W

- IUCN category VI (protected area with sustainable use of natural resources)
- Location in New Hampshire
- Location: New Hampshire, United States
- Area: ~40,000 acres (160 km^{2})
- Governing body: State of New Hampshire

Nash Stream Forest is a nearly 40,000-acre (160 km^{2}) protected area in northern New Hampshire in the United States. The state-owned property is located south of Dixville Notch in the towns of Stark, Stratford, and Columbia, and in Odell township. The forest occupies land on either side of Nash Stream, a south-flowing tributary of the Upper Ammonoosuc River and part of the Connecticut River watershed. The forest is bordered to the south by Christine Lake and Kauffmann Forest.
