= Stark Union Church =

Historic church in New Hampshire, United States

- U.S. National Register of Historic Places
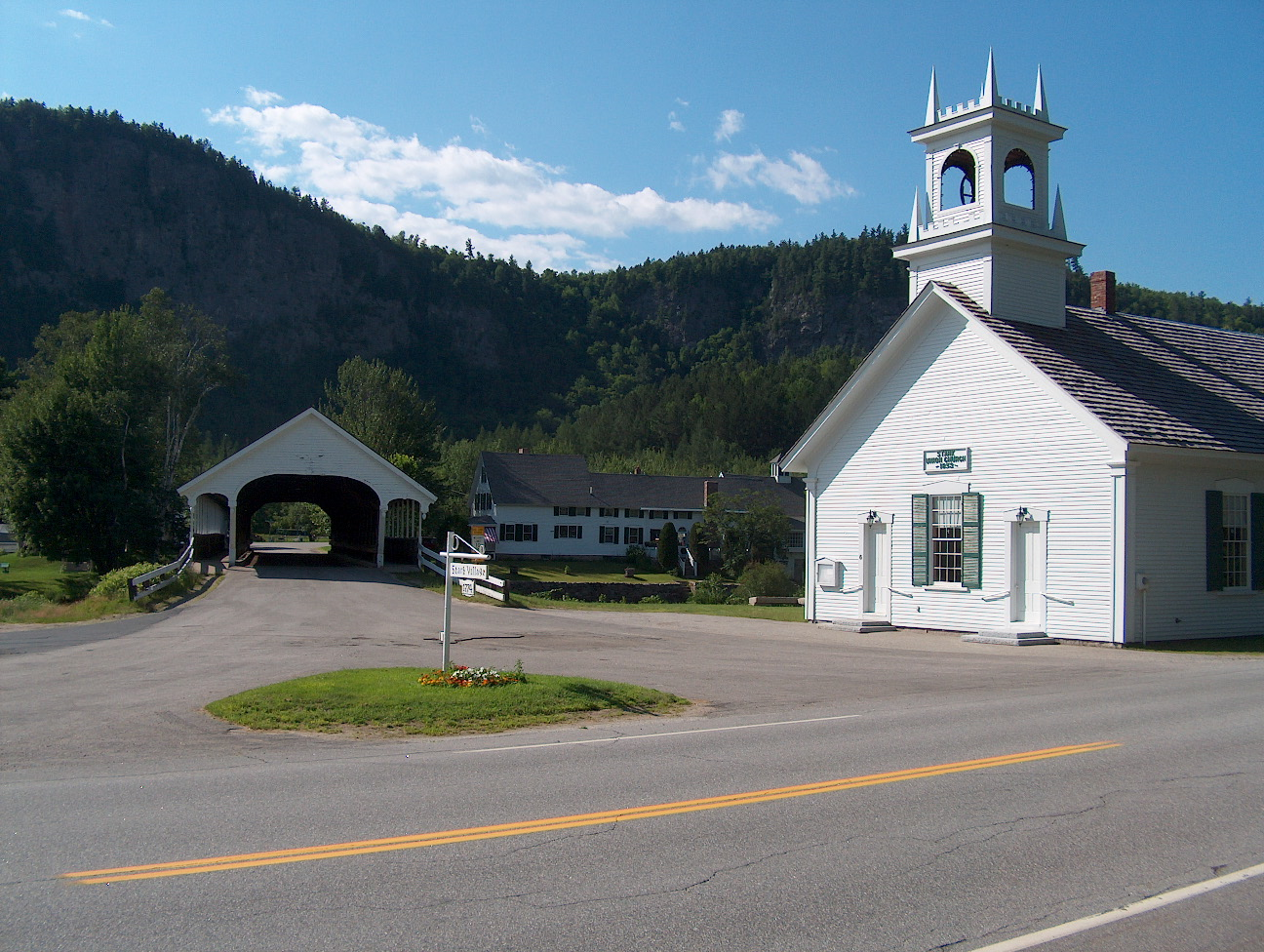

- Location within New Hampshire Location within the United States
- Location: NH 110, Stark, New Hampshire
- Coordinates: 44°36′3.3″N 71°24′37″W
- Area: 1 acre (0.40 ha)
- Built: 1853
- Architectural style: Greek Revival, Gothic Revival
- NRHP reference No.: 83004089
- Added to NRHP: December 08, 1983

The Stark Union Church (also known as the Stark Church) is a historic church on NH 110 in Stark, New Hampshire. Built in 1853 to serve as non-denominational worship space, it is a well-preserved example of mid-19th century vernacular church architecture. The building was listed on the National Register of Historic Places in 1983. It is still the only church in the rural community.

== Description and history ==
The Stark Union Church is one of the prominent and visible features of the small village of Stark, set on the west side of New Hampshire Route 110 at its junction with Northside Road, which crosses the Upper Ammonoosuc River on the Stark Covered Bridge just to the west. The church is a modest single-story wood-frame structure, with a gabled roof and clapboarded exterior. It is oriented facing south toward Northside Street, with its long side paralleling NH 110. The front facade is symmetrical, with a pair of entrances flanking a single sash window. The doors and window are each topped by a slightly peaked lintel. Windows on the sides are also sash, with similar decoration. A two-stage tower rises from the roof ridge, its second stage an open belfry with round-arch openings. Each stage has pinnacles at the corners, and the top is crested by low crenellations. The interior is relatively plain, with plaster walls and bench pews.

The church was built in 1853, at a time when the small community's numerous congregations could not individually afford to build churches. The building continues to be owned by the Pew Owner's Association whose subscription fees funded its construction. It is a well-preserved example of a vernacular Greek Revival New England church.

== See also ==
- National Register of Historic Places listings in Coos County, New Hampshire
