= Erving's Grant, New Hampshire =

Township in Coos County, New Hampshire, United States

- Township
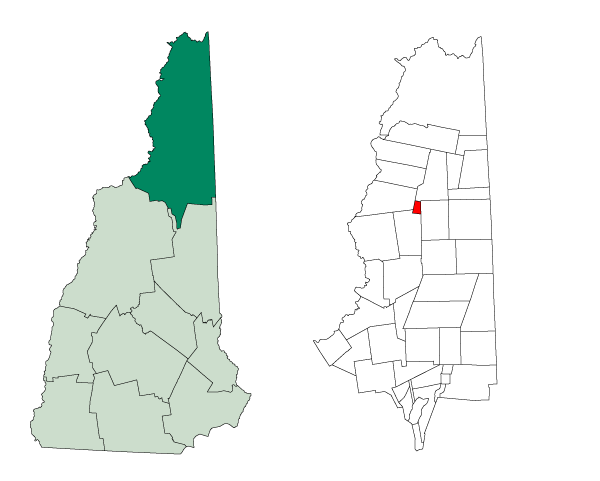
- Location in Coös County, New Hampshire
- Coordinates: 44°48′6″N 71°20′38″W
- Country: United States
- State: New Hampshire
- County: Coös

Area
  - Total: 3.75 sq mi (9.72 km^{2})
  - Land: 3.75 sq mi (9.72 km^{2})
  - Water: 0 sq mi (0 km^{2}) 0%
- Elevation: 2,200 ft (670 m)

Population (2020)
  - Total: 0
- Time zone: UTC-5 (EST)
  - Summer (DST): UTC-4 (EDT)
- Area code: 603
- FIPS code: 33-007-25180
- GNIS feature ID: 873594

Erving's Grant (formerly Erving's Location) is a township in Coös County, New Hampshire, United States. As of the 2020 census, the population of the township was zero and also estimated to be zero in 2025. In New Hampshire, locations, grants, townships (which are different from towns), and purchases are unincorporated portions of a county which are not part of any town and have limited self-government (if any, as many are uninhabited).

There is a dirt road that starts at New Hampshire State Route 26 in Millsfield just north of a pond and ends to the west in Erving's Grant's northeast corner. It is the only way to get to Erving's Grant without hiking.

== History ==
In 1775, a land grant was made to Captain William Erving of Boston, who had fought in the French and Indian Wars.

== Geography ==
According to the United States Census Bureau, the location has a total area of 3.7 square miles (9.7 km^{2}), all land. It is drained by Phillips Brook, which rises in the township and flows south to the Upper Ammonoosuc River in Stark, part of the Connecticut River watershed. The northeast corner of the township is drained by the West Branch of Clear Stream, flowing east to the Androscoggin River in Errol. The township's highest point is 2,840 feet (870 m) above sea level, along its eastern boundary, partway up the slope of Mount Kelsey, the summit of which is located in Millsfield.

=== Adjacent municipalities ===
- Dixville (north)
- Millsfield (east)
- Odell (south)
- Columbia (west)

== Demographics ==
Historical population
Census	Pop.	Note	%±
1920	31		—
1960	0		—
1970	0		—
1980	0		—
1990	0		—
2000	1		—
2010	0		−100.0%
2020	0		—
U.S. Decennial Census

In the 2020 census, no people were recorded as living in Erving's Location.
