= Christine Lake =

Christine Lake may refer to:

- Christine Lake (Minnesota), a lake in Cook County
- Christine Lake (New Hampshire), a lake in Coos County
