= Paris, New Hampshire =

Unincorporated community in New Hampshire, United States

- Location within New Hampshire Location within the United States
- Coordinates: 44°39′4″N 71°19′15″W
- Country: United States
- State: New Hampshire
- County: Coos
- Towns: Dummer, Stark

Paris is an unincorporated community located within the towns of Dummer and Stark, New Hampshire, United States. The community is located along New Hampshire Route 110 and north of the Upper Ammonoosuc River, in an area north of West Milan. The majority of the Paris community is located in the western part of the town of Dummer, but it also includes a small portion of Stark around the area of Pike Pond.
