= Kauffmann Forest =

Protected area in New Hampshire, United States

Coordinates: 44°37′12″N 71°24′49″W

Kauffmann Forest is a protected area around Christine Lake in Coos County, New Hampshire. It is owned by the Percy Summer Club and is protected by a conservation easement held by the Society for the Protection of New Hampshire Forests.

== Description ==
Along with the state-owned Nash Stream Forest, the protected land includes the entire watershed of Christine Lake and offers scenic canoeing and kayaking as well as fishing for trout and bird watching for loon, osprey, and bald eagle. Also contiguous with Devils Slide State Forest, the combined protected area covers more than 2,000 acres (810 ha).

The Kauffmann Forest is open to the public, and boats powered by engines up to 10 HP are permitted. Private "lodges" owned by club members are located along the lake's west end and date to the late 19th and early 20th centuries. It is a working forest area and is logged, apart from sensitive riparian areas. A trail leads up the Devil's Slide and offers views of the village of Stark and the White Mountain National Forest. The geology of the area includes a ring dike fostering a special habitat.
