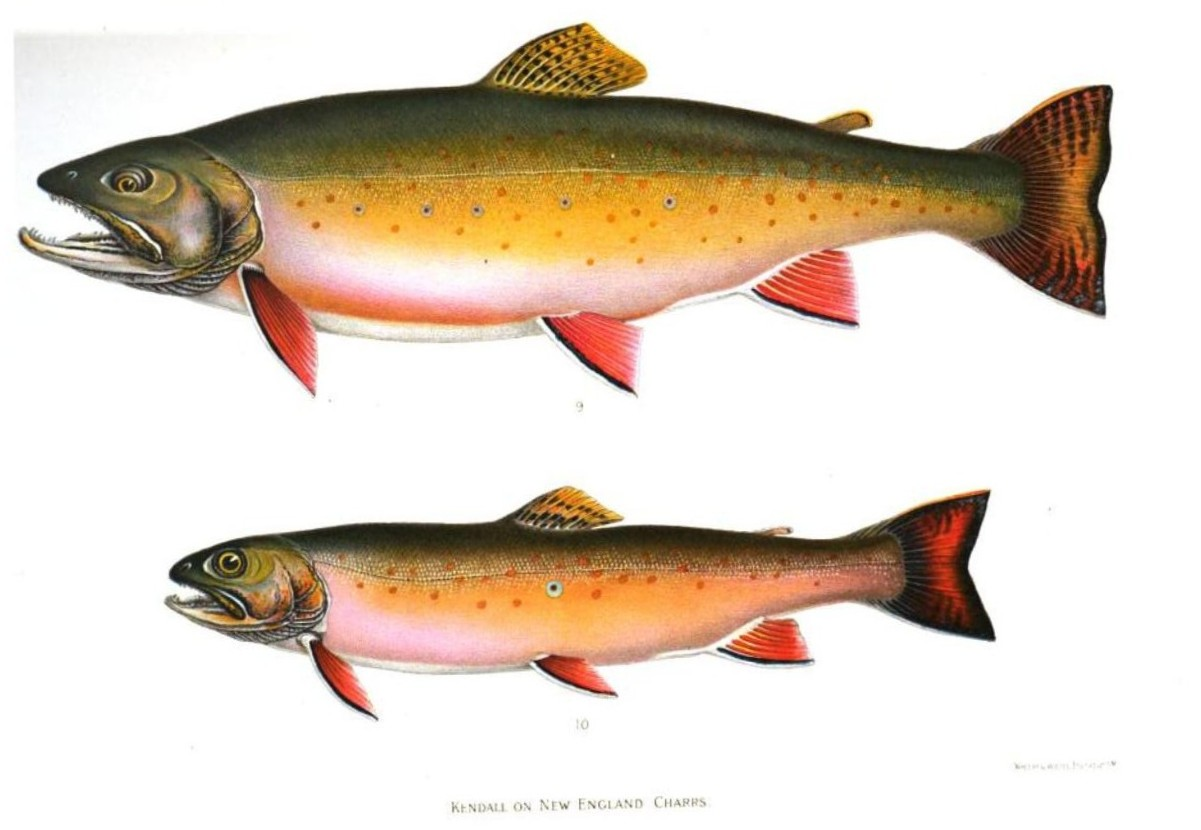
- Male (top) and female (bottom)

Conservation status
- Extinct (1930) (IUCN 2.3)

- Presumed Extinct (1930) (NatureServe)

Scientific classification
- Kingdom: Animalia
- Phylum: Chordata
- Class: Actinopterygii
- Order: Salmoniformes
- Family: Salmonidae
- Genus: Salvelinus
- Subgenus: Baione
- Species: †S. agassizii

Binomial name
- †Salvelinus agassizii (Garman, 1885)

Synonyms
- Salvelinus fontinalis agassizii

= Silver trout =

Extinct species of fish

The silver trout (Salvelinus agassizii) is an extinct char species or subspecies that inhabited a few waters in New Hampshire in the United States prior to 1939, when a biological survey conducted on the Connecticut watershed by the New Hampshire Fish and Game Department found none.

== Description ==
The silver trout was about a foot long. It had an olive-green back that faded to a bright silver underside tinged with vermillion. Females had faint golden spots along their side. Males were darker-colored with more red on the belly, and had small red spots within their golden spots. Size-based sexual dimorphism was also far more pronounced among the silver trout than among other char, with males being much larger than females, as opposed to only a slight size difference in other char species.

== Taxonomy ==
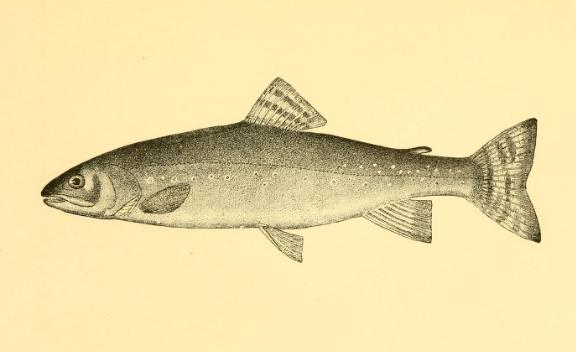
1902 illustration by Frank Mackie Johnson

The distinctiveness of the silver trout was noted by famed naturalist Louis Agassiz as far back as 1859, who requested specimens of trout from Dublin Pond, and upon analyzing them, identified them as a taxon distinct from the brook trout.

To formally describe the species and prevent local fishermen from overharvesting in the absence of bag limits, specimens were sent to Harvard and the U.S. National Museum for identification, where the fish was first described as a form of lake trout (Salvelinus namaycush), and later as a variety of brook trout (Salvelinus fontinalis) by Spencer Fullerton Baird. The silver trout was described as Salmo agassizii by Samuel Garman in 1885, honoring Agassiz for his early identification of the fish. However, David Starr Jordan disputed this classification and reiterated that the silver trout was only a subspecies or color morph of the brook trout, referring to it as Salvelinus fontinalis agassizi. Jordan would later accept it as a distinct species in his book American Food and Game Fishes. W. C. Kendall, who published a famous monograph on New England chars in 1914, in turn concluded that the silver trout was related to the Arctic char (Salvelinus alpinus).

Re-examining the 13 silver trout specimens in the U.S. National Museum by matching the markings on the dorsal fin and tail, the numbers of vertebrae, and the array of pelvic fin rays and between different species, Robert J. Behnke concluded that the silver trout was most closely related to the brook trout, while the divergence was still concluded to be enough to place it outside of typical S. fontinalis. Behnke concluded the silver trout evolved from brook trout ancestors in New England lakes with deep, cold, clear, well-oxygenated depths as a planktivorous fish.

== Distribution ==
The silver trout was an exceedingly rare fish, having become trapped by changed drainage systems in two New Hampshire lakes (Dublin/Monadnock Pond and Christine Lake in Stark) that were left as successors of Lake Hitchcock, a very large glacial lake that persisted for 4,000 years where the silver trout probably evolved from brook trout. In the deep waters of these lakes, cut off from other species, the silver trout had no natural predators.

In Kendall's 1914 monograph, an 1884 letter from a local fish warden is reproduced. The warden states that both silver and brook trout were captured from Dublin Pond for a project to stock nearby Stone Pond. It is unknown whether this effort was successful.

== Ecology ==
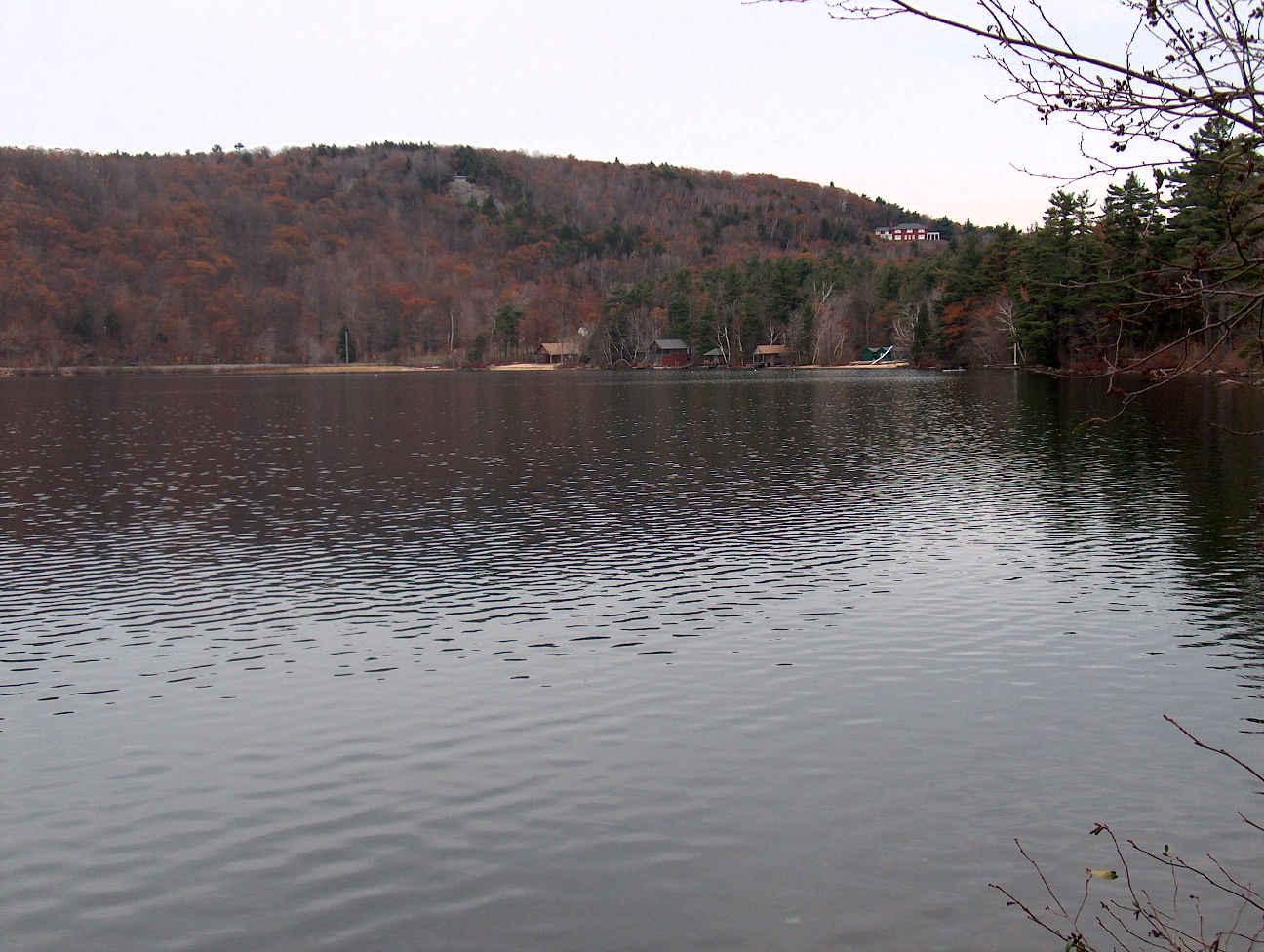
Dublin Pond in New Hampshire, the type locality of this species

The silver trout inhabited the deeper reaches in the center of Dublin/Monadnock Pond for most of the year, migrating to the shallows to spawn during the fall. These migrations were apparently timed precisely to the first day of October, with it being alleged that a fisherman could harvest several dozen pounds on October 1 when they had caught none the previous day. They congregated around cavities in submerged rocks along the shoreline during spawning.

The silver trout was apparently one of only two native gamefish species that originally inhabited Dublin Pond prior to the introduction of other fish species. The other was a "perch" of uncertain affinities that inhabited an entirely different reach of the pond. The silver trout and the perch were never seen or caught together.

== Extinction ==
The silver trout had already been significantly diminished in Dublin Pond by 1874, with claims of much larger populations in the past. Fishermen managed to get around bag limits for the species by declaring it a "lake trout" in the winter and a "brook trout" in the summer (coinciding with the respective hunting seasons for both fish). This loophole was resolved after taxonomic analysis was performed by Spencer Fullerton Baird, who declared them a form of a brook trout, forcing fishermen to abide by the brook trout's bag limit.

By the late 19th century, as each lake developed its own steady summer tourism, recreational fishermen who sought to increase their catches began to introduce new fish species, and these eventually overwhelmed the native silver trout. Yellow perch, which eat trout eggs, and lake trout, which hold the same ecological niche, as well as eat and hybridize with other char species, were particularly devastating. Other species were also introduced that have proved to be devastating to native trout species in other waters, the rainbow trout, brown trout, Atlantic salmon, and rainbow smelt.

The last six confirmed specimens of silver trout were collected in 1930, and it was declared extinct the same year. However, potential later records exist of a number of alleged silver trout specimens caught throughout the 1930s, which were documented by John E. Coffin in the January 1939 issue of Outdoor Life. One was also caught by Coffin himself, who documented his efforts in the article. However, without an analysis of the gill rakers, the true identity of these trout remains uncertain.

While the silver trout is most likely extinct, success stories like the Pyramid Lake Lahontan cutthroat trout and the Sunapee golden trout exist, and it may still persist.
