= Nash Stream =

- Location within New Hampshire Location within the United States

Location
- Country: United States
- State: New Hampshire
- County: Coos
- Towns and townships: Columbia, Odell, Stratford, Stark

Physical characteristics
- Source: Whitcomb Mountain
  - location: Odell
  - coordinates: 44°47′23″N 71°22′53″W
  - elevation: 3,140 ft (960 m)
- Mouth: Upper Ammonoosuc River
  - location: Stark
  - coordinates: 44°37′32″N 71°27′57″W
  - elevation: 942 ft (287 m)
- Length: 15.3 mi (24.6 km)

Basin features
- Tributaries
  - left: Pike Brook, East Branch, Pond Brook, Long Mountain Brook, Slide Brook
  - right: Columbia Brook, Johnson Brook, Silver Brook

Nash Stream is a 15.3-mile-long (24.6 km) river in northern New Hampshire in the United States. It is a tributary of the Upper Ammonoosuc River and part of the Connecticut River watershed.

Nash Stream rises on the western slopes of Whitcomb Mountain in the township of Odell, New Hampshire, and flows west briefly into the town of Columbia before turning south-southwest to flow through Odell and the town of Stratford, joining the Upper Ammonoosuc River in the town of Stark. Near its headwaters, it passes through Nash Bog Pond, an extensive marshy area which used to be a large pond closed by a dam. The dam washed out in the 1960s. Nearly the entire stream is within the boundaries of the Nash Stream Forest, owned by the state of New Hampshire.

The Nash Stream watershed is surrounded by mountains. The most commonly hiked are North and South Percy Peaks, barren summits offering extensive views reached by a trail, and Sugarloaf, reached by a trail which formerly gave access to a fire tower.

== Nash Stream Forest Management Plan ==
- 2017 Nash Stream Forest Management Plan Revision
- 2002 Nash Stream Forest Management Plan Updates and Revisions
- 1995 Nash Stream Forest Management Plan

== See also ==
- List of New Hampshire rivers
