= Devils Slide State Forest =

State forest in Coos County, New Hampshire

Coordinates: 44°36′43″N 71°25′9″W

- Location: Coös County, New Hampshire
- Nearest city: Stark, New Hampshire
- Area: 290 acres (120 ha)
- Established: 1988
- Governing body: New Hampshire Department of Natural and Cultural Resources

Devils Slide State Forest is a 290-acre (120 ha) state forest in Stark, New Hampshire. It is part of a contiguous area of more than 2,000 acres (810 ha) of protected lands that includes the Kauffmann Forest and Percy State Forest.

== See also ==
- List of New Hampshire state forests
