= Millsfield, New Hampshire =

Township in Coos County, New Hampshire, United States

- Township
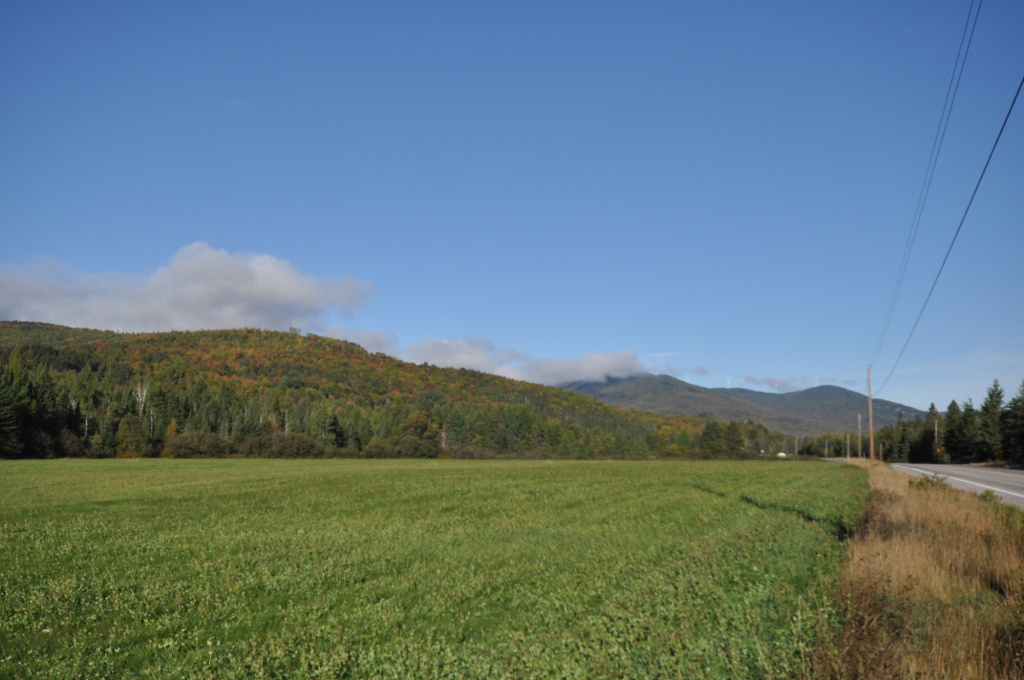
- Hills in Dixville from New Hampshire Route 26 in Millsfield

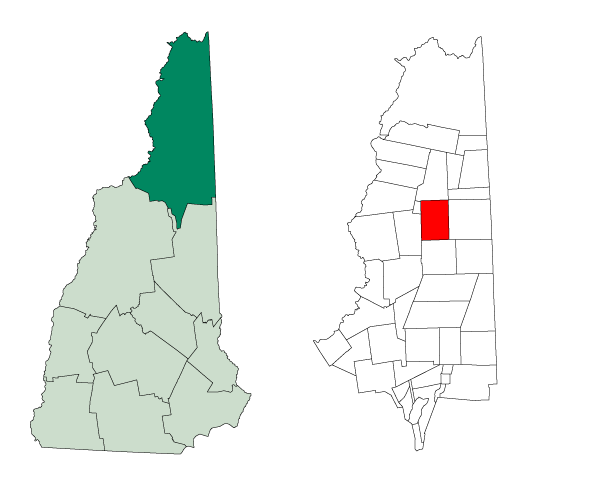
- Location in Coös County, New Hampshire
- Coordinates: 44°45′54″N 71°16′14″W
- Country: United States
- State: New Hampshire
- County: Coös

Area
  - Total: 45.2 sq mi (117.1 km^{2})
  - Land: 44.8 sq mi (116.1 km^{2})
  - Water: 0.39 sq mi (1.0 km^{2}) 0.89%
- Elevation: 2,030 ft (620 m)

Population (2020)
  - Total: 25
  - Density: 0.57/sq mi (0.22/km^{2})
- Time zone: UTC-5 (Eastern)
  - Summer (DST): UTC-4 (Eastern)
- Area code: 603
- FIPS code: 33-007-48260
- GNIS feature ID: 873667

Millsfield is a township in Coös County, New Hampshire, United States. It is part of the Berlin, NH-VT Micropolitan Statistical Area. The population was 25 at the 2020 census.

In New Hampshire, locations, grants, townships, which are different from towns, and purchases are unincorporated portions of a county, which are not part of any town and have limited self-government, if any, as many are uninhabited.

== History ==
In 1774, Millsfield was granted to George Boyd and others and contained about 23,200 acres (94 km^{2}). It was named in honor of Sir Thomas Mills. In 1952, Millsfield was organized for voting purposes.

== Geography ==
The township has a total area of 45.2 square miles (117.1 km^{2}), of which 44.8 square miles (116.1 km^{2}) are land and 0.4 square miles (1.0 km^{2}), or 0.89%, are water. Millsfield Pond is in the center of the township. The outlet, Millsfield Pond Brook, flows northeastward to Clear Stream at the eastern boundary of the township. Clear Stream, which crosses the northeastern corner of the township, is an eastward-flowing tributary of the Androscoggin River.

The southeastern part of the township drains to the Androscoggin River, via Newell Brook and the outlet of Moose Pond. The southwestern part of the township is drained by Phillips Brook, a southward-flowing tributary of the Upper Ammonoosuc River and part of the Connecticut River watershed.

New Hampshire Route 26 crosses the northeastern part of Millsfield, following Clear Stream. To the northwest, it leads over Dixville Notch to Colebrook, while to the southeast it leads into Errol and then continues to the Maine border. Millsfield has the only road that leads to Erving's Location, an uninhabited township. The road goes to the north of Mount Kelsey, the highest point in Millsfield at 3,472 feet (1,058 m) above sea level.

=== Adjacent municipalities ===
- Dixville (north)
- Wentworth Location (northeast)
- Errol (east)
- Dummer (south)
- Odell (west)
- Erving's Location (northwest)

== Politics ==
New Hampshire law allows towns with fewer than 100 residents to open the polls at midnight and close them as soon as all registered voters have cast their ballots. Beginning in 2016, Millsfield became the third town in New Hampshire with midnight voting.

=== Election results ===
Boldfaced names indicate the ultimate nationwide winner of each contest:

==== 2016 ====
Dem. primary: (3 votes)	Rep. primary: (17 votes)	General election: (21 votes)
**Hillary Clinton - 2**	Ted Cruz - 9	**Donald Trump - 16**
Bernie Sanders - 1	**Donald Trump - 3**	Hillary Clinton - 4
	John Kasich - 1	Bernie Sanders - 1
	Jeb Bush - 1	
	Carly Fiorina - 1	
	Chris Christie - 1	
	Rand Paul - 1	

In July 2016 residents voted to seek incorporation as a town. Legislative action will be required to implement this process.

==== 2020 ====
Dem. primary: (5 votes)	Rep. primary: (17 votes)	General election: (21 votes)
Amy Klobuchar - 2	**Donald Trump - 16**	Donald Trump - 16
**Joe Biden - 1**	Bill Weld - 1	**Joe Biden - 5**
Pete Buttigieg - 1		
Bernie Sanders - 1		

== Demographics ==
Historical population
Census	Pop.	Note	%±
1830	33		—
1840	12		−63.6%
1860	15		—
1870	28		86.7%
1880	62		121.4%
1890	62		0.0%
1900	41		−33.9%
1910	12		−70.7%
1920	45		275.0%
1930	33		−26.7%
1940	34		3.0%
1950	16		−52.9%
1960	7		−56.2%
1970	18		157.1%
1980	7		−61.1%
1990	21		200.0%
2000	22		4.8%
2010	23		4.5%
2020	25		8.7%
U.S. Decennial Census

In the 2000 census, there were 22 people, 8 households, and 5 families residing in the township. The population density was 0.5 inhabitants per square mile (0.19/km^{2}). There were 62 housing units at an average density of 1.4 per square mile (0.54/km^{2}). The racial makeup of the township was 100.00% White.

There were 8 households, out of which 12.5% (one) had children under the age of 18 living with them, 37.5% (three) were married couples living together, 25.0% (two) had a female householder with no husband present, and 37.5% (three) were non-families. 37.5% (three) of all households were made up of individuals, and 25.0% had someone living alone who was 65 years of age or older. The average household size was 2.75 and the average family size was 3.80.

In the township the population was spread out, with 13.6% (three) under the age of 18, 9.1% (two) from 18 to 24, 22.7% (five) from 25 to 44, 9.1% (two) from 45 to 64, and 45.5% (10) who were 65 years of age or older. The median age was 52 years. For every 100 females, there were 37.5 males. For every 100 females age 18 and over, there were 46.2 males.

The median household income was $59,375, and the median family income was $59,375. Males had a median income of $38,750 versus $0 for females. The per capita income for the township was $13,063. None of the population or the families were below the poverty line.

== See also ==
- Dixville Notch, New Hampshire
- Hart's Location, New Hampshire
