= North Branch Upper Ammonoosuc River =

- Location within New Hampshire Location within the United States

Location
- Country: United States
- State: New Hampshire
- County: Coos
- Towns: Milan, Berlin

Physical characteristics
- Source
  - location: Milan
  - coordinates: 44°31′58″N 71°11′52″W
  - elevation: 1,470 ft (450 m)
- Mouth: Upper Ammonoosuc River
  - location: West Milan
  - coordinates: 44°35′40″N 71°18′4″W
  - elevation: 978 ft (298 m)
- Length: 11.0 mi (17.7 km)

Basin features
- Tributaries
  - right: Cedar Brook

The North Branch of the Upper Ammonoosuc River is an 11.0-mile-long (17.7 km) river in northern New Hampshire in the United States. It is a tributary of the Upper Ammonoosuc River and part of the Connecticut River watershed.

Nearly the entire length of the North Branch is in the town of Milan, New Hampshire. The river briefly enters the city of Berlin, where it passes through Head Pond, then heads north back into Milan, running parallel to the Upper Ammonoosuc until the two rivers join in the village of West Milan. The Androscoggin River, just three miles to the east, flows parallel to the two Upper Ammonoosuc branches, but in the opposite direction. The St. Lawrence and Atlantic Railroad follows the North Branch from Head Pond to West Milan.

== See also ==
- List of New Hampshire rivers
