= Aurora trout =

Scientific classification
- Domain: Eukaryota
- Kingdom: Animalia
- Phylum: Chordata
- Class: Actinopterygii
- Order: Salmoniformes
- Family: Salmonidae
- Genus: Salvelinus
- Species: S. fontinalis
- Subspecies: S. f. timagamiensis

Trinomial name
- Salvelinus fontinalis timagamiensis Henn & Rinckenbach, 1925

Subspecies of fish

The aurora trout, Salvelinus fontinalis timagamiensis, is a variant or subspecies of the brook trout native to two lakes in the Temagami District of Ontario, Canada. The existence of the fish was brought to the attention of the angling world by four American anglers who were taken by Archie King of Latchford, Ontario, into Ontario's Lady Evelyn River system in 1923. Recognizing the fish as different or unique, the anglers took a specimen back to the Carnegie Museum in Pittsburgh, in the United States, where Dr. Arthur W. Henn was asked to identify the fish. He wrote about the fish in 1925 wherein he and Rinckenbach identified it as a distinct species, Salvelinus timagamiensis, but since a seminal re-examination of the material by Sale in 1967, taxonomists now agree the fish is, in a fact, at most a subspecies of the brook trout, named Salvelinus fontinalis timagamiensis. Genetic data has not yet supported its taxonomic distinction.

The aurora trout is distinguished from the brook trout by its unique coloration. Aurora trout are generally without spots, the colouration grading from a magenta hue on the back to a bright, nearly fluorescent orange along the belly, especially in mature males. The life history of the fish is essentially identical to that of the brook trout. Adults average about 0.5 to 1.5 kg, although individuals up to 4 kg are known.

The aurora trout occupied a very restricted range, probably occurring in only two lakes, Whitepine and Whirligig, and their inflowing streams. The subspecies was extirpated from the original lakes by the ravages of acid rain in the late 1950s, but was saved from extinction by Paul Graf, a hatchery manager at the Ontario Ministry of Natural Resources. He had brought a brood stock of the fish into the hatchery at Hill's Lake near Charlton, Ontario. He sometimes feared the fish might have been taking up valuable space in the hatchery and, on several occasions, thought about getting rid of them, until they were found to have been extirpated from the wild.

Naturalised populations of aurora trout have been introduced into about a dozen lakes in northeastern Ontario as refugia. In the late 1980s, the original lakes were treated with lime to raise the pH to circumneutral conditions, and aurora trout were reintroduced. Natural reproduction of aurora trout has been documented in the original lakes since the reintroduction, but the pH in the lakes has since begun to decline again, presumably because of reservoirs of acidic particulate depositions in the watershed.
