= Stark Covered Bridge =

- U.S. National Register of Historic Places
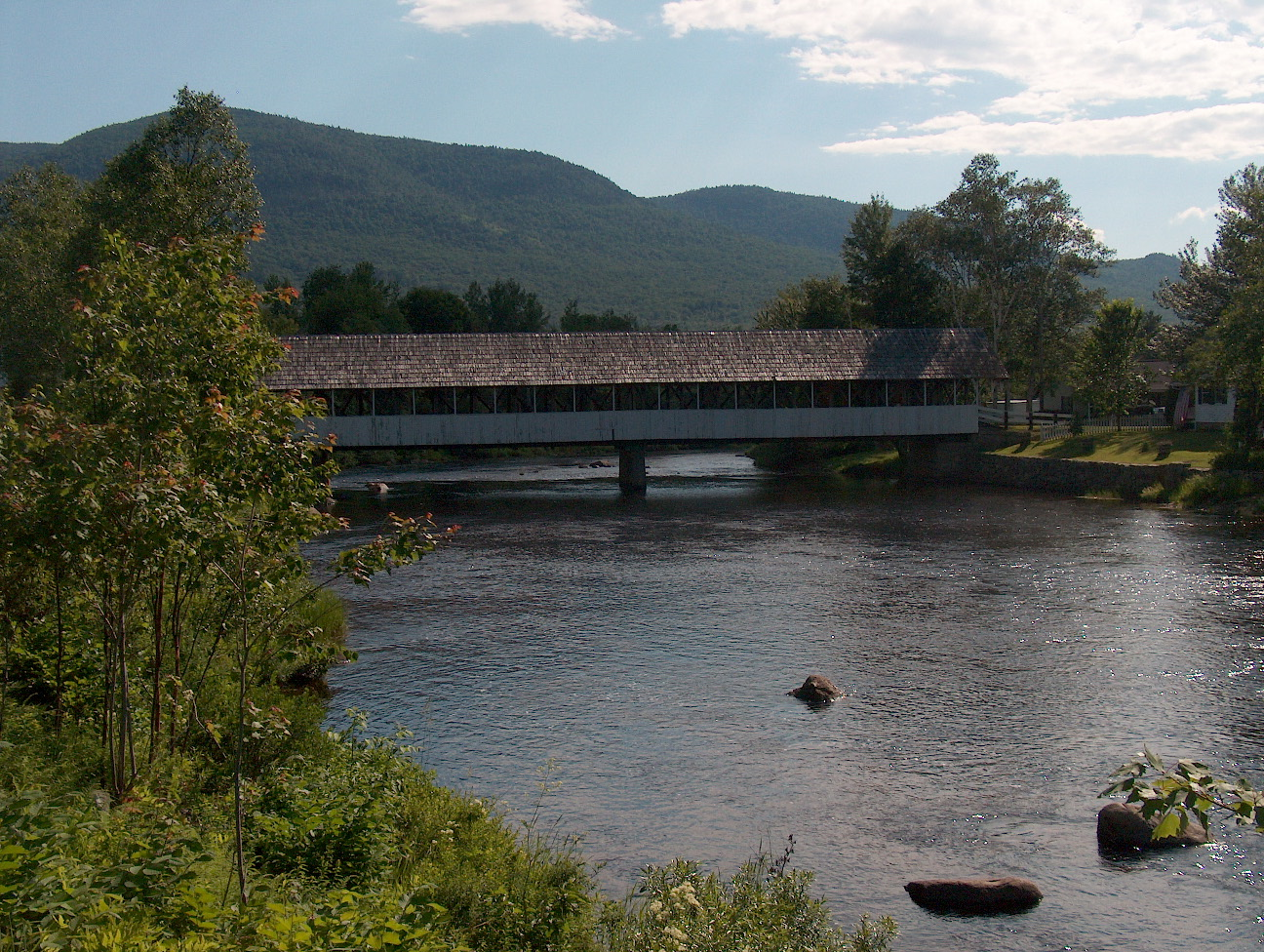

- Location within New Hampshire Location within the United States
- Nearest city: Stark, New Hampshire
- Coordinates: 44°36′3″N 71°24′30″W
- Area: less than one acre
- Built: 1857
- Architectural style: Paddleford truss
- NRHP reference No.: 80000283
- Added to NRHP: December 01, 1980

The Stark Covered Bridge is a historic wooden covered bridge over the Upper Ammonoosuc River in Stark, New Hampshire. It carries a connecting roadway which joins the Northside Road to New Hampshire Route 110.

== Size and measurements ==
It is a two-span Paddleford truss bridge, which is a regional variant of the Long truss. It is 151 feet (46 m) long with a span of 138 feet (42 m), and is 29 feet (8.8 m) wide, carrying an 18-foot (5.5 m) wide roadway and two 6.5-foot (2.0 m) sidewalks. The shore ends of the bridge rest on abutments of granite stone, while the center of the bridge is supported by a reinforced concrete pier, which is flared on the upstream side to deflect debris. The bridge is reinforced with steel beams, giving it a carrying capacity of 15 tons. It is decorated with pendant acorn finials and painted bright white.

== History ==
The bridge was built in either 1857 or 1862 (sources differing), replacing a floating bridge that had been located a short way upstream.

When originally built, the central pier was also of granite, but it was washed away, along with the bridge, in 1890 or 1895. The bridge survived the disaster, and was placed again on its abutments, and reinforced with laminated arches that were thought to eliminate the need for a central pier. This configuration survived until 1946, when sagging in the bridge prompted construction of a temporary wooden central pier. The bridge was rebuilt in 1954, adding the present concrete pier and the steel stringers, and removing the laminated arches.

The bridge was listed on the National Register of Historic Places in 1980.

== See also ==
- List of bridges on the National Register of Historic Places in New Hampshire
- List of New Hampshire covered bridges
- National Register of Historic Places listings in Coos County, New Hampshire
