= Christine Lake (New Hampshire) =

American water body

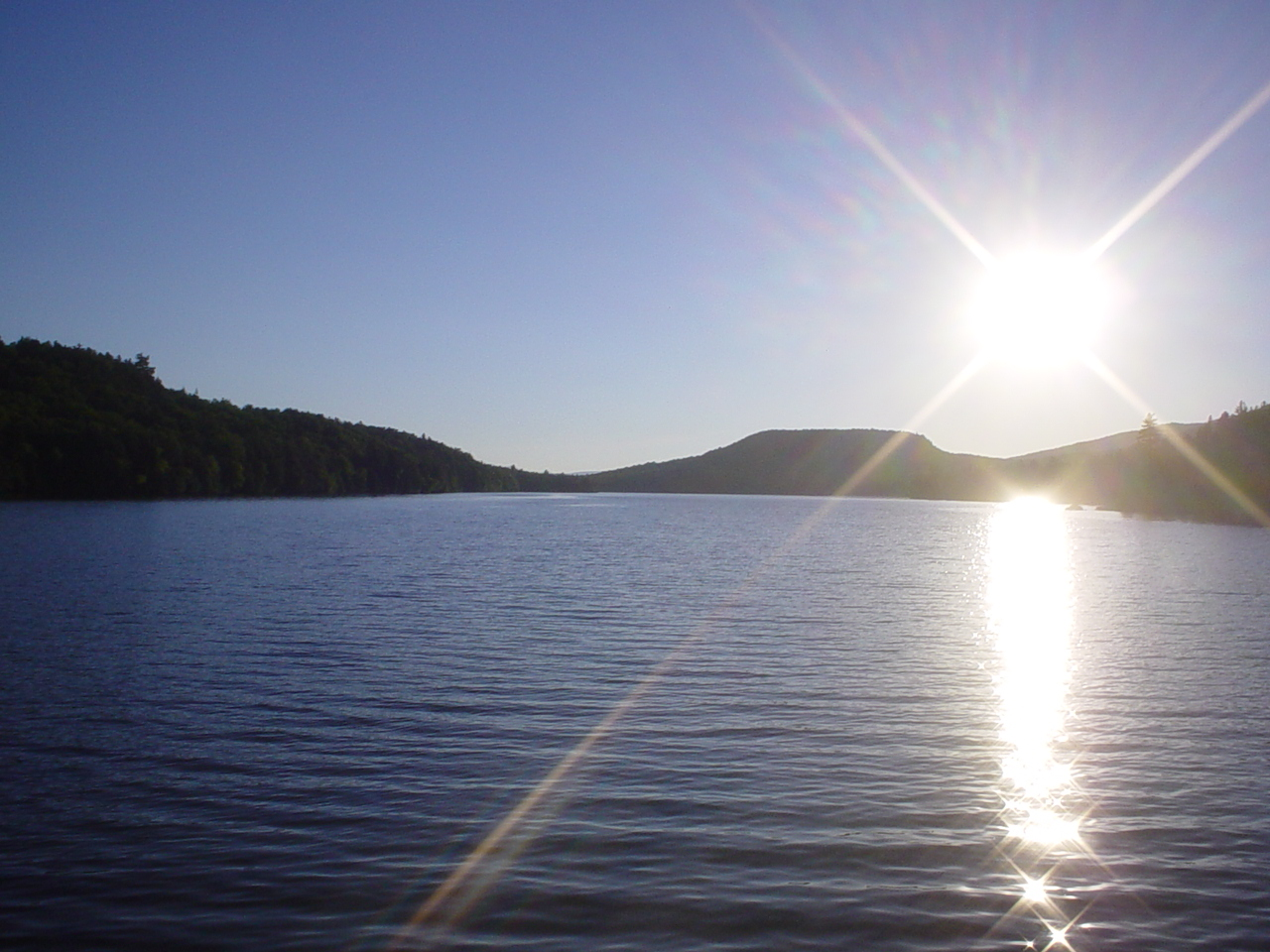
- Looking out from the beach area on a summer day

- Location in New Hampshire Location in the United States
- Location: Coos County, New Hampshire
- Coordinates: 44°37′50″N 71°24′26″W
- Primary inflows: Rowells Brook
- Primary outflows: tributary of Upper Ammonoosuc River
- Basin countries: United States
- Max. length: 1.4 mi (2.3 km)
- Max. width: 0.3 mi (0.48 km)
- Surface area: 197 acres (0.8 km^{2})
- Average depth: 24 ft (7.3 m)
- Max. depth: 65 ft (20 m)
- Surface elevation: 1,203 ft (367 m)
- Settlements: Stark

Christine Lake is a 197-acre (0.8 km^{2}) water body located in Coos County in northern New Hampshire, United States, in the town of Stark. The lake lies southeast of the Percy Peaks and north of the Upper Ammonoosuc River. The lake is fed by spring brooks on the upper end, and the water from Christine Lake flows via the Upper Ammonoosuc to the Connecticut River at Groveton and thence south to Long Island Sound.

The lake is classified as a coldwater fishery, with observed species including brook trout, brown trout, and smallmouth bass. Along with Dublin Pond, the lake was one of only two locations where the now extinct silver trout could be found.

== See also ==
- List of lakes in New Hampshire
