= Dublin Pond =

Lake in Cheshire County, New Hampshire

- Dublin Lake
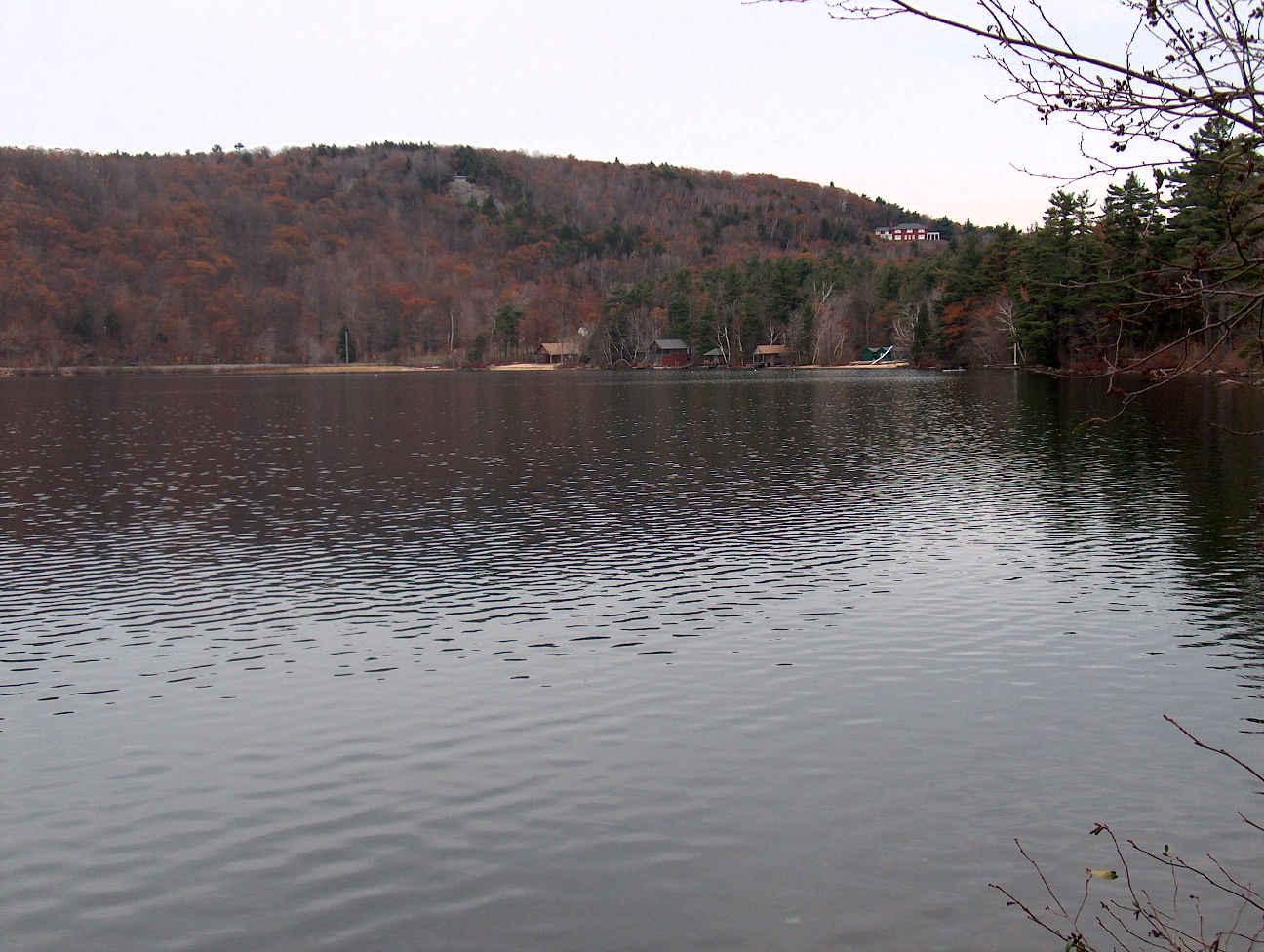

- Location within New Hampshire Location within the United States
- Location: Cheshire County, New Hampshire
- Coordinates: 42°54′23″N 72°05′02″W
- Primary outflows: tributary of Minnewawa Brook
- Basin countries: United States
- Max. length: 0.8 mi (1.3 km)
- Max. width: 0.6 mi (0.97 km)
- Surface area: 236 acres (0.96 km^{2})
- Average depth: 64 ft (20 m)
- Max. depth: 100 ft (30 m)
- Surface elevation: 1,480 ft (451 m)
- Settlements: Dublin

Dublin Pond or Dublin Lake is a 236-acre (0.96 km^{2}) water body located in Cheshire County in southwestern New Hampshire, United States, in the town of Dublin. The pond lies at an elevation of 1,480 feet (451 m) above sea level, near the height of land between the Connecticut River/Long Island Sound watershed to the west and the Merrimack River/Gulf of Maine watershed to the east.

== Description ==
Water from Dublin Pond flows west through a series of lakes into Minnewawa Brook, a tributary of the Ashuelot River, which flows to the Connecticut River at Hinsdale, New Hampshire. New Hampshire Route 101, a two-lane highway, runs along the northern shore of the lake, and the town center of Dublin is less than one mile to the east.

The state owns the 1.3 acre Dublin Lake Scenic Area on Route 101, which protects much of the north shore.

The lake is classified as a coldwater fishery, with observed species including smallmouth bass, largemouth bass, brook trout, and brown bullhead. Along with Christine Lake (New Hampshire) the lake was one of only two locations where the now extinct silver trout could be found.

45 historic buildings and 10 small boathouses around the lake are designated as the Dublin Lake Historic District. The buildings were part of a popular summer home community in the late 19th and early 20th centuries. Many prominent artists stayed in the community, including Thomas Wentworth Higginson, Abbott Handerson Thayer, and Joseph Lindon Smith. The district was added to the National Register of Historic Places in 1983.

== See also ==
- List of lakes in New Hampshire
- National Register of Historic Places listings in Cheshire County, New Hampshire
