= Dummer, New Hampshire =

- Town
- View towards Dummer, New Hampshire, from the south

- Seal

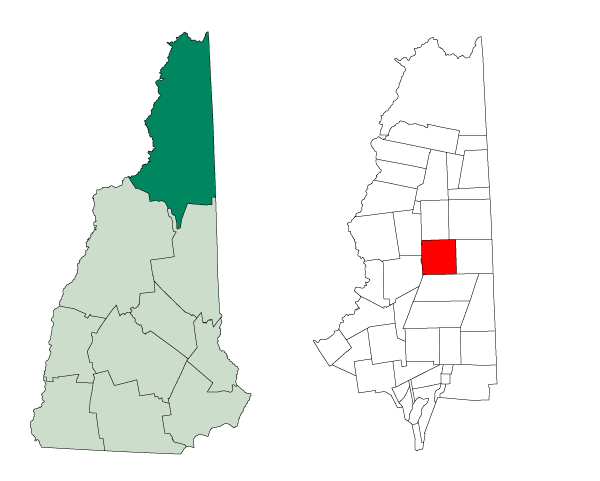
- Location in Coos County, New Hampshire
- Coordinates: 44°38′15″N 71°15′12″W
- Country: United States
- State: New Hampshire
- County: Coös
- Incorporated: 1848
- Villages: Paris

Area
  - Total: 49.2 sq mi (127.3 km^{2})
  - Land: 48.0 sq mi (124.2 km^{2})
  - Water: 1.2 sq mi (3.1 km^{2}) 2.44%
- Elevation: 1,316 ft (401 m)

Population (2020)
  - Total: 306
  - Density: 6.5/sq mi (2.5/km^{2})
- Time zone: UTC-5 (Eastern)
  - Summer (DST): UTC-4 (Eastern)
- ZIP code: 03588
- Area code: 603
- FIPS code: 33-19300
- GNIS feature ID: 873582
- Website: dummernh.com

Dummer is a town in Coös County, New Hampshire, United States. The population was 306 at the 2020 census, and an estimated 313 in 2025. Dummer is home to the Pontook Reservoir, popular with canoeists, kayakers and birdwatchers. In the western part of Dummer lies the village of Paris.

== History ==
The town was granted on March 8, 1773, by Governor John Wentworth to a group of wealthy Portsmouth investors, including his father, Mark Hunking Wentworth, Nathaniel Haven and others. He named it after Massachusetts Governor William Dummer, who successfully defended the eastern English provinces from the French and Indians in Dummer's War. But the town remained unsettled until 1812 when William Leighton arrived from Farmington, New Hampshire, with his family. Dummer was incorporated by the General Court on December 19, 1848.

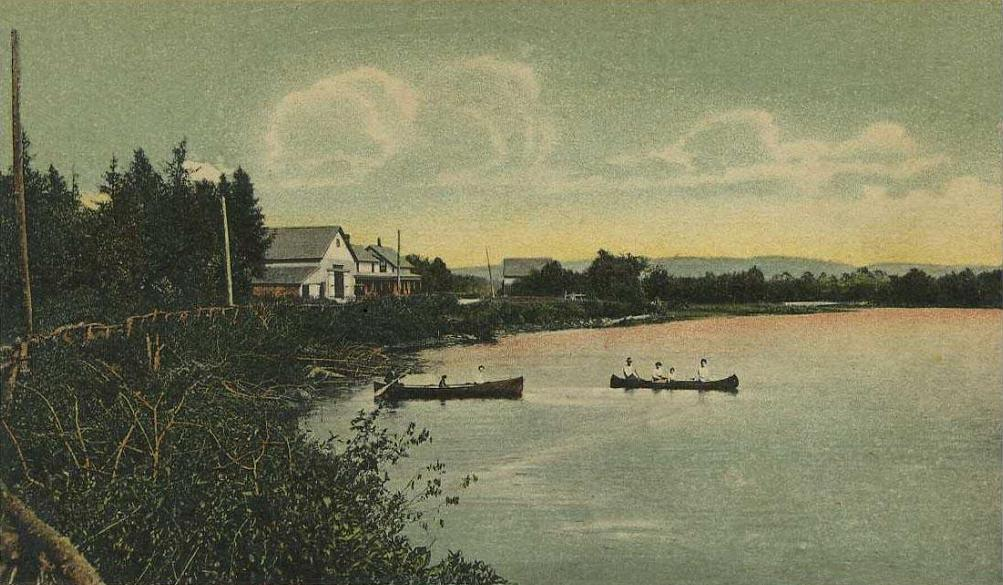
Pontook Reservoir in 1908

Mountainous terrain and sterility of the soil prevented cultivation. But the region had forests, and the Upper Ammonoosuc River provided water power for mills. There were two sawmills operating by 1859, with a considerable trade in timber. Log drives on the Androscoggin River supplied the papermills downstream in Berlin. Pontook Dam, which created Pontook Reservoir, was reconstructed in the mid-1980s to generate hydroelectric power.

== Geography ==
Dummer is in northern New Hampshire, close to the geographic center of Coos County. According to the U.S. Census Bureau, the town has a total area of 49.2 square miles (127.3 km^{2}), of which 48.0 square miles (124.2 km^{2}) are land and 1.2 square miles (3.1 km^{2}) are water, comprising 2.44% of the town. The highest point in Dummer is the summit of Cow Mountain, at 2,289 feet (698 m) above sea level in the northern part of the town. Roughly the western third of Dummer lies within the Connecticut River watershed, where it is drained by the Upper Ammonoosuc River, with the eastern two-thirds in the Androscoggin River watershed. The former community of Paris is in the western part of town, along Phillips Brook.

Dummer is crossed by New Hampshire Route 16.

== Demographics ==
Historical population
Census	Pop.	Note	%±
1810	7		—
1820	27		285.7%
1830	65		140.7%
1840	57		−12.3%
1850	171		200.0%
1860	289		69.0%
1870	317		9.7%
1880	464		46.4%
1890	455		−1.9%
1900	349		−23.3%
1910	292		−16.3%
1920	266		−8.9%
1930	298		12.0%
1940	274		−8.1%
1950	229		−16.4%
1960	202		−11.8%
1970	225		11.4%
1980	390		73.3%
1990	327		−16.2%
2000	309		−5.5%
2010	304		−1.6%
2020	306		0.7%
U.S. Decennial Census

As of the census of 2000, there were 309 people, 128 households, and 102 families living in the town. The population density was 6.5 inhabitants per square mile (2.5/km^{2}). There were 252 housing units at an average density of 5.3 per square mile (2.0/km^{2}). The racial makeup of the town was 98.71% White, 0.32% Asian, and 0.97% from two or more races.

There were 128 households, out of which 30.5% had children under the age of 18 living with them, 64.8% were married couples living together, 10.9% had a female householder with no husband present, and 20.3% were non-families. 19.5% of all households were made up of individuals, and 5.5% had someone living alone who was 65 years of age or older. The average household size was 2.40 and the average family size was 2.73.

In the town, the population was spread out, with 24.3% under the age of 18, 3.9% from 18 to 24, 28.5% from 25 to 44, 30.4% from 45 to 64, and 12.9% who were 65 years of age or older. The median age was 42 years. For every 100 females, there were 103.3 males. For every 100 females age 18 and over, there were 100.0 males.

The median income for a household in the town was $32,750, and the median income for a family was $42,708. Males had a median income of $29,286 versus $22,083 for females. The per capita income for the town was $16,754. About 4.6% of families and 6.7% of the population were below the poverty line, including 2.4% of those under the age of eighteen and 10.0% of those 65 or over.

== Adjacent municipalities ==
- Millsfield (north)
- Errol (northeast)
- Cambridge (east)
- Milan (south)
- Stark (southwest)
- Odell (northwest)
