= Phillips Brook =

- Location within New Hampshire Location within the United States

Location
- Country: United States
- State: New Hampshire
- County: Coos
- Townships: Erving's Location, Odell, Millsfield, Dummer, Stark

Physical characteristics
- Source
  - location: Erving's Location
  - coordinates: 44°48′59″N 71°20′52″W
  - elevation: 2,405 ft (733 m)
- Mouth: Upper Ammonoosuc River
  - location: Stark
  - coordinates: 44°36′47″N 71°20′30″W
  - elevation: 970 ft (300 m)
- Length: 19.6 mi (31.5 km)

Phillips Brook is a 19.6-mile-long (31.5 km) river in northern New Hampshire in the United States. It is a tributary of the Upper Ammonoosuc River and part of the Connecticut River watershed.

Phillips Brook rises in the township of Erving's Location, New Hampshire, in the vicinity of Kelsey Notch, and flows south through Odell, Millsfield and Dummer to join the Upper Ammonoosuc River in the town of Stark near the village of Crystal. For most of its length it flows through wild country with a long history of timber harvesting.

== See also ==
- List of New Hampshire rivers
