= Toddy Pond (Maine) =

- Location within Maine Location within the United States
- Location: Hancock County, Maine
- Coordinates: 44°32′N 68°37′W
- Lake type: Reservoir
- Basin countries: United States
- Max. length: 8 mi (13 km)
- Max. width: 1,100 yd (1 km)
- Surface area: 2,408 acres (974 ha)
- Max. depth: 122 ft (37 m)
- Water volume: 49,989 acre⋅ft (61,661,000 m^{3})
- Surface elevation: 164 ft (50 m)

Toddy Pond is a narrow lake, eight-miles long, in Hancock County, Maine. South Toddy leads from Surry and Blue Hill townships via a narrow channel to Middle Toddy that is edged by Surry and Penobscot townships. All of North Toddy, which is connected to Middle Toddy by another narrow channel, lies in Orland township. U.S. Route One crosses the northern end of the lake, paralleling the dam through which the waters of Toddy Pond flow down to Alamoosook Lake and thence eventually to the Penobscot River. A public boat landing is located off Route One. The cold water of North Toddy is home to a self-sustaining population of lake trout; it is also stocked with splake, brown trout, and land-locked Atlantic salmon. Smallmouth bass and white perch thrive in the warmer water of Middle and South Toddy. In spring the lake is a spawning venue for alewife. The Toddy Pond Association was established in 1999 by concerned property owners in order to protect the lake and its watershed and educate members about relevant environmental issues.
