= Odell, New Hampshire =

Township in Coos County, New Hampshire, United States

- Township
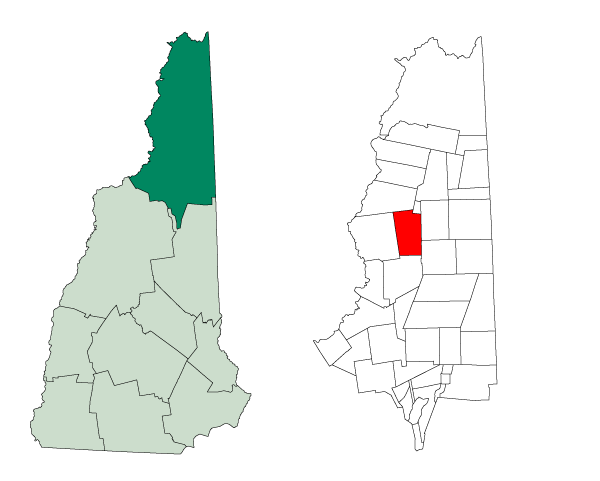
- Location in Coös County, New Hampshire
- Coordinates: 44°43′56″N 71°22′27″W
- Country: United States
- State: New Hampshire
- County: Coös

Area
  - Total: 45.0 sq mi (116.6 km^{2})
  - Land: 44.3 sq mi (114.8 km^{2})
  - Water: 0.69 sq mi (1.8 km^{2}) 1.53%
- Elevation: 3,110 ft (950 m)

Population (2020)
  - Total: 1
  - Density: 0.026/sq mi (0.01/km^{2})
- Time zone: UTC-5 (Eastern)
  - Summer (DST): UTC-4 (Eastern)
- Area code: 603
- FIPS code: 33-007-57860
- GNIS feature ID: 873691

Odell is a township in Coös County, New Hampshire, United States. The 2020 census recorded one person living in the township.

In New Hampshire, locations, grants, townships (which are different from towns), and purchases are unincorporated portions of a county which are not part of any town and have limited self-government (if any, as many are uninhabited).

== History ==
The township takes its name from Richard Odell of Conway, who bought 23,751 acres (96.12 km^{2}) from the state in 1834 for $1,863.

== Geography ==
A substantial portion of the state-owned Nash Stream Forest lies within the township. There are three mountains, each having elevations above 3,000 feet (910 m): Muise Mountain, Whitcomb Mountain and Long Mountain, whose two summits are the two highest points in Odell, at 3,661 feet (1,116 m) above sea level each. There are only a few rough roads and no highways here.

According to the United States Census Bureau, the township has a total area of 45.0 square miles (116.6 km^{2}), of which 44.3 square miles (114.8 km^{2}) are land and 0.69 square miles (1.8 km^{2}), or 1.53%, are water. The west side of the township drains to Nash Stream, while the east side drains to Phillips Brook. Both are south-flowing tributaries of the Upper Ammonoosuc River and part of the Connecticut River watershed.

=== Adjacent municipalities ===
- Erving's Location (northeast)
- Millsfield (east)
- Dummer (southeast)
- Stark (south)
- Stratford (west)
- Columbia (northwest)

== Demographics ==
Historical population
Census	Pop.	Note	%±
1860	1		—
1920	73		—
1930	0		−100.0%
1940	82		—
1950	12		−85.4%
1960	0		−100.0%
1970	3		—
1980	0		−100.0%
1990	0		—
2000	5		—
2010	4		−20.0%
2020	1		−75.0%
U.S. Decennial Census

As of the 2000 census, there were 5 people, 4 households, and 1 family residing in the township. There were 73 housing units at an average density of 1.6 per square mile (0.6/km^{2}). The racial makeup of the township was 100.00% White.

There were 4 households, out of which 1 was a married couple living together and 3 were non-families. 3 households were made up of individuals, and 2 had someone living alone who was 65 years of age or older. The average household size was 1.25 and the average family size was 2.00.

In the township the population was spread out, with 1 person from 18 to 24, 1 person from 25 to 44, 1 person from 45 to 64, and 2 people who were 65 years of age or older. The median age was 50 years. For every 100 females, there were 66.7 males. For every 100 females age 18 and over, there were 66.7 males.
