= Pontook Reservoir =

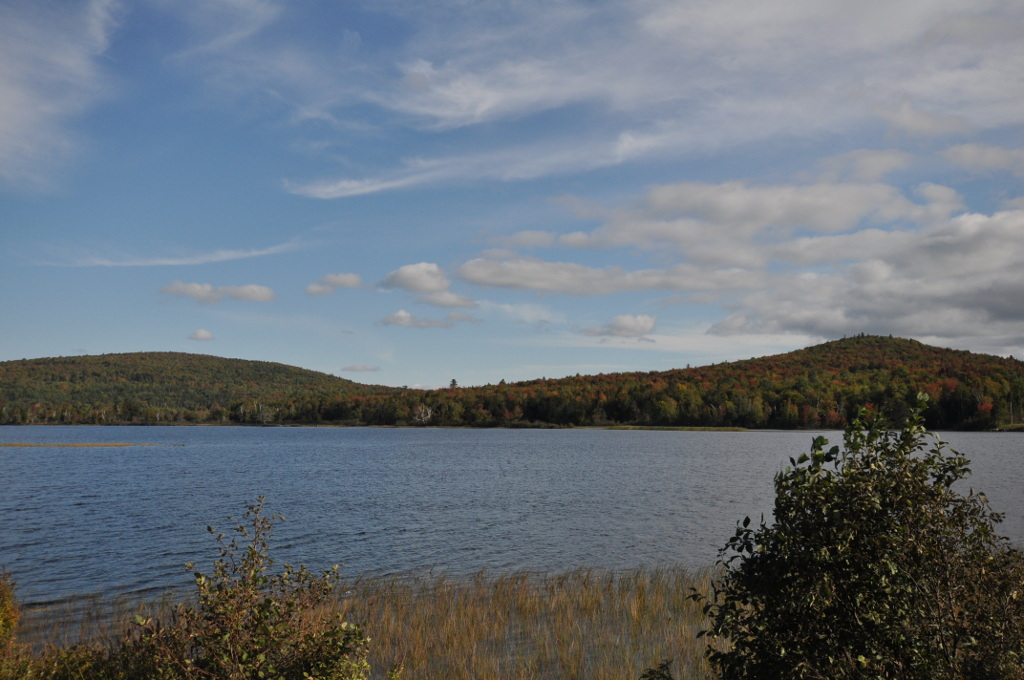

- Location within New Hampshire Location within the United States
- Location: Coos County, New Hampshire
- Coordinates: 44°37′58″N 71°14′54″W
- Type: Reservoir
- Primary inflows: Androscoggin River
- Primary outflows: Androscoggin River
- Basin countries: United States
- Max. length: 2.1 miles (3.4 km)
- Max. width: 0.3 miles (0.48 km)
- Surface area: 379 acres (1.53 km^{2})
- Average depth: 4 ft (1.2 m)
- Max. depth: 15 ft (4.6 m)
- Surface elevation: 1,163 feet (354 m)
- Islands: 2
- Settlements: Dummer

Pontook Reservoir is a 379-acre (1.53 km^{2}) impoundment on the Androscoggin River in Coos County in northern New Hampshire, United States. The dam and impoundment are located in the town of Dummer. The reservoir was created for hydroelectric power generation.

== See also ==
- List of lakes in New Hampshire
