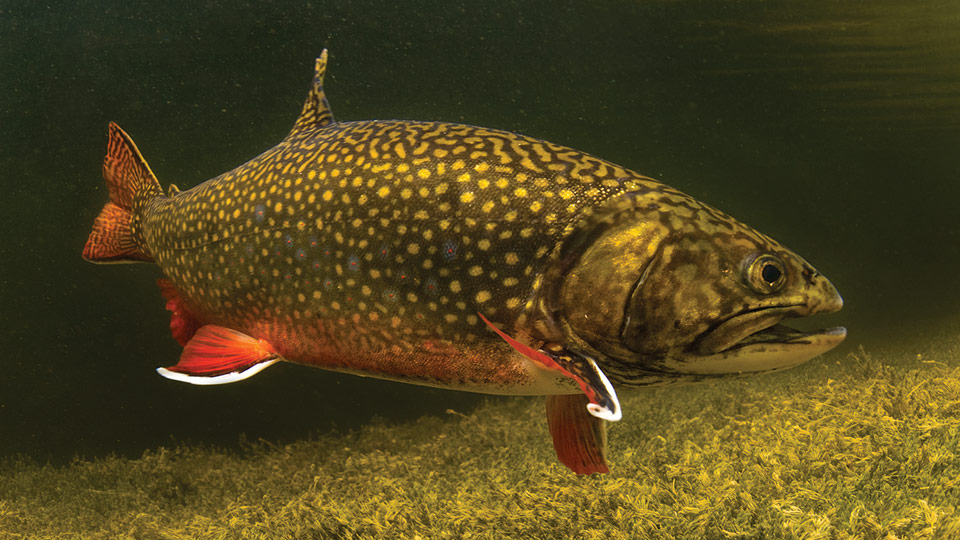

Conservation status
- Least Concern (IUCN 3.1)

- Secure (NatureServe)

Scientific classification
- Kingdom: Animalia
- Phylum: Chordata
- Class: Actinopterygii
- Division: Teleostei
- Order: Salmoniformes
- Family: Salmonidae
- Genus: Salvelinus
- Subgenus: Baione
- Species: S. fontinalis

Binomial name
- Salvelinus fontinalis (Mitchill, 1814)

Subspecies
- †S. f. agassizii (Garman, 1885); S. f. timagamiensis Henn & Rinckenbach, 1925

Synonyms
- previous scientific names: Salmo fontinalis Mitchill, 1814 Baione fontinalis (Mitchill, 1814) Salmo canadensis Griffith & Smith, 1834 Salmo hudsonicus Suckley, 1861 Salvelinus timagamiensis Henn & Rinckenbach, 1925

= Brook trout =

Species of fish

The brook trout (Salvelinus fontinalis) is a species of freshwater fish in the char genus Salvelinus of the salmon family Salmonidae native to Eastern North America in the United States and Canada. In parts of its range, it is also known as the eastern brook trout, speckled trout, brook char (or charr), squaretail, brookie, or mud trout, among others.

Two ecological forms of brook trout have been recognized by the US Forest Service. One ecological form is the long-lived potamodromous populations in Lake Superior known as coaster trout or coasters. The second ecological form is the short-living predaceous anadromous populations which are found in northern lakes and coastal rivers from Long Island to Hudson Bay, which are referred to as salters. Adult coaster brook trout are capable of reaching sizes over 2 feet in length and weigh up to 6.8 kg (15 lb), whereas adult salters average between 6 and 15 inches in length and weigh between 0.5 and 2.3 kg (1 and 5 lb). The brook trout is characterized by its distinctive olive-green body with yellow and blue-rimmed red spots, white and black edged orange fins, and dorsal vermiculation. The diet of the brook trout is restrictive to the season and location of the fish, but will typically consist of terrestrial and aquatic insects, fry, crustaceans, zooplankton, and worms.

Throughout history, non-native brook trout have been transplanted beyond its native borders, where it has spread across North America and much of the world. These brook trout have been introduced since the 1800s by means of artificial propagation and aquaculture in hope of promoting fishery resources. Through this transplantation, brook trout have been observed to affect native populations by outcompeting, preying upon, and hybridizing with many native aquatic species. This invasive nature via human-mediated introductory has led to their classification in the list of the top 100 globally invasive species.

Since the 19th century, isolated native eastern brook trout populations have faced extirpation due to stream pollution, habitat destruction, invasive species, and waterway damming. Although facing these pressures, the brook trout is not listed as an endangered species by the International Union for Conservation of Nature, but native population decline has been observed.

== Taxonomy ==
The scientific name of the brook trout is Salvelinus fontinalis. Initially, the brook trout was scientifically described as Salmo fontinalis by the naturalist Samuel Latham Mitchill in 1814. The species was later moved to the char genus Salvelinus, which in North America also includes the lake trout, bull trout, Dolly Varden, and the Arctic char. The specific epithet "fontinalis" comes from the Latin for "of a spring or fountain", in reference to the clear, cold streams and ponds in its native habitat.

=== Subspecies ===
There is little recognized systematic substructure in the brook trout, but the two subspecies have been proposed. The aurora trout (S. f. timagamiensis) is a subspecies native to two lakes in the Temiskaming District of Ontario, Canada. The silver trout (S. agassizii or S. f. agassizii) is an extinct trout species or subspecies last seen in Dublin Pond, New Hampshire, in 1930. It is considered by fisheries biologist Robert J. Behnke as a highly specialized form of brook trout.

=== Hybrids ===
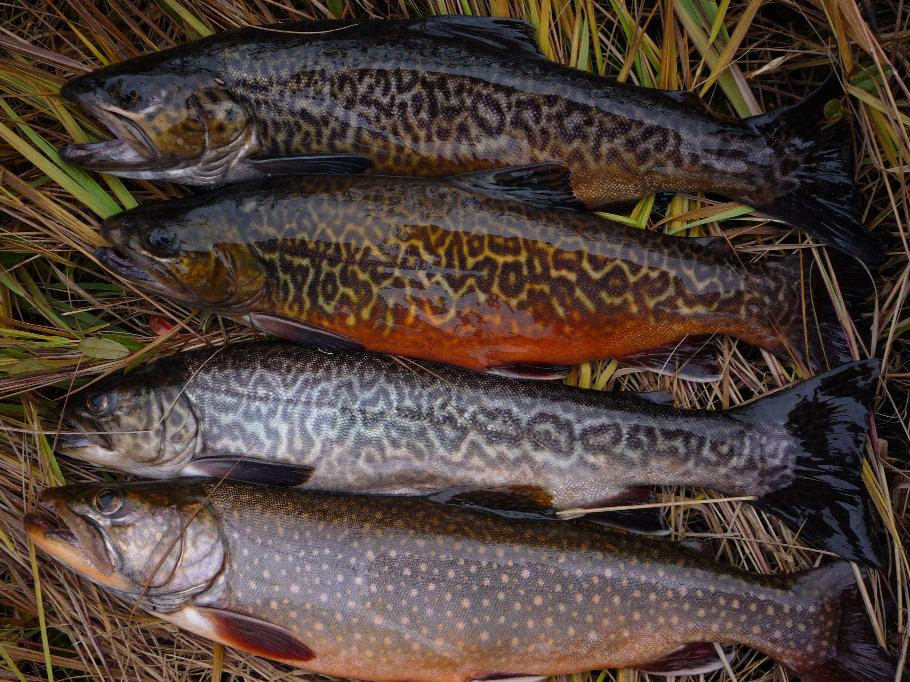
Tiger trout (top three), splake (bottom)

The brook trout produces hybrids both with its congeners the lake trout (S. namaycush) and the Arctic char (S. alpinus), and intergeneric hybrids with the brown trout (Salmo trutta).

The splake is an intrageneric hybrid between the brook trout and lake trout (S. namaycush). Although uncommon in nature, they are artificially propagated in substantial numbers for stocking into brook trout or lake trout habitats. Although they are fertile, back-crossing in nature is behaviorally problematic and very little natural reproduction occurs. Splake grow more quickly than brook trout, become piscivorous sooner, and are more tolerant of competitors than brook trout.

The tiger trout is an intergeneric hybrid between the brook trout and the brown trout. Tiger trout rarely occur naturally but are sometimes artificially propagated. Such crosses are almost always reproductively sterile. They are popular with many fish-stocking programs because they can grow quickly, and may help keep coarse fish (wild non "sport" fish) populations in check due to their highly piscivorous (fish-eating) nature.

The sparctic char is an intrageneric hybrid between the brook trout and the Arctic char.

== Ecological forms ==
The United States Forest Service has recognized two ecological forms of brook trout, salters and coasters. The forms express the same general features but vary in size, behavior, and location.

=== Coasters ===
A potamodromous population of brook trout native to lacustrine regions, which migrate into tributary rivers to spawn, are called "coasters". Coasters tend to be larger than most other populations of brook trout, often reaching 6 to 7 lb (2.7 to 3.2 kg) in size. They also commonly live for longer periods of time and exhibit more predacious behavior than their counterparts. Many coaster populations have been severely reduced by overfishing and habitat loss by the construction of hydroelectric power dams on Lake Superior tributaries. In Ontario, Michigan, and Minnesota efforts are underway to restore and recover coaster populations.

=== Salters ===
When Europeans first settled in Eastern North America, semi-anadromous or sea-run brook trout, commonly called "salters", ranged from southern New Jersey, north throughout the Canadian maritime provinces, and west to Hudson Bay. Salters are a short-lived form of brook trout that inhabit smaller bodies of water and exhibit less predacious behavior than coasters. They may spend up to three months at sea feeding on crustaceans, fish, and marine worms in the spring. During this time they won't stray more than a few miles from the river mouth, but then return to freshwater tributaries to spawn in the late summer or autumn. While in saltwater, salters gain a more silvery color, losing much of the distinctive markings seen in freshwater. However, within two weeks of returning to freshwater, they assume typical brook trout color and markings. Salters have faced threats such as habitat destruction, water pollution, and water way damming that have led to their declining population numbers across the Northeastern United States.

== Description ==
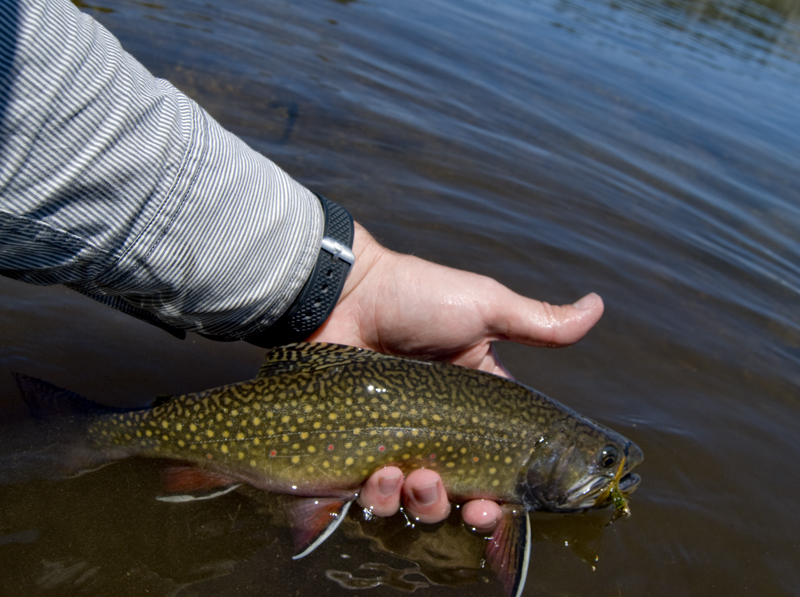
Brook trout from lake in Wyoming's Wind River Range

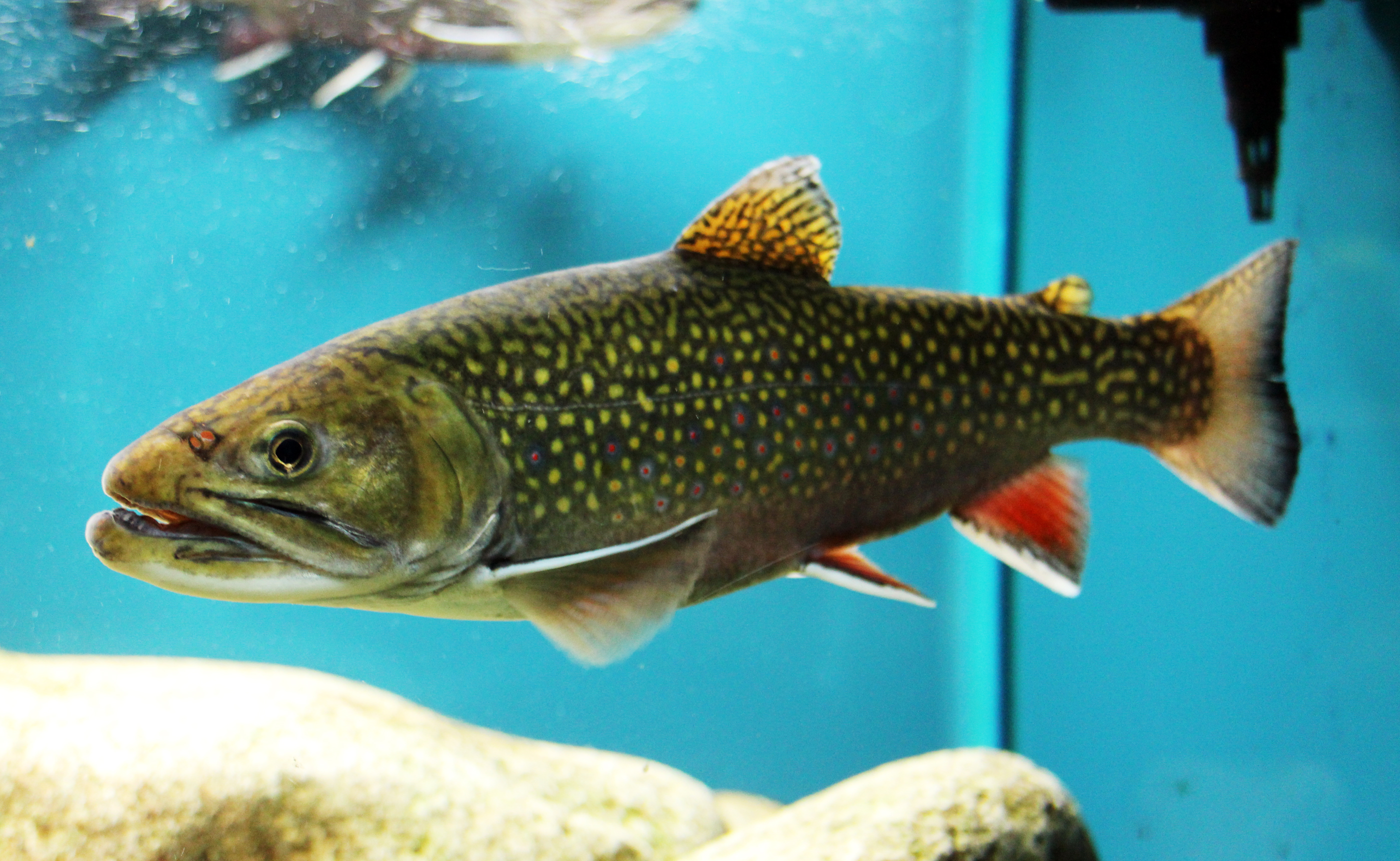
Captive brook trout in an aquarium

The brook trout has a dark green to brown color, with a distinctive marbled pattern (called vermiculation) of lighter shades across the flanks and back and extending at least to the dorsal fin, and often to the tail. A distinctive sprinkling of red dots, surrounded by blue halos, occurs along the flanks. The belly and lower fins are reddish in color, the latter with white leading edges. Often, the belly, particularly of the males, becomes very red or orange when the fish are spawning. Typical lengths of the brook trout vary from 25 to 65 cm (9.8 to 25.6 in), and weights from 0.3 to 3 kg (11 oz to 6 lb 10 oz). The maximum recorded length is 86 cm (34 in) and maximum weight 6.6 kg (14 lb 9 oz). Brook trout can reach at least seven years of age, with reports of 15-year-old specimens observed in California habitats to which the species has been introduced. Growth rates are dependent on season, age, water and ambient air temperatures, and flow rates. In general, flow rates affect the rate of change in the relationship between temperature and growth rate. For example, in spring, growth increased with temperature at a faster rate with high flow rates than with low flow rates.

== Range and habitat ==
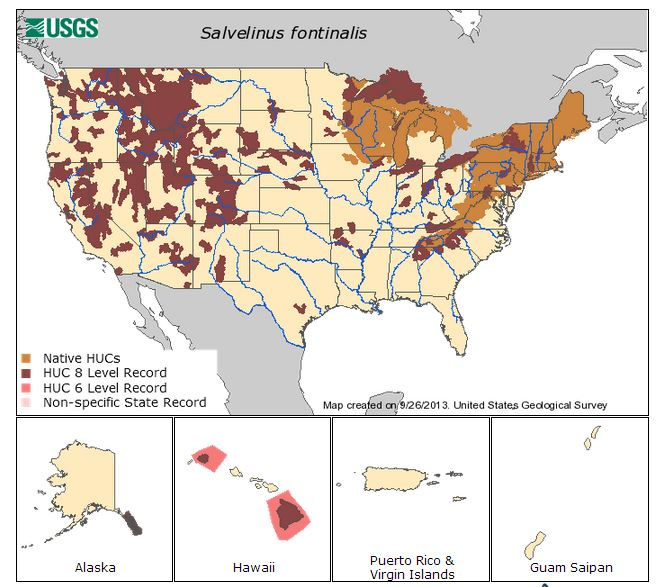
U.S. native and introduced ranges of brook trout (Salvelinus fontinalis)

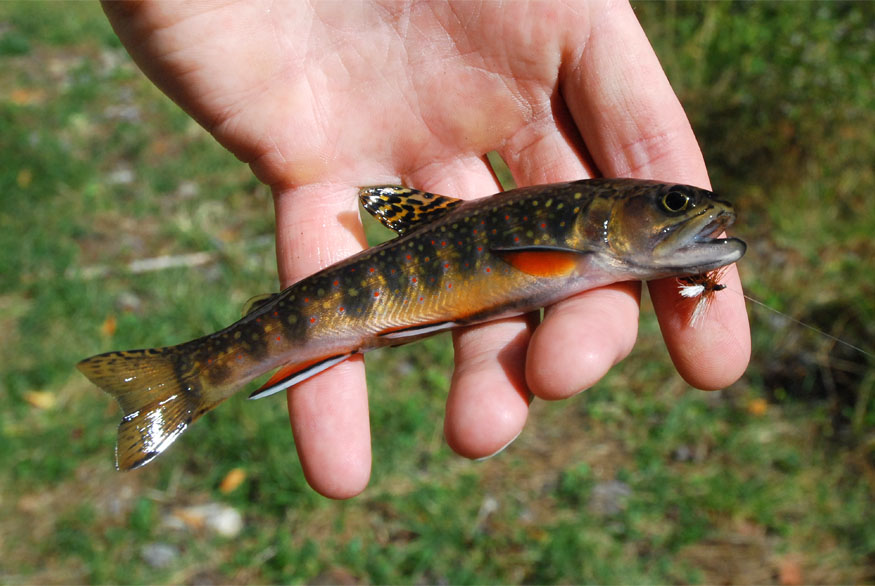
Native Appalachian brook trout

Brook trout are native to a wide area of Eastern North America, but are increasingly confined to higher elevations southward in the Appalachian Mountains to northern Georgia and northwest South Carolina, Canada from the Hudson Bay basin east, the Great Lakes–Saint Lawrence system, the Canadian maritime provinces, and the upper Mississippi River drainage as far west as eastern Iowa. Their southern historic native range has been drastically reduced, with fish being restricted to higher-elevation, remote streams due to habitat loss and introductions of brown and rainbow trout. As early as 1850, the brook trout's range started to extend west from its native range through introductions. The brook trout was eventually introduced into suitable habitats throughout the western U.S. during the late 19th and early 20th centuries at the behest of the American Acclimatization Society and by private, state, and federal fisheries authorities. Acclimatization movements in Europe, South America, and Oceania resulted in brook trout introductions throughout Europe, in Argentina, and New Zealand. Although not all introductions were successful, a great many established wild, self-sustaining populations of brook trout in non-native waters.

=== Habitat ===
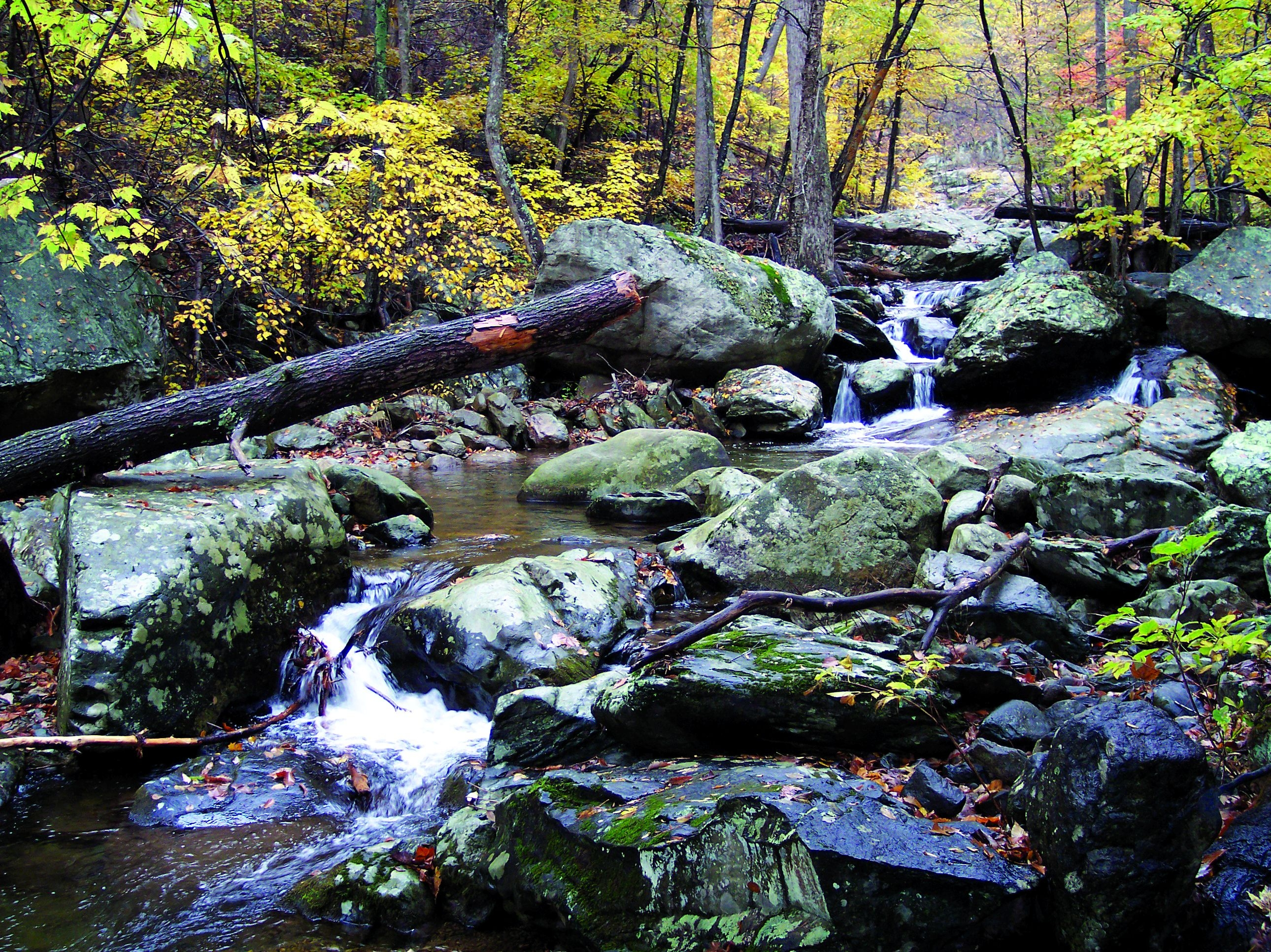
Typical southern Appalachian brook trout habitat

The brook trout inhabits large and small lakes, rivers, streams, creeks, and spring ponds in cold temperate climates with mild precipitation. Clear spring water with adequate cover and moderate flow rates is indicative of strong habitability for brook trout. They exhibit high levels of adaptability when exposed to habitat changes from environmental effects, and have been observed to exhibit more resilience to habitat change than other Salvelinus species. The typical pH range of brook trout waters is 5.0 to 7.5, with pH extremes of 3.5 to 9.8 possible. Water temperatures typically range from 34 to 72 °F (1 to 22 °C). Warm summer temperatures and low flow rates are stressful on brook trout populations—especially larger fish.

== Ecology and reproduction ==
=== Diet ===
Brook trout have a diverse diet that includes larval, pupal, adult forms of aquatic insects (typically caddisflies, stoneflies, mayflies, and aquatic dipterans), adult forms of terrestrial insects (typically ants, beetles, grasshoppers, and crickets) that fall into the water, crustaceans, frogs and other amphibians, molluscs, smaller fish, invertebrates, and even small aquatic mammals such as voles and sometimes other young brook trout.

=== Reproduction ===
The female constructs a depression in a location in the stream bed, sometimes referred to as a "redd", where groundwater percolates upward through the gravel. One or more males approach the female, fertilizing the eggs as the female expresses them. Most spawning involve peripheral males, which directly influences the number of eggs that survive into adulthood. In general, the larger the number of peripheral males present, the more likely the eggs will be cannibalized. The eggs are slightly denser than water. The female then buries the eggs in a small gravel mound where they hatch in 4 to 6 weeks.

== Life cycle ==
Following the deposition of up to 5,000 eggs in gravel beds by the female brook trout, the eggs enter an incubation period from the winter months to early spring. During this incubation period, the eggs source oxygen from the stream that passes through the gravel beds and into their gel-like shells. The eggs will then successively hatch into miniature fry that rely upon their yolk sac for nutrients to compensate for the lack of nutrients provided by the parental trout during the early stages of development. In the ensuing stage of their life cycle, the fry will seek cover from predatory species in rock crevices and inlets. During this period of hiding, the trout will begin to mature into fingerlings by summer and start expressing parr marks to aid in camouflage. At this point, most brook trout will be between 2 and 3 inches in length. Finally, in succeeding months, the trout will fully mature into a trout that is approximately between 10 and 34 inches long and capable of spawning in the fall months. These fully developed adult brook trout will express a vibrant olive-green back, cherry red underbelly, black accented fins, and wavy dorsal patterns. A typical adult brook trout will live to the age of 3 to 4 years old, with occasional brooks living to over the age of 4.

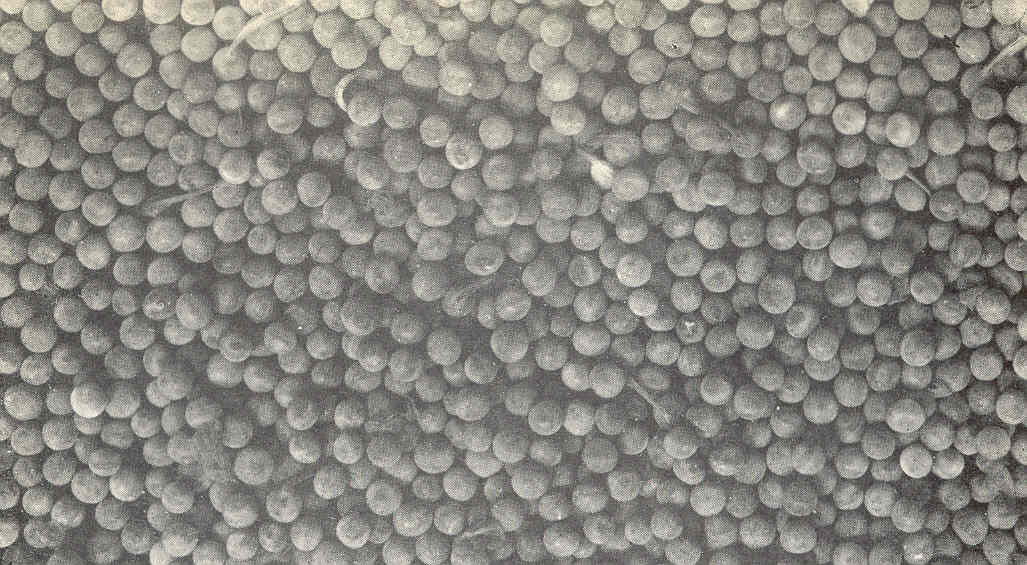
Brook trout eggs after the spawning of a female

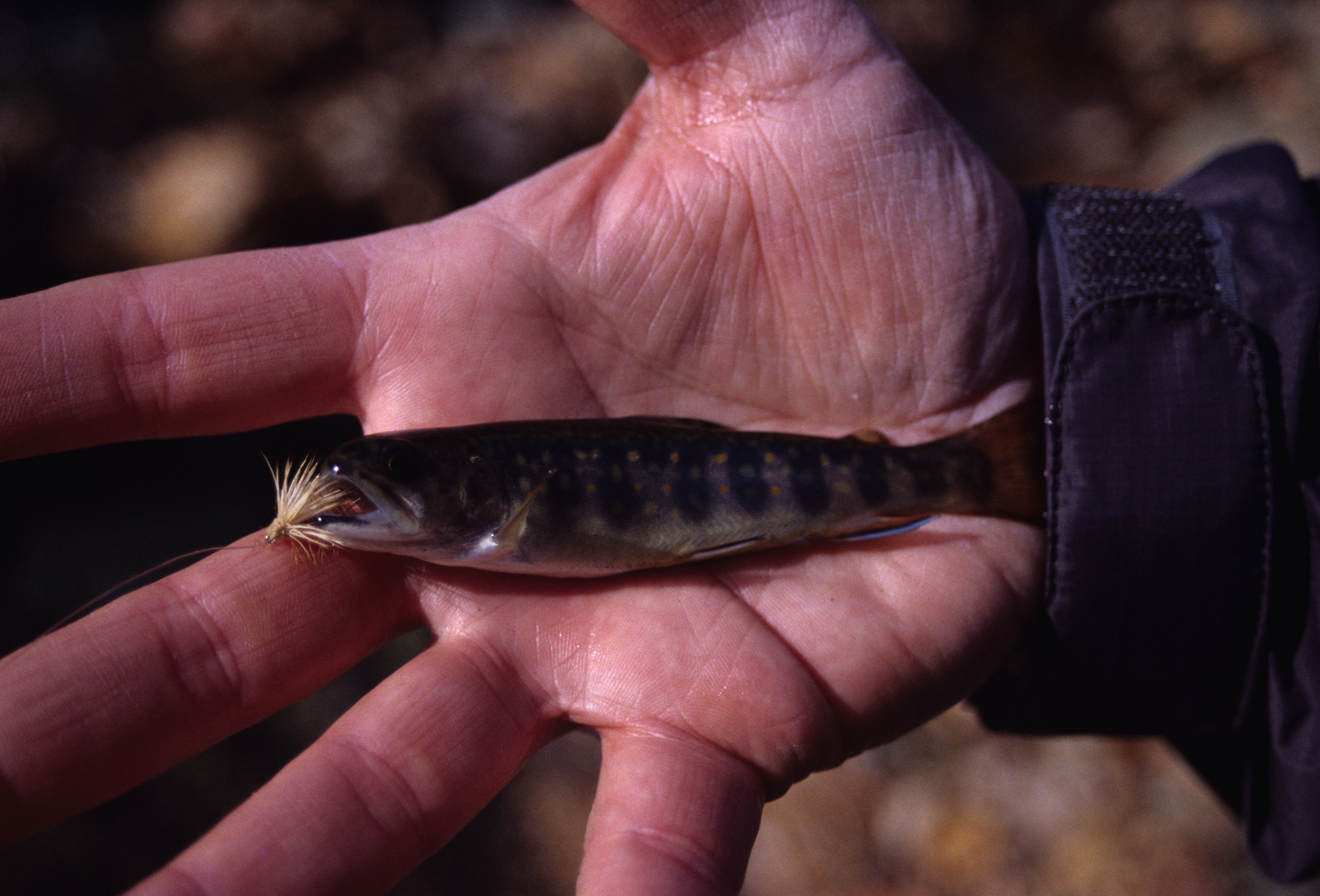
Brook trout fingerling with visible parr marks

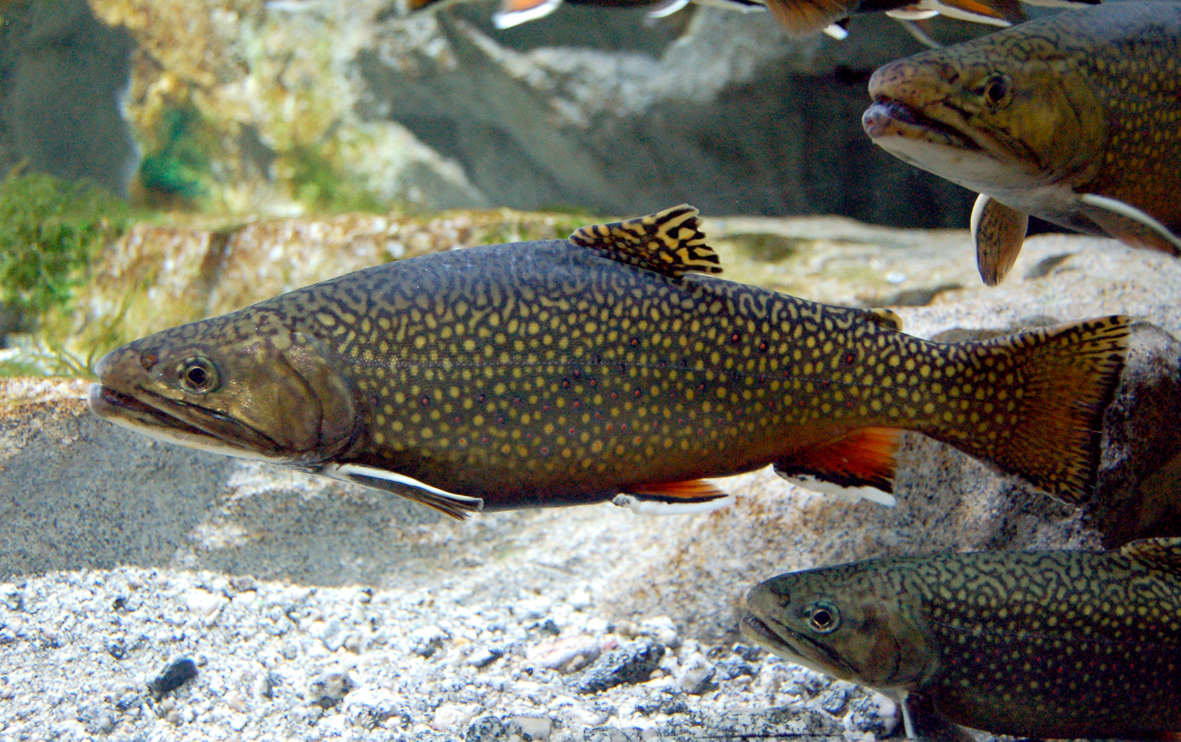
Typical adult brook trout

== Angling ==
The brook trout is a popular game fish with anglers, particularly fly fishermen.

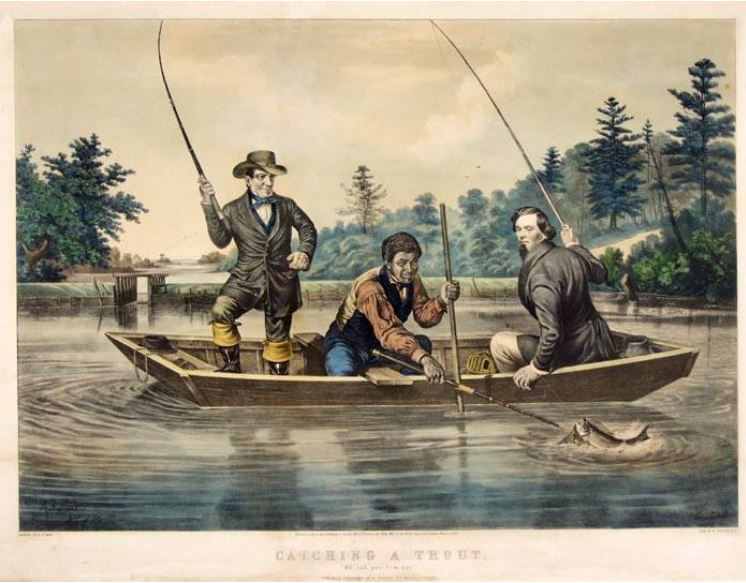
Nathan Currier lithograph of Arthur Fitzwilliam Tait's painting "Catching a Trout", 1854, depicts fishermen catching a brook trout near South Haven Church in a mill pond on Carmans River in Long Island, New York. Purportedly it illustrates an occasion when Daniel Webster, an avid angler, caught a large (about 14.5 lb (6.6 kg)) brook trout at the location in 1823 (or 1827).

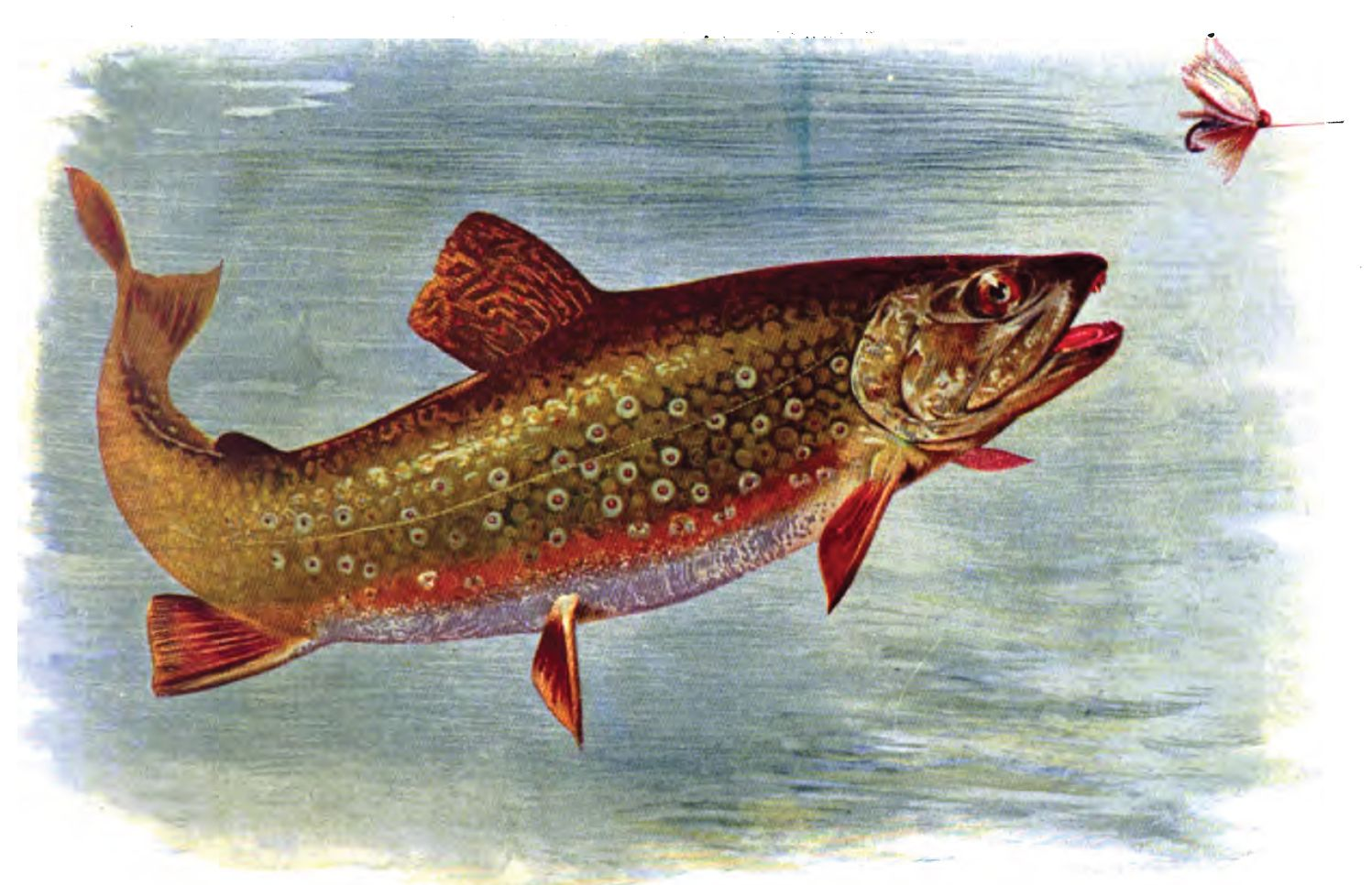
Brook trout chasing an artificial fly from American Fishes (1903)

Until it was displaced by introduced brown trout (1883) and rainbow trout (1875), the brook trout attracted the most attention of anglers from colonial times through the first 100 years of U.S. history. Sporting writers such as Genio Scott Fishing in American Waters (1869), Thaddeus Norris American Anglers Book (1864), Robert Barnwell Roosevelt Game Fish of North America (1864) and Charles Hallock The Fishing Tourist (1873) produced guides to the best-known brook trout waters in America. As brook trout populations declined in the mid-19th century near urban areas, anglers flocked to the Adirondacks in upstate New York and the Rangeley lakes region in Maine to pursue brook trout. In July 1916 on the Nipigon River in northern Ontario, an Ontario physician, John W. Cook, caught a 14 lb 8 oz (6.57 kg) brook trout, which stands as the IGFA world record. Today, many anglers practice catch-and-release tactics to preserve remaining populations. Organizations such as Trout Unlimited have been at the forefront of efforts to institute air and water quality standards sufficient to protect the brook trout. Revenues derived from the sale of fishing licenses have been used to restore many sections of creeks and streams to brook trout habitat.

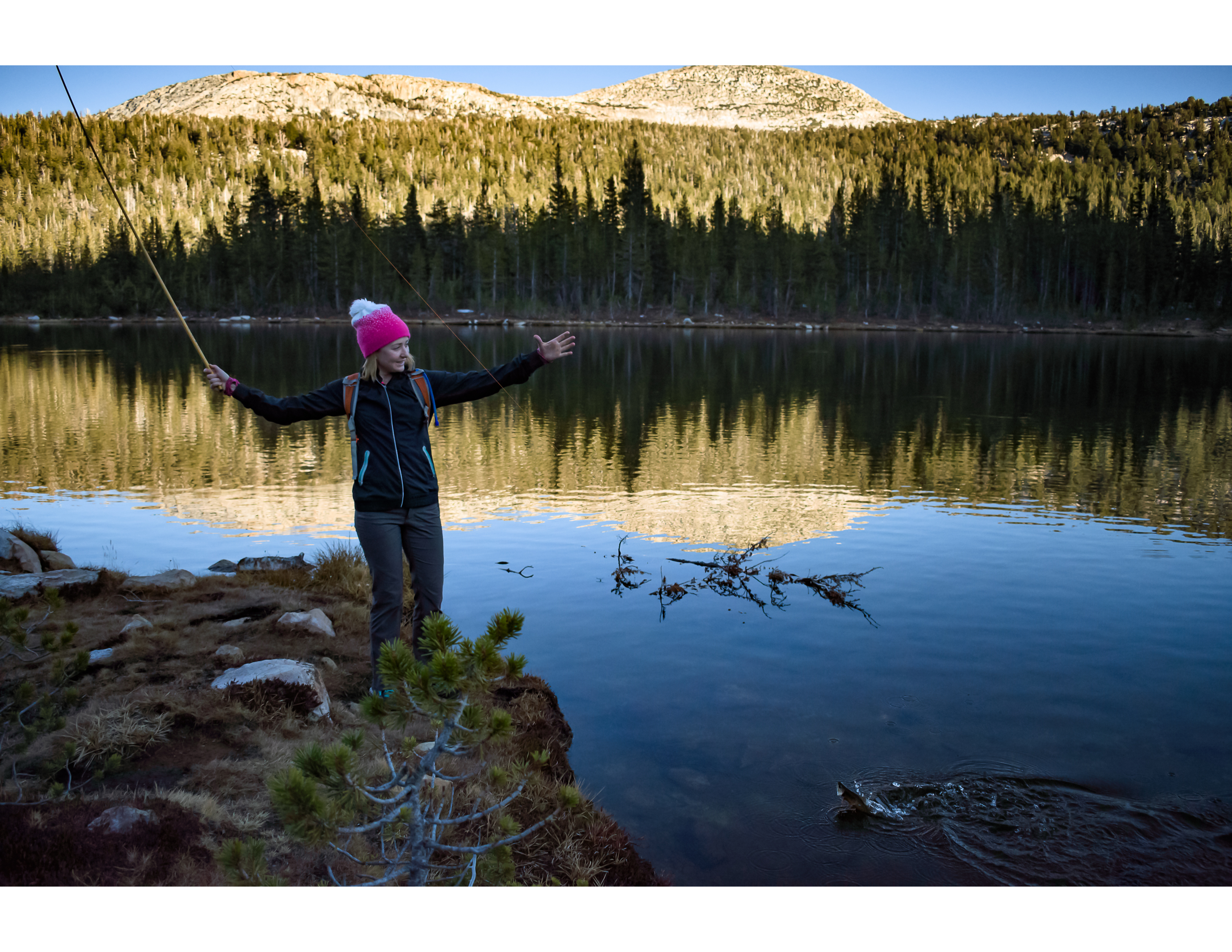
An angler pulls in a brook trout using a Tenkara fly rod in Yosemite National Park.

=== Record ===
The current world angling record brook trout was caught by Dr. W. J. Cook on the Nipigon River, Ontario, in July 1915. The 31 in (79 cm) trout weighed only 6.57 kg (14 lb 8 oz) because, at the time of weighing, it was badly decomposed after 21 days in the bush without refrigeration. A 29 in (74 cm) brook trout, caught in October 2006 in Manitoba, is not eligible for record status since it was released alive. This trout weighed about 15.98 lb (7.25 kg) based on the accepted formula for calculating weight by measurements, and it currently stands as the record brook trout for Manitoba.

== Artificial propagation and aquaculture ==
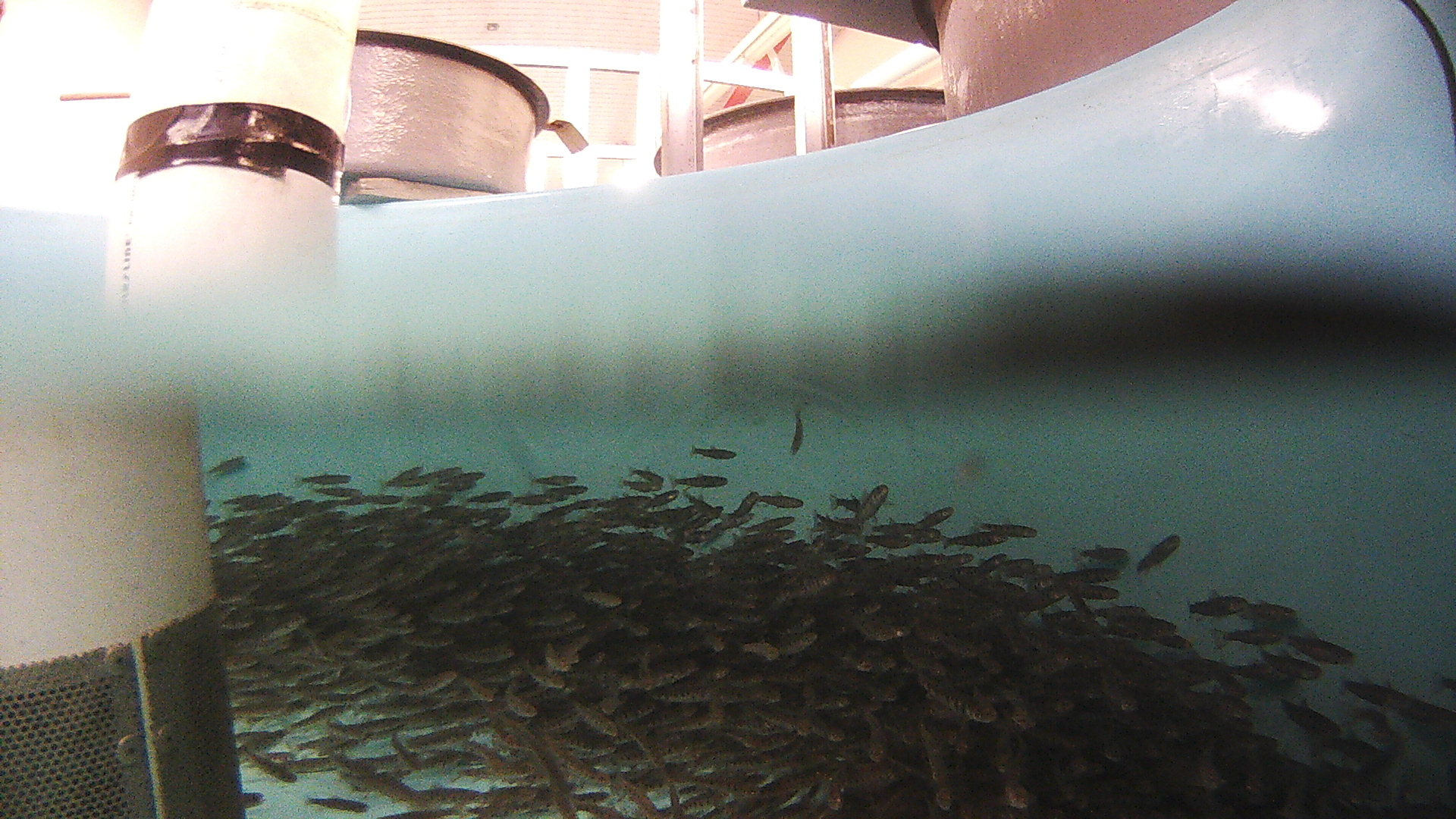
Juvenile brook trout grown in a rearing tank by the United States Fish and Wildlife Service.

Since the 1800s, brook trout populations have been grown by artificial propagation and aquaculture. Artificial propagation in fish is the process by which eggs are inseminated, hatched, and grown in a controlled environment that minimizes unfavorable environmental pressures. The fish are then released into the wild when they have reached the appropriate age and size. This process was introduced as a way to counteract the effects of overfishing and aquatic habitat loss and to reinforce brook trout populations across the Northeastern United States. Hatchery rearing was also introduced to raise brook trout in large numbers for food production and sale for human consumption.

In some hatchery programs, mature brook trout are collected from streams using backpack electrofishing, a standard fisheries technique that momentarily stuns fish with minimal harm. This allows biologists to safely capture spawning adults, gently express eggs and milt for fertilization, and return the adult fish to the wild. Both wild and domestic strains of brook trout show no reduction in gamete viability or offspring survival following electrofishing of the adults, supporting this method of collecting offspring for artificial propagation.

Within the hatchery, the process of artificial propagation in brook trout begins by decreasing the temperature of the adult trout's propagation tank to mimic the seasonal changes associated with brook trout spawning season. The acclimated trout are then collected, and the eggs are gently massaged out of the female trout into a collection vessel, and then inseminated with the milt of a male brook. Next, the inseminated eggs are strained of the milt and transferred to a jar for several weeks to develop into viable embryos. Once the eggs have begun to hatch, the fry are transported into rearing tanks where they will grow and develop before their release into the wild. Their rearing tanks typically consist of large circular tanks with a constant water flow going through them to allow a current to circulate through the tank and keep it clean (some more elaborate systems operate on a re-circulation system where the water is filtered and reused). The fish are typically fed a pelleted food consisting of 40–50% protein and 15% fat made from fish oil, animal protein, plant protein and vitamins and minerals. Finally, once the fish have reached a viable size, around 2 inches in length, they are released into the wild.

This means of brook trout aquaculture has sparked controversy due to potential decrease in the fishes fitness, adaptability, and environmental resilience, effectively posing a threat to native brook trout populations. Arguments against artificial propagation of brook trout claim that it can cause a degradation of the overall genetic pool due to the possibility of inbreeding among individuals. This lack of genetic variation could lead to certain populations of brook trout to become extirpated from their deficiency in adaptability.

== Conservation status ==
As early as the late 19th century, native brook trout in North America became extirpated from many watercourses as land development, forest clear-cutting, and industrialization took hold. Streams and creeks that were polluted, dammed, or silted up often became too warm to hold native brook trout, and were colonized by transplanted smallmouth bass and perch or other introduced salmonids such as brown and rainbow trout. The brown trout, a species not native to North America, has replaced the brook trout in much of the brook trout's native water. If already stressed by overharvesting or by temperature, brook trout populations are very susceptible to damage by the introduction of exogenous species. Many lacustrine populations of brook trout have been extirpated by the introduction of other species, particularly percids, but sometimes other spiny-rayed fishes.

In addition to chemical pollution and algae growth caused by runoff containing chemicals and fertilizers, air pollution has also been a significant factor in the disappearance of brook trout from their native habitats. In the U.S., acid rain caused by air pollution has resulted in pH levels too low to sustain brook trout in all but the highest headwaters of some Appalachian streams and creeks. Brook trout populations across large parts of eastern Canada have been similarly challenged; a subspecies known as the aurora trout was extirpated from the wild by the effects of acid rain.

Organizations such as Trout Unlimited and Trout Unlimited Canada are partnering with other organizations such as the Southern Appalachian Brook Trout Foundation, the Eastern Brook Trout Joint Venture, and state, provincial, and federal agencies to undertake projects that restore native brook trout habitat and populations.

=== As an invasive species ===
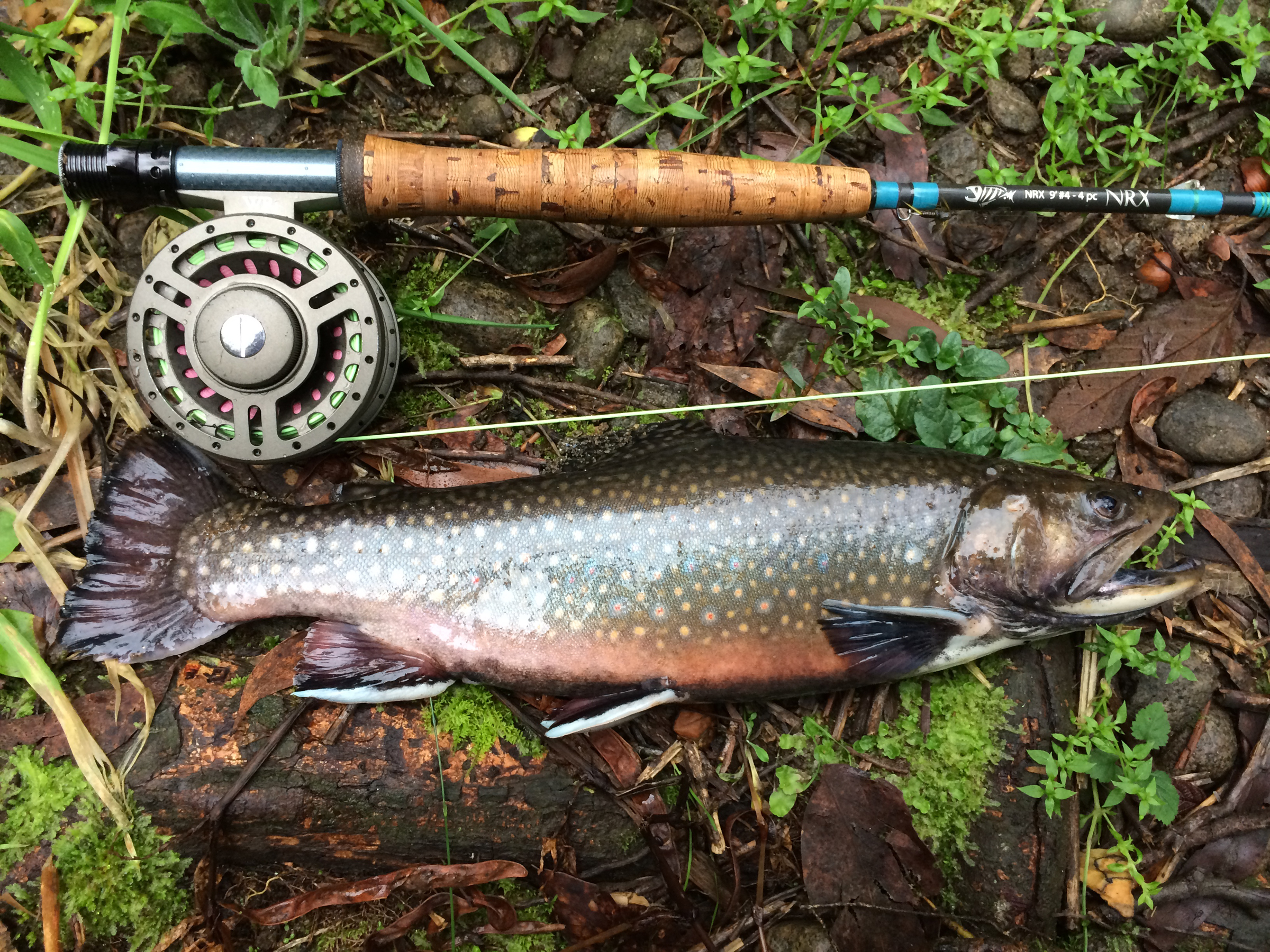
In Victoria, Australia

Although brook trout populations are under stress in their native range, they are considered an invasive species where they have been introduced outside their historic native range. In the northern Rocky Mountains, non-native brook trout are considered a significant contributor to the decline or extirpation of native cutthroat trout (Oncorhynchus clarki) in headwater streams. Invasive brook trout populations may provoke territorial competition with the native cutthroat trout that can impede the recovery efforts of cutthroat trout by environmental agencies. Non-native brook trout populations have been subject to eradication programs in efforts to preserve native species. In Yellowstone National Park, anglers may take an unlimited number of non-native brook trout in some watersheds. In the Lamar River watershed, a mandatory kill regulation for any brook trout caught is in effect. In Europe, introduced brook trout, once established, have had negative impacts on growth rates of native brown trout (S. trutta).
