= Christine Lake (Minnesota) =

Lake in the state of Minnesota, United States

- Location within Minnesota
- Location: Cook County, Minnesota
- Coordinates: 47°44′11″N 90°43′45″W
- Type: Lake
- Surface elevation: 1,568 feet (478 m)

Christine Lake is a lake in Cook County, Minnesota, in the United States.

Christine Lake was named for the daughter of the county school superintendent.

== See also ==
- List of lakes in Minnesota
