= Clear Stream =

- Location within New Hampshire Location within the United States

Location
- Country: United States
- State: New Hampshire
- County: Coos
- Towns & townships: Dixville, Millsfield, Errol

Physical characteristics
- Source: Juncture of Cascade Brook and Flume Brook
  - location: Dixville Notch
  - coordinates: 44°50′48″N 71°16′42″W
  - elevation: 1,430 ft (440 m)
- Mouth: Androscoggin River
  - location: Errol
  - coordinates: 44°46′39″N 71°8′9″W
  - elevation: 1,215 ft (370 m)
- Length: 11.8 mi (19.0 km)

Basin features
- Tributaries
  - left: Welch Brook, Corser Brook
  - right: West Branch Clear Stream, Millsfield Pond Brook

Clear Stream is an 11.8-mile-long (19.0 km) river in northern New Hampshire in the United States. It is a tributary of the Androscoggin River, which flows south and east into Maine, joining the Kennebec River near the Atlantic Ocean.

Clear Stream flows out of Dixville Notch, a dramatic gap through the mountains of northern New Hampshire. The stream is formed by the juncture of Cascade Brook and Flume Brook. The stream flows southeast through the townships of Dixville and Millsfield before joining the Androscoggin River in the town of Errol. New Hampshire Route 26 follows the stream for its entire length.

== See also ==
- List of rivers of New Hampshire
