= Upper Ammonoosuc River =

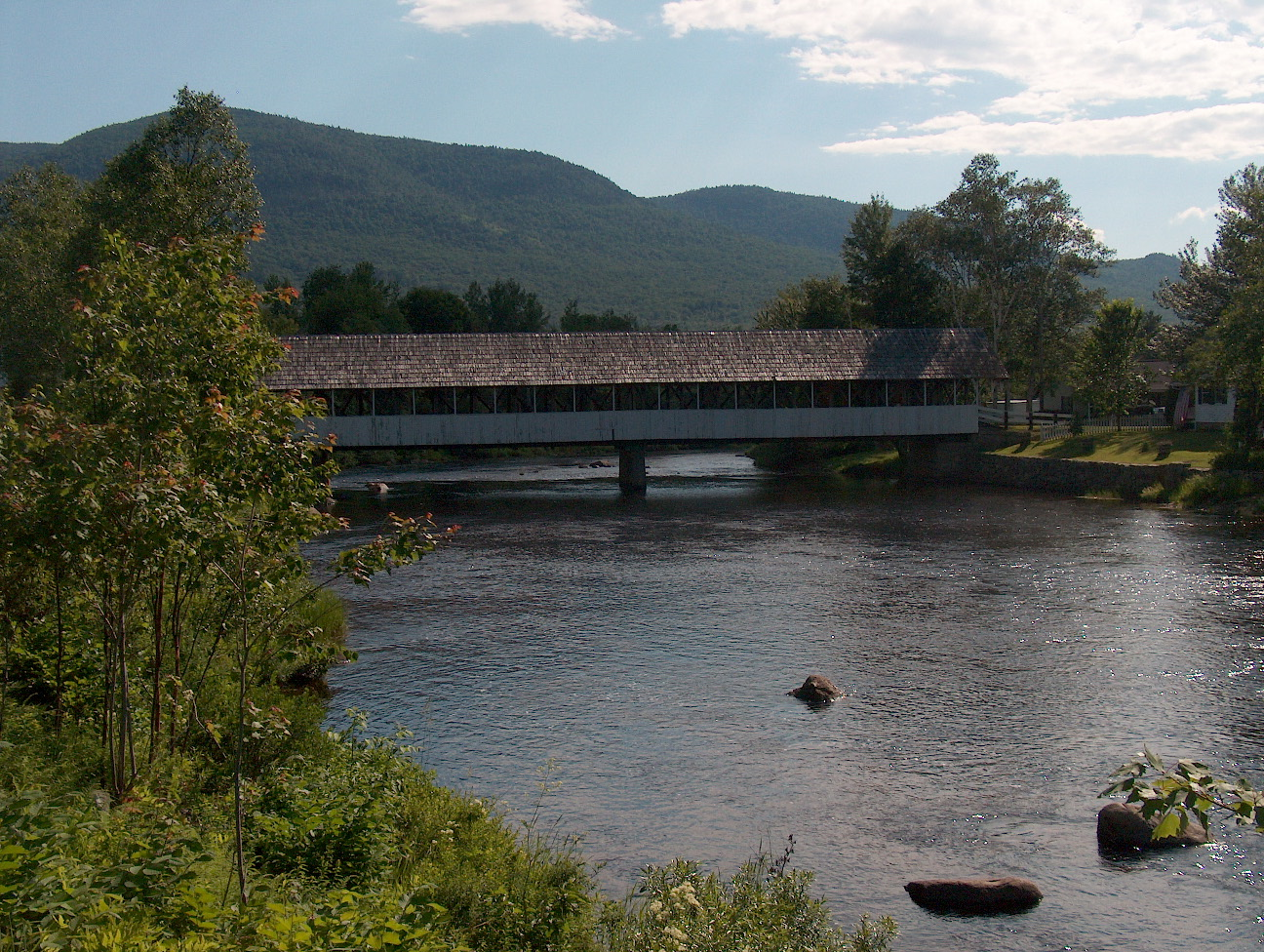
- The Upper Ammonoosuc at the covered bridge in Stark, New Hampshire

- Location within New Hampshire Location within the United States

Location
- Country: United States
- State: New Hampshire
- County: Coos
- Towns and city: Randolph, Berlin, Milan, Dummer, Stark, Northumberland

Physical characteristics
- Source: Pond of Safety
  - location: Randolph
  - coordinates: 44°24′31″N 71°20′22″W
  - elevation: 2,190 ft (667.5 m)
- Mouth: Connecticut River
  - location: Groveton
  - coordinates: 44°35′18″N 71°32′4″W
  - elevation: 845 ft (258 m)
- Length: 42.4 mi (68.2 km)

Basin features
- Tributaries
  - left: West Branch, Mill Brook, Roaring Brook
  - right: North Branch, Phillips Brook, Nash Stream, Potter Brook

The Upper Ammonoosuc River is a tributary of the Connecticut River that flows through Coös County in the northern part of the northeastern U.S. state of New Hampshire. Despite its name, the river is not an upstream portion of the Ammonoosuc River, but instead a separate tributary of the Connecticut River flowing from 20 to 60 miles (32 to 97 km) north of the Ammonoosuc.

The Upper Ammonoosuc rises in Pond of Safety in the town of Randolph, runs first generally north through rural portions of Berlin (where it flows through the Godfrey Dam), Milan and a corner of Dummer, then west through Stark and then Northumberland, where it drains into the Connecticut near the village of Groveton. The end points of that 42.4-mile (68.2 km) course are approximately 25 air miles (38 km) apart.

From Milan to Groveton it is fairly closely paralleled by New Hampshire Route 110.

Fort Wentworth was built in 1755 at the junction of the Upper Ammonoosuc and Connecticut rivers (now near the village of Groveton). The fort was used sporadically during the French and Indian War and the American Revolutionary War.

The watershed area includes the northern Crescent Range, eastern Pliny Range, and the eastern and northern Pilot Range, all in the White Mountains. Major tributaries of the Upper Ammonoosuc include:

- Nash Stream, rising in the township of Odell
- Phillips Brook, rising in Erving's Location
- the North Branch of the Upper Ammonoosuc, flowing roughly parallel to and east of the main stem (with a ridge between them that includes Hodgdon Hill and carries NH Rte. 110) in the town of Milan, to join it at West Milan
- the West Branch of the Upper Ammonoosuc, rising on the eastern slope of Mount Cabot in Kilkenny, draining Unknown Pond and York Pond, and joining the main stem below the Godfrey Dam.

== See also ==
- List of New Hampshire rivers
