= Stark, New Hampshire =

- Town
- Stark, New Hampshire, from the southwest

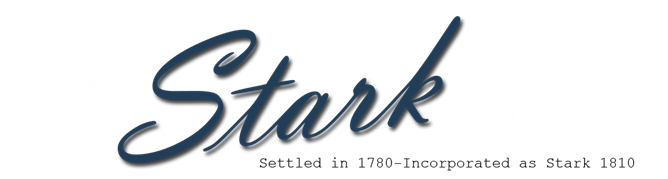
- Logo

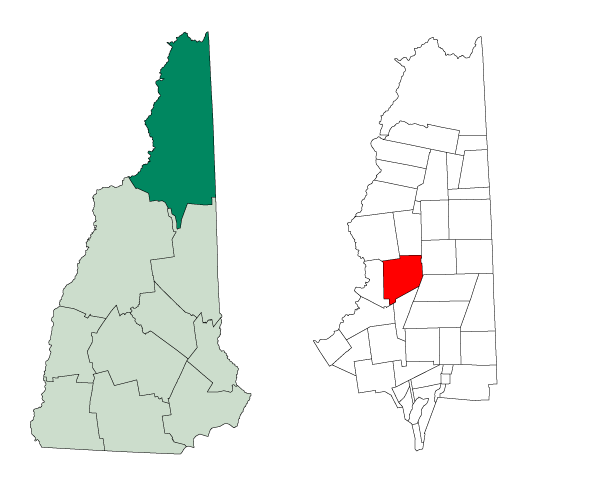
- Location in Coös County, New Hampshire
- Coordinates: 44°37′15″N 71°23′33″W
- Country: United States
- State: New Hampshire
- County: Coös
- Incorporated: 1795
- Villages: Stark; Crystal; Percy

Area
  - Total: 59.7 sq mi (154.7 km^{2})
  - Land: 58.8 sq mi (152.3 km^{2})
  - Water: 0.93 sq mi (2.4 km^{2}) 1.53%
- Elevation: 1,178 ft (359 m)

Population (2020)
  - Total: 478
  - Density: 8.0/sq mi (3.1/km^{2})
- Time zone: UTC-5 (Eastern)
  - Summer (DST): UTC-4 (Eastern)
- ZIP code: 03582
- Area code: 603
- FIPS code: 33-73060
- GNIS feature ID: 873724
- Website: starknh.gov

Stark is a town in Coös County, New Hampshire, United States. The population was 478 at the 2020 census, a decline from the figure of 556 tabulated in 2010. The town includes the villages of Percy and Crystal as well as the village of Stark, located on the Upper Ammonoosuc River. New Hampshire Route 110 runs through Stark, east from U.S. Highway 3 in Groveton and northwest from Route 16 in Berlin. Much of the town is within the boundaries of the White Mountain National Forest.

Stark is part of the Berlin, NH-VT Micropolitan Statistical Area.

== History ==
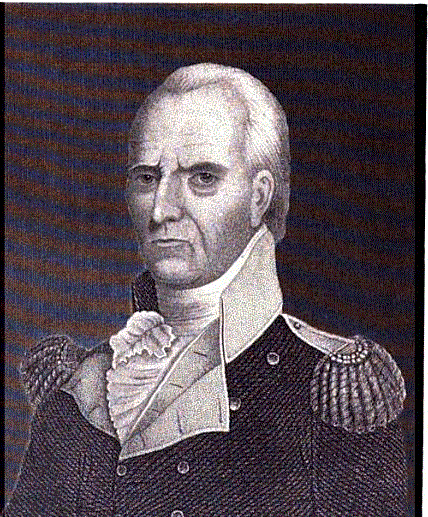
General John Stark

Granted in 1774, Stark was originally named "Percy", after Hugh Percy, 1st Duke of Northumberland. The town was incorporated in 1795, and renamed "Stark" in 1832, after General John Stark, who wrote the words that became New Hampshire's motto, "Live Free or Die".

=== World War II POW camp ===
In early 1944, the remains of a former Civilian Conservation Corps camp in the town were converted to form Camp Stark, which held about 250 German POWs. This was the only World War II POW camp located in New Hampshire. Most of the men in the camp performed hard labor in the nearby forests, supplying wood for the paper mills in Berlin, New Hampshire. Some of the men eventually came back to live in the United States and Canada after the war ended, and the camp was closed in 1946.

== Geography ==
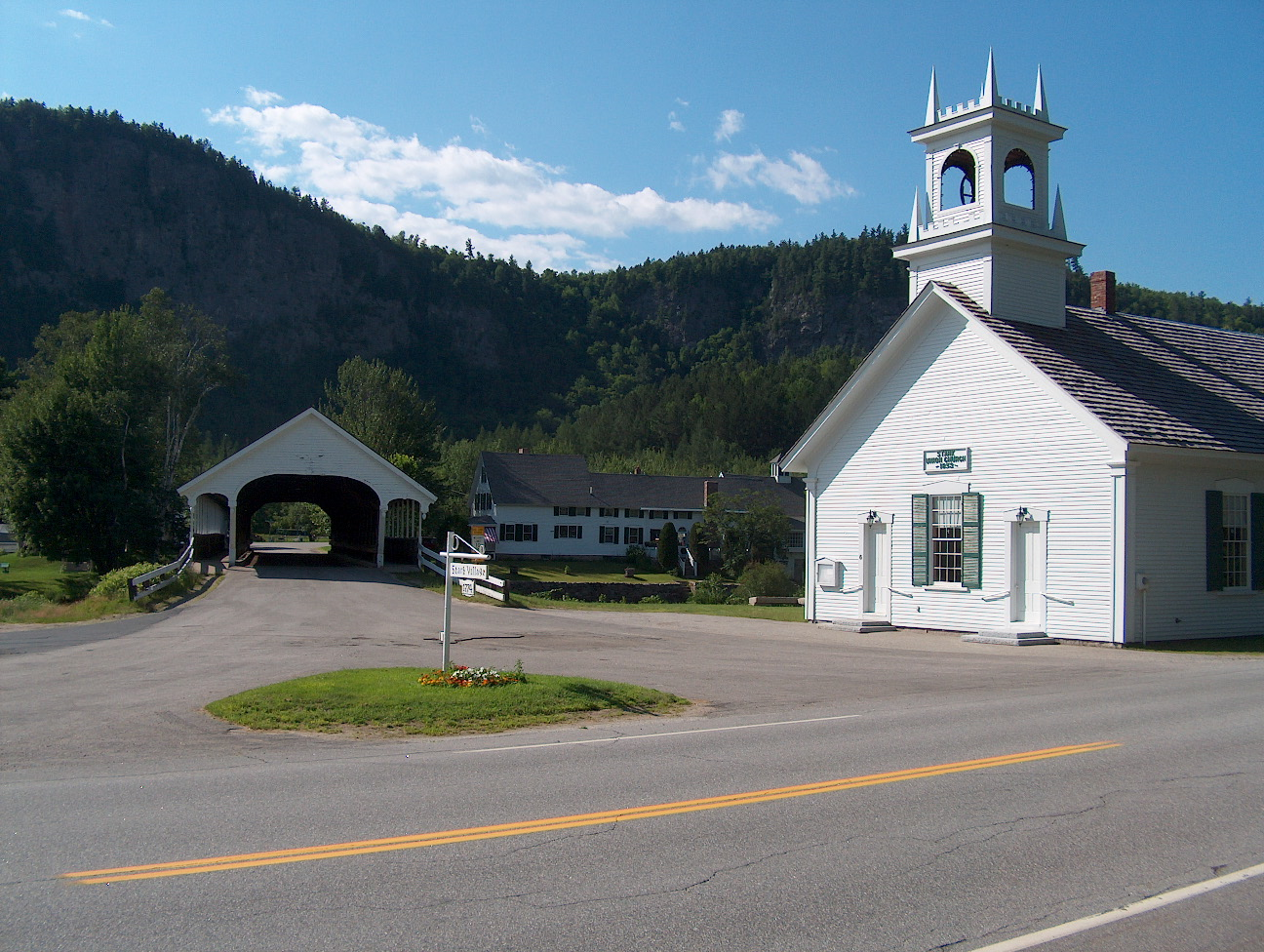
Stark Union Church at the Stark Covered Bridge

According to the United States Census Bureau, the town has a total area of 59.7 square miles (154.7 km^{2}), of which 58.8 square miles (152.3 km^{2}) are land and 0.93 square miles (2.4 km^{2}) are water, comprising 1.53% of the town. The town includes the eastern edge of the Pilot Range in the White Mountains, including several peaks higher than 3,000 feet (910 m) above sea level. The highest point in Stark is 3,730-foot (1,140 m) Mount Hutchins, on the border with Northumberland.

=== Adjacent municipalities ===
- Odell (north)
- Dummer (east)
- Milan (southeast)
- Kilkenny (south)
- Lancaster (south)
- Northumberland (west)
- Stratford (northwest)

== Demographics ==
Historical population
| Census | Pop. | Note | %± |
|---|---|---|---|
| 1840 | 349 | | — |
| 1850 | 418 | | 19.8% |
| 1860 | 426 | | 1.9% |
| 1870 | 464 | | 8.9% |
| 1880 | 690 | | 48.7% |
| 1890 | 703 | | 1.9% |
| 1900 | 733 | | 4.3% |
| 1910 | 448 | | −38.9% |
| 1920 | 339 | | −24.3% |
| 1930 | 329 | | −2.9% |
| 1940 | 352 | | 7.0% |
| 1950 | 373 | | 6.0% |
| 1960 | 327 | | −12.3% |
| 1970 | 343 | | 4.9% |
| 1980 | 470 | | 37.0% |
| 1990 | 518 | | 10.2% |
| 2000 | 516 | | −0.4% |
| 2010 | 556 | | 7.8% |
| 2020 | 478 | | −14.0% |
U.S. Decennial Census

Racial composition as of 2020 (NH = Non-Hispanic)
| Race / Ethnicity | Pop 2020 | % 2020 |
|---|---|---|
| White alone (NH) | 445 | 93.09% |
| Black or African American alone (NH) | 0 | 0.00% |
| Native American or Alaska Native alone (NH) | 1 | 0.21% |
| Asian alone (NH) | 1 | 0.21% |
| Pacific Islander alone (NH) | 0 | 0.00% |
| Some Other Race alone (NH) | 2 | 0.42% |
| Mixed Race/Multi-Racial (NH) | 21 | 4.39% |
| Hispanic or Latino (any race) | 8 | 1.67% |
| Total | 478 | 100.00% |

Note: the US Census treats Hispanic/Latino as an ethnic category. This table excludes Latinos from the racial categories and assigns them to a separate category. Hispanics/Latinos can be of any race.

As of the census of 2000, there were 516 people, 194 households, and 147 families residing in the town. The population density was 8.7 people per square mile (3.4/km^{2}). There were 384 housing units at an average density of 6.5 per square mile (2.5/km^{2}). The racial makeup of the town was 97.48% White, 1.36% Asian, 0.19% from other races, and 0.97% from two or more races. Hispanic or Latino of any race were 0.39% of the population.

There were 194 households, out of which 33.0% had children under the age of 18 living with them, 61.3% were married couples living together, 6.7% had a female householder with no husband present, and 24.2% were non-families. 17.5% of all households were made up of individuals, and 7.7% had someone living alone who was 65 years of age or older. The average household size was 2.65 and the average family size was 2.99.

In the town, the population was spread out, with 26.6% under the age of 18, 5.8% from 18 to 24, 28.5% from 25 to 44, 26.2% from 45 to 64, and 13.0% who were 65 years of age or older. The median age was 40 years. For every 100 females, there were 99.2 males. For every 100 females age 18 and over, there were 100.5 males.

The median income for a household in the town was $37,946, and the median income for a family was $40,089. Males had a median income of $35,833 versus $24,750 for females. The per capita income for the town was $17,168. About 2.5% of families and 5.1% of the population were below the poverty line, including none of those under age 18 and 6.2% of those age 65 or over.
