= Diamond River =

Diamond River may refer to:

- Diamond Brook
- Geum River

== See also ==
Not to be confused with

- Little Diamond Brook
- Swift Diamond River
- Dead Diamond River
- East Branch Dead Diamond River
- Middle Branch Dead Diamond River
- West Branch Dead Diamond River
- Little Dead Diamond River
- West Branch Little Dead Diamond River
- South Branch Little Dead Diamond River
