= South Branch Little Dead Diamond River =

- Location within New Hampshire Location within the United States

Location
- Country: United States
- State: New Hampshire
- County: Coos
- Townships: Dix's Grant, Clarksville, Atkinson & Gilmanton Grant, Second College Grant

Physical characteristics
- Source: Crystal Mountain
  - location: Dix's Grant
  - coordinates: 44°57′4″N 71°12′26″W
  - elevation: 2,760 ft (840 m)
- Mouth: Little Dead Diamond River
  - location: Second College Grant
  - coordinates: 44°57′57″N 71°8′31″W
  - elevation: 1,560 ft (480 m)
- Length: 4.3 mi (6.9 km)

Basin features
- Tributaries
  - right: Lost Valley Brook

The South Branch of the Little Dead Diamond River is a 4.3-mile-long (6.9 km) river in northern New Hampshire in the United States. It is a tributary of the Little Dead Diamond River, located in the Androscoggin River watershed of Maine and New Hampshire.

The river rises in the township of Dix's Grant on the eastern slopes of Crystal Mountain, a 7-mile-long (11 km) ridge. The river flows northeast into the Atkinson and Gilmanton Academy Grant, then joins the Little Dead Diamond in the Dartmouth College Grant.

== See also ==
- List of rivers of New Hampshire
