= Middle Branch Dead Diamond River =

- Location within New Hampshire Location within the United States

Location
- Country: United States
- State: New Hampshire
- County: Coos
- Towns: Pittsburg, Atkinson & Gilmanton Grant

Physical characteristics
- Source
  - location: Pittsburg
  - coordinates: 45°5′29″N 71°10′12″W
  - elevation: 2,220 ft (680 m)
- Mouth: West Branch Dead Diamond River
  - location: Atkinson & Gilmanton Grant
  - coordinates: 45°0′14″N 71°9′1″W
  - elevation: 1,538 ft (469 m)
- Length: 9.0 mi (14.5 km)

The Middle Branch of the Dead Diamond River is a 9.0-mile-long (14.5 km) river in northern New Hampshire in the United States. It is a tributary of the West Branch of the Dead Diamond River, located in the Androscoggin River watershed of Maine and New Hampshire.

The Middle Branch flows for most of its length through Pittsburg, the northernmost town in New Hampshire. It flows southeast through a wide valley between 3,383-foot (1,031 m) Magalloway Mountain to the south and 3,230-foot (980 m) Diamond Ridge to the north. The river then turns south and flows parallel to the East Branch of the Dead Diamond, entering Atkinson and Gilmanton Grant and joining the West Branch less than one mile upstream from the confluence of the West Branch and the East Branch.

== See also ==
- List of rivers of New Hampshire
