= Little Dead Diamond River =

- Location within New Hampshire Location within the United States

Location
- Country: United States
- State: New Hampshire
- County: Coos
- Towns: Clarksville; Atkinson & Gilmanton Grant; Second College Grant

Physical characteristics
- Source: Crystal Mountain
  - location: Clarksville
  - coordinates: 44°59′12″N 71°13′55″W
  - elevation: 2,800 ft (850 m)
- Mouth: Dead Diamond River
  - location: Atkinson & Gilmanton Grant
  - coordinates: 44°58′29″N 71°7′22″W
  - elevation: 1,390 ft (420 m)
- Length: 7.1 mi (11.4 km)

Basin features
- Tributaries
  - left: Pesky Brook
  - right: West Branch, South Branch

The Little Dead Diamond River is a 7.1-mile-long (11.4 km) river in northern New Hampshire in the United States. It is a tributary of the Dead Diamond River, located in the Androscoggin River watershed of Maine and New Hampshire.

The Little Dead Diamond River rises in the town of Clarksville near the north end of Crystal Mountain, a 7-mile-long (11 km) ridge with elevations ranging from 2,400 to 3,300 feet (730 to 1,010 m) above sea level. 3,081-foot (939 m) Mount Pisgah lies just to the north of the headwaters. The river flows east into the Atkinson and Gilmanton Academy Grant, where it is joined by its west branch. The river then enters the Dartmouth College Grant and is joined by its south branch. The Little Dead Diamond then turns north, reenters the Atkinson and Gilmanton Grant, and joins the Dead Diamond River near the rapids and old logging camp known as Hell Gate.

== See also ==
- List of rivers of New Hampshire
