= West Branch Dead Diamond River =

- Location within New Hampshire Location within the United States

Location
- Country: United States
- State: New Hampshire
- County: Coos
- Town and township: Pittsburg, Atkinson & Gilmanton Grant

Physical characteristics
- Source: Confluence of Roby Brook and Rowell Brook
  - location: Pittsburg
  - coordinates: 45°0′59″N 71°10′18″W
  - elevation: 1,460 ft (450 m)
- Mouth: Dead Diamond River
  - location: Atkinson & Gilmanton Grant
  - coordinates: 45°0′9″N 71°8′55″W
  - elevation: 1,438 ft (438 m)
- Length: 2.7 mi (4.3 km)

Basin features
- Tributaries
  - left: Middle Branch Dead Diamond River
  - right: Cascade Brook

The West Branch of the Dead Diamond River is a 2.7-mile-long (4.3 km) river in northern New Hampshire in the United States. It is a tributary of the Dead Diamond River, located in the Androscoggin River watershed of Maine and New Hampshire.

The West Branch of the Dead Diamond River rises in a southern corner of the town of Pittsburg, New Hampshire, at the juncture of Rowell and Roby brooks. Flowing southeast, it passes into the township of Atkinson and Gilmanton Academy Grant, where it joins the East Branch to form the Dead Diamond River. The Middle Branch of the Dead Diamond joins the West Branch shortly before the West and East branches join.

== See also ==
- List of rivers of New Hampshire
