= West Branch Little Dead Diamond River =

- Location within New Hampshire Location within the United States

Location
- Country: United States
- State: New Hampshire
- County: Coos
- Townships: Clarksville; Atkinson & Gilmanton Grant

Physical characteristics
- Source: Crystal Mountain
  - location: Clarksville
  - coordinates: 44°58′3″N 71°13′8″W
  - elevation: 2,550 ft (780 m)
- Mouth: Little Dead Diamond River
  - location: Atkinson & Gilmanton Grant
  - coordinates: 44°58′52″N 71°10′40″W
  - elevation: 1,790 ft (550 m)
- Length: 2.5 mi (4.0 km)

The West Branch of the Little Dead Diamond River is a 2.5-mile-long (4.0 km) river in northern New Hampshire in the United States. It is a tributary of the Little Dead Diamond River, located in the Androscoggin River watershed of Maine and New Hampshire.

The river rises in the town of Clarksville on the eastern slopes of Crystal Mountain, a 7-mile-long (11 km) ridge. The river, never larger than a brook, flows northeast into the Atkinson and Gilmanton Academy Grant, where it joins the Little Dead Diamond River.

== See also ==
- List of rivers of New Hampshire
