= West Branch Little Magalloway River =

- Location within Maine Location within New Hampshire Location within the United States

Location
- Country: United States
- States: New Hampshire, Maine
- Counties: Coos, NH; Oxford, ME
- Townships: Pittsburg, NH; North Oxford, ME

Physical characteristics
- Source: Stub Hill
  - location: Pittsburg, NH
  - coordinates: 45°7′48″N 71°5′31″W
  - elevation: 2,380 ft (730 m)
- Mouth: Middle Branch Little Magalloway River
  - location: North Oxford, ME
  - coordinates: 45°7′57″N 71°1′47″W
  - elevation: 1,620 ft (490 m)
- Length: 5.3 mi (8.5 km)

The West Branch of the Little Magalloway River is a 5.3-mile-long (8.5 km) river in northern New Hampshire and northwestern Maine in the United States. It is a tributary of the Middle Branch Little Magalloway River, located in the Androscoggin River watershed of Maine and New Hampshire.

The West Branch rises in Pittsburg, New Hampshire, north of 3,627-foot (1,106 m) Stub Hill, the highest point in Pittsburg. The brook-sized river drops to the east into Maine, descending another 700 feet before joining the Middle Branch of the Little Magalloway a short distance upstream from Aziscohos Lake.

== See also ==
- List of rivers of Maine
- List of rivers of New Hampshire
