= Middle Branch Little Magalloway River =

- Location within Maine Location within New Hampshire Location within the United States

Location
- Country: United States
- States: New Hampshire, Maine
- Counties: Coos, NH, Oxford, ME
- Townships: Pittsburg, NH, North Oxford, ME

Physical characteristics
- Source
  - location: Pittsburg, NH
  - coordinates: 45°8′24″N 71°6′9″W
  - elevation: 2,580 ft (790 m)
- Mouth: Little Magalloway River
  - location: North Oxford, ME
  - coordinates: 45°7′39″N 71°1′8″W
  - elevation: 1,530 ft (470 m)
- Length: 4.6 mi (7.4 km)

Basin features
- Tributaries
  - right: West Branch

The Middle Branch of the Little Magalloway River is a 4.6-mile-long (7.4 km) river in northern New Hampshire and northwestern Maine in the United States. It is a tributary of the Little Magalloway River, located in the Androscoggin River watershed of Maine and New Hampshire.

The river rises in Pittsburg, New Hampshire, south of 2,714-foot (827 m) Prospect Mountain, and flows east into Maine. The West Branch of the Little Magalloway joins the Middle Branch 0.7 miles (1.1 km) upstream of the Middle Branch's juncture with the Little Magalloway, itself only 0.3 miles (0.5 km) above that river's end at Aziscohos Lake.

== See also ==
- List of rivers of New Hampshire
- List of rivers of Maine
