= Swift Diamond River =

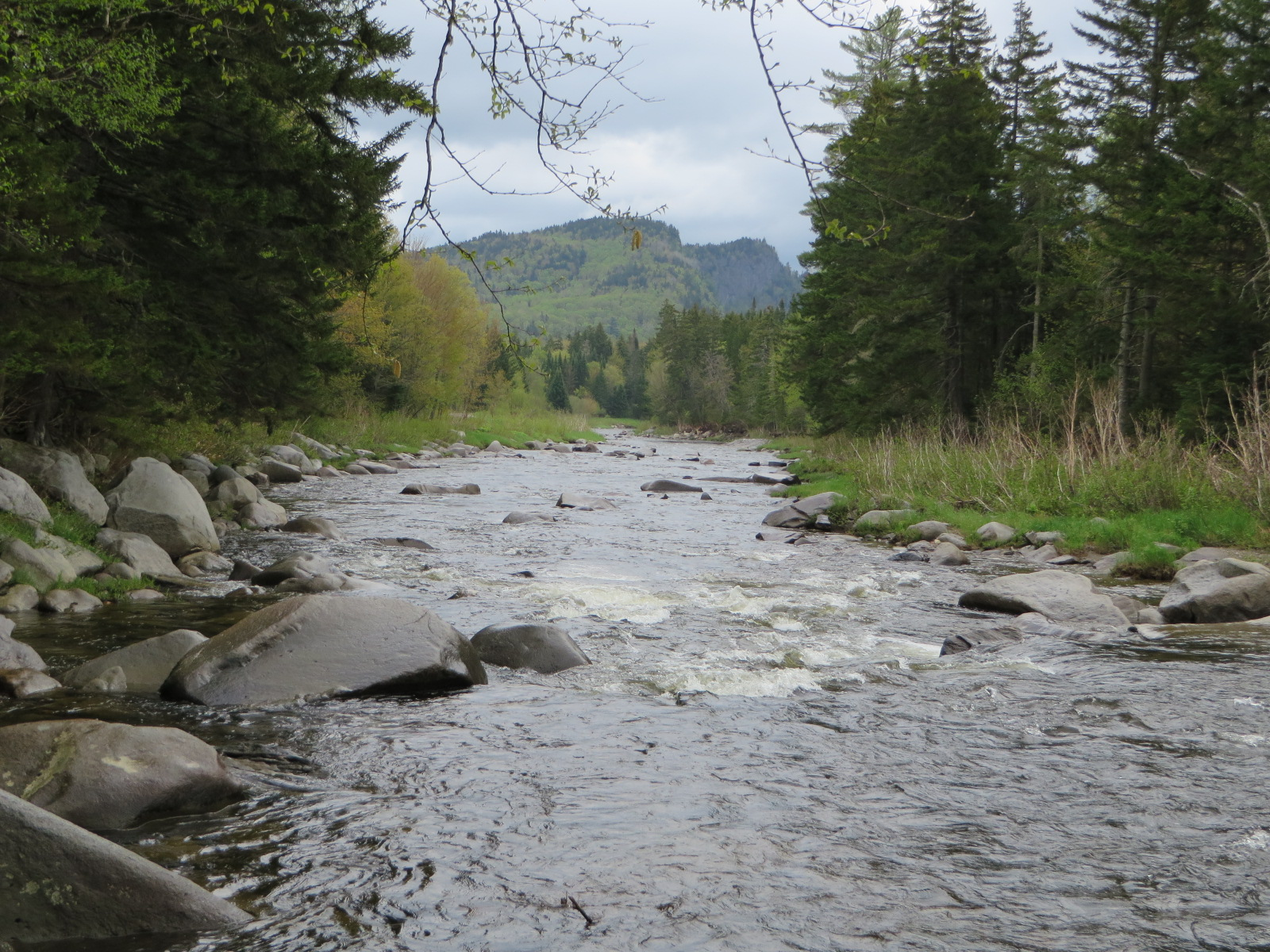
- The Swift Diamond River approaching the Diamond Peaks

- Location within New Hampshire Location within the United States

Location
- Country: United States
- State: New Hampshire
- County: Coos
- Townships: Stewartstown, Dixville, Dix's Grant, Second College Grant

Physical characteristics
- Source: Dead Water Ridge
  - location: Coleman State Park
  - coordinates: 44°57′6″N 71°20′1″W
  - elevation: 2,365 ft (721 m)
- Mouth: Dead Diamond River
  - location: Second College Grant
  - coordinates: 44°52′55″N 71°4′15″W
  - elevation: 1,335 ft (407 m)
- Length: 17.8 mi (28.6 km)

Basin features
- Tributaries
  - left: Alder Brook, Roaring Brook, Fourmile Brook
  - right: Nathan Pond Brook, Dixie Brook

The Swift Diamond River is a 17.8-mile-long (28.6 km) river in northern New Hampshire in the United States. It is a tributary of the Dead Diamond River, located in the Androscoggin River watershed.

The Swift Diamond River rises in the town of Stewartstown, New Hampshire, atop Dead Water Ridge within Coleman State Park. The stream flows east into Little Diamond Pond, and then Diamond Pond. The river continues southeast and then east through mountainous and heavily forested terrain, where the chief land use is logging. The river passes through the townships of Dixville and Dix's Grant before joining the Dead Diamond River in the Dartmouth College Grant.

== See also ==
- List of rivers of New Hampshire
