= Dixville Notch State Park =

State park in Coös County, New Hampshire

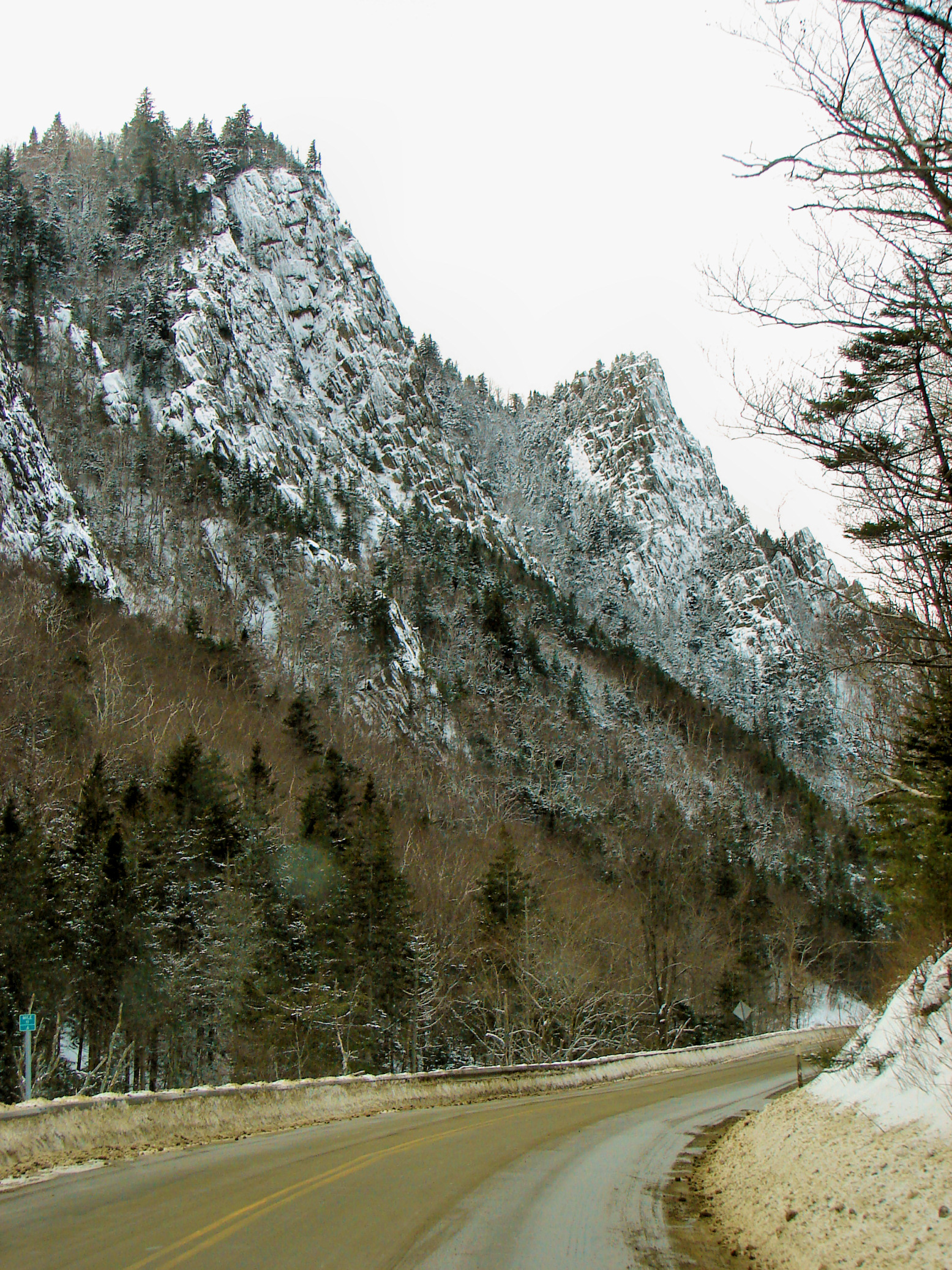

- Location within New Hampshire Location within the United States
- Interactive map of Dixville Notch State Park
- Location: Dixville, New Hampshire, United States
- Nearest city: Berlin, New Hampshire
- Coordinates: 44°51′50″N 71°17′38″W
- Area: 127 acres (51 ha)
- Elevation: 1,880 feet (570 m)
- Established: 1937
- Administrator: New Hampshire Division of Parks and Recreation
- Open: Year-round
- Camp sites: 0
- Website: Official website
- New Hampshire State Parks

Dixville Notch State Park is a park in northern New Hampshire, United States. The park encompasses 127 acres (51 ha) in Dixville Township where New Hampshire State Route 26 passes through Dixville Notch (New England's terminology for mountain gap or pass).

Within the park there are a scenic gorge, waterfalls on two mountain brooks, and hiking trails that lead to the summits of nearby mountains. While the park is accessible year-round, it is unstaffed and no visitor services are available.

Dixville Notch itself is characterized by a short steep-walled gorge that separates Dixville Peak and Cave Mountain, and also forms the boundary between the Connecticut River and Androscoggin River watersheds. Its beauty was already recognized in 1866, when innkeeper George Parsons established the Dix House, a travelers' guesthouse just on the west side of the notch on the shores of Lake Gloriette. Three decades later, the site was bought by Henry Hale who built The Balsams Grand Resort Hotel there.

Directly west is the Balsams Wilderness Ski Area, and about 3.5 miles (5.6 km) north is Coleman State Park.

== Climate ==
Climate data for Dixville Peak 44.8358 N, 71.3173 W, Elevation: 3,343 ft (1,019 m) (1991–2020 normals)
Month	Jan	Feb	Mar	Apr	May	Jun	Jul	Aug	Sep	Oct	Nov	Dec	Year
Mean daily maximum °F (°C)	19.0 (−7.2)	21.1 (−6.1)	29.4 (−1.4)	43.8 (6.6)	56.7 (13.7)	65.5 (18.6)	69.9 (21.1)	68.8 (20.4)	62.2 (16.8)	49.1 (9.5)	35.1 (1.7)	25.1 (−3.8)	45.5 (7.5)
Daily mean °F (°C)	9.6 (−12.4)	11.3 (−11.5)	19.7 (−6.8)	34.2 (1.2)	45.8 (7.7)	54.9 (12.7)	59.3 (15.2)	58.1 (14.5)	51.5 (10.8)	39.9 (4.4)	27.9 (−2.3)	17.1 (−8.3)	35.8 (2.1)
Mean daily minimum °F (°C)	0.3 (−17.6)	1.4 (−17.0)	9.9 (−12.3)	24.7 (−4.1)	34.9 (1.6)	44.3 (6.8)	48.7 (9.3)	47.4 (8.6)	40.9 (4.9)	30.6 (−0.8)	20.8 (−6.2)	9.2 (−12.7)	26.1 (−3.3)
Average precipitation inches (mm)	4.18 (106)	3.60 (91)	4.08 (104)	4.40 (112)	4.84 (123)	5.54 (141)	5.37 (136)	5.18 (132)	4.41 (112)	5.52 (140)	4.45 (113)	4.72 (120)	56.29 (1,430)
Source: PRISM Climate Group
