= West Branch Magalloway River =

- Location within Maine Location within New Hampshire Location within the United States

Location
- Country: United States
- States: New Hampshire; Maine
- Counties: Coos, NH; Oxford, ME
- Townships: Pittsburg, NH; North Oxford, ME

Physical characteristics
- Source: Boundary Pond
  - location: Pittsburg, NH
  - coordinates: 45°17′1″N 71°6′8″W
  - elevation: 238 ft (73 m)
- Mouth: Magalloway River
  - location: North Oxford, ME
  - coordinates: 45°14′40″N 71°0′4″W
  - elevation: 1,710 ft (520 m)
- Length: 9.3 mi (15.0 km)

Basin features
- Tributaries
  - left: Third East Branch Magalloway River
  - right: Moose Bog Brook

The West Branch of the Magalloway River is a 9.3-mile-long (15.0 km) river in northernmost New Hampshire and northwestern Maine in the United States. It is a tributary of the Magalloway River, located in the Androscoggin River watershed of Maine and New Hampshire.

The river rises in the northeastern corner of Pittsburg, New Hampshire, at the outlet of Boundary Pond, whose western end just touches the Canada–United States border. The river flows in a curving route to the east, entering Maine after two miles. The river passes through a wide, wet valley known as Moose Bog, then joins the Second East Branch of the Magalloway River. The juncture of the West Branch and the Second East Branch forms the beginning of the Magalloway.

== See also ==
- List of rivers of Maine
- List of rivers of New Hampshire
