= Little Magalloway River =

- Location within Maine Location within New Hampshire Location within the United States

Location
- Country: United States
- States: New Hampshire, Maine
- Counties: Coos, NH, Oxford, ME
- Townships: Pittsburg, NH; North Oxford, ME

Physical characteristics
- Source: Rump Mountain
  - location: Pittsburg, NH
  - coordinates: 45°11′57″N 71°4′50″W
  - elevation: 2,700 ft (820 m)
- Mouth: Magalloway River/Aziscohos Lake
  - location: North Oxford, ME
  - coordinates: 45°5′56″N 70°59′45″W
  - elevation: 1,517 ft (462 m)
- Length: 7.0 mi (11.3 km)

Basin features
- Tributaries
  - right: Trestle Brook, Middle Branch Little Magalloway River

The Little Magalloway River is a 7.0-mile-long (11.3 km) river in northwestern Maine and northern New Hampshire in the United States. It is a tributary of the Magalloway River, located in the Androscoggin River watershed of Maine and New Hampshire.

The river rises in New Hampshire, just west of the state line, on the southern slopes of 3,654-foot-high (1,114 m) Rump Mountain. The river flows southeast, quickly entering the state of Maine, where it ends at Aziscohos Lake on the Magalloway River. The entire watershed is forested and subject to logging.

== See also ==
- List of rivers of New Hampshire
- List of rivers of Maine
