= Second College Grant, New Hampshire =

Township in Coos County, New Hampshire, United States

- Township
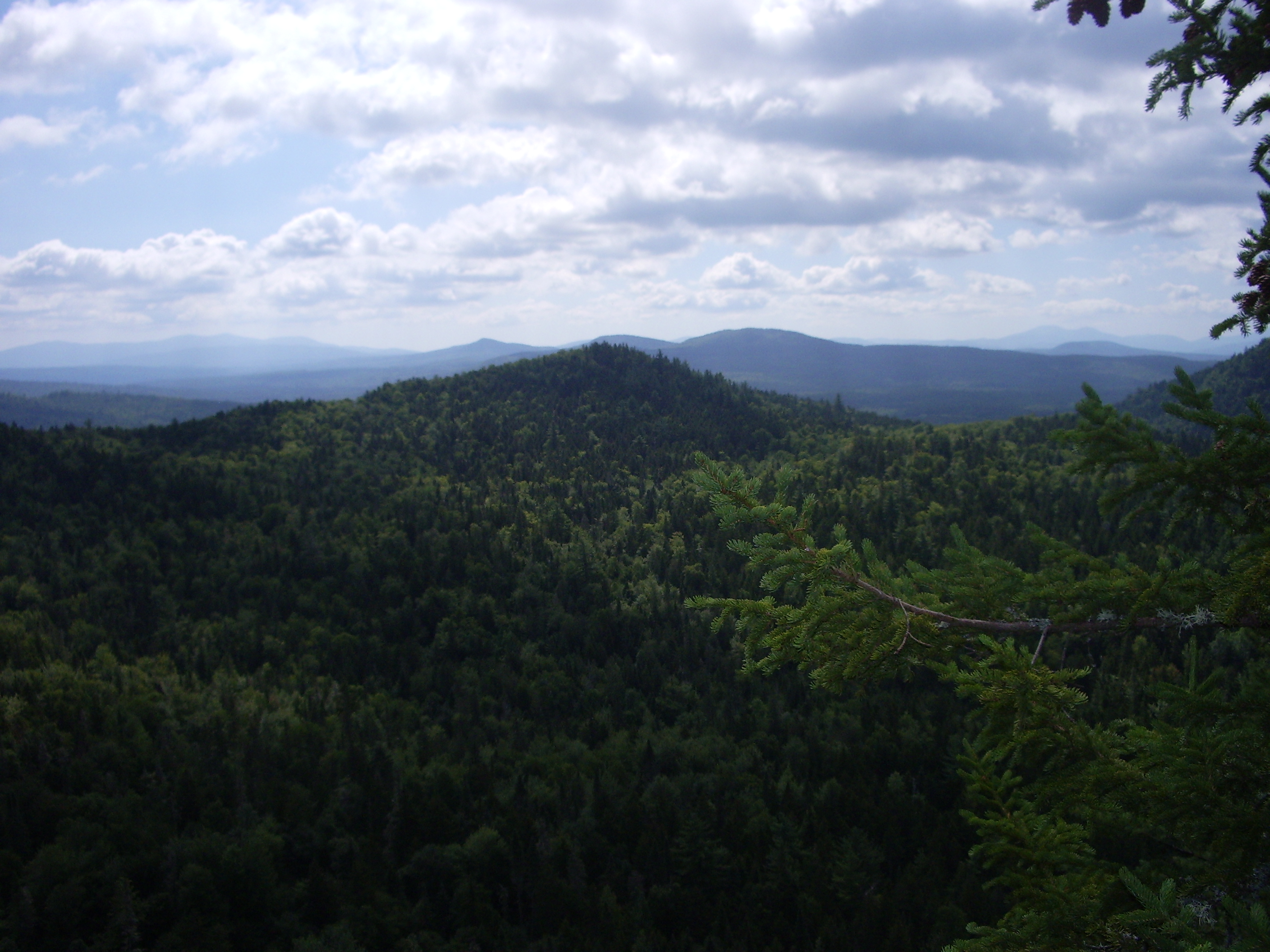
- A view of Second College Grant from the Diamond Peaks Trail

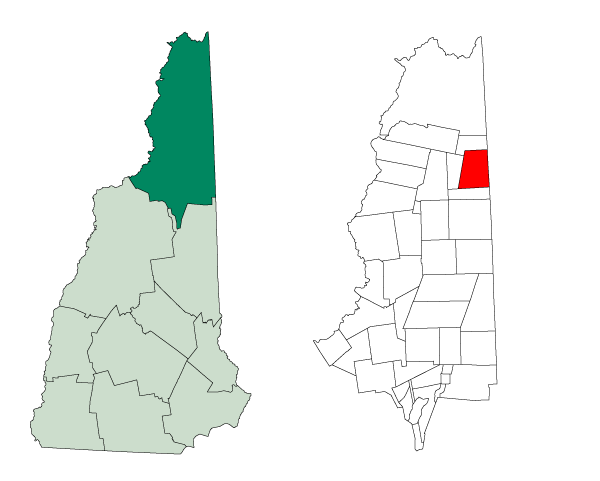
- Location in Coös County, New Hampshire
- Coordinates: 44°54′50″N 71°6′19″W
- Country: United States
- State: New Hampshire
- County: Coös

Area
  - Total: 41.9 sq mi (108.4 km^{2})
  - Land: 41.4 sq mi (107.1 km^{2})
  - Water: 0.50 sq mi (1.3 km^{2}) 1.21%
- Elevation: 1,820 ft (550 m)

Population (2020)
  - Total: 1
- Time zone: UTC-5 (Eastern)
  - Summer (DST): UTC-4 (Eastern)
- Area code: 603
- FIPS code: 33-007-68500
- GNIS feature ID: 871136

Second College Grant (also known as the Dartmouth College Grant) is a township in Coös County, New Hampshire, United States. The area of this township is owned and controlled by Dartmouth College. As of the 2020 census, the grant had a population of one.

In New Hampshire, locations, grants, purchases, and townships (which are different from towns) are unincorporated portions of a county which are not part of any town and have limited self-government (if any, as many are uninhabited).

Trails and cabins are available for use by the Dartmouth community, and are maintained by the Dartmouth Outing Club and Dartmouth's Outdoor Programs Office. The DOC maintains three cabins available for rent by DOC members (Peaks, Alder Brook, and Stoddard), and the OPO maintains seven cabins for use by Dartmouth-affiliated individuals and their guests. Many freshmen spend a few days in the grant as part of their freshmen trips just before freshman orientation. The grant is also used for timber production, but forest-friendly, sustainable practices are employed.

== Geography ==
The grant is bounded by the Maine border to the east, Atkinson and Gilmanton Academy Grant to the north, Dix's Grant to the west, and Wentworth Location to the south. One of the other contemporaneous "Dartmouth" grants was to the north of Dixville but was annexed as the eastern end of Clarksville.

According to the United States Census Bureau, the grant has a total area of 41.9 square miles (108.4 km^{2}), of which 41.4 square miles (107.1 km^{2}) are land and 0.5 square miles (1.3 km^{2}), or 1.21%, are water. The highest point is a 2,840-foot (870 m) knoll just west of Mount Tucker.

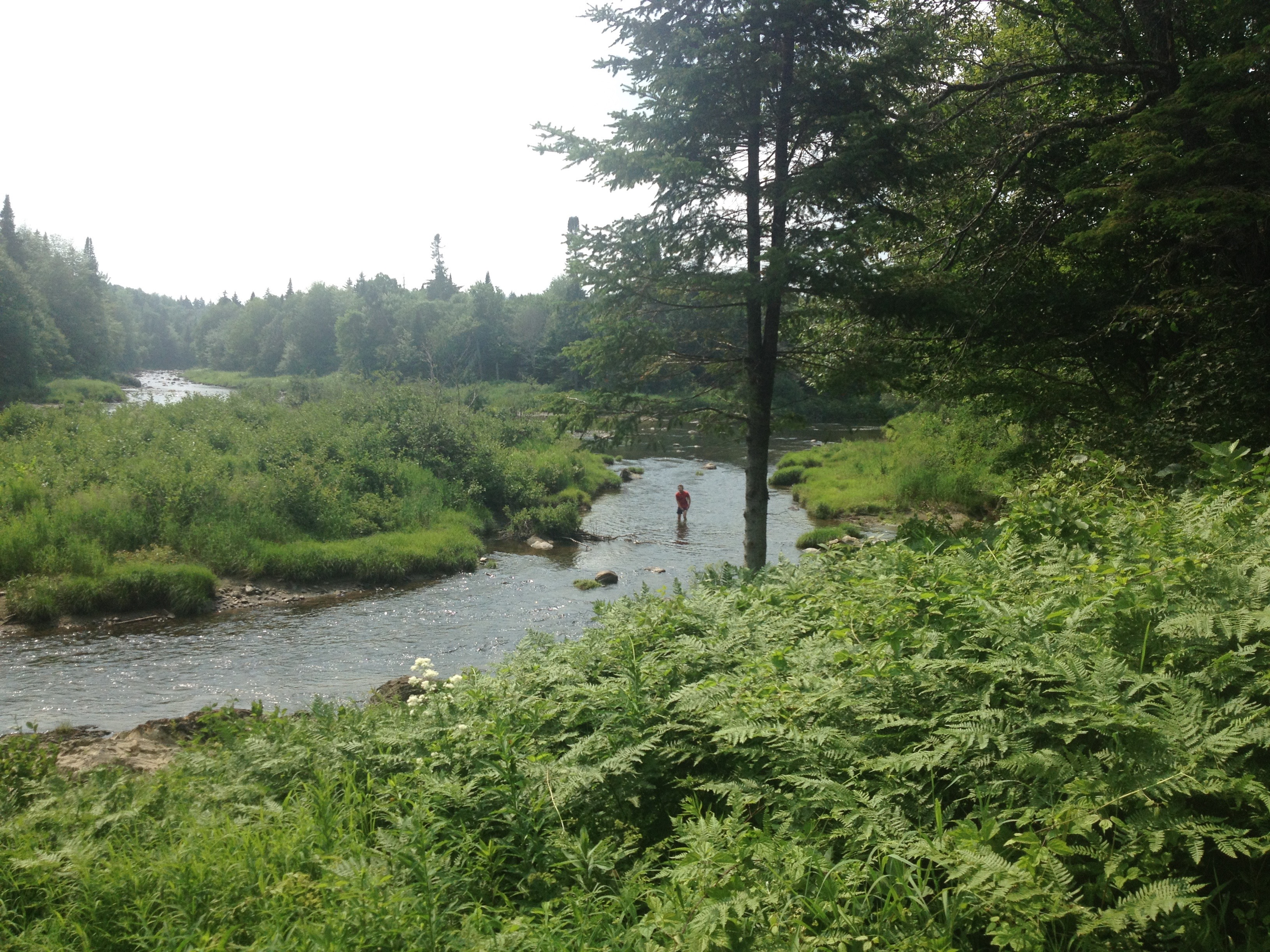
The confluence of the Swift (left) and Dead (right) Diamond rivers

Two rivers, the Dead Diamond and the Swift Diamond, flow through and join in the Second College Grant. The Dead Diamond then flows into the Magalloway River in the southeastern corner of the grant. The entire grant is part of the Androscoggin River watershed.

=== Adjacent municipalities ===
- Atkinson and Gilmanton Academy Grant (north)
- Lincoln Plantation, Maine (east)
- North Oxford, Maine (southeast)
- Wentworth Location (south)
- Dix's Grant (west)

== History ==
In 1766, New Hampshire Governor John Wentworth promised Eleazar Wheelock a grant of a township on which to build Dartmouth College. In 1770, a month after Wheelock received the royal charter, the governor granted the college the township of Landaff (east of present-day Woodsville, New Hampshire), but Wheelock, after viewing the land and others under consideration, decided to establish the college in Hanover. After the American Revolution the college lost its claim to Landaff in 1791, because of the grant's royal derivation and rival claims by American settlers in Landaff.

While the Landaff case underwent litigation to resolve the rival claims, Vermont (then meeting in Norwich) came to the aid of the college and granted it the township of Wheelock (northwest of St. Johnsbury) in 1785. The college divided the town into 100-acre (0.40 km^{2}) lots and leased these to settlers. Over the years the college has sold most of the lots to meet financial needs but still holds title to some properties in the town.

In 1789, New Hampshire, anticipating the college's loss of the Landaff Grant, made good on its original promise of a grant with the town of Clarksville (in northern New Hampshire). This is considered the First College Grant, as it was intended to replace the loss of the original Landaff Grant. The college sold most of this land in the first two years, and had sold off the rest by 1872.

The sale of the Clarksville Grant properties proved to be inadequate, and the college petitioned the state for an additional grant in 1792. Several proposals were made in the legislature, but it wasn't until 1807 that the state responded with the Second College Grant. The lands of the Second College Grant proved to be unattractive to settlers, but sale of timber provided a small but steady income to the college over the next century and a half.

In 1947, Robert S. Monahan was hired as College Forester to oversee the College Grant, and since that time the multiple use philosophy of forest management has been formalized. As a result, the recreational and education concepts have become a prominent part of the grant's management, with untold opportunities for use by the Dartmouth community.

In 1970, Monahan retired, and cutting operations were suspended while a committee, named by the Trustees of the college in 1968 in anticipation of Monahan's retirement, evaluated the existing policies. The Prentiss & Carlisle Company of Bangor, Maine, subsequently prepared a management plan which was transmitted to the college by the committee in early January 1970. This was adopted and referred to as the 10-20 Year Plan, with provisions for an annual sustained yield cut of approximately 4,000 cords per year for the following twenty years. The Seven Islands Land Company of Bangor was retained by the college to oversee forestry management and to implement the Prentiss & Carlisle plan.

It was at this same time that Al Merrill was named Director of Outdoor Affairs and given responsibility for recreational and educational use of the Second College Grant along with oversight of the Moosilauke Ravine Lodge and the Dartmouth Outing Club.

In 1976 evidence of an increase in the spruce budworm had already reached epidemic proportions in Maine and Canada. In response to this blight, the college imposed a two-year moratorium on logging while a plan was developed. In 1978 the college implemented a salvage operation designed to remove the dead fir while saving as much spruce and hardwood as possible. The salvage operation lasted until 1986, at which time the remaining standing dead fir had decayed beyond use.

Once again the harvesting activity was halted while the college took stock of its forest resources and considered its future management options. Seven Islands Land Company conducted a timber cruise survey and used the growth and inventory data to prepare a new 10-20 year management plan. A consensus was reached that the college would be better served by having its own forester. A decision was then made to release Seven Islands Land company of its forest management responsibilities on the College Grant and to once again employ a College Forester, Edward Witt.

After carefully analyzing the data prepared by Seven Islands, Witt decided that the annual growth rate of the forest would allow for a sustainable annual cut of 6,000 cords. The forest plan was modified to allow harvesting as much as 10,000 cords for ten years in an effort to remove the poorer quality trees and improve the overall quality of the forest. This would be followed by several years of cutting lesser volumes but higher quality trees. Further, because the forest is managed for the benefit of wildlife, cutting operations were modified to reflect that policy. Since 1987, the forest has been managed accordingly, with the New Hampshire Fish and Game Department actively involved in the location, design, and methodology of the harvesting activity.

In 2019, Hell Gate Gorge cabin, built in 1974, burned down due to a chimney fire. Former Democratic candidate for New Hampshire governor, Colin Van Ostern, was staying in the cabin with several other guests during the incident.

== Demographics ==
Historical population
Census	Pop.	Note	%±
1870	11		—
1880	18		63.6%
1890	13		−27.8%
1930	17		—
1940	0		−100.0%
1950	0		—
1960	6		—
1970	0		−100.0%
1980	2		—
1990	0		−100.0%
2000	0		—
2010	0		—
2020	1		—
U.S. Decennial Census

As of the 2020 census, there was one person recorded living in the grant. In 1930, there were 17 people living in the grant; the population has been less than 10 since then and zero for the three censuses prior to 2020.
