= Wentworth Location, New Hampshire =

Township in Coos County, New Hampshire, United States

- Township
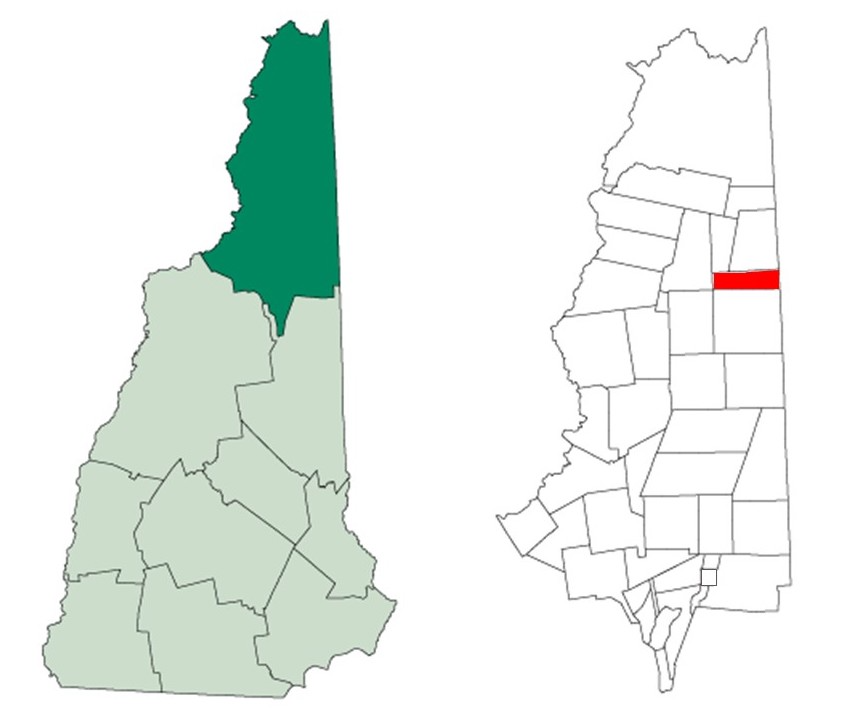
- Location in Coös County, New Hampshire
- Coordinates: 44°50′32″N 71°8′1″W
- Country: United States
- State: New Hampshire
- County: Coös

Area
  - Total: 19.3 sq mi (49.9 km^{2})
  - Land: 18.3 sq mi (47.5 km^{2})
  - Water: 0.93 sq mi (2.4 km^{2}) 4.79%
- Elevation: 1,460 ft (450 m)

Population (2020)
  - Total: 28
- Time zone: UTC-5 (Eastern)
  - Summer (DST): UTC-4 (Eastern)
- Area code: 603
- FIPS code: 33-007-80740
- GNIS feature ID: 873751

Wentworth Location is a township in Coös County, New Hampshire, United States. Its population was 28 at the 2020 census. It is part of the Berlin, NH-VT Micropolitan Statistical Area.

In New Hampshire, locations, grants, townships (which are different from towns), and purchases are unincorporated portions of a county that are not part of any town and have limited self-government (if any, as many are uninhabited).

Wentworth Location fell within the path of totality during the solar eclipse of April 8, 2024.

== History ==
The land was sold in 1797 to George Wentworth of Portsmouth and operated as an unorganized "plantation" from 1797 to 1881. It was incorporated as a town from 1881 to 1966, then became an organized township.

== Geography ==
Wentworth Location is along the border with Maine and north of the town of Errol, east of Dixville. To the north is the Second College Grant. The Magalloway River traverses the southeastern corner, as does New Hampshire Route 16. Mount Dustan, elevation 2,878 feet (877 m) above sea level, is the location's highest point and overlooks the village from the west. Black Mountain, elevation 2,750 feet (840 m) is in the more remote western edge of the location. At one point there was a fire tower on Mount Dustan.

According to the United States Census Bureau, the location has a total area of 19.3 square miles (49.9 km^{2}), of which 18.3 square miles (47.5 km^{2}) are land and 0.93 square miles (2.4 km^{2}), or 4.79%, are water.

=== Adjacent Municipalities ===
- Second College Grant (north)
- North Oxford, Maine (east)
- Errol (south)
- Millsfield (southwest)
- Dixville (west)
- Dix's Grant (northwest)

== Demographics ==
Historical population
Census	Pop.	Note	%±
1860	57		—
1870	38		−33.3%
1880	55		44.7%
1890	25		−54.5%
1900	61		144.0%
1910	51		−16.4%
1920	50		−2.0%
1930	38		−24.0%
1940	57		50.0%
1950	48		−15.8%
1960	58		20.8%
1970	37		−36.2%
1980	49		32.4%
1990	53		8.2%
2000	44		−17.0%
2010	33		−25.0%
2020	28		−15.2%
U.S. Decennial Census

As of the 2000 census, there were 44 people, 20 households, and 13 families living in the location. The population density was 2.3 inhabitants per square mile (0.89/km^{2}). There were 109 housing units at an average density of 5.8 per square mile (2.2/km^{2}). The racial makeup of the location was 90.91% White, and 9.09% from two or more races.

There were 20 households, out of which 15.0% had children under the age of 18 living with them, 50.0% were married couples living together, 5.0% had a female householder with no husband present, and 35.0% were non-families. 30.0% of all households were made up of individuals, and none had someone living alone who was 65 years of age or older. The average household size was 2.20 and the average family size was 2.69.

In the location the population was spread out, with 15.9% under the age of 18, 9.1% from 18 to 24, 25.0% from 25 to 44, 38.6% from 45 to 64, and 11.4% who were 65 years of age or older. The median age was 45 years. For every 100 females, there were 120.0 males. For every 100 females age 18 and over, there were 131.3 males.

The median income for a household in the location was $37,500, and the median income for a family was $28,750. Males had a median income of $46,667 versus $21,250 for females. The per capita income for the location was $37,237. 8.2% of the population and none of the families were below the poverty line.
