= 1908 United States presidential election in New Hampshire =

- November 3, 1908

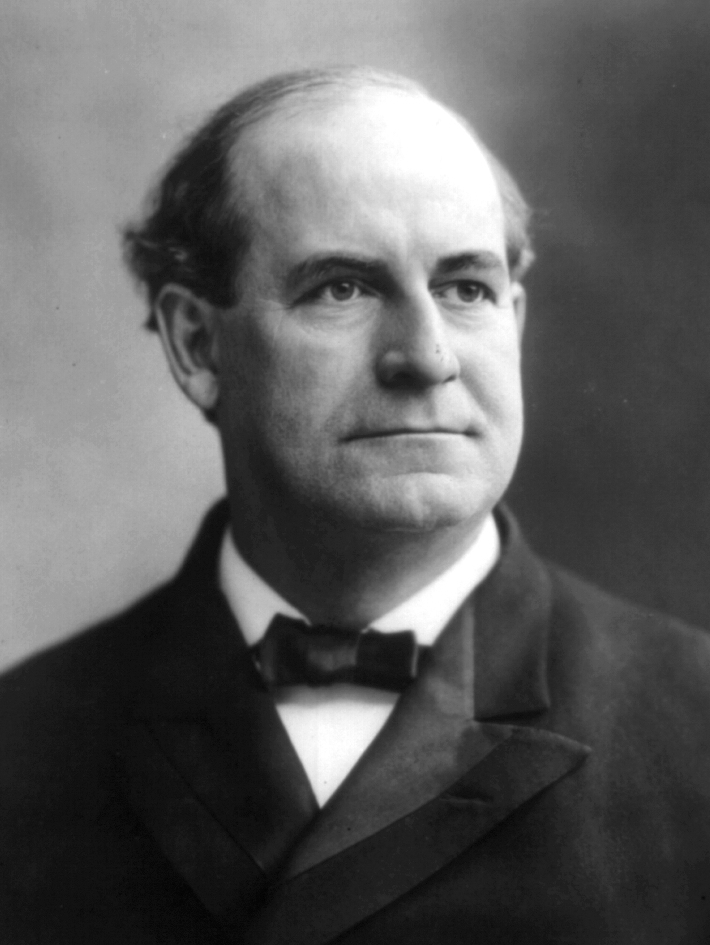
Nominee	William Howard Taft	William Jennings Bryan
Party	Republican	Democratic
Home state	Ohio	Nebraska
Running mate	James S. Sherman	John W. Kern
Electoral vote	4	0
Popular vote	53,149	33,655
Percentage	59.32%	37.56%

Taft
40–50%
50–60%
60–70%
70–80%
80–90%
90–100%
Bryan
40–50%
50–60%
60–70%
70–80%
80–90%
Tie
50%
President before election
Theodore Roosevelt
Republican
Elected President
William Howard Taft
Republican

The 1908 United States presidential election in New Hampshire took place on November 3, 1908, as part of the 1908 United States presidential election. Voters chose four representatives, or electors to the Electoral College, who voted for president and vice president.

New Hampshire solidly voted for the Republican nominees, Secretary of War William Howard Taft of Ohio and his running mate James S. Sherman of New York. They defeated the Democratic nominees, former U.S. Representative William Jennings Bryan of Nebraska and his running mate John W. Kern of Indiana. Taft won the state by a margin of 21.76%.

Bryan had previously lost New Hampshire to William McKinley in both 1896 and 1900.

== Results ==
1908 United States presidential election in New Hampshire
Party	Candidate	Running mate	Popular vote		Electoral vote	
Party	Candidate	Running mate	Count	%	Count	%
Republican	William Howard Taft of Ohio	James Schoolcraft Sherman of New York	53,149	59.32%	4	100.00%
Democratic	William Jennings Bryan of Nebraska	John Worth Kern of Indiana	33,655	37.56%	0	0.00%
Socialist	Eugene Victor Debs of Indiana	Benjamin Hanford of New York	1,299	1.45%	0	0.00%
Prohibition	Eugene Wilder Chafin of Illinois	Aaron Sherman Watkins of Ohio	905	1.01%	0	0.00%
Independence	Thomas Louis Hisgen of Massachusetts	John Temple Graves of Georgia	584	0.65%	0	0.00%
N/A	Others	Others	8	0.01%	0	0.00%
Total			89,600	100.00%	4	100.00%

=== Results by county ===
County	William Howard Taft Republican		William Jennings Bryan Democratic		Eugene V. Debs Socialist		Eugene W. Chafin Prohibition		Thomas L. Hisgen Independence		Margin		Total votes cast
County	#	%	#	%	#	%	#	%	#	%	#	%	Total votes cast
Belknap	2,916	61.07%	1,692	35.43%	41	3.50%	99	2.07%	27	0.57%	1,224	25.63%	4,775
Carroll	2,562	60.74%	1,591	37.72%	14	1.54%	37	0.88%	14	0.33%	971	23.02%	4,218
Cheshire	4,160	64.74%	1,917	29.83%	232	5.43%	80	1.24%	37	0.58%	2,243	34.91%	6,426
Coös	3,294	58.34%	2,216	39.25%	65	2.41%	31	0.55%	40	0.71%	1,078	19.09%	5,646
Grafton	6,323	62.60%	3,582	35.46%	65	1.94%	95	0.94%	36	0.36%	2,741	27.14%	10,101
Hillsborough	12,568	57.29%	8,701	39.66%	295	3.05%	151	0.69%	223	1.02%	3,867	17.63%	21,938
Merrimack	6,932	56.51%	4,846	39.50%	282	3.99%	156	1.27%	51	0.42%	2,086	17.00%	12,267
Rockingham	6,814	60.34%	4,118	36.47%	161	3.20%	119	1.05%	81	0.72%	2,696	23.87%	11,293
Strafford	4,822	56.25%	3,523	41.09%	79	2.66%	108	1.26%	41	0.48%	1,299	15.15%	8,573
Sullivan	2,758	63.21%	1,469	33.67%	65	3.12%	29	0.66%	42	0.96%	1,289	29.54%	4,363
Total	53,149	59.32%	33,655	37.56%	1,299	3.12%	905	1.01%	592	0.66%	19,494	21.76%	89,600
