= 1896 United States presidential election in New Hampshire =

- November 3, 1896

Nominee	William McKinley	William Jennings Bryan
Party	Republican	Democratic
Alliance		Populist
Home state	Ohio	Nebraska
Running mate	Garret Hobart	Arthur Sewall
Electoral vote	4	0
Popular vote	57,444	21,650
Percentage	68.66%	25.88%

McKinley
40–50%
50–60%
60–70%
70–80%
80–90%
90–100%
Bryan
40–50%
50–60%
60–70%
President before election
Grover Cleveland
Democratic
Elected President
William McKinley
Republican

The 1896 United States presidential election in New Hampshire took place on November 3, 1896, as part of the 1896 United States presidential election. Voters chose four representatives, or electors to the Electoral College, who voted for president and vice president.

New Hampshire overwhelmingly voted for the Republican nominee, former governor of Ohio William McKinley, over the Democratic nominee, former U.S. Representative from Nebraska William Jennings Bryan. McKinley won the state by a margin of 42.78%.

With 68.66% of the popular vote, New Hampshire would be McKinley's third strongest victory in terms of percentage in the popular vote after neighboring Vermont and Massachusetts. The state was also the best performance for National Democratic Party candidate John M. Palmer, who won 4.21% of the vote.

Bryan, running on a platform of free silver, appealed strongly to Western miners and farmers in the 1896 election, but held little-to-no appeal in the Northeastern states like New Hampshire. This was the first time since 1860 that a Republican won every county in the state.

Bryan would lose New Hampshire to McKinley again four years later and would later lose the state again in 1908 to William Howard Taft.

== Results ==
1896 United States presidential election in New Hampshire
Party	Candidate	Votes	Percentage	Electoral votes
Republican	William McKinley	57,444	68.66%	4
Democratic	William Jennings Bryan	21,271	25.43%	0
Populist	William Jennings Bryan	379	0.45%	0
Total	William Jennings Bryan	21,650	25.88%	0
National Democratic	John M. Palmer	3,520	4.21%	0
Prohibition	Joshua Levering	779	0.93%	0
Socialist Labor	Charles H. Matchett	228	0.27%	0
National Party	Charles Eugene Bentley	49	0.06%	0
Totals		83,670	100.00%	4
Voter turnout				—

=== Results by county ===
County	William McKinley Republican		William Jennings Bryan Democratic		John M. Palmer National Democratic		Joshua Levering Prohibition		Various candidates Other parties		Margin		Total votes cast
County	#	%	#	%	#	%	#	%	#	%	#	%	Total votes cast
Belknap	3,465	72.67%	978	20.51%	263	5.52%	58	1.22%	4	0.08%	2,487	52.16%	4,768
Carroll	2,800	65.88%	1,214	28.56%	175	4.12%	57	1.34%	4	0.09%	1,586	37.32%	4,250
Cheshire	4,818	75.60%	1,272	19.96%	231	3.62%	45	0.71%	7	0.11%	3,546	55.64%	6,373
Coös	3,253	66.01%	1,489	30.22%	149	3.02%	35	0.71%	2	0.04%	1,764	35.80%	4,928
Grafton	6,199	68.15%	2,306	25.35%	459	5.05%	109	1.20%	23	0.25%	3,893	42.80%	9,096
Hillsborough	13,080	67.80%	4,965	25.73%	917	4.75%	144	0.75%	187	0.97%	8,115	42.06%	19,293
Merrimack	7,715	65.67%	3,310	28.17%	562	4.78%	155	1.32%	7	0.06%	4,405	37.49%	11,749
Rockingham	7,881	69.32%	2,992	26.32%	390	3.43%	87	0.77%	19	0.17%	4,889	43.00%	11,369
Strafford	5,483	68.58%	2,259	28.26%	173	2.16%	62	0.78%	18	0.23%	3,224	40.33%	7,995
Sullivan	2,750	71.45%	865	22.47%	201	5.22%	27	0.70%	6	0.16%	1,885	48.97%	3,849
Totals	57,444	68.66%	21,650	25.88%	3,520	4.21%	779	0.93%	277	0.33%	35,794	42.78%	83,670

== See also ==
- United States presidential elections in New Hampshire
