= Second East Branch Magalloway River =

Coordinates: 45.24338°N 71.00452°W

Location
- Country: United States

Physical characteristics
- Source
  - location: Maine

The Second East Branch Magalloway River is a 3.5-mile-long (5.6 km) river in northwestern Maine. It is a tributary of the Magalloway River, part of the Androscoggin River watershed.

== See also ==
- List of rivers of Maine
