= First East Branch Magalloway River =

Coordinates: 45.19783°N 70.97813°W

Location
- Country: United States

Physical characteristics
- Source
  - location: Maine

The First East Branch Magalloway River is a 7.0-mile-long (11.3 km) river in northwestern Maine. It is a tributary of the Magalloway River, which flows to the Androscoggin River and ultimately to the tidal Kennebec River and the Atlantic Ocean.

== See also ==
- List of rivers of Maine
