= 1900 United States presidential election in New Hampshire =

- November 6, 1900
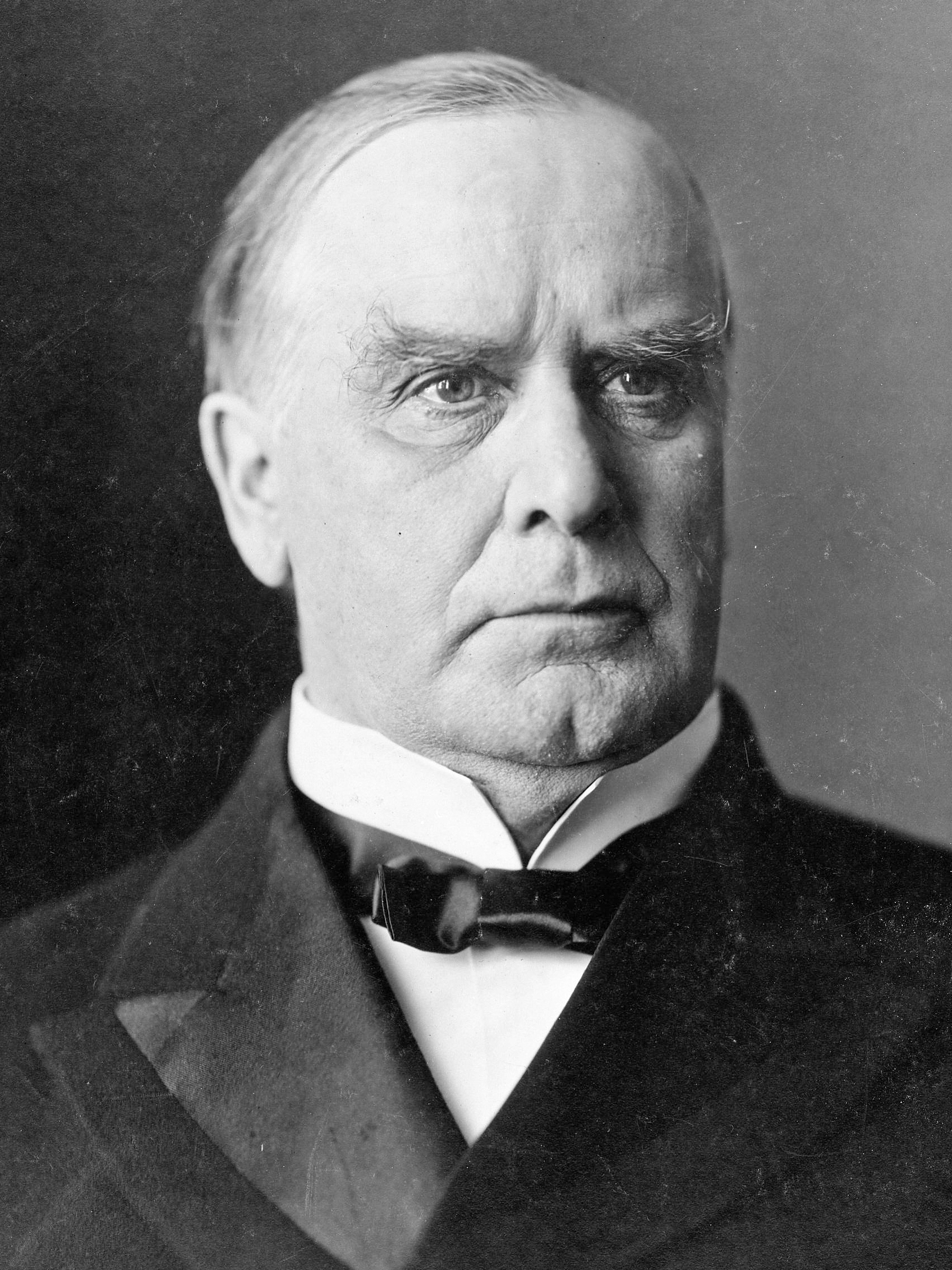

Nominee	William McKinley	William Jennings Bryan
Party	Republican	Democratic
Home state	Ohio	Nebraska
Running mate	Theodore Roosevelt	Adlai Stevenson I
Electoral vote	4	0
Popular vote	54,799	35,489
Percentage	59.33%	38.42%

McKinley
40–50%
50–60%
60–70%
70–80%
80–90%
90–100%
Bryan
40–50%
50–60%
60–70%
70–80%
Tie
50%
President before election
William McKinley
Republican
Elected President
William McKinley
Republican

The 1900 United States presidential election in New Hampshire took place on November 6, 1900, as part of the 1900 United States presidential election. Voters chose four representatives, or electors, to the Electoral College, who voted for president and vice president.

New Hampshire decisively voted for the Republican nominee, President William McKinley, over the Democratic nominee, former U.S. representative and 1896 Democratic presidential nominee William Jennings Bryan. McKinley won New Hampshire by a margin of 20.91 points in this rematch of the 1896 presidential election. The return of economic prosperity and recent victory in the Spanish–American War helped McKinley to score a decisive victory.

Bryan had previously lost New Hampshire to McKinley four years earlier, and would lose the state again in 1908 to William Howard Taft.

== Results ==
1900 United States presidential election in New Hampshire
Party	Candidate	Running mate	Popular vote		Electoral vote	
Party	Candidate	Running mate	Count	%	Count	%
Republican	William McKinley of Ohio (incumbent)	Theodore Roosevelt of New York	54,799	59.33%	4	100.00%
Democratic	William Jennings Bryan of Nebraska	Adlai Ewing Stevenson I of Illinois	35,489	38.42%	0	0.00%
Prohibition	John Granville Woolley of Illinois	Henry Brewer Metcalf of Rhode Island	1,270	1.37%	0	0.00%
Socialist	Eugene Victor Debs of Indiana	Job Harriman of California	790	0.86%	0	0.00%
N/A	Others	Others	16	0.02%	0	0.00%
Total			92,364	100.00%	4	100.00%

=== Results by county ===
County	William McKinley Republican		William Jennings Bryan Democratic		John Granville Woolley Prohibition		Various candidates Other parties		Margin		Total votes cast
County	#	%	#	%	#	%	#	%	#	%	Total votes cast
Belknap	3,099	61.32%	1,819	35.99%	116	2.44%	20	0.42%	1,280	26.92%	5,054
Carroll	2,626	57.26%	1,859	40.54%	87	2.01%	14	0.32%	767	17.68%	4,586
Cheshire	4,435	66.73%	2,120	31.90%	83	1.27%	8	0.12%	2,315	35.34%	6,646
Coös	3,383	57.40%	2,436	41.33%	55	0.97%	20	0.35%	947	16.73%	5,894
Grafton	6,177	61.71%	3,619	36.15%	173	1.77%	41	0.42%	2,558	26.23%	10,010
Hillsborough	12,653	58.76%	8,339	38.72%	212	0.97%	331	1.51%	4,314	19.70%	21,535
Merrimack	7,517	57.65%	5,248	40.25%	224	1.80%	50	0.40%	2,269	18.24%	13,039
Rockingham	7,363	59.29%	4,719	38.00%	153	1.29%	184	1.55%	2,644	22.34%	12,419
Strafford	4,987	55.32%	3,792	42.06%	117	1.36%	119	1.38%	1,195	13.89%	9,015
Sullivan	2,559	61.43%	1,538	36.92%	50	1.16%	19	0.44%	1,021	23.63%	4,166
Totals	54,799	59.33%	35,489	38.42%	1,270	1.41%	806	0.89%	19,310	21.42%	92,364

== See also ==
- United States presidential elections in New Hampshire
