= Third East Branch Magalloway River =

Coordinates: 45.25699°N 71.02785°W

Location
- Country: United States

Physical characteristics
- Source
  - location: Maine

The Third East Branch Magalloway River is a 4.0-mile-long (6.4 km) stream in northwestern Maine. It is a tributary of the West Branch Magalloway River, which flows to the Magalloway River, then the Androscoggin River, and ultimately to the tidal Kennebec River and the Atlantic Ocean.

== See also ==
- List of rivers of Maine
