= Dix's Grant, New Hampshire =

Township in Coos County, New Hampshire, United States

- Township
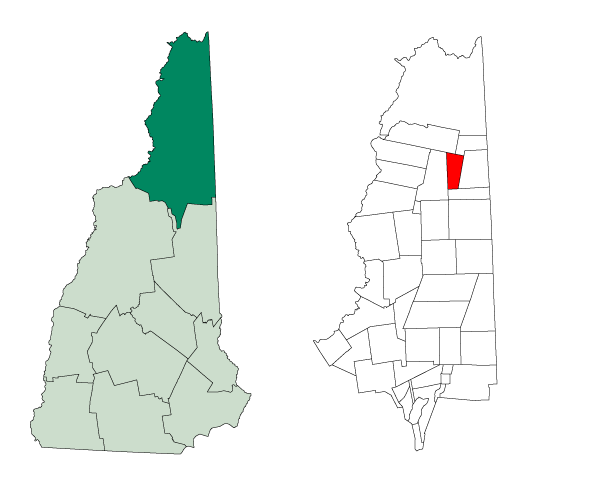
- Location in Coös County, New Hampshire
- Coordinates: 44°54′46″N 71°11′31″W
- Country: United States
- State: New Hampshire
- County: Coös

Area
  - Total: 20.1 sq mi (52.0 km^{2})
  - Land: 20.0 sq mi (51.9 km^{2})
  - Water: 0.039 sq mi (0.1 km^{2}) 0.21%
- Elevation: 2,120 ft (650 m)

Population (2020)
  - Total: 0
- Time zone: UTC-5 (Eastern)
  - Summer (DST): UTC-4 (Eastern)
- Area code: 603
- FIPS code: 33-007-18340
- GNIS feature ID: 871113

Dix's Grant is a township in Coös County, New Hampshire, United States. As of the 2020 census, the grant had a population of zero and was also estimated to be zero in 2025. In New Hampshire, locations, grants, townships (which are different from towns), and purchases are unincorporated portions of a county which are not part of any town and have limited self-government (if any, as many are uninhabited).

Dix's Grant fell within the path of totality during the solar eclipse of April 8, 2024.

== History ==
Dix's Grant was originally part of adjacent Dixville, which was granted by the legislature to Timothy Dix Jr. in 1805 and contained about 29,340 acres (118.7 km^{2}); the price was $4,500. The eastern portion of the original grant (north of Wentworth Location) became present-day Dix's Grant.

== Geography ==
According to the U.S. Census Bureau, the grant has a total area of 20.1 square miles (52.0 km^{2}), 0.04 square miles (0.11 km^{2}) of which is covered by water. The township is drained by the Swift Diamond River and its tributary, Fourmile Brook. The Swift Diamond is an east-flowing tributary of the Dead Diamond River and part of the Androscoggin River watershed. The grant's highest point is 3,279 feet (999 m) above sea level, along the ridge of Crystal Mountain.

=== Adjacent municipalities ===
- Atkinson and Gilmanton Academy Grant (northeast)
- Second College Grant (east)
- Wentworth Location (south)
- Dixville (west)
- Clarksville (northwest)

== Climate ==
Crystal Mountain is a mountain ridge in Dix's Grant. The mountain has a humid continental climate (Köppen Dfb) bordering on subarctic climate (Köppen Dfc).

Climate data for Crystal Mountain 44.9445 N, 71.2098 W, Elevation: 3,117 ft (950 m) (1991–2020 normals)
Month	Jan	Feb	Mar	Apr	May	Jun	Jul	Aug	Sep	Oct	Nov	Dec	Year
Mean daily maximum °F (°C)	19.0 (−7.2)	21.4 (−5.9)	29.8 (−1.2)	43.8 (6.6)	57.0 (13.9)	65.9 (18.8)	70.3 (21.3)	69.2 (20.7)	62.4 (16.9)	49.1 (9.5)	35.3 (1.8)	25.3 (−3.7)	45.7 (7.6)
Daily mean °F (°C)	9.6 (−12.4)	11.4 (−11.4)	19.8 (−6.8)	34.3 (1.3)	46.2 (7.9)	55.5 (13.1)	59.9 (15.5)	58.6 (14.8)	51.8 (11.0)	40.0 (4.4)	28.2 (−2.1)	17.2 (−8.2)	36.0 (2.3)
Mean daily minimum °F (°C)	0.1 (−17.7)	1.3 (−17.1)	9.9 (−12.3)	24.9 (−3.9)	35.4 (1.9)	45.0 (7.2)	49.5 (9.7)	48.1 (8.9)	41.3 (5.2)	30.9 (−0.6)	21.0 (−6.1)	9.2 (−12.7)	26.4 (−3.1)
Average precipitation inches (mm)	4.28 (109)	3.57 (91)	4.16 (106)	4.28 (109)	5.05 (128)	5.95 (151)	5.60 (142)	5.40 (137)	4.56 (116)	5.66 (144)	4.54 (115)	4.79 (122)	57.84 (1,470)
Source: PRISM Climate Group

== Demographics ==
Historical population
Census	Pop.	Note	%±
1910	33		—
1960	0		—
1970	0		—
1980	0		—
1990	0		—
2000	0		—
2010	1		—
2020	0		−100.0%
U.S. Decennial Census

As of the 2020 census, the grant had a population of zero.
