= East Branch Dead Diamond River =

- Location within New Hampshire Location within the United States

Location
- Country: United States
- State: New Hampshire
- County: Coos
- Town and township: Pittsburg, Atkinson & Gilmanton Academy Grant

Physical characteristics
- Source
  - location: Pittsburg
  - coordinates: 45°7′6″N 71°7′24″W
  - elevation: 2,580 ft (790 m)
- Mouth: Dead Diamond River
  - location: Atkinson & Gilmanton Academy Grant
  - coordinates: 45°0′9″N 71°8′54″W
  - elevation: 1,435 ft (437 m)
- Length: 12.7 mi (20.4 km)

Basin features
- Tributaries
  - left: Laflamme Brook, Boardpile Brook

The East Branch of the Dead Diamond River is a 12.7-mile-long (20.4 km) river in northern New Hampshire in the United States. It is a tributary of the Dead Diamond River, located in the Androscoggin River watershed of Maine and New Hampshire.

The East Branch of the Dead Diamond River rises in the town of Pittsburg between 3,627-foot (1,106 m) Stub Hill and 3,230-foot (980 m) Diamond Ridge. Nearly the entire length of the river is in Pittsburg, with a small portion at its southern end in the Atkinson and Gilmanton Academy Grant. A highlight along the river are the 40-foot-high (12 m) Garfield Falls.

== See also ==
- List of rivers of New Hampshire
