= Coleman State Park =

State park in Coös County, New Hampshire

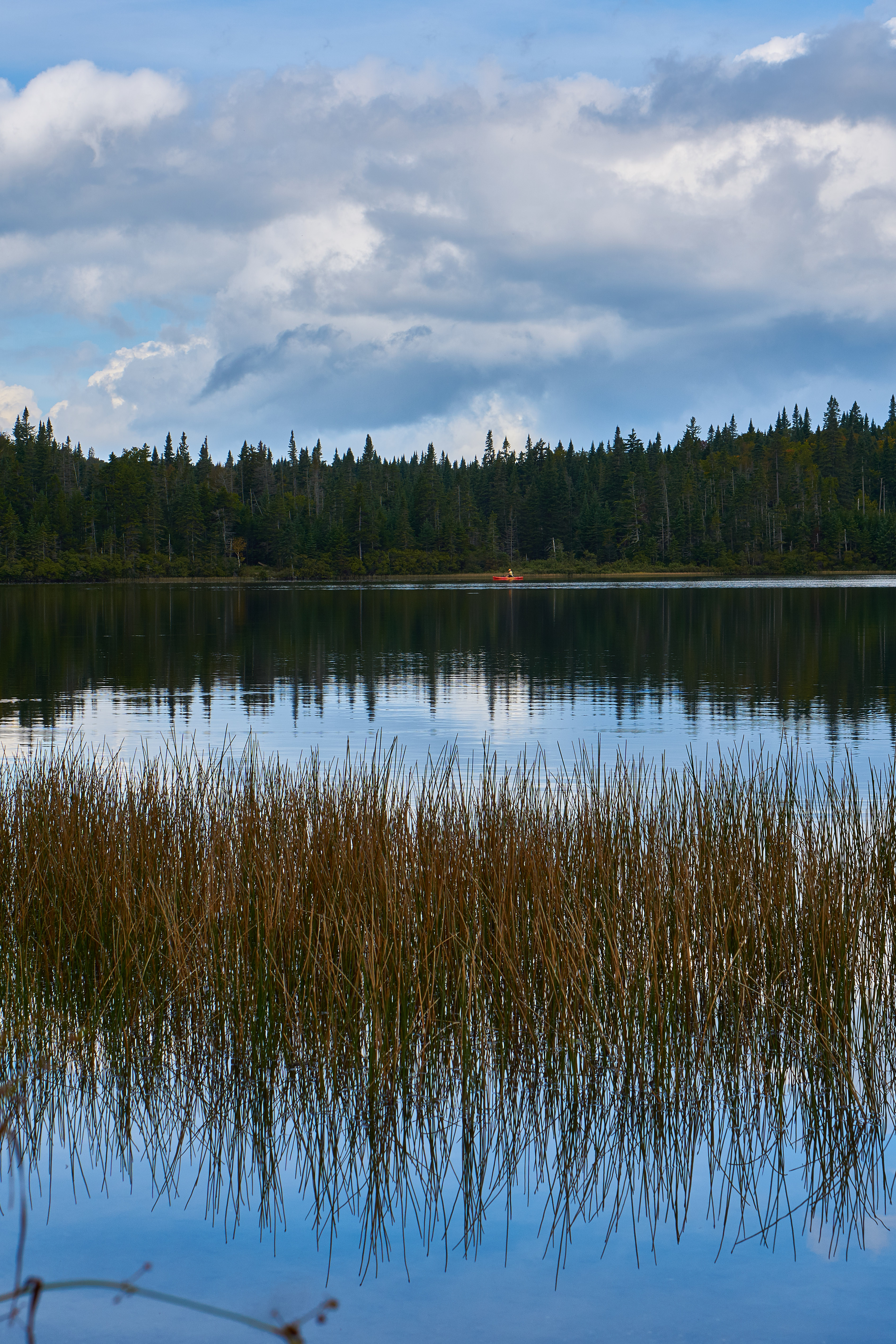
- Little Diamond Pond

- Location within New Hampshire Location within the United States
- Interactive map of Coleman State Park
- Location: Stewartstown, New Hampshire, United States
- Coordinates: 44°56′17″N 71°19′28″W
- Area: 1,573 acres (637 ha)
- Elevation: 2,375 feet (724 m)
- Established: 1956
- Administrator: New Hampshire Division of Parks and Recreation
- Website: Official website
- New Hampshire State Parks

Coleman State Park is a public recreation area on Little Diamond Pond in Stewartstown, New Hampshire. The state park was created when the state purchased the 1,200-acre (490 ha) Camp Diamond property from the Coleman family in 1956. Park activities include camping, hiking, fishing, ATV riding, and picnicking.

== Climate ==
There is a weather station for Diamond Pond, situated at an elevation of 2200 ft (671 m).

Climate data for Diamond Pond, New Hampshire, 1998-2011 normals: 2200ft (671m)
| Month | Jan | Feb | Mar | Apr | May | Jun | Jul | Aug | Sep | Oct | Nov | Dec | Year |
|---|---|---|---|---|---|---|---|---|---|---|---|---|---|
| Record high °F (°C) | 53 (12) | 59 (15) | 68 (20) | 80 (27) | 83 (28) | 87 (31) | 86 (30) | 85 (29) | 86 (30) | 76 (24) | 65 (18) | 58 (14) | 87 (31) |
| Mean maximum °F (°C) | 43.1 (6.2) | 45.5 (7.5) | 52.9 (11.6) | 67.6 (19.8) | 76.9 (24.9) | 81.9 (27.7) | 81.2 (27.3) | 79.7 (26.5) | 77.4 (25.2) | 69.5 (20.8) | 58.5 (14.7) | 48.6 (9.2) | 83.6 (28.7) |
| Mean daily maximum °F (°C) | 19.4 (−7.0) | 23.0 (−5.0) | 32.2 (0.1) | 43.8 (6.6) | 58.9 (14.9) | 66.5 (19.2) | 70.3 (21.3) | 69.1 (20.6) | 63.2 (17.3) | 48.6 (9.2) | 37.9 (3.3) | 27.2 (−2.7) | 46.7 (8.1) |
| Daily mean °F (°C) | 10.1 (−12.2) | 12.7 (−10.7) | 21.8 (−5.7) | 34.0 (1.1) | 48.6 (9.2) | 56.9 (13.8) | 61.2 (16.2) | 59.8 (15.4) | 53.6 (12.0) | 40.6 (4.8) | 30.9 (−0.6) | 18.4 (−7.6) | 37.4 (3.0) |
| Mean daily minimum °F (°C) | 0.6 (−17.4) | 2.5 (−16.4) | 11.3 (−11.5) | 24.4 (−4.2) | 38.3 (3.5) | 47.4 (8.6) | 52.1 (11.2) | 50.4 (10.2) | 44.1 (6.7) | 32.5 (0.3) | 23.9 (−4.5) | 9.7 (−12.4) | 28.1 (−2.2) |
| Mean minimum °F (°C) | −22.7 (−30.4) | −18.2 (−27.9) | −13.0 (−25.0) | 11.7 (−11.3) | 24.6 (−4.1) | 34.3 (1.3) | 41.9 (5.5) | 38.4 (3.6) | 30.6 (−0.8) | 19.1 (−7.2) | 8.5 (−13.1) | −10.4 (−23.6) | −24.8 (−31.6) |
| Record low °F (°C) | −38 (−39) | −29 (−34) | −22 (−30) | 2 (−17) | 18 (−8) | 30 (−1) | 36 (2) | 33 (1) | 22 (−6) | 13 (−11) | −2 (−19) | −27 (−33) | −38 (−39) |
| Average precipitation inches (mm) | 4.51 (115) | 4.23 (107) | 5.11 (130) | 3.78 (96) | 4.79 (122) | 6.51 (165) | 5.36 (136) | 5.34 (136) | 4.68 (119) | 5.60 (142) | 4.95 (126) | 4.90 (124) | 59.76 (1,518) |
| Average snowfall inches (cm) | 44.8 (114) | 41.5 (105) | 39.4 (100) | 13.3 (34) | 2.3 (5.8) | 0.0 (0.0) | 0.0 (0.0) | 0.0 (0.0) | 0.0 (0.0) | 8.8 (22) | 27.2 (69) | 45.0 (114) | 222.3 (563.8) |
| Average extreme snow depth inches (cm) | 29.6 (75) | 38.8 (99) | 43.6 (111) | 32.2 (82) | 2.5 (6.4) | 0.0 (0.0) | 0.0 (0.0) | 0.0 (0.0) | 0.0 (0.0) | 4.6 (12) | 10.9 (28) | 21.1 (54) | 45.9 (117) |
| Average precipitation days (≥ 0.01 in) | 19.9 | 16.1 | 17.7 | 11.0 | 14.2 | 16.7 | 15.8 | 14.9 | 12.9 | 14.9 | 17.8 | 18.4 | 190.3 |
| Average snowy days (≥ 0.1 in) | 18.7 | 15.6 | 14.7 | 5.9 | 1.0 | 0.1 | 0.0 | 0.0 | 0.0 | 3.7 | 11.1 | 16.4 | 87.2 |
Source: XMACIS2 (normals, extremes & precip/snow)
