= Magalloway River =

River in Maine and New Hampshire, United States

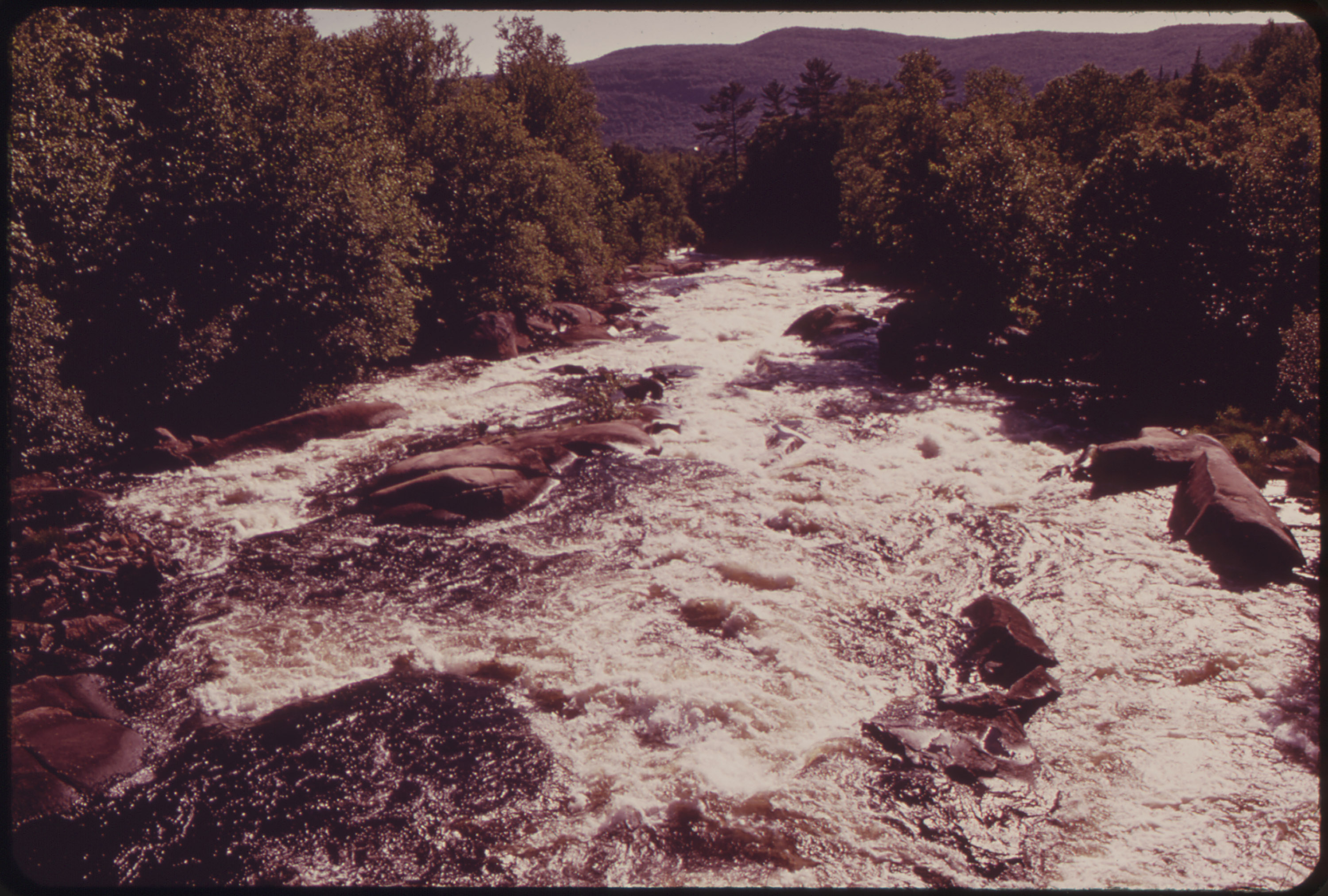
- Magalloway River below Aziscohos Dam in western Maine

- Location within Maine Location within New Hampshire Location within the United States

Location
- Country: United States
- States: Maine, New Hampshire
- Counties: Oxford, ME, Coos, NH
- Townships: North Oxford, ME, Lincoln Plantation, ME, Magalloway, ME, Second College Grant, NH, Wentworth Location, NH, Errol, NH

Physical characteristics
- Source: Confluence of West Branch and Third East Branch
  - location: North Oxford, ME
  - coordinates: 45°15′26″N 71°1′37″W
  - elevation: 1,850 ft (560 m)
- Mouth: Androscoggin River
  - location: Errol, NH
  - coordinates: 44°47′0″N 71°3′53″W
  - elevation: 1,245 ft (379 m)
- Length: 48 mi (77 km)

Basin features
- Tributaries
  - left: Second East Branch, First East Branch, Sturtevant Stream
  - right: Little Magalloway River, Abbott Brook, Dead Diamond River, Bear Brook

The Magalloway River is a river in northwestern Maine and northern New Hampshire in the United States. It is a tributary of the Androscoggin River, which flows to the Kennebec River at Merrymeeting Bay in Maine, near the Atlantic Ocean. The total length of the river is 30 miles (48 km), or 48 miles (77 km) if the distances across intervening lakes are included.

The Magalloway River rises near the extreme northwestern corner of Maine, at the juncture of the West Branch and the Third East Branch of the Magalloway. The river flows south through logging country to 2.5-mile-long (4.0 km) Parmachenee Lake, then descends for another 2.6 miles (4.2 km) to the 15-mile-long (24 km) Aziscohos Lake. Below the lake dam, the Magalloway turns west and descends 250 feet (76 m) in 2 miles (3.2 km) to the village of Wilsons Mills, Maine, before once again turning south, now along the New Hampshire–Maine border. The river ends where it joins the outlet of Umbagog Lake, forming the Androscoggin River.

Tributaries of the Magalloway include the West Branch, the First, Second, and Third East Branches, the Little Magalloway River, and the Dead Diamond River. The Magalloway passes through the townships of Parmachenee, Lynchtown, Parkertown, Lincoln, and Magalloway in Maine, and the townships of Second College Grant and Wentworth Location in New Hampshire.

Its name is from some Native American language, meaning "large tail".

== Aziscohos Lake ==
Aziscohos Lake
- Location within Maine
- Location: Oxford County, Maine
- Coordinates: 45°00′00″N 71°00′30″W
- Max. length: 15 mi (24 km)
- Surface area: 6,872 acres (2,781 ha)
- Max. depth: 60 feet (18 m)
- Water volume: 157,945 acre⋅ft (194,822,000 m^{3})
- Surface elevation: 1,516 ft (462 m)

Aziscohos Lake extends upstream from Aziscohos Dam in Lincoln Plantation through Parkertown township into Lynchtown township. The reservoir is good habitat for brook trout and land-locked Atlantic salmon. There is a public boat launch site at the south end of the reservoir off Maine State Route 16.

== See also ==
- List of rivers of Maine
- List of rivers of New Hampshire
- Metallak, known as "The Lone Indian of the Magalloway"
