= Lincoln Plantation, Maine =

- Plantation
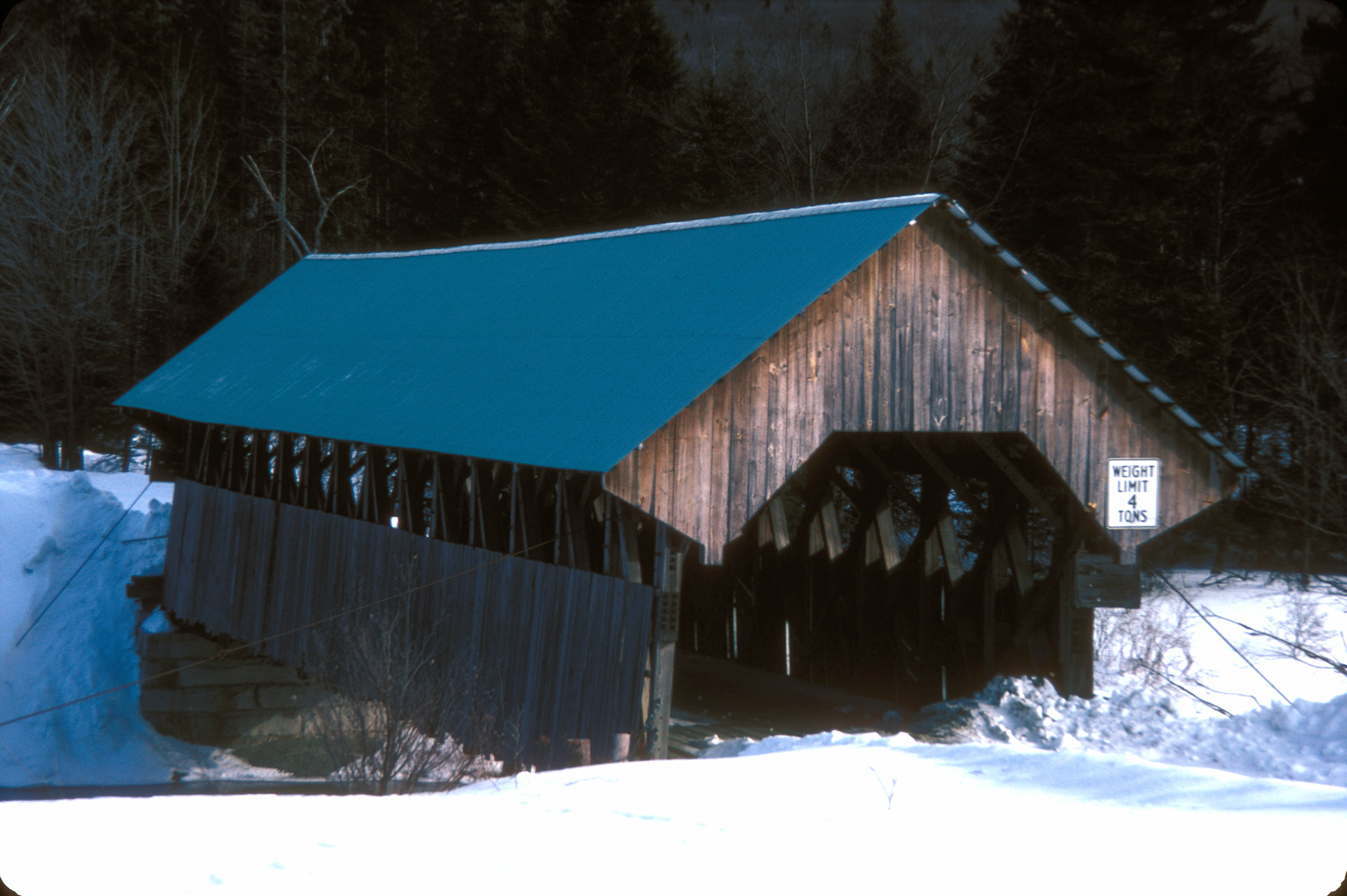
- Bennett Bridge

- Location within Maine Location within the United States
- Coordinates: 44°56′56″N 70°59′46″W
- Country: United States
- State: Maine
- County: Oxford

Area
  - Total: 36.8 sq mi (95.4 km^{2})
  - Land: 32.5 sq mi (84.1 km^{2})
  - Water: 4.4 sq mi (11.3 km^{2})
- Elevation: 1,516 ft (462 m)

Population (2020)
  - Total: 41
  - Density: 1.3/sq mi (0.49/km^{2})
- Time zone: UTC-5 (Eastern (EST))
  - Summer (DST): UTC-4 (EDT)
- ZIP code: 03579
- Area code: 207
- FIPS code: 23-39422
- GNIS feature ID: 582560

Lincoln Plantation is a plantation in Oxford County, Maine, United States. It contains the village of Wilson's Mills. The population was 41 at the 2020 census.

== Geography ==
According to the United States Census Bureau, the plantation has a total area of 36.8 square miles (95.4 km^{2}), of which 32.5 square miles (84.1 km^{2}) is land and 4.4 square miles (11.3 km^{2}) (11.83%) is water. The southern portion of the Aziscohos Lake reservoir is located in the plantation, along with the Aziscohos Dam on the Magalloway River that impounds the reservoir. Lincoln Plantation is also home to Aziscohos Mountain, whose summit sits at an elevation of 3,215 feet (980 m).

== Demographics ==
Historical population
Census	Pop.	Note	%±
1930	90		—
1940	89		−1.1%
1950	71		−20.2%
1960	99		39.4%
1970	60		−39.4%
1980	50		−16.7%
1990	38		−24.0%
2000	46		21.1%
2010	45		−2.2%
2020	41		−8.9%
U.S. Decennial Census

As of the census of 2000, there were 46 people, 24 households, and 19 families residing in the plantation. The population density was 1.4 people per square mile (0.54 people/km^{2}). There were 119 housing units at an average density of 3.7 units per square mile (1.4 units/km^{2}). The racial makeup of the plantation was 100.00% White.

There were 24 households, out of which 4.2% had children under the age of 18 living with them, 66.7% were married couples living together, 4.2% had a female householder with no husband present, and 20.8% were non-families. 20.8% of all households were made up of individuals, and 8.3% had someone living alone who was 65 years of age or older. The average household size was 1.92 and the average family size was 2.11.

In the plantation the population was spread out, with 2.2% under the age of 18, 6.5% from 18 to 24, 8.7% from 25 to 44, 56.5% from 45 to 64, and 26.1% who were 65 years of age or older. The median age was 56 years. For every 100 females, there were 109.1 males. For every 100 females age 18 and over, there were 114.3 males.

The median income for a household in the plantation was $26,750, and the median income for a family was $31,563. Males had a median income of $36,250 versus $12,500 for females. The per capita income for the plantation was $17,376. None of the population and none of the families were below the poverty line.
