= Dead Diamond River =

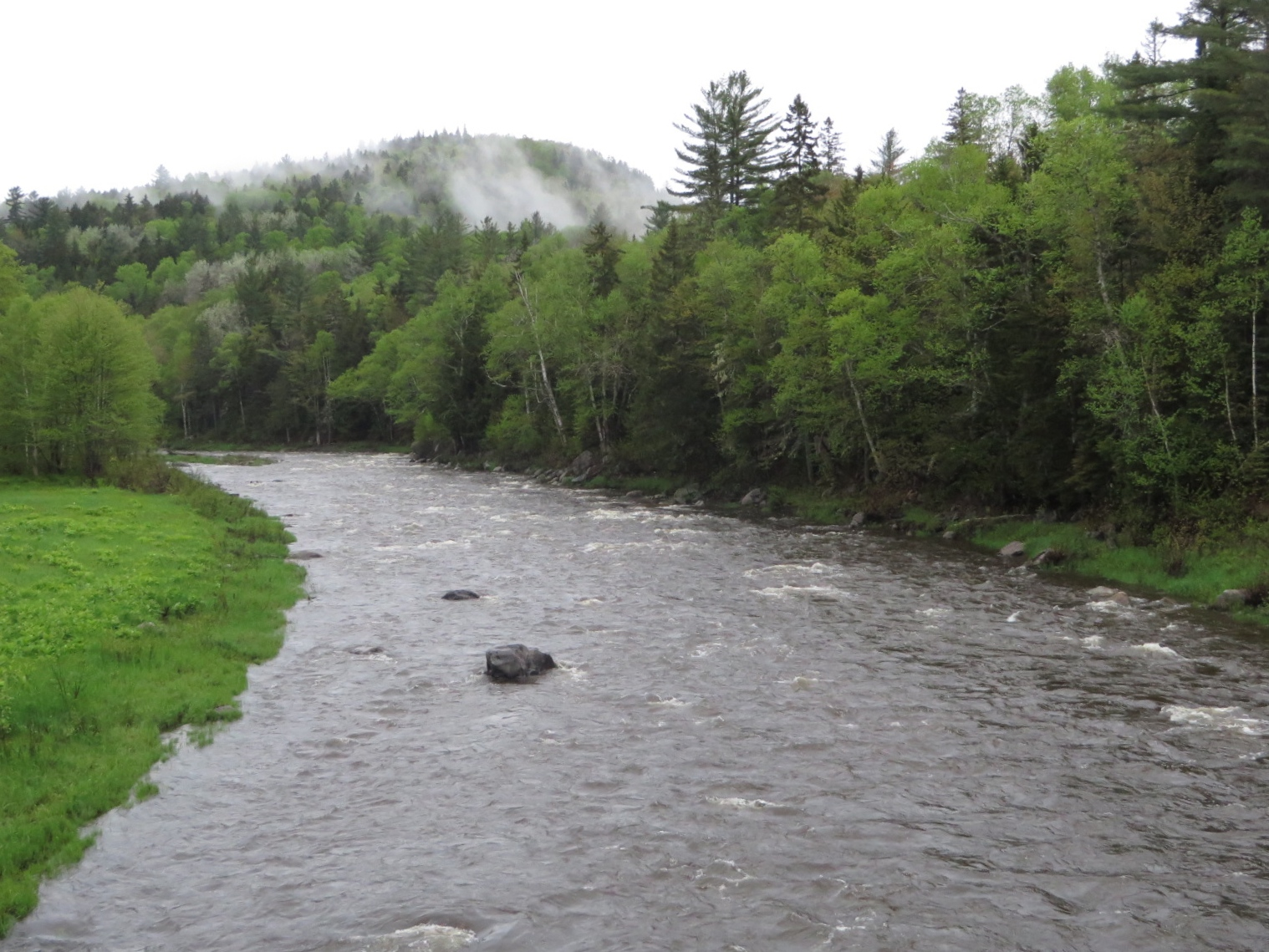
- The Dead Diamond River at Gate Camp, Second College Grant, NH

- Location within New Hampshire Location within the United States

Location
- Country: United States
- State: New Hampshire
- County: Coos
- Townships: Atkinson and Gilmanton Academy Grant, Second College Grant

Physical characteristics
- Source: Confluence of West and East branches
  - location: Atkinson and Gilmanton Academy Grant
  - coordinates: 45°0′9″N 71°8′54″W
  - elevation: 1,435 ft (437 m)
- Mouth: Magalloway River
  - location: Second College Grant
  - coordinates: 44°52′32″N 71°3′0″W
  - elevation: 1,246 ft (380 m)
- Length: 18.7 mi (30.1 km)

Basin features
- Tributaries
  - left: Horne Brook, Washburn Brook, Merrill Brook
  - right: Tracy Brook, Little Dead Diamond River, Lamb Valley Brook, Loomis Valley Brook, Swift Diamond River

The Dead Diamond River is an 18.7-mile-long (30.1 km) river in northern New Hampshire in the United States. Its water enters the Atlantic Ocean on the coast of Maine by passing through the Magalloway, Androscoggin, and Kennebec rivers.

The Dead Diamond River is formed in the township of Atkinson and Gilmanton Academy Grant, New Hampshire by the juncture of the West Branch and the East Branch. The Dead Diamond heads south through logging country, and the Little Dead Diamond River joins from the west at Hell Gate, a set of rapids, just before the Dead Diamond enters the Dartmouth College Grant. The river traverses the length of the college grant before reaching the Magalloway River near the Maine border. The Swift Diamond River is a significant tributary which joins the Dead Diamond shortly upstream of the Magalloway.

== See also ==
- List of rivers of New Hampshire
