= Dixville, New Hampshire =

Township in Coos County, New Hampshire, United States

- Township
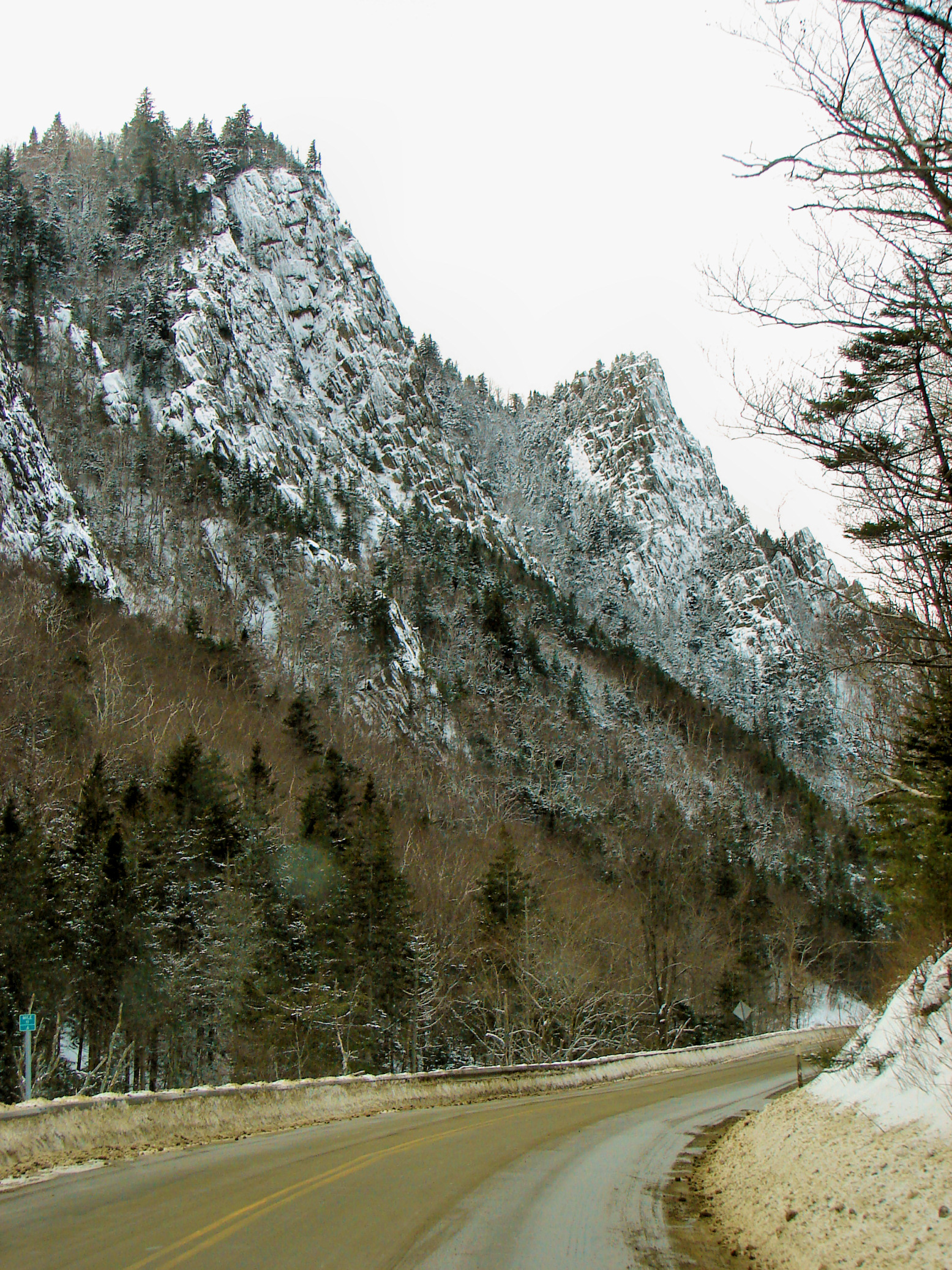
- Dixville Notch in 2012

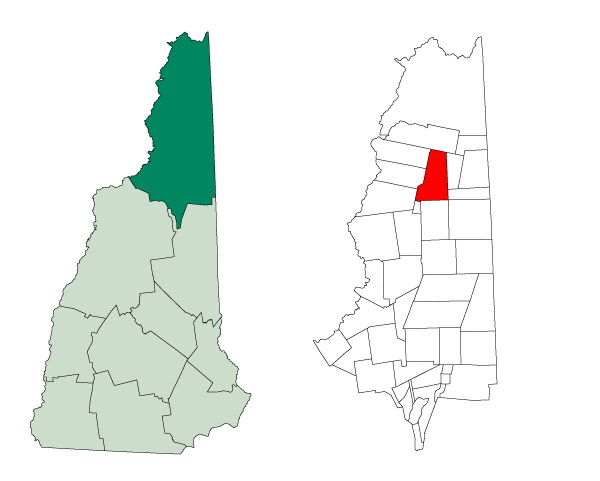
- Location in Coös County, New Hampshire
- Coordinates: 44°53′39″N 71°16′2″W
- Country: United States
- State: New Hampshire
- County: Coös

Area
  - Total: 49.2 sq mi (127.3 km^{2})
  - Land: 49.0 sq mi (126.9 km^{2})
  - Water: 0.15 sq mi (0.4 km^{2}) 0.35%
- Elevation: 2,400 ft (730 m)

Population (2020)
  - Total: 4
  - Density: 0.078/sq mi (0.03/km^{2})
- Time zone: UTC-5 (Eastern)
  - Summer (DST): UTC-4 (Eastern)
- ZIP code: 03576
- Area code: 603
- FIPS code: 33-007-18420
- GNIS feature ID: 871095

Dixville is a township in Coös County, New Hampshire, United States. The population was 4 as of the 2020 census, down from 12 at the 2010 census, and was also estimated to be 4 in 2025. In New Hampshire, locations, grants, townships (which are different from towns), and purchases are unincorporated portions of a county which are not part of any town and have limited self-government (if any, as many are uninhabited).

Dixville is the location of Dixville Notch State Park and The Balsams Grand Resort Hotel. It is part of the Berlin, NH-VT micropolitan statistical area. The village of Dixville Notch, consisting of development around the hotel, lies within the township. Dixville Notch has come to be known as the first place to declare its results in the New Hampshire presidential primary.

== History ==
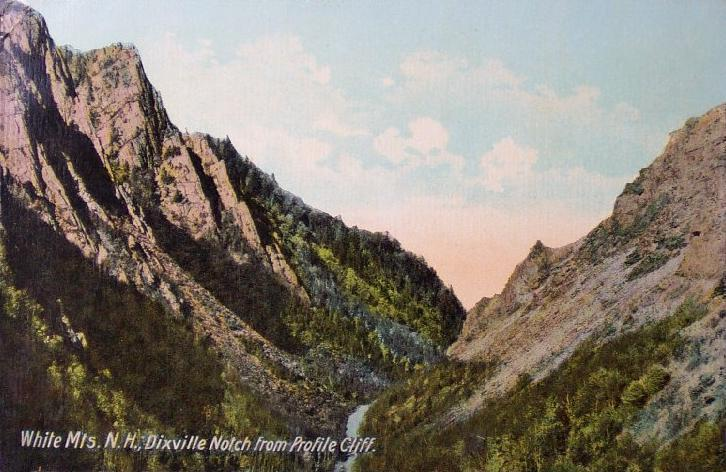
Dixville Notch from Profile Cliff in 1913

Dixville was granted by the legislature to Timothy Dix Jr. in 1805 and contained about 29,340 acres (118.7 km^{2}); the price was $4,500. It was organized for voting purposes in 1960, and the village of Dixville Notch is commonly known as the first place to cast votes in U.S. elections. The original grant included an eastern portion (north of Wentworth Location) now known separately as Dix's Grant.

== Geography ==
According to the United States Census Bureau, the township has a total area of 49.2 square miles (127.3 km^{2}), of which 49.0 square miles (126.9 km^{2}) are land and 0.2 square miles (0.4 km^{2}), or 0.35%, are water. Dixville Notch is in the southwest part of the township. With an elevation of 1,887 feet (575 m) above sea level, it is the height of land between west-flowing tributaries of the Connecticut River and east-flowing tributaries of the Androscoggin River. The notch lies within Dixville Notch State Park. (The term "notch" is the local equivalent of "pass" or "gap", and refers to a low place between mountains or mountain ranges.) Nearby Dixville Peak, at 3,482 feet (1,061 m), is the highest point in the township.

New Hampshire Route 26 crosses the township, passing through Dixville Notch. The highway leads west to Colebrook on the Connecticut River and southeast to Errol on the Androscoggin.

=== Adjacent municipalities ===
- Clarksville (north)
- Dix's Grant (east)
- Wentworth Location (southeast)
- Errol (southeast)
- Millsfield (south)
- Erving's Location (southwest)
- Columbia (southwest)
- Colebrook (west)
- Stewartstown (northwest)

== Demographics ==
Historical population
Census	Pop.	Note	%±
1810	12		—
1820	2		−83.3%
1830	2		0.0%
1840	4		100.0%
1870	8		—
1880	32		300.0%
1890	11		−65.6%
1900	15		36.4%
1910	12		−20.0%
1920	24		100.0%
1930	25		4.2%
1940	13		−48.0%
1950	13		0.0%
1960	18		38.5%
1970	18		0.0%
1980	36		100.0%
1990	50		38.9%
2000	75		50.0%
2010	12		−84.0%
2020	4		−66.7%
U.S. Decennial Census

As of the 2000 census, there were 75 people, 10 households, and 10 families residing in the township. The population density was 1.5 inhabitants per square mile (0.58/km^{2}). There were 36 housing units at an average density of 0.7 per square mile (0.27/km^{2}). The racial makeup of the township was 98.67% White.

There were 10 households, all composed of married couples living together, and 40.0% of which had children under the age of 18 living with them. No households were made up of individuals. The average household and family size was 2.80.

In the township the population was spread out, with 9.3% under the age of 18, 1.3% from 18 to 24, 16.0% from 25 to 44, 8.0% from 45 to 64, and 65.3% who were 65 years of age or older. The median age was 76 years. For every 100 females, there were 74.4 males. For every 100 females age 18 and over, there were 61.9 males.

== See also ==
- New Hampshire presidential primary
