= Atkinson and Gilmanton Academy Grant, New Hampshire =

Township in Coos County, New Hampshire, United States

- Township
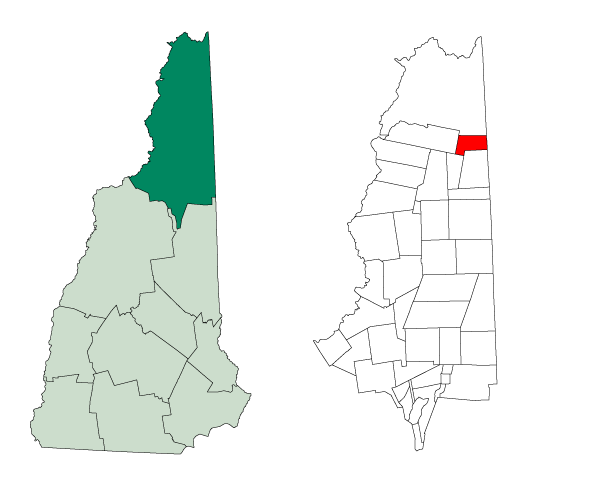
- Location in Coös County, New Hampshire
- Coordinates: 44°59′34″N 71°7′1″W
- Country: United States
- State: New Hampshire
- County: Coös

Area
  - Total: 19.3 sq mi (50.0 km^{2})
  - Land: 19.2 sq mi (49.7 km^{2})
  - Water: 0.12 sq mi (0.3 km^{2}) 0.57%
- Elevation: 1,605 ft (489 m)

Population (2020)
  - Total: 0
  - Density: 0/sq mi (0/km^{2})
- Time zone: UTC-5 (Eastern)
  - Summer (DST): UTC-4 (Eastern)
- Area code: 603
- FIPS code: 33-007-02420
- GNIS feature ID: 871100

Atkinson and Gilmanton Academy Grant is a township in Coös County, New Hampshire, United States. It was granted by the state legislature to Gilmanton Academy and Atkinson Academy in equal shares in 1809 and contained approximately 19,000 acres (77 km^{2}). It was later expanded by annexation of previously ungranted land to the west. The population was zero at both the 2020 census and the estimated population in 2025. It is part of the Berlin, NH-VT Micropolitan Statistical Area.

In New Hampshire, locations, grants, townships (which are different from towns), and purchases are unincorporated portions of a county which are not part of any town and have limited self-government (if any, as many are uninhabited).

== Geography ==
According to the United States Census Bureau, the grant has a total area of 19.3 square miles (50.0 km^{2}), of which 19.2 square miles (49.7 km^{2}) are land and 0.12 square miles (0.3 km^{2}) or 0.57%, is covered by water. The township is drained by the Dead Diamond River and its branches, except for the eastern edge of the township, which is drained by Abbott Brook. Both waterways are tributaries of the Magalloway River and part of the Androscoggin River watershed. The highest point is an unnamed ridge that reaches 2,620 feet (800 m) above sea level near the grant's southwestern corner. The township is bordered to the east by the state of Maine.

The grant boundaries shown in 1874 maps differ from those of 1850s maps by showing a parcel of ungranted "state land" on the western edge of this grant (and north of Dix's Grant), and another "Dartmouth College Grant" to the west of that (later annexed to the eastern edge of Clarksville).

=== Adjacent municipalities ===
- Pittsburg (north)
- North Oxford, Maine (northeast)
- Lincoln Plantation, Maine (southeast)
- Second College Grant (south)
- Dix's Grant (southwest)
- Clarksville (west)

== Demographics ==
Historical population
| Census | Pop. | Note | %± |
|---|---|---|---|
| 1910 | 1 | | — |
| 1920 | 20 | | 1,900.0% |
| 1930 | 1 | | −95.0% |
| 1940 | 0 | | −100.0% |
| 1950 | 0 | | — |
| 1960 | 0 | | — |
| 1970 | 4 | | — |
| 1980 | 0 | | −100.0% |
| 1990 | 0 | | — |
| 2000 | 12 | | — |
| 2010 | 0 | | −100.0% |
| 2020 | 0 | | — |
U.S. Decennial Census

As of the 2020 census, there were no people living in the township.
