= Clarksville, New Hampshire =

- Town
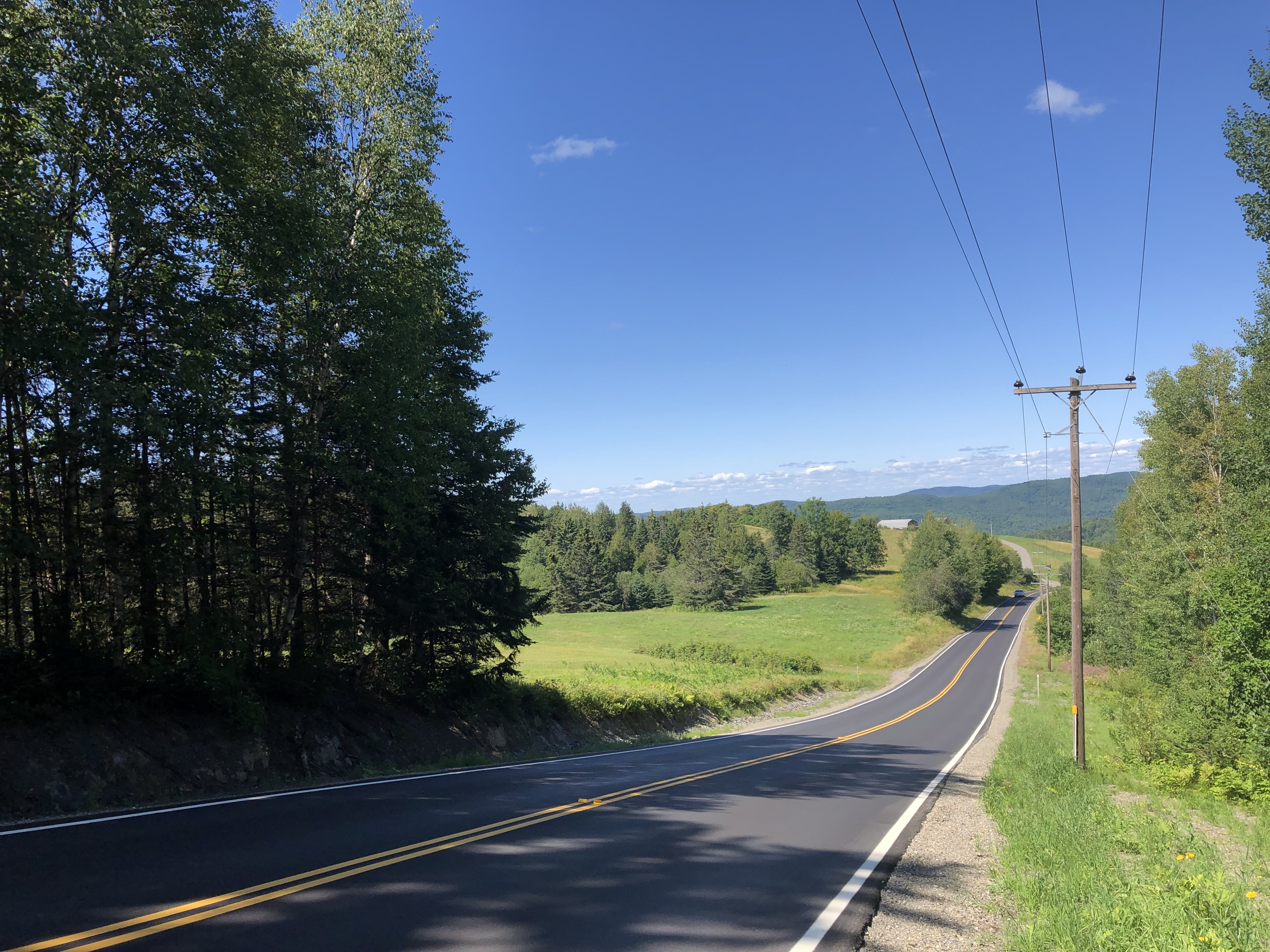
- NH 145, looking north in Clarksville

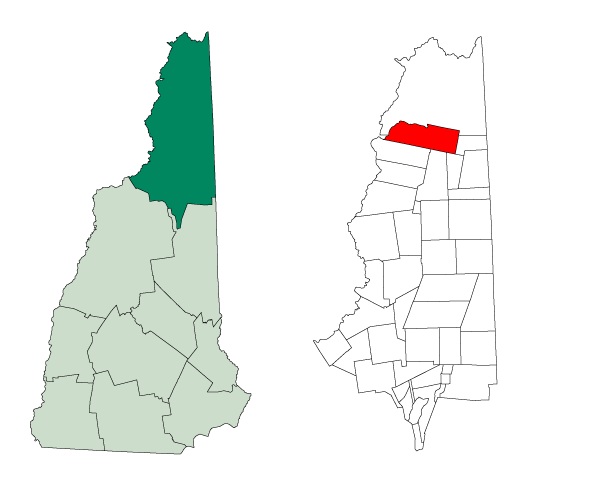
- Location in Coös County, New Hampshire
- Coordinates: 45°00′30″N 71°18′50″W
- Country: United States
- State: New Hampshire
- County: Coös
- Incorporated: 1853

Area
  - Total: 62.4 sq mi (161.5 km^{2})
  - Land: 60.3 sq mi (156.3 km^{2})
  - Water: 2.0 sq mi (5.2 km^{2}) 3.24%
- Elevation: 1,834 ft (559 m)

Population (2020)
  - Total: 294
  - Density: 4.9/sq mi (1.9/km^{2})
- Time zone: UTC-5 (Eastern)
  - Summer (DST): UTC-4 (Eastern)
- ZIP code: 03592
- Area code: 603
- FIPS code: 33-13220
- GNIS feature ID: 871098

Clarksville is a town in northern Coös County, New Hampshire, United States. The population was 294 at the 2020 census, and an estimated 284 in 2025. It is part of the Berlin, NH-VT Micropolitan Statistical Area.

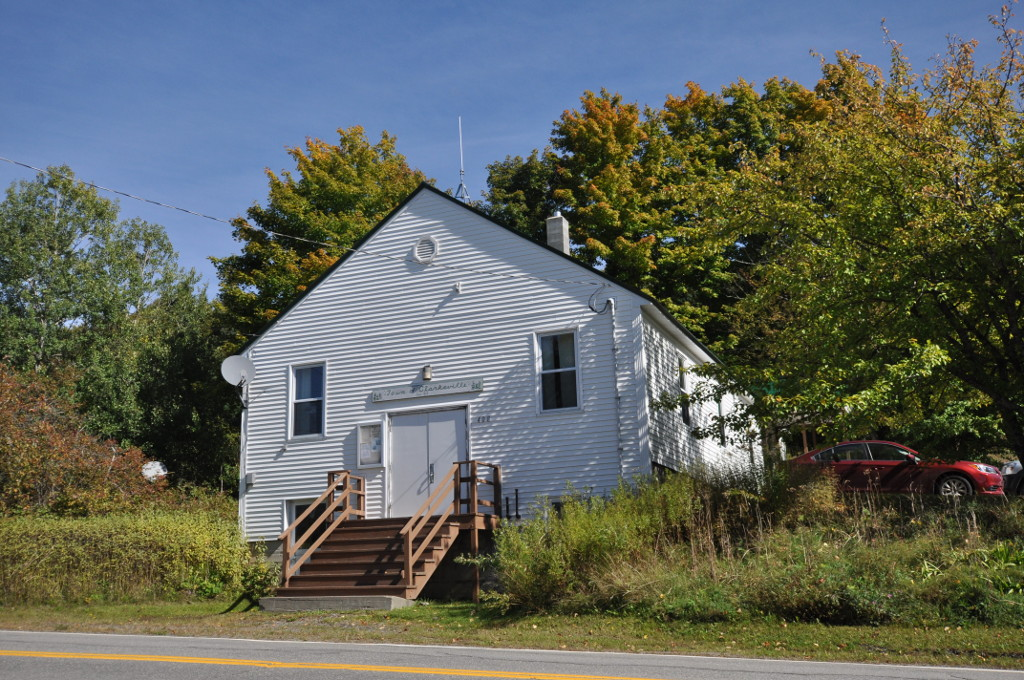
Town hall

== History ==
The area was originally known as "Dartmouth College Grant" and was part of a tract granted to Dartmouth College; sections were sold off by the college to raise money. It was purchased by Benjamin Clark of Boston and Joseph Murdock of Norwich, Vermont. The first census taken was in 1830, at which time there were 88 residents. It was incorporated in 1853, and renamed Clarksville in 1872 for the Clark family.

In the late 19th century, major industries included starch and maple sugar. Logging companies have been the primary employers in town for many years.

== Geography ==
Clarksville is bordered to the north and west by Pittsburg, and to the west by one mile of waterfront on the Connecticut River (across from the village of Beecher Falls, in the town of Canaan, Vermont). The 45th parallel north passes through the town.

New Hampshire Route 145 traverses the western end of the township, running south from Pittsburg village into Stewartstown. Prior to the construction of U.S. Route 3 along the Connecticut River, this was the only road north to Pittsburg.

According to the United States Census Bureau, the town has a total area of 62.4 square miles (161.5 km^{2}), of which 60.3 square miles (156.3 km^{2}) are land and 2.0 square miles (5.2 km^{2}) are water, comprising 3.24% of the town. The highest point in Clarksville is Crystal Mountain, at 3,230 feet (980 m) above sea level, near the town's southern border. Significant water bodies include portions of Lake Francis, Clarksville Pond, Carr Pond and Dead Water Stream. The western two-thirds of Clarksville lies within the Connecticut River watershed and the eastern third in the Androscoggin River watershed. Clarksville's town hall, elevation 1,980 feet (600 m), is the highest town hall in the state. (The town hall of Washington is located at a lower elevation—1,507 feet (459 m)—but has other village development there, and is therefore the highest town center in the state.)

== Demographics ==
Historical population
Census	Pop.	Note	%±
1840	88		—
1850	187		112.5%
1860	249		33.2%
1870	269		8.0%
1880	328		21.9%
1890	325		−0.9%
1900	307		−5.5%
1910	271		−11.7%
1920	410		51.3%
1930	215		−47.6%
1940	225		4.7%
1950	171		−24.0%
1960	179		4.7%
1970	166		−7.3%
1980	262		57.8%
1990	232		−11.5%
2000	294		26.7%
2010	265		−9.9%
2020	294		10.9%
U.S. Decennial Census

At the 2000 census (and again, informally, in 2004), there were 294 people, 118 households and 88 families living in the town. The population density was 4.9 per square mile (1.9/km^{2}). There were 307 housing units at an average density of 5.1 per square mile (2.0/km^{2}). The racial makeup of the town was 95.92% White (i.e., all but 12), none African American, 1.02% Native American, none Asian, none Pacific Islander, none from other races, and 3.06% from two or more races. Hispanic or Latino people of any race were 1.70% of the population.

There were 118 households, of which 30.5% had children under the age of 18 living with them, 66.9% were married couples living together, 2.5% had a female householder with no husband present, and 25.4% were non-families. 19.5% of all households were made up of individuals, and 5.9% had someone living alone who was 65 years of age or older. The average household size was 2.47 and the average family size was 2.80.

22.8% of the population were under the age of 18, 4.1% from 18 to 24, 23.5% from 25 to 44, 38.1% from 45 to 64, and 11.6% who were 65 years of age or older. The median age was 44 years. For every 100 females, there were 111.5 males. For every 100 females age 18 and over, there were 102.7 males.

The median household income was $40,179 and the median family income was $44,688. Males had a median income of $32,750 compared with $21,111 for females. The per capita income for the town was $18,090. About 5.4% of families and 3.7% of the population were below the poverty line, including none of those under the age of eighteen and 8.7% of those sixty-five or over.

== Adjacent municipalities ==
- Pittsburg (north)
- Atkinson and Gilmanton Academy Grant (east)
- Dix's Grant (southeast)
- Dixville (south)
- Stewartstown (southwest)
- Canaan, Vermont (west)

== See also ==
- New Hampshire Historical Marker No. 115: 45th Parallel
