= Coös County, New Hampshire =

County in New Hampshire, United States

- County
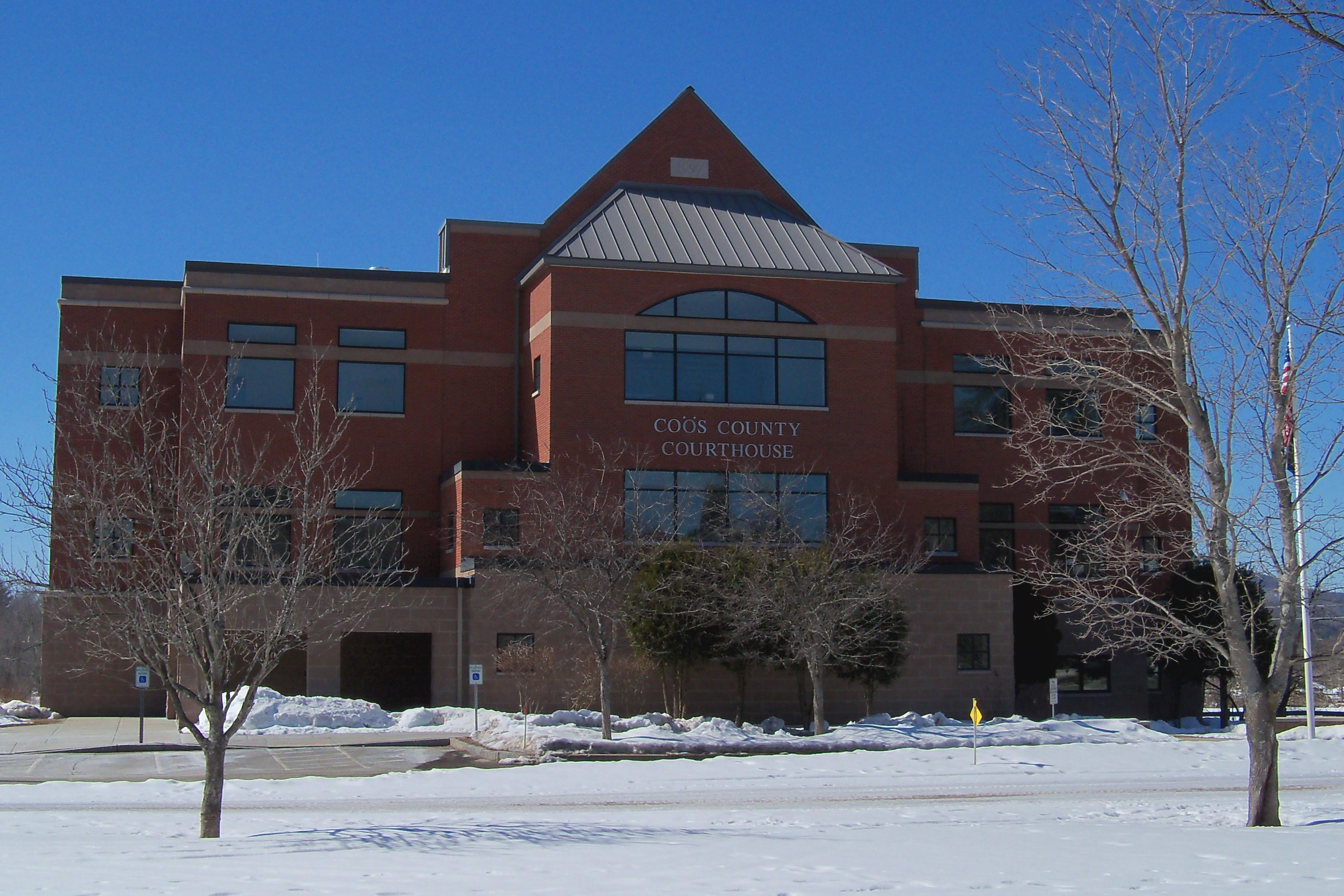
- Coös County Courthouse in Lancaster

- Seal

- Location within the U.S. state of New Hampshire
- Coordinates: 44°36′50″N 71°20′24″W
- Country: United States
- State: New Hampshire
- Founded: 1803
- Named for: Algonquian for "small pines"
- Seat: Lancaster
- Largest city: Berlin

Area
  - Total: 1,830.3 sq mi (4,740 km^{2})
  - Land: 1,794.6 sq mi (4,648 km^{2})
  - Water: 35.7 sq mi (92 km^{2}) 1.95%

Population (2020)
  - Total: 31,268
  - Estimate (2025): 31,343 ▲
  - Density: 17.4/sq mi (6.7/km^{2})
- Time zone: UTC−5 (Eastern)
  - Summer (DST): UTC−4 (EDT)
- Congressional district: 2nd
- Website: www.cooscountynh.gov

Coös County or Coos County (/ˈkoʊ.ɒs/, KOH-oss) is the northernmost county in the U.S. state of New Hampshire. As of the 2020 census, the population was 31,268, making it the least-populated county in the state. The county seat is Lancaster.

Coös County is part of the Berlin, NH–VT Micropolitan Statistical Area. It is the only New Hampshire county on the Canada–United States border, south of the province of Quebec, and thus is home to New Hampshire's only international port of entry, the Pittsburg–Chartierville Border Crossing. The only city in Coös County is Berlin, with the rest of the communities being towns, or unincorporated townships, gores and grants.

Major industries in Coös County include forestry and tourism, with the once-dominant paper-making industry in sharp decline. The county straddles two of the state's tourism regions. The southernmost portion of the county is part of the White Mountains Region and is home to Mount Washington. The remainder of the county is known as the Great North Woods Region, or known locally as the North Country.

== Toponymy ==
The name Coös, the diaeresis indicating a disyllable, derives from a Cowasuck word meaning "small pines". The county government sometimes respects the diaeresis but sometimes omits it, using it on only some of its vehicles, for example. The Lancaster-based weekly newspaper The Coös County Democrat is one of the local businesses that remains loyal to the traditional spelling.

== History ==
Coös County was separated from the northern part of Grafton County, New Hampshire, on December 24, 1803, with its Superior Court established in Lancaster.

During the American Revolutionary War, two units of troops of the Continental Army — Bedel's Regiment and Whitcomb's Rangers — were raised from the settlers of Coös. From the Treaty of Paris of 1783 until 1835, the boundaries in the northern tip of the county (and New Hampshire itself) were disputed with Lower Canada (which was soon to become part of the Province of Canada), and for some years residents of the area formed the independent Republic of Indian Stream.

In the 1810 census, there were 3,991 residents, and by 1870 there were nearly 15,000, at which point the entire county was valued at just under $5 million, with farm productivity per acre comparing favorably with that of contemporary Illinois. Other early industries included forestry and manufacturing, using 4,450 water horsepower in 1870.

== Geography ==
According to the United States Census Bureau, the county has a total area of 1,830 square miles (4,700 km^{2}), of which 1,795 square miles (4,650 km^{2}) is land and 35 square miles (91 km^{2}) (1.9%) is water. It is the largest county in New Hampshire by area, and borders both Vermont and Maine, as well as Canada.

Much of its mountainous area is reserved as national forest, wilderness, state parks and other public areas; these encompass most of the northern portion of the White Mountains, including all the named summits of the Presidential Range (though one, Mt. Webster, lies about 200 feet (61 m) from the county line). Mt. Washington's peak is the highest in the Northeast. The 162-mile (261 km) Cohos Trail runs the length of the county.

The principal state highways in Coös County are New Hampshire Route 16, which runs mostly parallel to the Maine state line and through the city of Berlin, and New Hampshire Route 26, which traverses the Great North Woods from Vermont Route 102 southeast to Maine Route 26 towards Portland. The two major U.S. Highways are U.S. Route 2, which roughly bisects the county from Lancaster to the Oxford County line, and U.S. Route 3, which runs from Carroll in the south to the Pittsburg–Chartierville Border Crossing, where it continues as Quebec Route 257.

Coös County is the least populated of all New Hampshire counties, and the only one with significant amounts of unincorporated land; over half of the municipal-like entities are unincorporated townships, gores, or grants, a rarity in New Hampshire, where nearly all of the land is incorporated as towns or cities. The population of these unincorporated territories is minuscule; collectively they account for less than 1% of the population of the county, with only three (Wentworth Location, Millsfield, and Cambridge) reporting populations in the double digits for recent censuses. Approximately 1/3 of the population lives in Berlin, the only city, most populous municipality, and economic hub. Lancaster serves as the county seat.

=== Mountains ===
- White Mountains (in the White Mountain National Forest)
- Presidential Range

=== Adjacent counties ===
- Oxford County, Maine (east)
- Carroll County (southeast)
- Grafton County (southwest)
- Essex County, Vermont (west)
- Coaticook Regional County Municipality, Quebec, Canada (north)
- Le Haut-Saint-François Regional County Municipality, Quebec, Canada (north)
- Le Granit Regional County Municipality, Quebec, Canada (north)

=== National protected areas ===
- Umbagog National Wildlife Refuge (part)
- Silvio O. Conte National Fish and Wildlife Refuge (part)
- White Mountain National Forest (part)

== Demographics ==
Historical population
Census	Pop.	Note	%±
1810	3,991		—
1820	5,549		39.0%
1830	8,388		51.2%
1840	9,849		17.4%
1850	11,853		20.3%
1860	13,161		11.0%
1870	14,932		13.5%
1880	18,580		24.4%
1890	23,211		24.9%
1900	29,468		27.0%
1910	30,753		4.4%
1920	36,093		17.4%
1930	38,959		7.9%
1940	39,274		0.8%
1950	35,932		−8.5%
1960	37,140		3.4%
1970	34,291		−7.7%
1980	35,147		2.5%
1990	34,828		−0.9%
2000	33,111		−4.9%
2010	33,055		−0.2%
2020	31,268		−5.4%
2025 (est.)	31,343	▲	0.2%
U.S. Decennial Census; 1790-1960 1900-1990; 1990-2000 2010-2020

=== 2020 census ===
As of the 2020 census, the county had a population of 31,268. The median age was 50.4 years. 16.3% of residents were under the age of 18 and 26.1% of residents were 65 years of age or older. For every 100 females there were 103.1 males, and for every 100 females age 18 and over there were 102.2 males age 18 and over.

The racial makeup of the county was 92.6% White, 1.7% Black or African American, 0.3% American Indian and Alaska Native, 0.6% Asian, 0.0% Native Hawaiian and Pacific Islander, 0.5% from some other race, and 4.3% from two or more races. Hispanic or Latino residents of any race comprised 2.1% of the population.

30.9% of residents lived in urban areas, while 69.1% lived in rural areas.

There were 13,908 households in the county, of which 21.0% had children under the age of 18 living with them and 24.7% had a female householder with no spouse or partner present. About 32.8% of all households were made up of individuals and 16.0% had someone living alone who was 65 years of age or older.

There were 20,444 housing units, of which 32.0% were vacant. Among occupied housing units, 71.6% were owner-occupied and 28.4% were renter-occupied. The homeowner vacancy rate was 2.6% and the rental vacancy rate was 10.2%.

Coös County, New Hampshire – Racial and ethnic composition Note: the US Census treats Hispanic/Latino as an ethnic category. This table excludes Latinos from the racial categories and assigns them to a separate category. Hispanics/Latinos may be of any race.
Race / Ethnicity (NH = Non-Hispanic)	Pop 2000	Pop 2010	Pop 2020	% 2000	% 2010	% 2020
White alone (NH)	32,337	31,801	28,629	97.66%	96.20%	91.56%
Black or African American alone (NH)	36	141	494	0.10%	0.42%	1.57%
Native American or Alaska Native alone (NH)	88	107	84	0.26%	0.32%	0.26%
Asian alone (NH)	122	165	193	0.36%	0.49%	0.61%
Pacific Islander alone (NH)	1	1	3	0.00%	0.00%	0.00%
Other race alone (NH)	13	22	71	0.03%	0.06%	0.22%
Mixed race or Multiracial (NH)	313	417	1,122	0.94%	1.26%	3.58%
Hispanic or Latino (any race)	201	401	672	0.60%	1.21%	2.14%
Total	33,111	33,055	31,268	100.00%	100.00%	100.00%

=== 2010 census ===
As of the census of 2010, there were 33,055 people, 14,171 households, and 8,879 families residing in the county. The population density was 18.4 inhabitants per square mile (7.1/km^{2}). There were 21,321 housing units at an average density of 11.9 per square mile (4.6/km^{2}). The racial makeup of the county was 96.9% white, 0.5% Asian, 0.4% American Indian, 0.4% black or African American, 0.3% from other races, and 1.4% from two or more races. Those of Hispanic or Latino origin made up 1.2% of the population.

Of the 14,171 households, 25.3% had children under the age of 18 living with them, 48.5% were married couples living together, 9.2% had a female householder with no husband present, 37.3% were non-families, and 30.3% of all households were made up of individuals. The average household size was 2.23 and the average family size was 2.72. The median age was 46.4 years.

18.9% of the population were under the age of 18, 6.7% were from age 18 to 24, 22.1% were from 25 to 44, 32.9% were from 45 to 64, and 19.4% were age 65 or older. The median age was 46.4 years. For every 100 females there were 103.4 males, and for every 100 females age 18 and older, there were 101.8 males.

During the period 2011–2015, the largest self-reported ancestry groups in the county were 39.3% French or French Canadian, 16.9% Irish, 14.2% English, 7.2% "American", 5.5% Italian, 4.9% German, and 3.6% Scottish.

During 2011–2015, the estimated median annual income for a household in the county was $42,312, and the median income for a family was $55,385. Male full-time workers had a median income of $41,934 versus $34,859 for females. The per capita income for the county was $24,546. About 9.9% of families and 14.1% of the population were below the poverty line, including 21.7% of those under age 18 and 8.2% of those age 65 or over.

== Politics and government ==
Coös County has supported the winner of the presidential election (at the national level) in all but three elections since 1892. The exceptions were 1968, 2004, and 2020, when it supported Hubert Humphrey over Richard Nixon, John Kerry over George W. Bush, and Donald Trump over Joe Biden, respectively.

United States presidential election results for Coös County, New Hampshire
Year	Republican		Democratic		Third party(ies)	
Year	No.	%	No.	%	No.	%
1876	1,679	43.72%	2,130	55.47%	31	0.81%
1880	1,829	42.89%	2,387	55.98%	48	1.13%
1884	1,987	44.44%	2,394	53.55%	90	2.01%
1888	2,297	45.27%	2,729	53.78%	48	0.95%
1892	2,419	47.36%	2,639	51.66%	50	0.98%
1896	3,253	66.01%	1,489	30.22%	186	3.77%
1900	3,383	57.40%	2,436	41.33%	75	1.27%
1904	3,343	59.07%	2,241	39.60%	75	1.33%
1908	3,294	58.34%	2,216	39.25%	136	2.41%
1912	1,938	35.23%	2,229	40.52%	1,334	24.25%
1916	2,762	44.22%	3,247	51.99%	237	3.79%
1920	6,114	54.45%	4,985	44.40%	129	1.15%
1924	6,137	52.67%	4,620	39.65%	894	7.67%
1928	7,891	56.64%	6,006	43.11%	34	0.24%
1932	7,189	47.28%	7,928	52.14%	88	0.58%
1936	6,737	42.93%	8,737	55.67%	220	1.40%
1940	6,650	39.70%	10,100	60.30%	0	0.00%
1944	6,209	41.61%	8,709	58.36%	4	0.03%
1948	7,005	46.19%	7,930	52.29%	230	1.52%
1952	9,975	55.97%	7,848	44.03%	0	0.00%
1956	11,465	66.13%	5,871	33.86%	2	0.01%
1960	7,797	42.72%	10,455	57.28%	0	0.00%
1964	4,863	28.91%	11,956	71.09%	0	0.00%
1968	6,822	44.02%	8,261	53.31%	414	2.67%
1972	9,468	60.84%	5,829	37.45%	266	1.71%
1976	7,094	48.46%	7,385	50.45%	159	1.09%
1980	8,724	60.08%	4,749	32.71%	1,047	7.21%
1984	10,013	71.23%	4,004	28.48%	40	0.28%
1988	8,763	63.32%	4,981	35.99%	96	0.69%
1992	5,271	33.35%	6,559	41.50%	3,974	25.15%
1996	4,703	33.27%	7,191	50.87%	2,243	15.87%
2000	7,329	50.20%	6,570	45.00%	701	4.80%
2004	8,143	48.11%	8,585	50.72%	197	1.16%
2008	6,558	40.11%	9,532	58.31%	258	1.58%
2012	6,342	40.40%	9,095	57.93%	262	1.67%
2016	7,952	50.89%	6,563	42.00%	1,112	7.12%
2020	8,617	52.09%	7,640	46.18%	287	1.73%
2024	9,734	56.19%	7,367	42.53%	221	1.28%

=== County Commission ===
The executive power of Coös County's government is held by three county commissioners, each representing one of the three commissioner districts within the county.

District	Commissioner	Hometown	Party
1	Robert Theberge	Berlin	Republican
2	Thomas Brady	Jefferson	Republican
3	Raymond Gorman	Colebrook	Republican

In addition to the County Commission, there are five directly elected officials: they include County Attorney, Register of Deeds, County Sheriff, Register of Probate, and County Treasurer.

Office	Name
County Attorney	John McCormick (D)
Register of Deeds	Leon Rideout (R)
County Sheriff	Brian Valerino (I)
Register of Probate	Terri Peterson (R)
County Treasurer	Suzanne Collins (R)

=== New Hampshire General Court ===
Coös County sends members to the New Hampshire House of Representatives for seven districts (districts are numbered within each county), and are represented by nine representatives (the New Hampshire House of Representatives has both single-member and multiple-member districts).

After the 2024 elections, the party distribution of representatives was as follows:

Affiliation	Members	Voting share
Democratic Party	0	0%
Republican Party	9	100%
Total	9	100%

== Media ==
=== Radio ===
- WMOU - 1230 AM, Berlin - Nostalgia
- WOTX - 93.7 FM, Groveton - Classic rock - "The Outlaw"
- WHOM - 94.9 FM, Mount Washington - Soft Adult Contemporary - "America's Superstation" (serves Portland, Maine; broadcasts from Mount Washington)
- W238BP - 95.3 FM, Berlin - Hot Adult Contemporary - "Magic 104" - Rebroadcast of WVMJ, North Conway
- W251BD - 98.1 FM, Berlin - Hot Adult Contemporary - "Magic 104" - Rebroadcast of WVMJ, North Conway
- WYKC - 99.1 FM, Jefferson - Contemporary Christian - "K-LOVE"
- WXXS - 102.3 FM, Lancaster - Top 40- "Kiss 102.3"
- WPKQ - 103.7 FM, North Conway - (broadcasts from Mount Washington)
- WEVC - 107.1 FM, Gorham - New Hampshire Public Radio

(Compiled from Radiostationworld.com)

Some stations from nearby Sherbrooke can also be received in Coös County, the strongest being CITE-FM-1 102.7 FM. For details of stations, see Template:Sherbrooke Radio.

=== Television ===
- W34DQ-D - Pittsburg - Channel 34, rebroadcast of New Hampshire Public Television (NHPTV)
- W27BL - Berlin - Channel 27, rebroadcast of WMUR-TV (ABC)

Coös County is part of the Portland-Auburn DMA. Cable companies carry local market stations WPFO (Fox), WMTW (ABC), WGME (CBS), and WCSH (NBC), plus NHPTV, WMUR and select stations from the Burlington / Plattsburgh market. Sherbrooke stations CKSH-DT (Ici Radio-Canada Télé) and CHLT-DT (TVA), as well as Montreal station CBMT-DT (CBC) are also available, though reception and/or cable carriage may vary by location.

=== Newspapers ===
- The Colebrook Chronicle - Weekly published Fridays from Colebrook, circulation 6,000. Also produces weekly Video New of the Week embedded at website
- The Coös County Democrat - Weekly published Wednesdays from Lancaster
- The Berlin Daily Sun
- The News and Sentinel - Weekly in Colebrook. Publication ceased in 2024.
- The Berlin Reporter - Weekly published Wednesdays from Berlin. Publication ceased in 2024.
- Great Northwoods Journal - Weekly from Lancaster, publication ceased January 2013
- The North Woods Weekly - Weekly from Lancaster, published by The News and Sentinel. Publication ceased in 2020.

== Communities ==
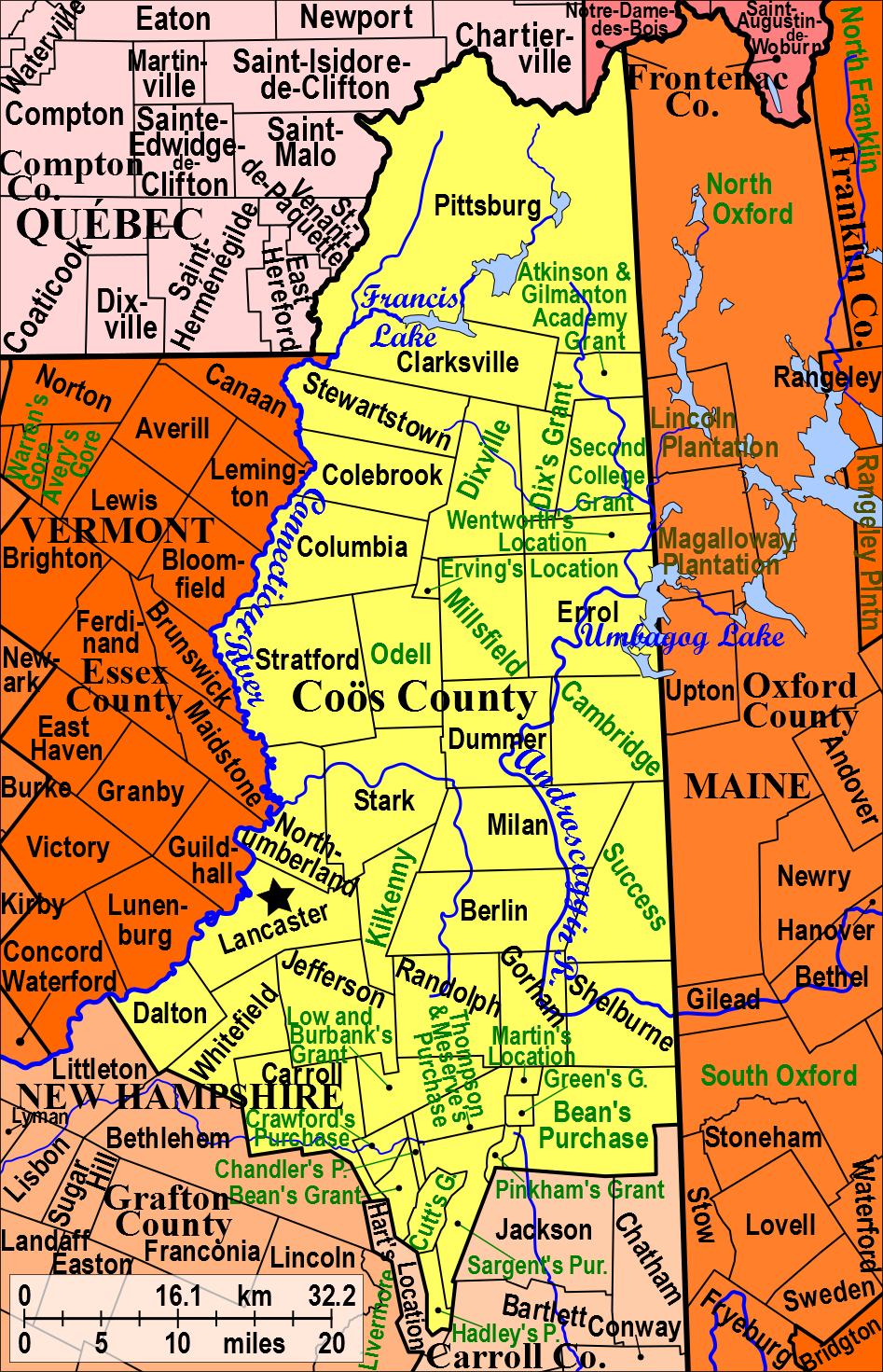
Modern town borders in Coös County, New Hampshire. Cities and towns are named in black and have town records. Green places are unincorporated, and do not keep records.

=== City ===
- Berlin

=== Towns ===
- Carroll
- Clarksville
- Colebrook
- Columbia
- Dalton
- Dummer
- Errol
- Gorham
- Jefferson
- Lancaster (county seat)
- Milan
- Northumberland
- Pittsburg
- Randolph
- Shelburne
- Stark
- Stewartstown
- Stratford
- Whitefield

=== Townships ===
Numbers in parentheses indicate each township's population per the 2020 census.

- Atkinson and Gilmanton Academy Grant (0)
- Bean's Grant (0)
- Bean's Purchase (0)
- Cambridge (16)
- Chandler's Purchase (0)
- Crawford's Purchase (0)
- Cutt's Grant (0)
- Dix's Grant (0)
- Dixville (4)
- Erving's Location (0)
- Green's Grant (0)
- Hadley's Purchase (0)
- Kilkenny (0)
- Low and Burbank's Grant (0)
- Martin's Location (2)
- Millsfield (25)
- Odell (1)
- Pinkham's Grant (0)
- Sargent's Purchase (0)
- Second College Grant (1)
- Success (4)
- Thompson and Meserve's Purchase (1)
- Wentworth Location (28)

=== Census-designated places ===
- Colebrook
- Gorham
- Groveton
- Lancaster
- West Stewartstown
- Whitefield

=== Villages ===
- Beatties
- Bretton Woods
- Cascade
- Dixville Notch
- Hazen
- North Stratford
- Paris
- Tinkerville
- Twin Mountain

== In popular culture ==
Robert Frost, who once lived in Franconia in neighboring Grafton County, wrote the poem "The Witch of Coös".

Coös County is the setting for the John Irving novel Last Night in Twisted River, Twisted River being a logging settlement in the county.

== See also ==
- National Register of Historic Places listings in Coös County, New Hampshire
