= Pawtuckaway Lake =

Lake in New Hampshire, United States

- Pawtuckaway Pond
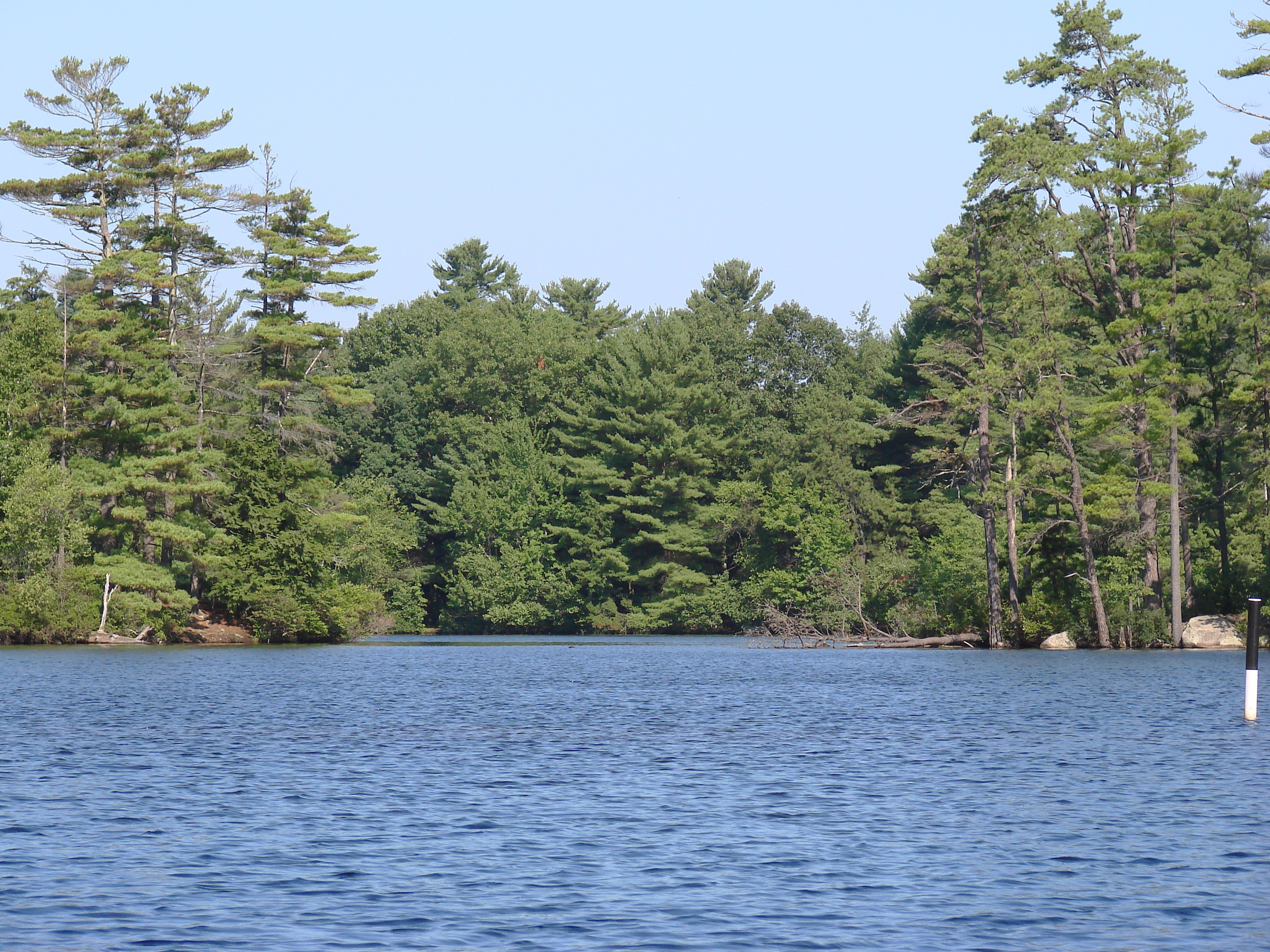

- Location within New Hampshire Location within the United States
- Location: Rockingham County, New Hampshire
- Coordinates: 43°5′20″N 71°8′19″W
- Primary inflows: Mountain Brook; Round Pond Brook; Back Creek
- Primary outflows: North outlet: tributary of Bean River; South outlet: Pawtuckaway River
- Basin countries: United States
- Max. length: 3.5 mi (5.6 km)
- Max. width: 1.1 mi (1.8 km)
- Surface area: 784 acres (3.17 km^{2})
- Average depth: 9 ft (2.7 m)
- Max. depth: 50 ft (15 m)
- Surface elevation: 250 ft (76 m)
- Islands: Big Island; Log Cabin Island; Horse Island; numerous islets
- Settlements: Nottingham

Pawtuckaway Lake (official name Pawtuckaway Pond) is a 784-acre (3.17 km^{2}) reservoir in Rockingham County in southeastern New Hampshire, United States, in the town of Nottingham. The lake is located in the Piscataqua River drainage basin.

The lake presently has two dams and three dikes. The dam on the southern end of the lake, Dolloff Dam, feeds the Pawtuckaway River, which flows southeast to the Lamprey River in the western part of the town of Epping. The dam at the north end of the lake, Drown's Dam, releases water to the Bean River, leading to the North River and ultimately the Lamprey River in the northern part of Epping.

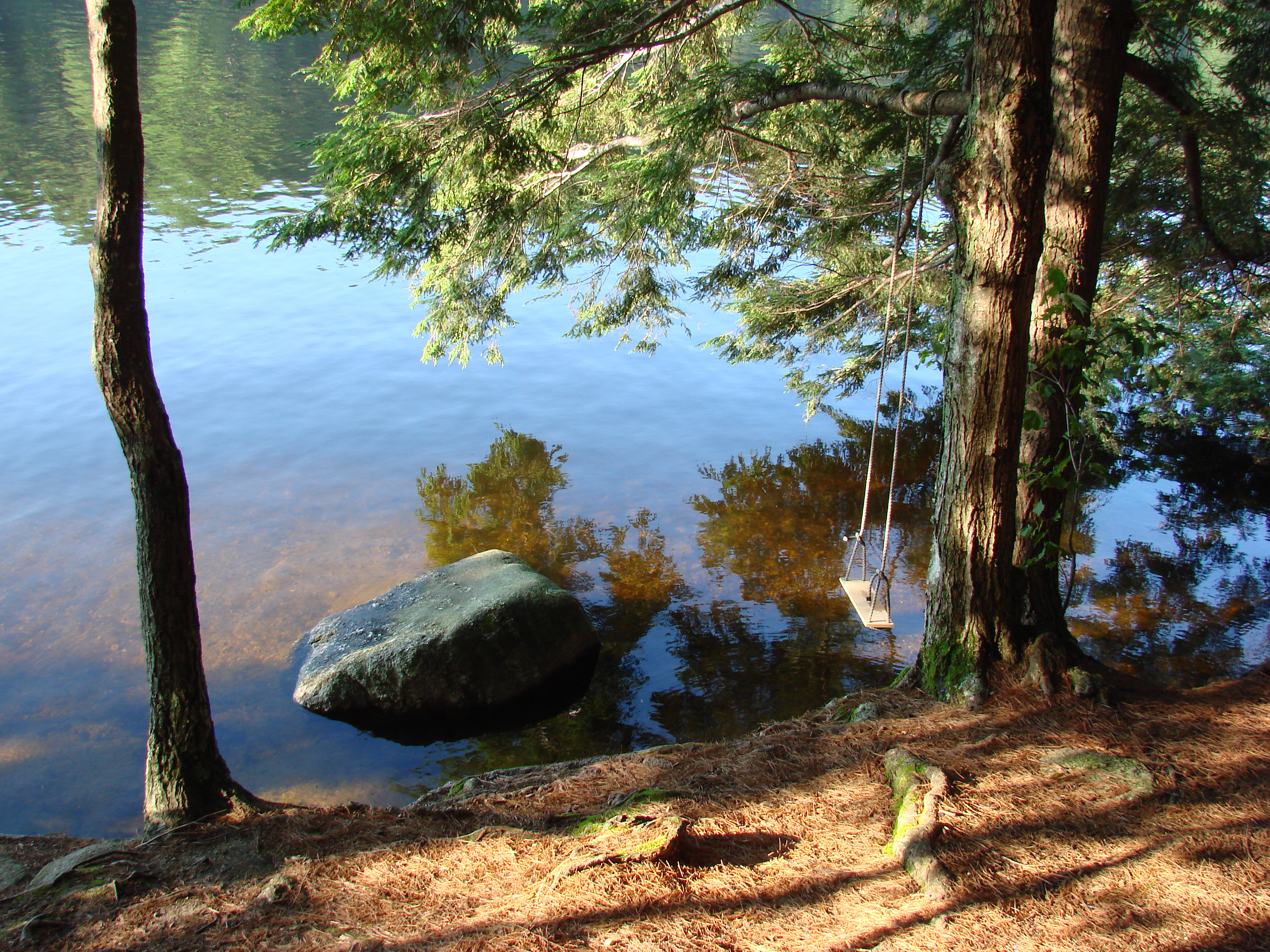
The edge of the lake on Horse Island, from a campsite at Pawtuckaway State Park

Approximately half of the lake's shoreline consists of private homes with a mixture of seasonal and year-round residents. Most of the western side of Pawtuckaway Lake is occupied by Pawtuckaway State Park, a popular camping, swimming, boating, hiking, bouldering, and orienteering destination. Canoe orienteering events are held on the lake.

== Name ==
The original pond was called Pawtuckaway Pond, and the name stayed after the pond was enlarged such that it encompassed nearby Dolloff Pond. According to the U.S. Board on Geographic Names, this is still its official name, and anything that uses federal data also uses that name. However, it is usually referred to as Pawtuckaway Lake by residents and organizations, even by Pawtuckaway State Park.

== History ==
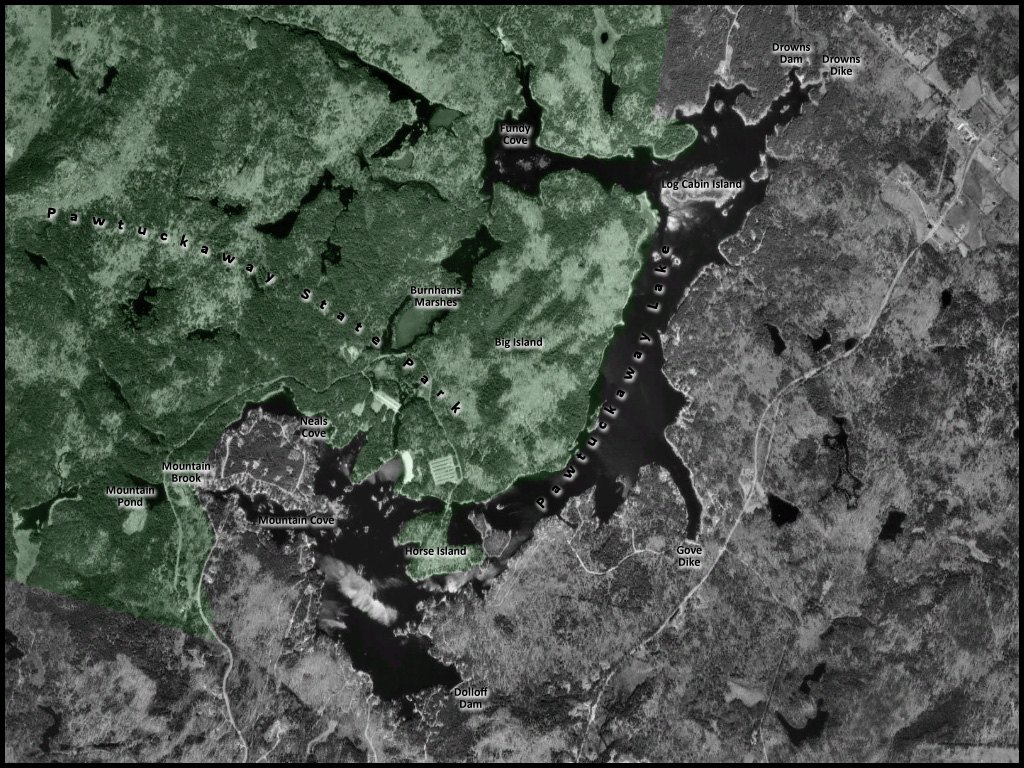
A map of the lake, with Pawtuckaway State Park shown in green

The area was originally composed of many brooks which collected in low spots and formed two small ponds: Dolloff Pond and Pawtuckaway Pond. Some of the brooks that ran through the area eventually flowed into the Pawtuckaway River. Both the North River and the Pawtuckaway River then fed into the Lamprey River.

The construction of two colonial sawmills marked the beginning of enlarging the small ponds. On the north end, in 1729 a sawmill enlarged Pawtuckaway Pond. On the south end, in 1732 another sawmill enlarged Dolloff Pond.

Beginning in 1825 the Newmarket Manufacturing Company began to acquire land in the area for the construction of a reservoir to supply a consistent source of water power to its textile mill in nearby Newmarket, downstream from the lake. In 1836 two dams and several dikes were constructed that changed the features and character of the two ponds, causing their waters to merge except when the water levels were drawn down.

Eventually, steam power replaced water power, and gradually less water was drained from the lake to generate power. As water levels rose over time, Dolloff Pond and Pawtuckaway Pond stayed continuously merged as a single body of water. When the Newmarket Manufacturing Company fell on hard times in the early 1920s, it closed its mill in Newmarket. Its interests in the lake eventually passed into the hands of the New Hampshire Electric Company, which outfitted the dams with generators for hydroelectric power. Ultimately, the production of electricity became unprofitable and in December 1955 NH Electric deeded the lake, its islands, its adjacent land, two dams, the dikes, and the water rights to the State of New Hampshire.

In 1958 Dolloff Pond was officially considered merged into Pawtuckaway Pond. The level of the lake is now managed for recreational and environmental uses.

== Geography ==
The lake contains many shallow parts where rocks can be seen, even in the middle of the lake. It also contains countless small islets, ranging from small rocks protruding from the water to large islands. These numerous features make the lake attractive for canoe orienteering. The largest island is Big Island, although it is not obviously an island. It is considered to be an island because on its western side it is separated from the mainland by marshland. The southern portion of Big Island contains about half of the campsites in Pawtuckaway State Park. The second largest island is Horse Island, named so because of its shape. Horse Island also contains a large proportion of the park's campsites. The remaining campsites are located on the north side of Neal's Cove. The park has picnic areas, a launch for power boats, a separate canoe and kayak launch, and a beach area with a roped-off section for swimming.

The water level of the lake is managed to maintain separate summer and winter target levels, and to ensure minimum outflows during droughts.

== Fishery ==
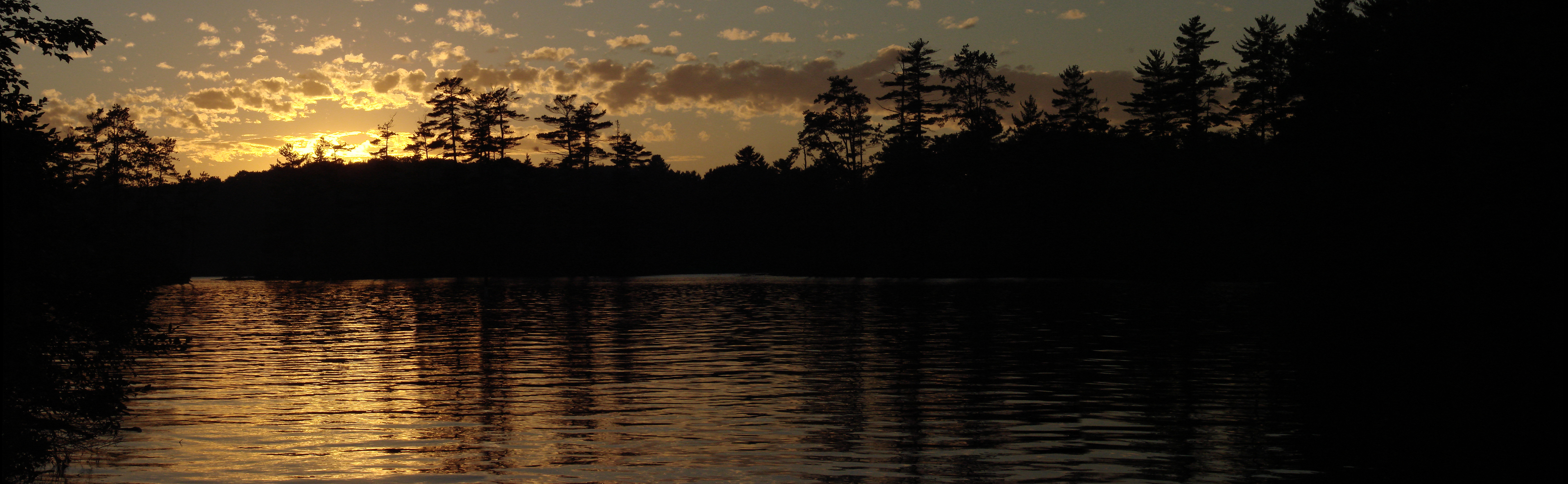
Sunset over part of Pawtuckaway Lake in August

The lake is classified as a warmwater fishery, with observed species including smallmouth and largemouth bass, chain pickerel, white perch, horned pout, and black crappie.

== See also ==
- List of lakes in New Hampshire
