= Mendum's Pond =

Mendums Pond
- Location within New Hampshire Location within the United States
- Location: Strafford / Rockingham counties, New Hampshire
- Coordinates: 43°10′24″N 71°3′51″W
- Type: glacial lake
- Primary outflows: Little River
- Basin countries: United States
- Max. length: 1.3 mi (2.1 km)
- Max. width: 0.5 mi (0.80 km)
- Surface area: 253 acres (1.02 km^{2})
- Average depth: 25 ft (7.6 m)
- Max. depth: 45 ft (14 m)
- Surface elevation: 225 feet (69 m)
- Islands: 7
- Settlements: Barrington

Mendums Pond (occasionally spelled Mendum's Pond) is a 253-acre (1.02 km^{2}) reservoir located primarily in Strafford County in eastern New Hampshire, United States, in the town of Barrington. Its extreme southern end dips into the town of Nottingham in Rockingham County. The pond is located on the Little River, a tributary of the Lamprey River and part of the larger Piscataqua River watershed.

Like nearby Pawtuckaway Lake, Mendums Pond was created to ensure a consistent water supply for the Newmarket Manufacturing Company, a water-powered cotton textile manufacturer founded in 1822. During drought, a regulated flow would be released from the dam to run mills downriver in Newmarket.

The University of New Hampshire owns 187.6 acres (0.8 km^{2}) of forestland on Mendums Pond. Arthur W. McDaniel donated a small parcel to the college in 1930, then the remainder in 1970. Located at the shoreline is the UNH Sailing Club, which holds intra-collegiate races, with the rest of the property divided into areas for recreation, wildlife and timber harvesting.

The pond is classified as a warm water fishery, with observed species including smallmouth and largemouth bass, chain pickerel, and horned pout.

== See also ==
- List of lakes in New Hampshire
