= Fresh River (New Hampshire) =

- Location within New Hampshire Location within the United States

Location
- Country: United States
- State: New Hampshire
- County: Rockingham
- Towns: Brentwood, Epping, Exeter, Newfields

Physical characteristics
- Source
  - location: Brentwood
  - coordinates: 43°1′10″N 71°1′24″W
  - elevation: 110 ft (34 m)
- Mouth: Piscassic River
  - location: Newfields
  - coordinates: 43°1′51″N 70°58′31″W
  - elevation: 85 ft (26 m)
- Length: 3.2 mi (5.1 km)

Basin features
- Tributaries
  - right: Beech Hill Brook

The Fresh River is a 3.2-mile-long (5.1 km) stream in southeastern New Hampshire in the United States. It is a tributary of the Piscassic River, which flows into the Lamprey River and is part of the Great Bay and Piscataqua River watershed leading to the Atlantic Ocean.

Nearly the entire course of the river is through freshwater wetlands. The vertical drop of the stream over its three-mile length is less than 30 feet (9 m). It rises on the border between the towns of Epping and Brentwood and flows east into the northern corner of Exeter. The river crosses into Newfields just before joining the Piscassic River at the Piscassic Ice Pond.

== See also ==
- List of rivers of New Hampshire
