= Pawtuckaway State Park =

Preserve in New Hampshire, United States

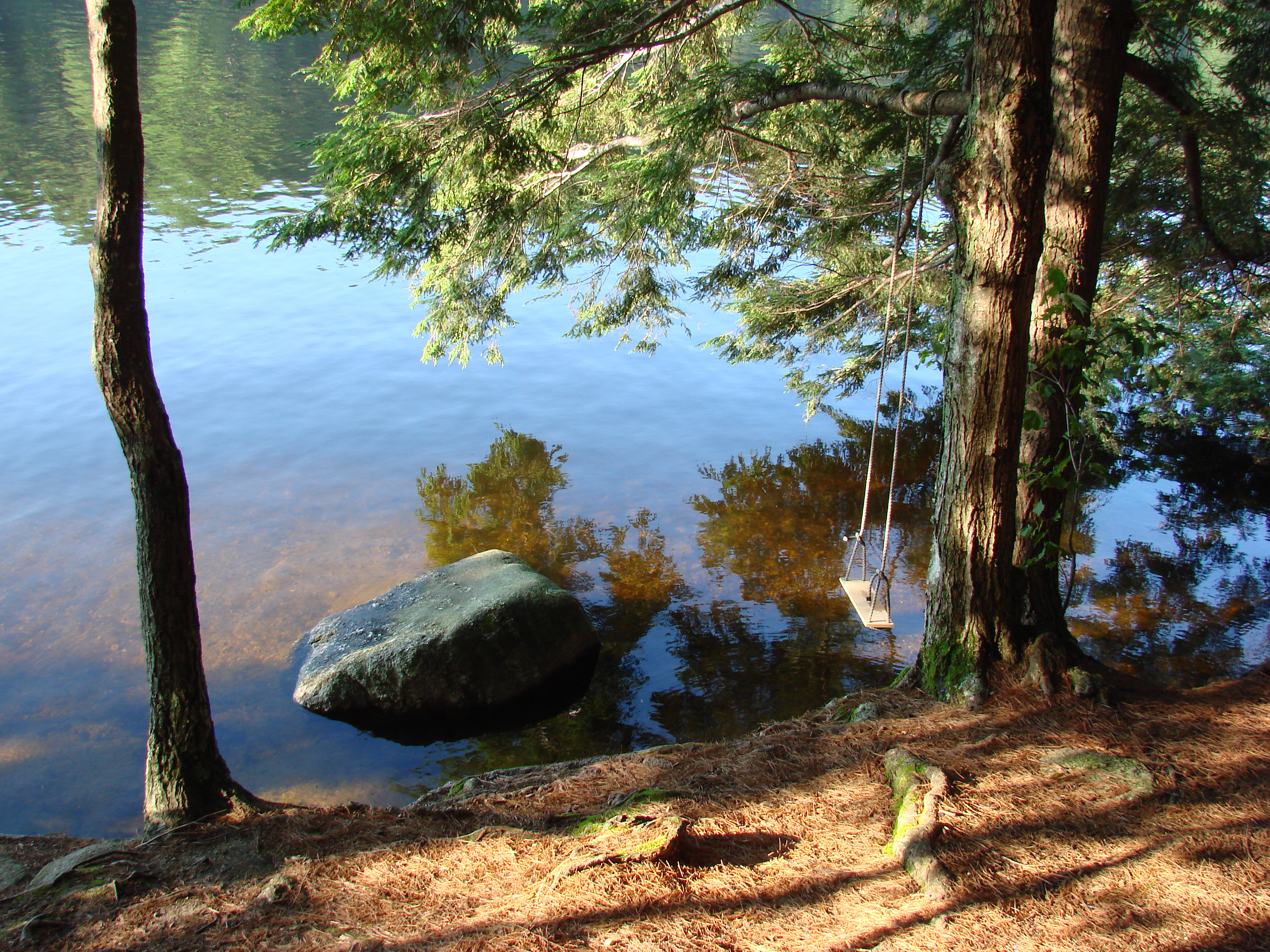

- Location within New Hampshire
- Interactive map of Pawtuckaway State Park
- Location: Nottingham and Deerfield, New Hampshire, United States
- Coordinates: 43°6′7″N 71°10′52″W
- Area: 5,500 acres (2,200 ha)
- Opened: 1966
- Administrator: New Hampshire Division of Parks and Recreation
- Website: Official website
- New Hampshire State Parks

Pawtuckaway State Park is a 5,500-acre (2,200 ha) preserve in New Hampshire, United States. It is named for Pawtuckaway Lake and the Pawtuckaway Mountains. The park extends from the west shore of the lake to the west side of the mountains and lies within the Northeastern coastal forests ecoregion.

== History ==
The area was originally composed of many brooks which collected in low spots and formed small ponds, such as what was then known as Pawtuckaway Pond. Some of the brooks that ran through the area eventually ran into the Pawtuckaway River. Both the North River and the Pawtuckaway River then ran into the Lamprey River.

The construction of two colonial sawmills marked the beginning of enlarging the small ponds. On the north end, in 1729 a sawmill enlarged Pawtuckaway Pond. On the south end, in 1732 another sawmill enlarged Dolloff Pond.

Beginning in 1825 the Newmarket Manufacturing Company began to acquire land in the area for the construction of a reservoir to supply a consistent source of water power to its textile mill in nearby Newmarket, downstream from the lake. In 1836 two dams and several dikes were constructed that changed the features and character of the two ponds, causing their waters to merge except when the water levels were drawn down.

Eventually, steam power replaced water power, and gradually less water was drained from the lake to generate power. As water levels rose over time, Dolloff Pond and Pawtuckaway Pond merged into a single body of water. When the Newmarket Manufacturing Company fell on hard times in the early 1920s, it closed its mill in Newmarket. Its interests in the lake eventually passed into the hands of the New Hampshire Electric Company, which outfitted the dams with generators for hydroelectric power. Ultimately, the production of electricity became unprofitable and in December 1955 NH Electric deeded the lake, its islands, its adjacent land, two dams, the dikes, and the water rights to the State of New Hampshire. In 1958 Dolloff Pond was officially considered merged into Pawtuckaway Pond, and the level of the pond is now managed for recreational and environmental uses.

== Geology ==
The Pawtuckaway Mountains are a small, rocky, circular range that form the outline of an ancient volcanic ring dike dating from 130 to 110 million years ago (Cretaceous). The ring dike, first completely mapped in 1944, is a smaller and more accessible example of the same kind of geological process that formed the Ossipee Mountains to the north. The inner ring is roughly one mile in diameter, while the outer is measured at almost two miles.

Earthquakes occurred in the vicinity of the ring dike in the summer and fall of 1845. Known as the Deerfield explosions, they were described as subterranean noises "often as loud as the report of a 12 pounder cannon when heard at a distance of half a mile" but without echoes. They were the subject of much speculation at the time.

== Gallery ==
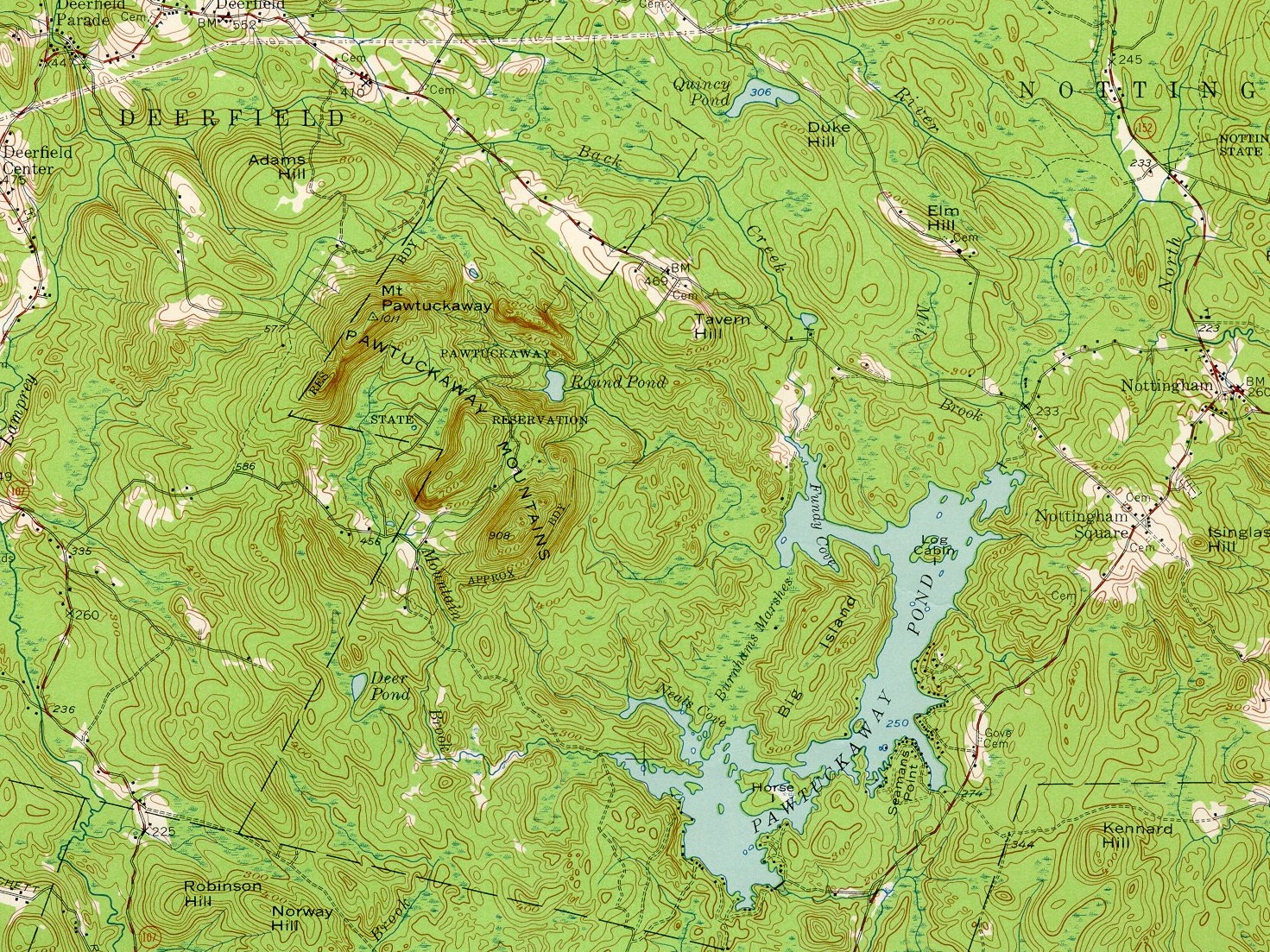
1957 topographic map, showing lake and ring dike

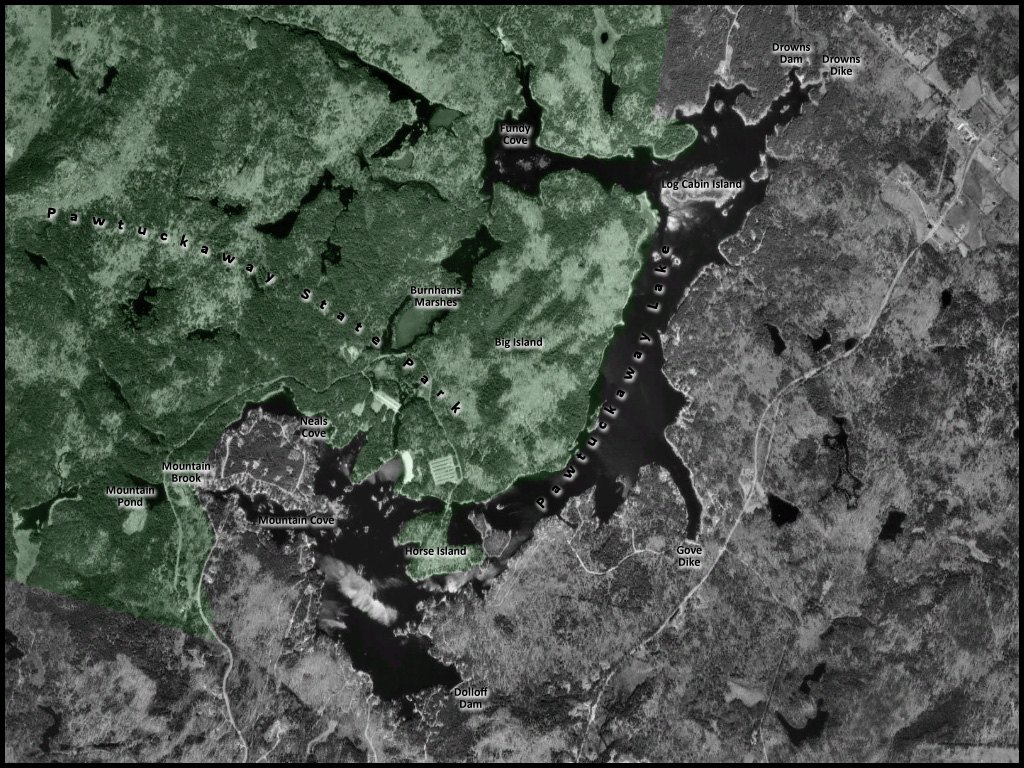
Aerial map of Pawtuckaway Lake and part of Pawtuckaway State Park (green overlay); the southeast quarter of the ring dike is visible in the upper left corner

== Recreation ==
The park has 32 miles (51 km) of hiking trails. Trails lead to the approximately 900-foot (270 m) summits of North and South Pawtuckaway mountains and connect the ring dike area to the lake. Other hiking trails lead to ponds, boulder fields, and views of the lake. Some of the hiking trails are used in the winter as snowmobile routes. The Pawtuckaway ring dike includes a boulder field of interest to boulderers, along with roped climbing, and the park is a popular destination for geocaching.

The lake is a 783-acre (317 ha) water body with numerous islands and coves and is a popular boating, fishing, and swimming destination. Since orienteering enthusiasts made an orienteering map of the park in 1992, the park has become a venue for major orienteering meets, including foot orienteering and canoe orienteering. The venue is shared by several orienteering clubs in New England, including Cambridge Sports Union, New England Orienteering Club, and Up North Orienteers.

Park amenities include five cabins, 195 campsites, boat launch, swimming beach, camp store, ball field, playground, bathhouse, shelters, picnic tables, and canoe, paddleboard, and kayak rentals.
