= Pawtuckaway River =

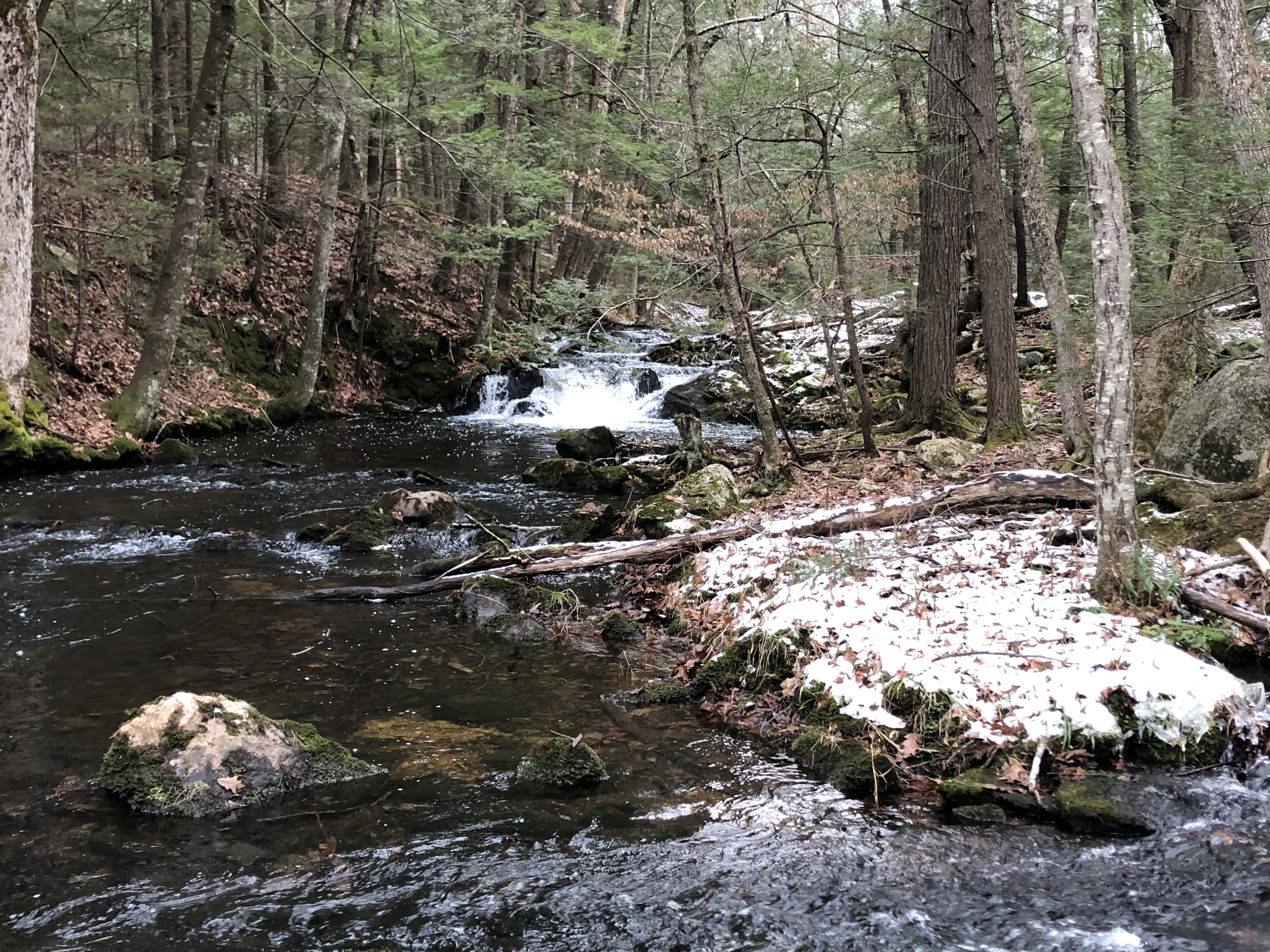
- The Pawtuckaway River near its source in Nottingham, NH

- Location within New Hampshire Location within the United States

Location
- Country: United States
- State: New Hampshire
- County: Rockingham
- Towns: Nottingham, Raymond, Epping

Physical characteristics
- Source: Pawtuckaway Lake
  - location: Nottingham
  - coordinates: 43°4′20″N 71°9′4″W
  - elevation: 250 ft (76 m)
- Mouth: Lamprey River
  - location: West Epping
  - coordinates: 43°2′28″N 71°7′36″W
  - elevation: 128 ft (39 m)
- Length: 3.6 mi (5.8 km)

The Pawtuckaway River is a 3.6-mile-long (5.8 km) river in southeastern New Hampshire in the United States. It is a tributary of the Lamprey River, part of the Great Bay and Piscataqua River watershed leading to the Atlantic Ocean.

The river forms the south outlet of Pawtuckaway Lake, a 900-acre (360 ha) lake in the town of Nottingham, New Hampshire. The river travels southeast through a wooded valley, passing under New Hampshire Route 156, entering the town of Raymond briefly, then crossing into Epping, where it joins the Lamprey River near the village of West Epping.

== See also ==
- List of rivers of New Hampshire
