= Bean River =

- Location within New Hampshire Location within the United States

Location
- Country: United States
- State: New Hampshire
- County: Rockingham
- Towns: Northwood, Deerfield, Nottingham

Physical characteristics
- Source: Saddleback Mountain
  - location: Northwood
  - coordinates: 43°10′32″N 71°12′13″W
  - elevation: 950 ft (290 m)
- Mouth: North River
  - location: Nottingham
  - coordinates: 43°7′44″N 71°6′32″W
  - elevation: 225 ft (69 m)
- Length: 7.4 mi (11.9 km)

The Bean River is a 7.4-mile (11.9 km) long river located in southeastern New Hampshire in the United States. It is a tributary of the North River, part of the Lamprey River/Great Bay/Piscataqua River watershed leading to the Atlantic Ocean.

The river rises near the summit of Saddleback Mountain on the border between Northwood and Deerfield. The river flows southeast through Deerfield and quickly enters Nottingham, where it picks up the north outlet of Pawtuckaway Lake shortly before joining the North River one mile north of Nottingham village.

== See also ==
- List of rivers of New Hampshire
