= Epping (CDP), New Hampshire =

Census-designated place in New Hampshire, United States

Epping, New Hampshire
- Census-designated place
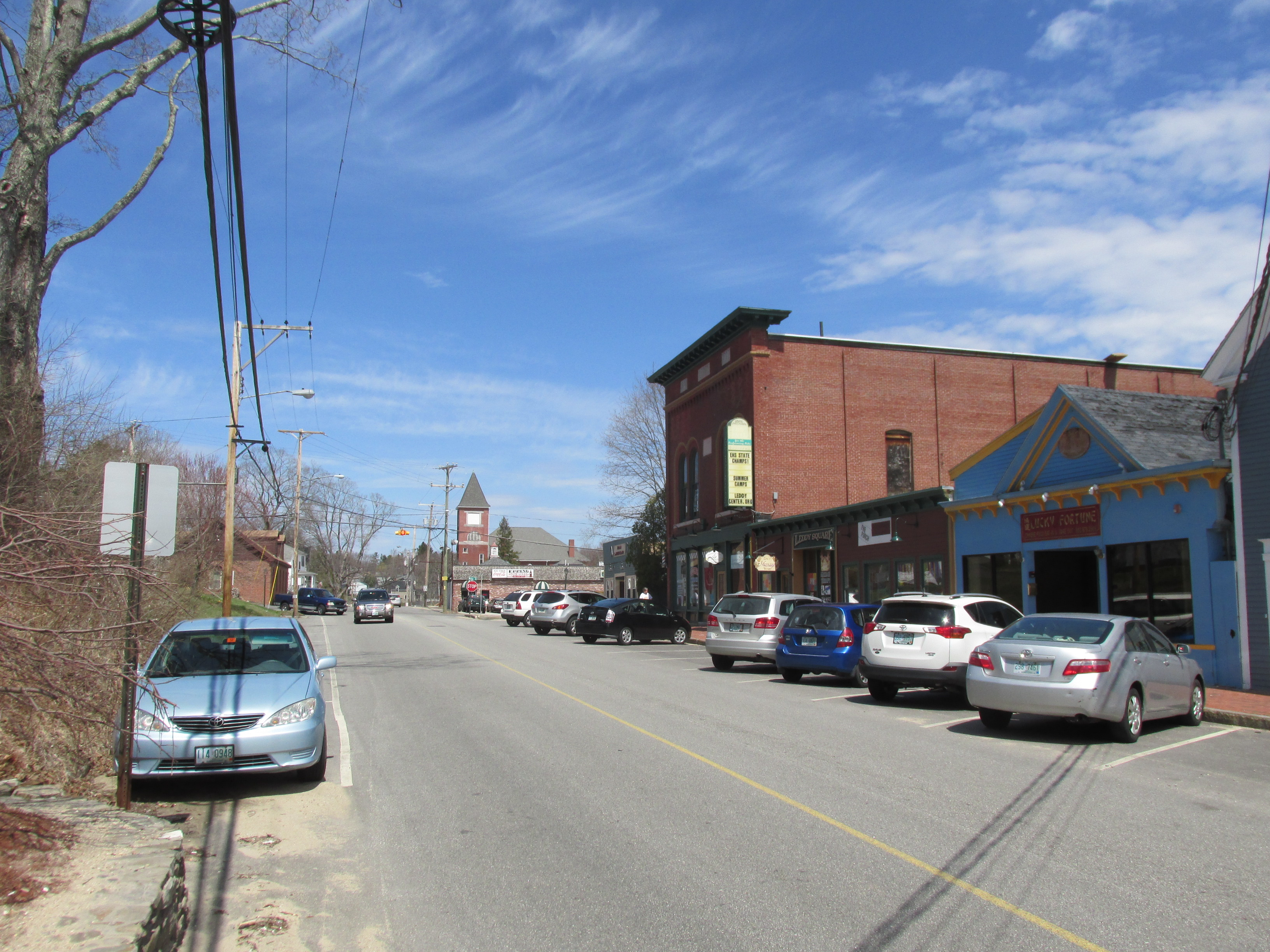
- Main Street

- Location within New Hampshire Location within the United States
- Coordinates: 43°02′07″N 71°06′43″W
- Country: United States
- State: New Hampshire
- County: Rockingham
- Town: Epping

Area
  - Total: 4.34 sq mi (11.23 km^{2})
  - Land: 4.30 sq mi (11.14 km^{2})
  - Water: 0.035 sq mi (0.09 km^{2})
- Elevation: 164 ft (50 m)

Population (2020)
  - Total: 2,693
  - Density: 626.2/sq mi (241.77/km^{2})
- Time zone: UTC-5 (Eastern (EST))
  - Summer (DST): UTC-4 (EDT)
- ZIP code: 03042
- Area code: 603
- FIPS code: 33-24580
- GNIS feature ID: 2378062

Epping is a census-designated place (CDP) and the main village in the town of Epping, New Hampshire, United States. The population of the CDP was 2,693 at the 2020 census, out of 7,125 in the entire town.

== Geography ==
The CDP is in the south-central part of the town of Epping, comprising most of the main village of Epping, part of the village of West Epping, and less densely developed land in between. The CDP is bordered to the south by the New Hampshire Route 101 expressway and to the west by the Lamprey River from NH 101 to NH 27 (Pleasant Street). The northern border of the CDP follows NH 27 and the Lamprey River, until the village of Epping in the eastern part of the CDP, where it follows Prescott Road and Old Hedding Road to Delaney Road, east of NH 125. The eastern border stays east of NH 125 from Old Hedding Road to NH 101.

NH Route 101, with one exit in Epping, leads east 12 miles (19 km) to Interstate 95 in Hampton and west 19 miles (31 km) to Interstate 93 in Manchester. Route 125, which intersects Route 101 at Exit 7 in Epping, leads north 21 miles (34 km) to Rochester and south 20 miles (32 km) to Haverhill, Massachusetts. Route 27, the pre-expressway routing of Route 101, leads east 7 miles (11 km) to Exeter and west 6 miles (10 km) to Raymond.

According to the U.S. Census Bureau, the Epping CDP has a total area of 4.3 square miles (11.2 km^{2}), of which 0.04 square miles (0.1 km^{2}), or 0.82%, are water. The Lamprey River passes through Epping village, flowing east toward Great Bay.

== Demographics ==
Historical population
Census	Pop.	Note	%±
1970	1,097		—
1980	1,384		26.2%
1990	1,384		0.0%
2000	1,673		20.9%
2010	1,681		0.5%
2020	2,693		60.2%
U.S. Decennial Census

As of the census of 2010, there were 1,681 people, 766 households, and 447 families residing in the CDP. There were 847 housing units, of which 81, or 9.6%, were vacant. The racial makeup of the CDP was 96.7% white, 0.3% African American, 0.1% Native American, 1.0% Asian, 0.0% Pacific Islander, 1.1% some other race, and 1.8% from two or more races. 1.2% of the population were Hispanic or Latino of any race.

Of the 766 households in the CDP, 24.3% had children under the age of 18 living with them, 43.5% were headed by married couples living together, 10.2% had a female householder with no husband present, and 41.6% were non-families. 33.7% of all households were made up of individuals, and 13.2% were someone living alone who was 65 years of age or older. The average household size was 2.19, and the average family size was 2.79.

18.2% of residents in the CDP were under the age of 18, 9.8% were from age 18 to 24, 24.3% were from 25 to 44, 29.7% were from 45 to 64, and 18.1% were 65 years of age or older. The median age was 43.4 years. For every 100 females, there were 87.8 males. For every 100 females age 18 and over, there were 83.1 males.

For the period 2011–15, the estimated median annual income for a household was $50,438, and the median income for a family was $57,083. Male full-time workers had a median income of $50,917 versus $48,447 for females. The per capita income for the CDP was $27,359. 9.5% of the population and 4.5% of families were below the poverty line.
