= Frank J. Mafera =

American inventor (1898–1956)

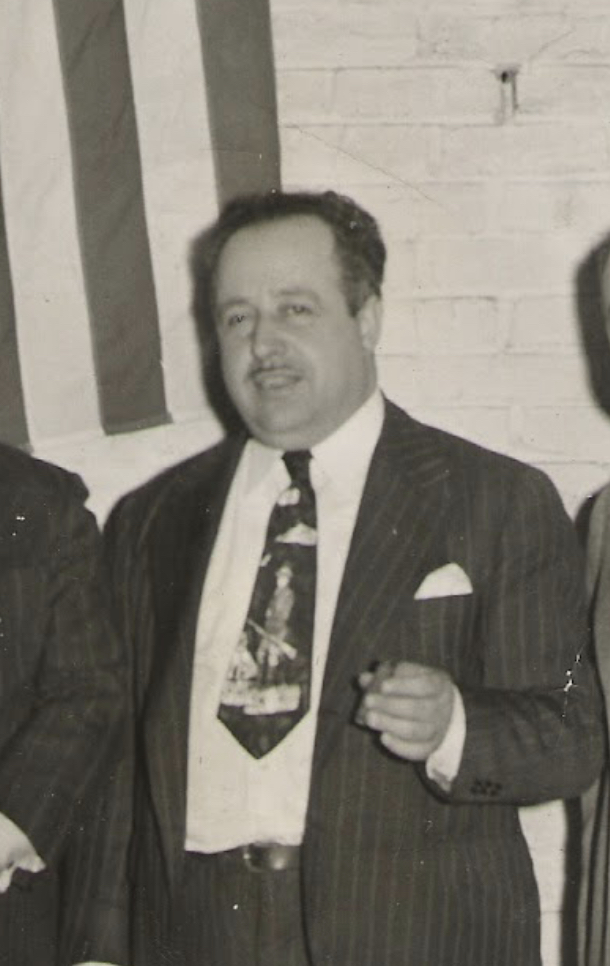
- Mafera, c. 1940s
- Born: Francesco John Mafera Sr. July 18, 1898; Boston, Massachusetts, U.S.
- Died: February 13, 1956 (aged 57); Raymond, New Hampshire, U.S.
- Burial place: New Pine Grove Cemetery, Raymond, New Hampshire
- Occupations: Inventor; businessman
- Known for: Patent for residential chain link fence
- Spouse: Juanita Merrick (m. 1922)

Francesco "Frank" John Mafera, Sr. (July 18, 1898 – February 13, 1956) was an American businessman and inventor notable for patenting the first method for weaving chain-link fencing. In 1930, Mafera filed an application for a "method of forming wire fence fabric", which was approved in 1931. Mafera's brother already owned a chain-link fence company in Medford, Massachusetts, and Mafera's 1931 patent was one of the several advancements made by the Maferas in the development of chain-link fencing.

Mafera first sold the fencing from his house in Raymond, New Hampshire, under the name of the Barnyard Fence Company. This company eventually became the New Hampshire Fence Company. In 1956, Mafera and his wife died in their sleep when their house caught fire.

While Mafera's contributions to the development of fencing were long overlooked, his industrial innovations have received more attention in recent years. In 2022, a New Hampshire Historical Marker was installed in Raymond to honor his achievement.

== Life and career ==
Francesco John Mafera, Sr. was born on July 18, 1898, in Boston, Massachusetts, to Italian immigrants Gaetano Mafera and Maria Mafera (née Lachessi). He had eight siblings, including Gaetano "Guy" Octavio Mafera Jr.

Mafera's 1918 draft card lists him as blind in his right eye and employed as a clerk at a spring bed company in Boston. Here, Frank and Guy were inspired by the bed's spring system and weaving to experiment with integrating these features into fencing. Chain-link fence had been invented by this time, but was not used widely. Mafera was inspired by the way residents in cramped Boston neighborhoods stood spring beds up between houses to create a makeshift barrier. At this time, Mafera was living in Revere, Massachusetts.

On May 17, 1922, Mafera married Juanita Merrick in Manchester, New Hampshire. Merrick was born in Haverhill, Massachusetts, but lived in Revere. Their marriage was kept a secret from their respective families until the day of the wedding. The couple honeymooned in Bangor, Maine.

Around this time, Guy had opened the American Chain Link Fence Company on Ship Avenue in Medford, Massachusetts. Though sources vary (Note: Several of the companies that split off from the American Chain Link Fence Company claim the original company was founded in the 1890s. A 1939 pamphlet from the company celebrating their 47th anniversary would place the establishment date in 1892.) on the company's establishment date, Mafera joined his brother at the company by the late 1920s to produce chain-link fencing. By this time, Guy himself held two patents related to making wire bed bottoms and wire fabric. Building on his brother's patent on wire fabric, Mafera applied for a patent for a "method of forming wire fence fabric" on September 3, 1930. The patent was granted to Mafera on June 23, 1931.

By this time, Mafera lived on Lane Road in Raymond, New Hampshire. He split his time between New Hampshire and Massachusetts and was a member of the Raymond Select Board, Manchester Chamber of Commerce, New Hampshire Advertising Club, and Revere's Lodge of Elks. Mafera established the Barnyard Fence Company from his house in Raymond in 1947 to sell fencing in northern New England, eventually moving to a building on New Hampshire Route 101 (now New Hampshire Route 27) in 1950.

== Death ==
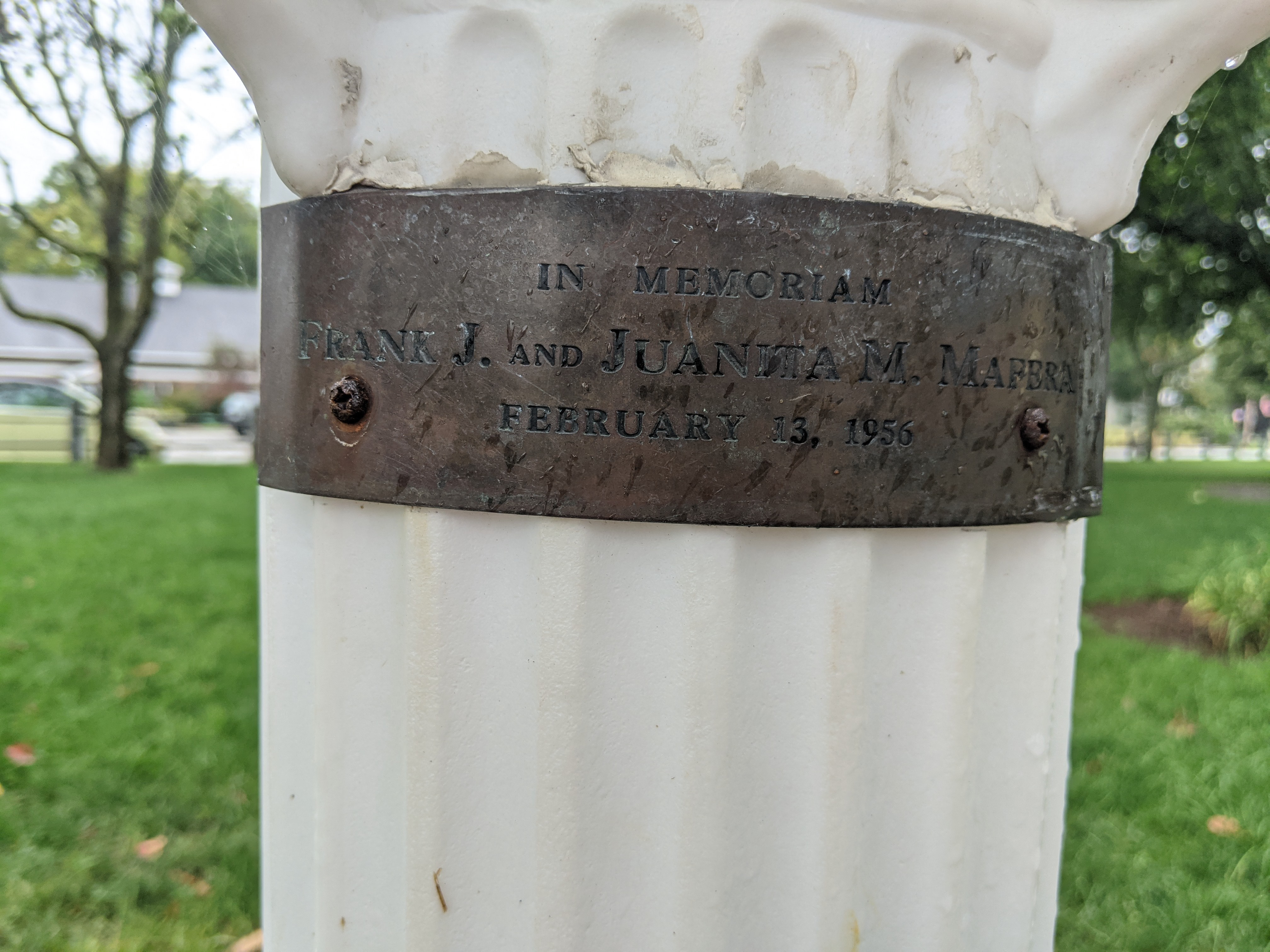
A memorial plaque for the Maferas on a sundial in Raymond's village green

On February 10, 1956, Mafera and his wife died when their house caught fire in the middle of the night. Mafera's neighbors reportedly tried to rescue the couple, but were unsuccessful in trying to break down the door of the house. The cause of the fire was never determined.

Mafera and his wife were buried in the New Pine Grove Cemetery in Raymond. Their children donated a water fountain to the town of Raymond, which was placed in the village green. The fountain was eventually replaced by a sundial which still stands.

== Contributions to chain-link fencing ==
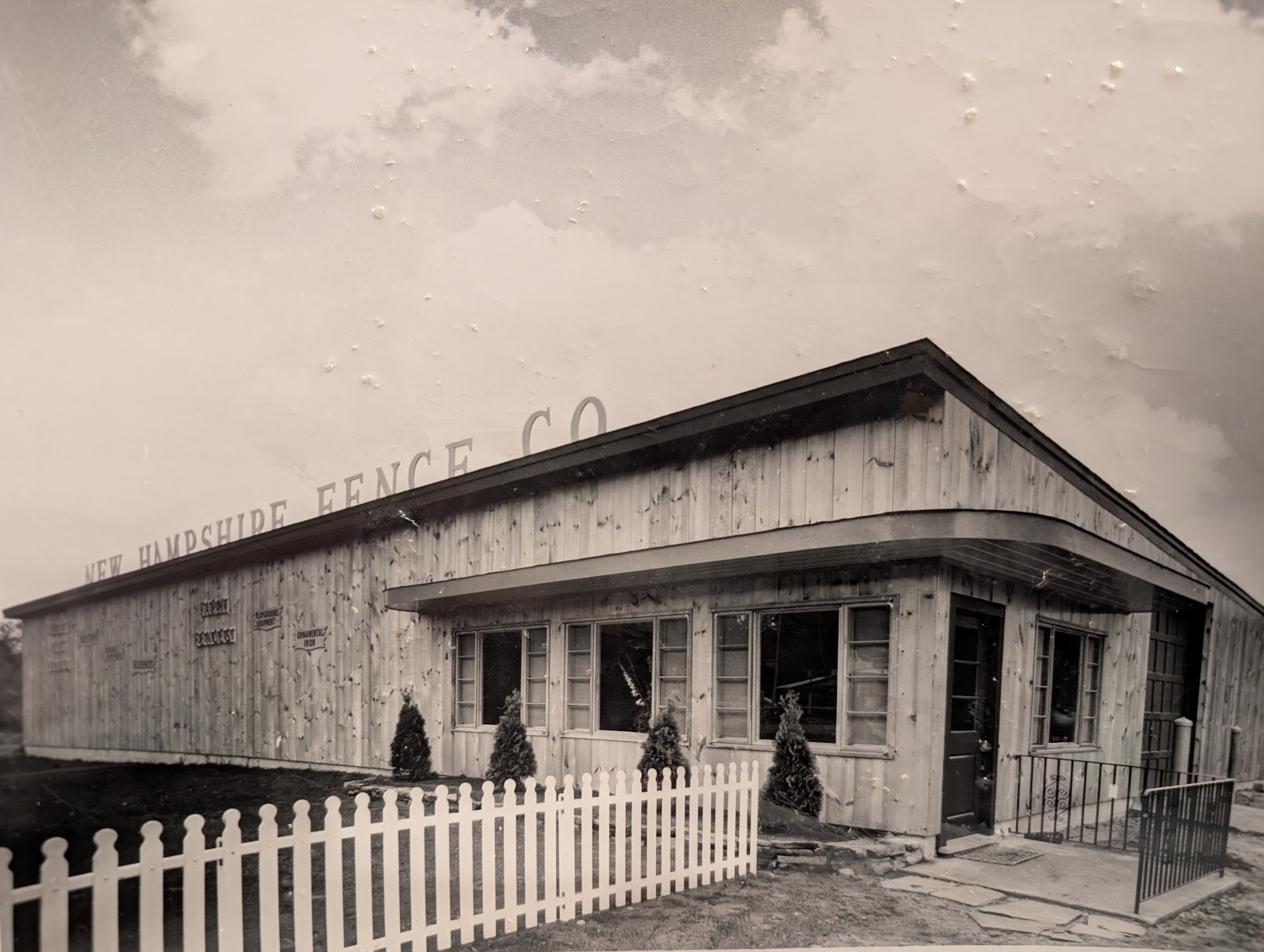
The New Hampshire Fence Company in Raymond (c.1960s)

Mafera was not the inventor of chain-link fencing, but his method of weaving wire fabric in a way that "produced a closed, rounded configuration" helped eliminate "ragged or unsightly" twists or barbs, making it more appealing for residential use. The invention of chain-link fencing is generally credited to English industrialist Charles Barnard, but it is unlikely Mafera or his brother knew of Bernard's invention and were instead inspired by spring beds.

Weaving wire fabric, too, was not an invention of Mafera's. As early as 1872, a patent had been filed for "improvement in machines for weaving wire fabric". However, this patent was filed for the purpose of "connecting ends of helical springs for mattresses". Whether Mafera knew of this patent or not is inconsequential, as it expired before his birth.

In 1949, Mafera was granted a patent for "woven wire fencing" which "embod[ied] a plurality of wire units extending in overlapped relation transversely of the fencing" with "each unit embodying two spaced wire strands extending in spaced zig-zag paths traversely across and connected at the margins of the fencing". This method of chain-link fencing is still commonly used today.

The American Chain Link Fence Company split off into a multitude of fence installation companies across northern New England, many of whom claim Guy Mafera to be the patent-holder for weaving chain-link fence. Shannon Fence Company Inc. in Billerica, Massachusetts, state on their website that Guy "held a patent for a wire twisting machine that created the most popular fencing material in the United States — chain-link." However, no patent under Guy's name related to chain-link fencing exists that predates Mafera's.
