= Raymond High School (New Hampshire) =

Public school in Raymond, New Hampshire, US

Coordinates: 43°02′55″N 71°10′33″W

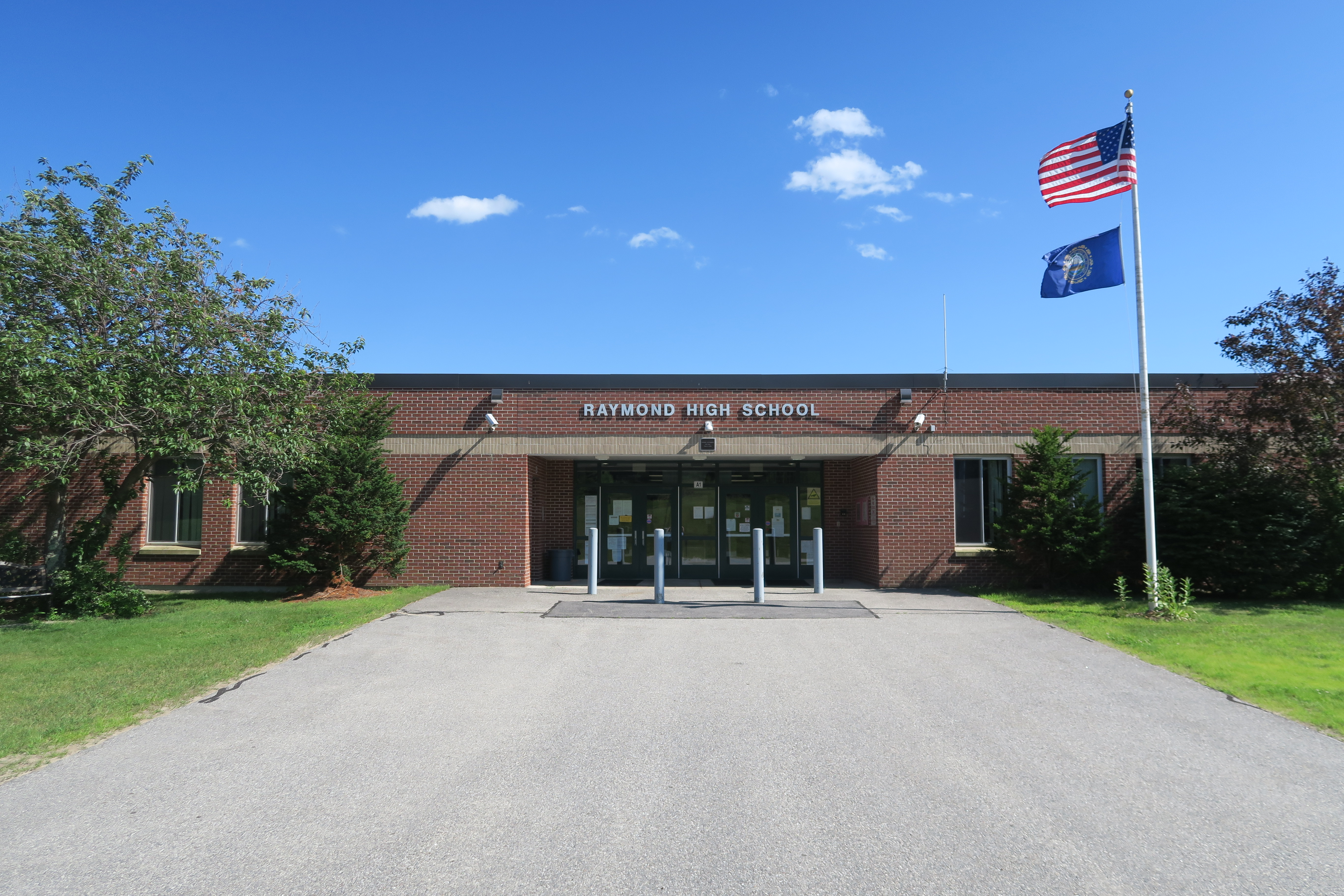
- Raymond High School

Location
- 45 Harriman Hill Rd; Raymond, New Hampshire 03077; United States

Information
- Type: Public high school
- Principal: Peter Dannible
- Staff: 29.10 (FTE)
- Enrollment: 339 (2023–2024)
- Student to teacher ratio: 11.65
- Color
- Mascot: Ram
- Website: www.sau33.com/raymond-high-school

Raymond High School is a public high school in the state of New Hampshire. Located in the town of Raymond, over 400 students attend. Its mascot is the ram, and the school colors are green and white.
