= Little River (Lamprey River tributary) =

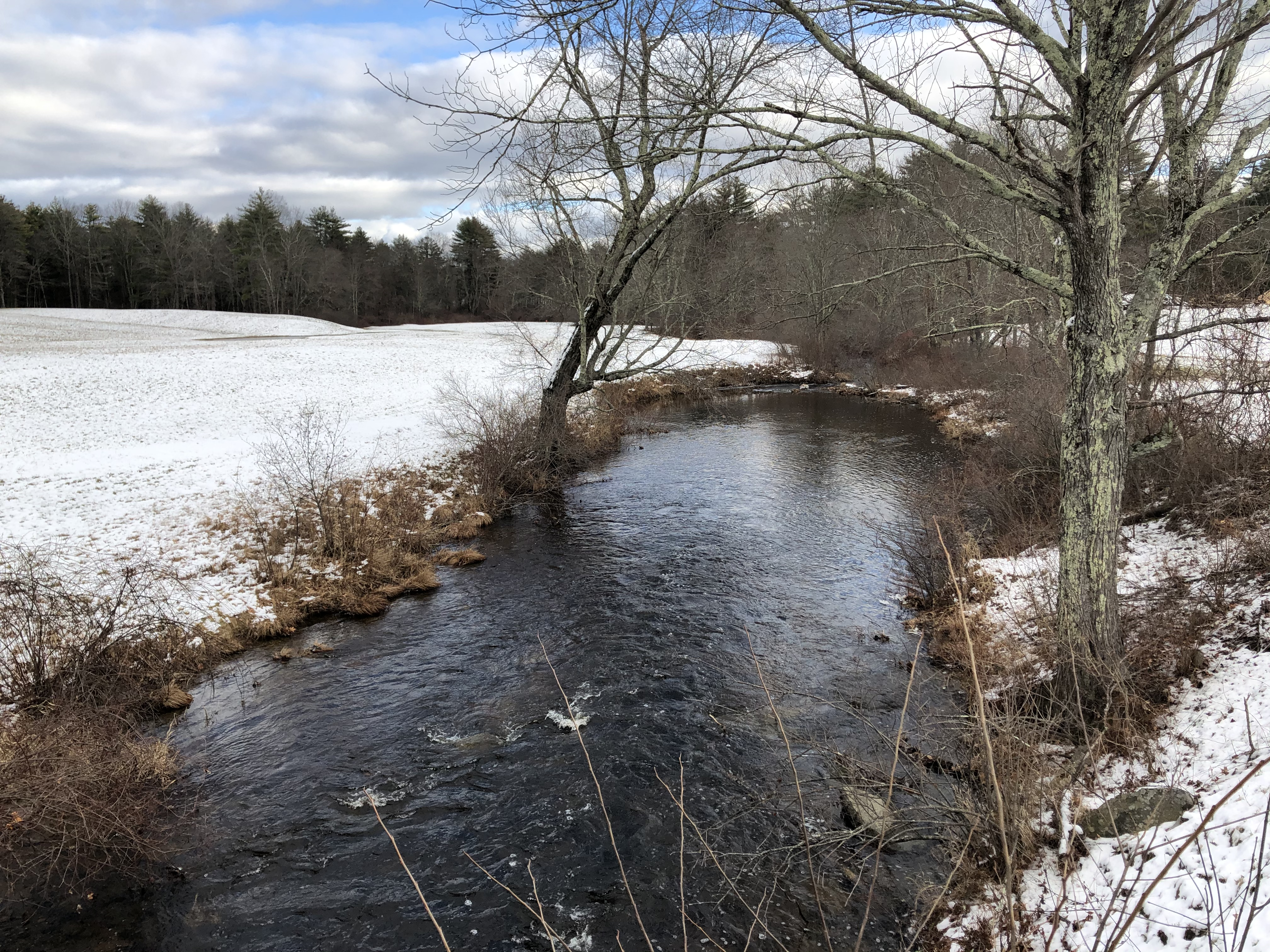
- The Little River near its mouth in Lee, NH

- Location within New Hampshire Location within the United States

Location
- Country: United States
- State: New Hampshire
- Counties: Rockingham, Strafford
- Towns: Nottingham, Lee

Physical characteristics
- Source: Mendums Pond
  - location: Nottingham
  - coordinates: 43°9′47″N 71°4′6″W
  - elevation: 225 ft (69 m)
- Mouth: Lamprey River
  - location: Lee
  - coordinates: 43°6′42″N 71°0′27″W
  - elevation: 65 ft (20 m)
- Length: 10.4 mi (16.7 km)

Basin features
- Tributaries
  - right: Pea Porridge Brook

The Little River is a 10.4-mile-long (16.7 km) river in southeastern New Hampshire in the United States. It is a tributary of the Lamprey River, part of the Great Bay and Piscataqua River watershed leading to the Atlantic Ocean.

The river rises in Nottingham as the outlet of Mendums Pond. The river flows south, passing through Nottingham Lake, and then east, where it joins the Lamprey River near the town center of Lee.

== See also ==
- List of rivers of New Hampshire
