= Wiswall Falls Mills Site =

- U.S. National Register of Historic Places
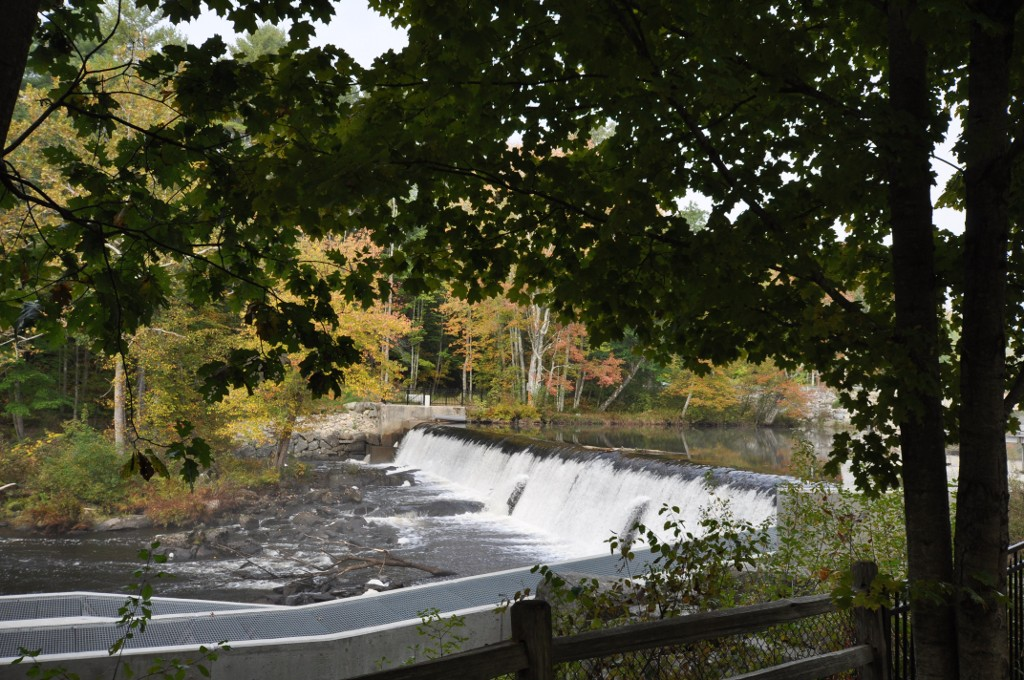
- The 1912 Wiswall Falls Dam

- Location within New Hampshire Location within the United States
- Location: John Hatch Park, south of Wiswall Road just east of the Lamprey River, Durham, New Hampshire
- Coordinates: 43°6′15″N 70°57′44″W
- Area: 3 acres (1.2 ha)
- Built by: Wiggin, Moses
- NRHP reference No.: 88000184
- Added to NRHP: March 18, 1988

The Wiswall Falls Mill Site (site 27-ST-38) is a historic archaeological industrial site in Durham, New Hampshire. It is located in John Hatch Park, a small public park just south of Wiswall Road on the eastern bank of the Lamprey River. The 3-acre (1.2 ha) site encompasses the remains of a small 19th-century mill complex that was one of Durham's major industrial sites of the 19th century until it burned in 1883. The site, which includes remains of the waterworks and foundations, was listed on the National Register of Historic Places in 1988.

== Description and history ==
The Wiswall Falls Mill Site is set in what is now a remote rural setting in western Durham. The main features of the site are the foundational remnants of a sawmill, paper mill, dam, power canal, and a variety of ancillary structures. Its most prominent features are a concrete dam, built in 1912 across the Lamprey River, and a stone-lined power canal, now partially filled in, that created a small island on the east side of the river. Just north of the present dam are the submerged remnants of a timber crib dam dating to 1835. Visible on either side of the former power canal are foundational remains of various structures.

Significant industrial activity began here in 1835, when Moses Wiggin built the timber crib dam and erected a sawmill. The power canal and paper mill were built in 1854 by Thomas Wiswall. The paper mill burned in 1883, and the sawmill was abandoned and eventually demolished after flooding breached the dam in the 1890s. The Wiswall Mill was Durham's major industrial site, other mills operating on a significantly smaller scale. The town's economy suffered generally during the second half of the 19th century, due in part to the routing of railroad infrastructure away from the village center and other potential industrial sites.

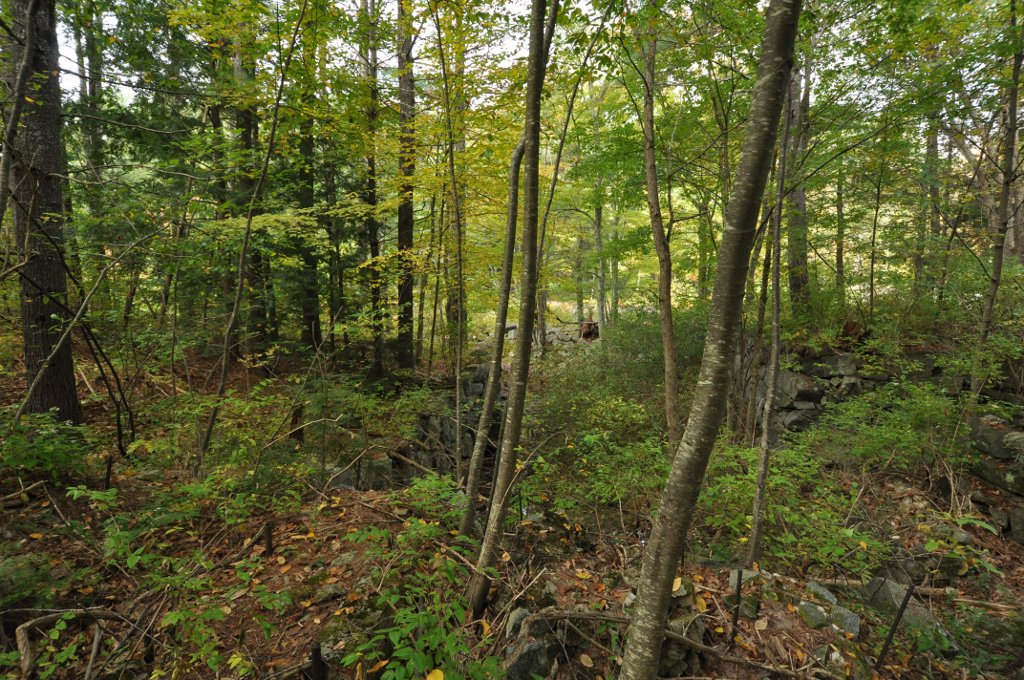
Foundation remnants at the site

The site was adapted in 1900 for the production of hydroelectric power. This included the construction in 1912 of the present concrete dam, which was done to increase the site's generating capacity. The hydropower facility was abandoned in the 1940s, and the impoundment created by the dam was later used by the town as part of its water supply. The town acquired the property in 1967, and has landscaped it to present some of the architectural remnants of the mills which operated here.

== See also ==
- National Register of Historic Places listings in Strafford County, New Hampshire
