= Piscassic River =

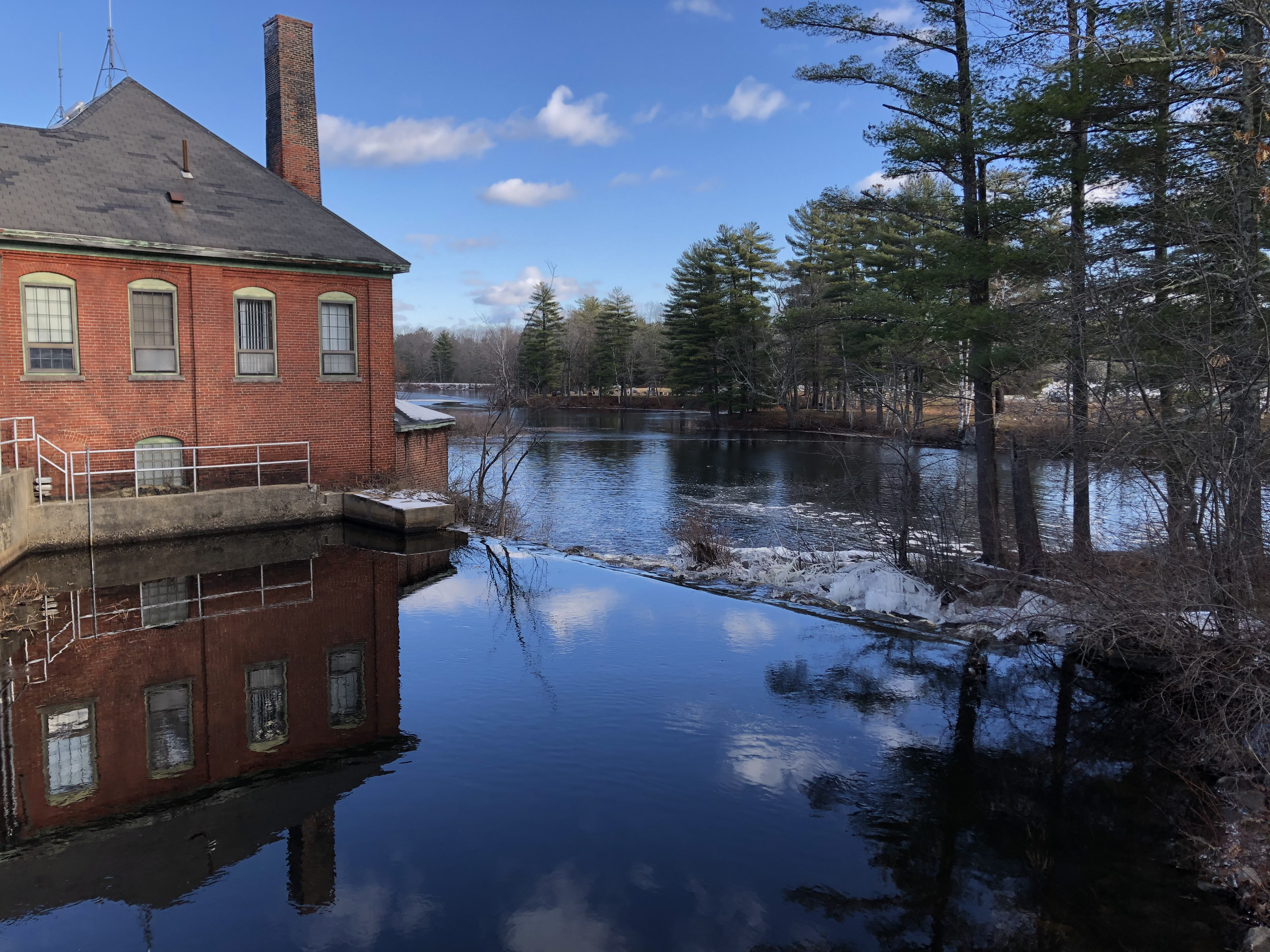
- The Piscassic in Newmarket, NH

- Location within New Hampshire Location within the United States

Location
- Country: United States
- State: New Hampshire
- County: Rockingham
- Towns: Fremont, Epping, Newfields, Newmarket

Physical characteristics
- Source
  - location: Fremont
  - coordinates: 43°0′30″N 71°6′2″W
  - elevation: 148 ft (45 m)
- Mouth: Lamprey River
  - location: Newmarket
  - coordinates: 43°5′25″N 70°56′28″W
  - elevation: 30 ft (9.1 m)
- Length: 15.3 mi (24.6 km)

Basin features
- Tributaries
  - left: Brown Brook, Folletts Brook
  - right: Fresh River

The Piscassic River is a 15.3-mile-long (24.6 km) river located in southeastern New Hampshire in the United States. It is a tributary of the Lamprey River, part of the Great Bay and Piscataqua River watershed leading to the Atlantic Ocean.

The river rises in the northeast corner of Fremont and flows east across flat, swampy terrain through the town of Epping. Upon reaching the town of Newfields, where it is joined by the Fresh River, the river turns northeast and winds through rolling terrain to Newmarket, where it reaches the Lamprey River. The Fresh River joins the Piscassic just upstream from the Piscassic Ice Pond in a marshy area of beaver ponds.

== History ==
The lower part of the Piscassic River was once used as a canal between Neal's Mills in Newfields and the mouth of the Piscassic at the Lamprey River. A small pond which was used to unload and turn barges is located at the base of a rapids just downstream from the ruins of Neal's Mills, between Piscassic Road bridge and the B&M railroad bridge in Newfields. A mule track runs along the northwest bank of the Piscassic downstream from the turning pond.

A small dam just upstream from the Piscassic Road Bridge forms the Piscassic Ice Pond. A wooden icehouse once stood adjacent to the ice pond, just east of the dam. It had a wooden and iron conveyor leading from the pond to a point a door about 15 feet above the ground. In the early 1900s the ice on the pond was often 18 inches thick. Harvesting crews used large saws to cut ice into 3–4-foot swaths. Teams of horses shod with ice shoes were used to extract and haul the ice to the conveyor. The icehouse had about 2–3 feet inner walls filled with insulating sawdust. The icehouse rotted and fell down in the 1950s and little if anything remains of it today.

== See also ==
- List of rivers of New Hampshire
