= Raymond, New Hampshire =

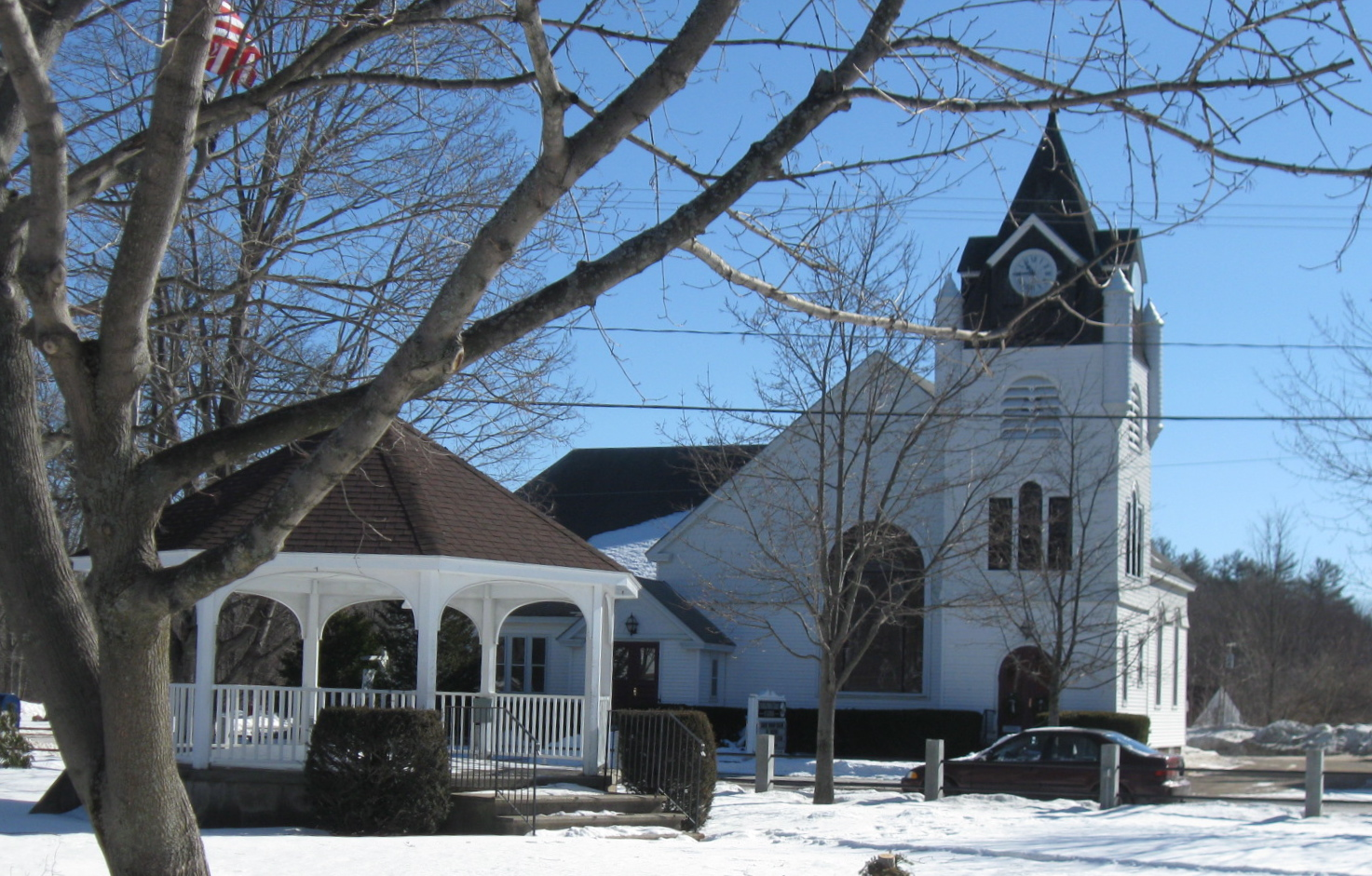
- The Common (Lyman Memorial Park), 2013

- Seal

- Location in Rockingham County and the state of New Hampshire.
- Coordinates: 43°01′56″N 71°11′58″W
- Country: United States
- State: New Hampshire
- County: Rockingham
- Incorporated: 1764

Area
  - Total: 29.6 sq mi (76.7 km^{2})
  - Land: 28.8 sq mi (74.6 km^{2})
  - Water: 0.81 sq mi (2.1 km^{2}) 2.68%
- Elevation: 210 ft (64 m)

Population (2020)
  - Total: 10,684
  - Density: 371/sq mi (143.1/km^{2})
- Time zone: UTC-5 (Eastern)
  - Summer (DST): UTC-4 (Eastern)
- ZIP code: 03077
- Area code: 603
- FIPS code: 33-64020
- GNIS feature ID: 873705
- Website: www.raymondnh.gov

Raymond is a town in Rockingham County, New Hampshire, United States. The population was 10,684 at the 2020 census. Part of Pawtuckaway State Park is in the north.

The main village in town, where 3,738 people resided at the 2020 census, is defined as the Raymond census-designated place (CDP), and is located along the Lamprey River near New Hampshire Route 27.

== History ==
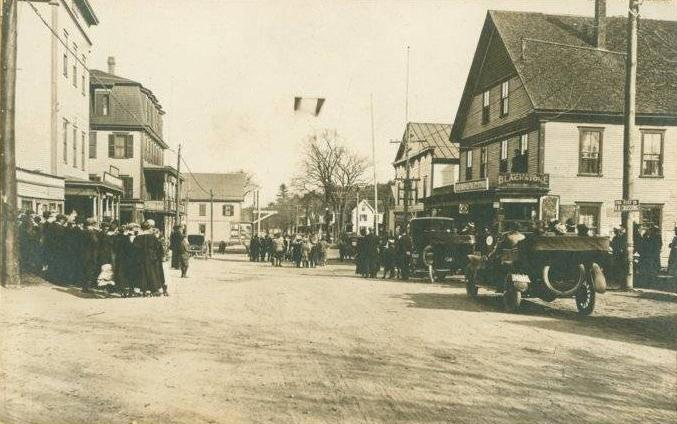
Main Street c. 1918

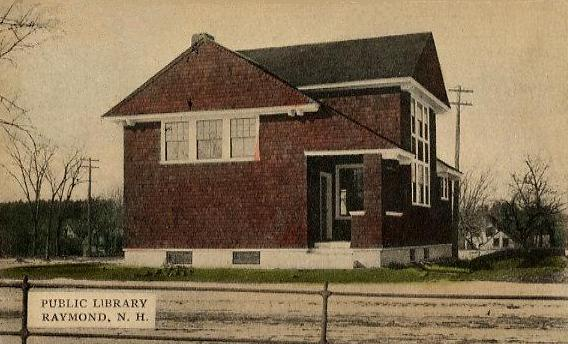
Dudley-Tucker Library in 1908, the year it opened

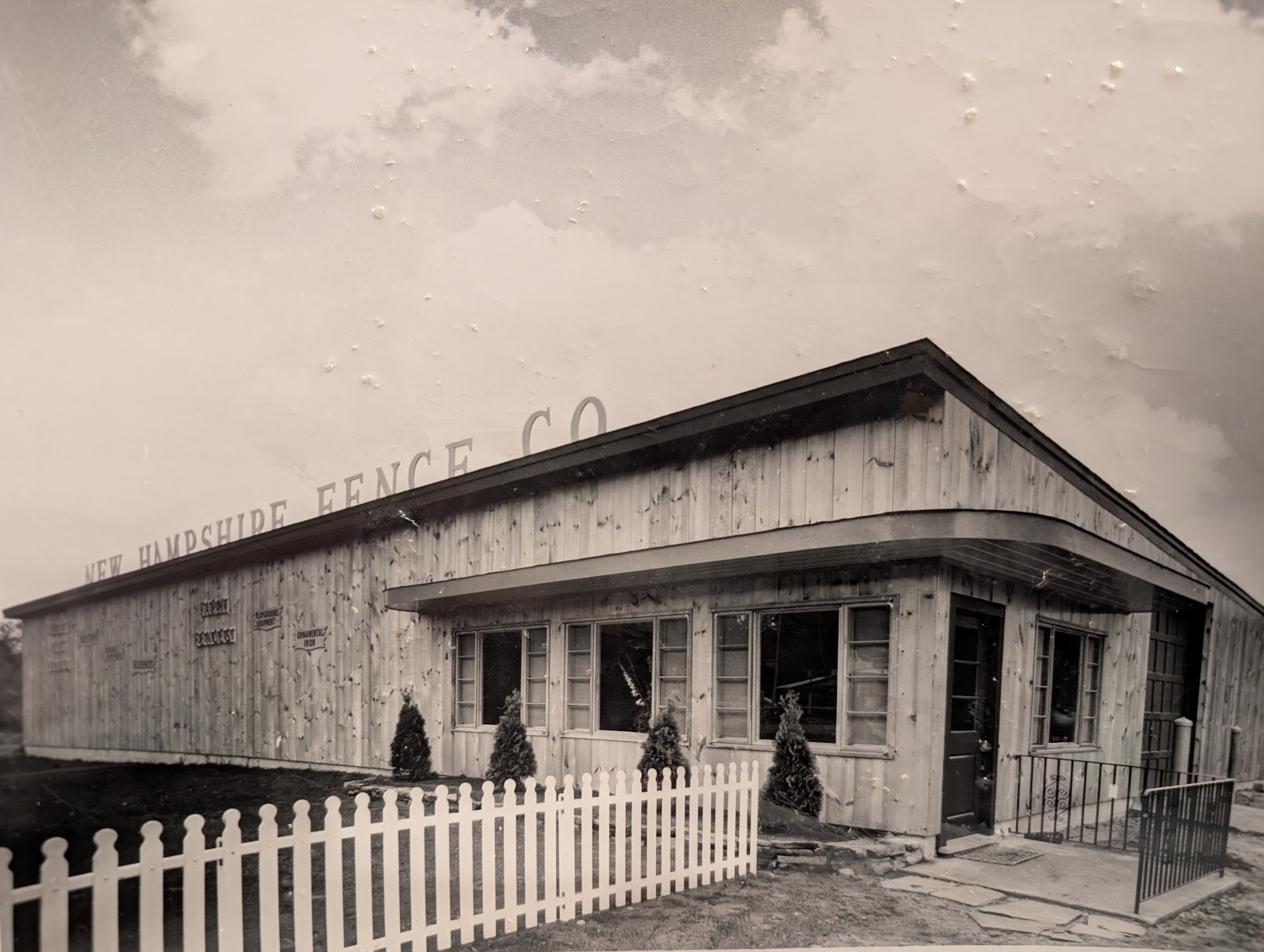
The New Hampshire Fence Company in Raymond; present location of the Tuckaway Tavern

The town was first settled by families from Exeter as a parish of Chester, and known as "Freetown".

Joseph Fullonton, in his History of Raymond, published 1875, said that the name was chosen as "a new and classical one". Fullonton relates that the original name of Freetown "arose from the ship timber business" where the king claimed the best trees. The locals had other ideas and took the trees and "being successful here, none molesting, they called it Freetown." Fullonton states that at incorporation in 1764, changing the name from "Freetown" to "Raymond" was "taking a new and classical one, shows that there are minds not disposed to tread all the time in one path, but capable of thinking and advancing," and that the word "Raymond" means "the lustrous, luminous or shining world."

In 1906, Andrew Carnegie awarded a grant of $2,000 toward the construction of a Carnegie library in Raymond, and in 1908 the Dudley-Tucker Library opened overlooking the Common.

The Concord and Portsmouth Railroad line from Concord to Portsmouth reached Raymond in 1850. In 1862 the alignment was altered, rerouting trains to Manchester rather than Concord. However, freight and passenger trains still originated in Concord and traveled south on the New Hampshire Division Main Line before entering the Portsmouth Branch at Manchester. The line later became the Portsmouth Branch of the Boston and Maine Railroad. Passenger service ended in 1954, with mixed train service continuing until 1960. Local freight service continued regularly until 1972 and as-needed afterwards, usually once or twice a week. A large gravel pit located near Onway Lake was a busy railroad customer until closing in 1971, as was the Regis Tannery downtown until a fire the same year. There were no regular rail customers in Raymond from 1971 until 1976, when Rehrig Pacific opened a plastics injection plant near Route 102. The last train served Raymond on July 31, 1980, and the tracks through town were abandoned in 1982 and removed between 1983 and 1985. The line is now a rail trail, and the restored depot survives today as home to the Raymond Historical Society.

New Hampshire Historical Marker #273 in Raymond recognizes Frank J. Mafera, a resident who patented the first method for weaving chain link fencing in 1930, and then founded the Barnyard Fence Company (later renamed the New Hampshire Fence Company) in Raymond.

== Geography ==
According to the United States Census Bureau, the town has a total area of 29.6 square miles (76.7 km^{2}), of which 28.8 square miles (74.6 km^{2}) are land and 0.81 square miles (2.1 km^{2}) are water, comprising 2.68% of the town. Raymond is drained by the Lamprey River and the Exeter River, both part of the Piscataqua River watershed. The highest point in town is Dumplingtown Hill, at 625 feet (191 m) above sea level, located near the town's western border.

The town is crossed by state routes 27, 101, 102, 107, and 156.

== Demographics ==
Historical population
Census	Pop.	Note	%±
1790	727		—
1800	808		11.1%
1810	898		11.1%
1820	961		7.0%
1830	1,000		4.1%
1840	989		−1.1%
1850	1,256		27.0%
1860	1,269		1.0%
1870	1,121		−11.7%
1880	1,053		−6.1%
1890	1,131		7.4%
1900	1,100		−2.7%
1910	1,203		9.4%
1920	1,050		−12.7%
1930	1,165		11.0%
1940	1,340		15.0%
1950	1,428		6.6%
1960	1,867		30.7%
1970	3,003		60.8%
1980	5,453		81.6%
1990	8,713		59.8%
2000	9,674		11.0%
2010	10,138		4.8%
2020	10,684		5.4%
U.S. Decennial Census

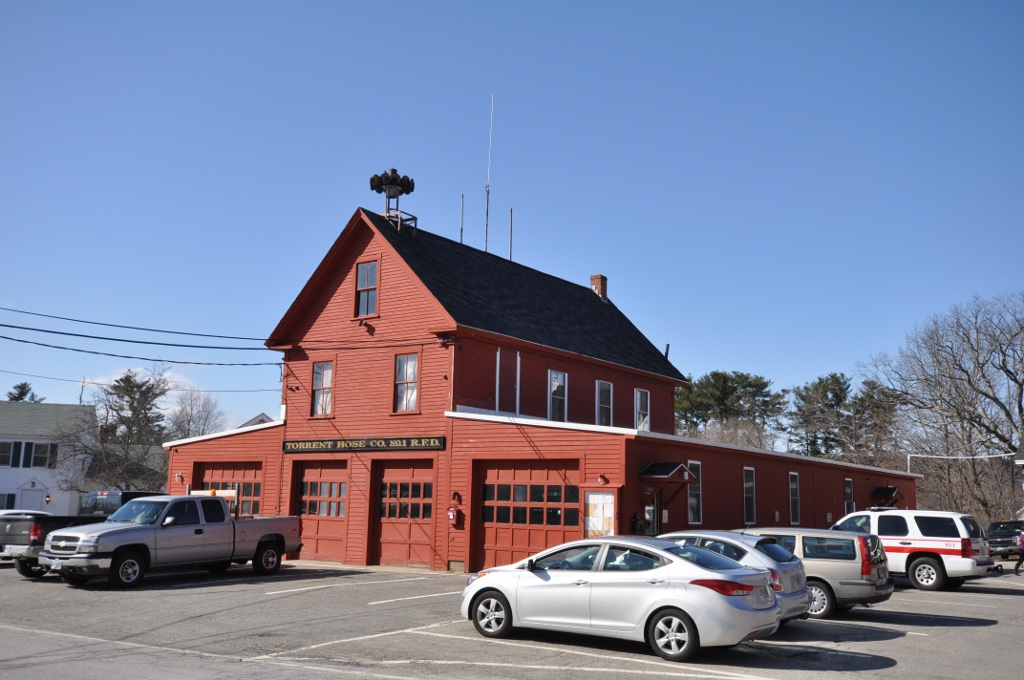
The Torrent Hose Company (fire station) in the town center

As of the census of 2010, there were 10,138 people, 3,925 households, and 2,796 families residing in the town. There were 4,254 housing units, of which 329, or 7.7%, were vacant. The racial makeup of the town was 97.0% white, 0.7% African American, 0.2% Native American, 0.6% Asian, 0.01% Native Hawaiian or Pacific Islander, 0.2% some other race, and 1.4% from two or more races. 1.1% of the population were Hispanic or Latino of any race.

Of the 3,925 households, 32.3% had children under the age of 18 living with them, 55.7% were headed by married couples living together, 9.8% had a female householder with no husband present, and 28.8% were non-families. 20.8% of all households were made up of individuals, and 6.5% were someone living alone who was 65 years of age or older. The average household size was 2.58, and the average family size was 2.98.

In the town, 21.7% of the population were under the age of 18, 8.5% were from 18 to 24, 27.5% from 25 to 44, 32.7% from 45 to 64, and 9.5% were 65 years of age or older. The median age was 39.9 years. For every 100 females, there were 100.5 males. For every 100 females age 18 and over, there were 100.4 males.

For the period 2011–2015, the estimated median annual income for a household was $64,490, and the median income for a family was $77,345. Male full-time workers had a median income of $52,104 versus $34,484 for females. The per capita income for the town was $29,476. 6.9% of the population and 3.6% of families were below the poverty line. 7.2% of the population under the age of 18 and 5.8% of those 65 or older were living in poverty.

== Education ==
The town is home to the Raymond High School.

== Notable people ==
- Chris Carpenter (b.1975), former baseball pitcher for the St. Louis Cardinals, raised in town
- Frank J. Mafera (1898–1956), inventor of residential chain link fencing
