= North River (New Hampshire) =

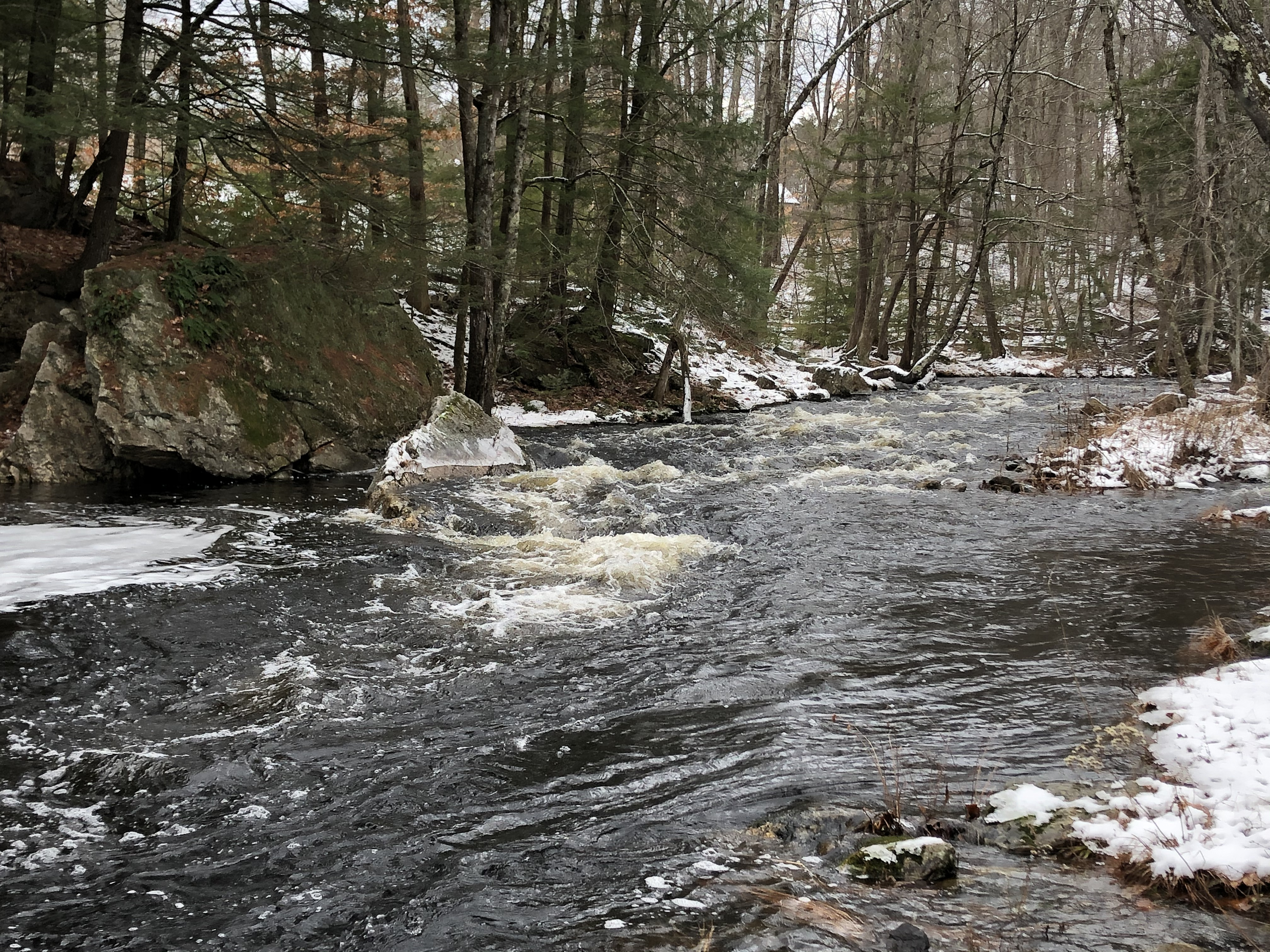
- The North River at McCrillis Road in Nottingham, NH

- Location within New Hampshire Location within the United States

Location
- Country: United States
- State: New Hampshire
- Counties: Rockingham, Strafford
- Towns: Nottingham, Lee, Epping

Physical characteristics
- Source: North River Pond
  - location: Nottingham
  - coordinates: 43°11′32″N 71°7′52″W
  - elevation: 451 ft (137 m)
- Mouth: Lamprey River
  - location: Epping
  - coordinates: 43°4′45″N 71°1′12″W
  - elevation: 85 ft (26 m)
- Length: 15.1 mi (24.3 km)

Basin features
- Tributaries
  - right: Bean River, Rollins Brook

The North River is a 15.1-mile-long (24.3 km) river located in southeastern New Hampshire in the United States. It is a tributary of the Lamprey River, part of the Great Bay and Piscataqua River watershed leading to the Atlantic Ocean.

The river begins at the outlet of North River Pond in the northern corner of Nottingham, New Hampshire. It flows southeast through hilly, wooded terrain, crossing the entire town of Nottingham, the southwest corner of Lee, and a northern part of Epping, where it joins the Lamprey. A major tributary of the North River is the Bean River, which joins from the west in the center part of Nottingham.

== See also ==
- List of rivers of New Hampshire
