= Epping, New Hampshire =

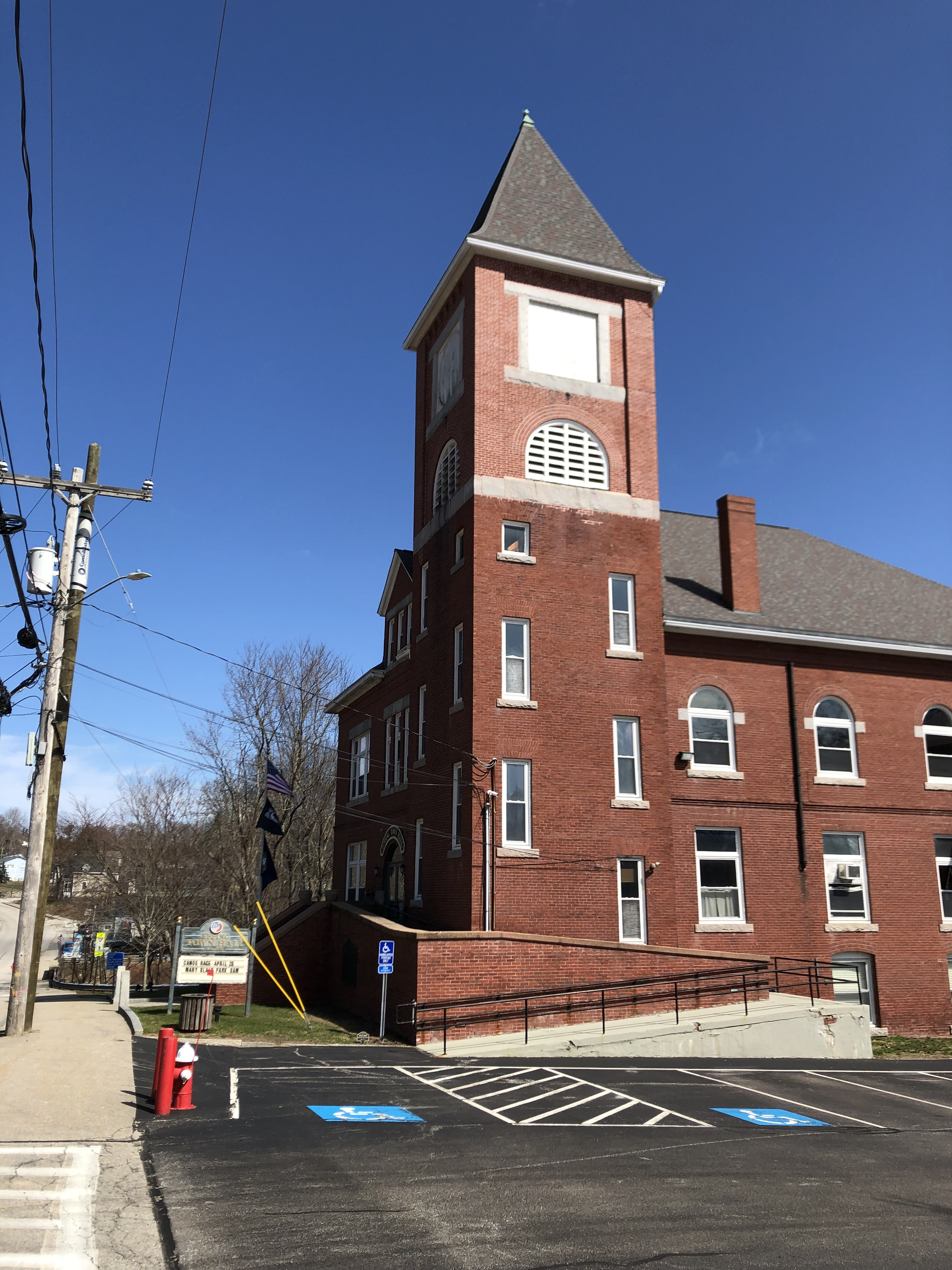
- Town Hall

- Seal
- Nicknames: "Home of Three Governors" "The Center of the Universe"
- Location in Rockingham County and the state of New Hampshire.
- Coordinates: 43°02′00″N 71°04′27″W
- Country: United States
- State: New Hampshire
- County: Rockingham
- Incorporated: 1741
- Villages: Epping; Camp Hedding; West Epping

Area
  - Total: 26.2 sq mi (67.9 km^{2})
  - Land: 26.0 sq mi (67.4 km^{2})
  - Water: 0.19 sq mi (0.5 km^{2})
- Elevation: 157 ft (48 m)

Population (2020)
  - Total: 7,125
  - Density: 274/sq mi (105.7/km^{2})
- Time zone: UTC-5 (EST)
  - Summer (DST): UTC-4 (EDT)
- ZIP code: 03042
- Area code: 603
- FIPS code: 33-24660
- GNIS feature ID: 873591
- Website: www.eppingnh.gov

Epping is a town in Rockingham County, New Hampshire, United States. The population was 7,125 at the 2020 census, up from 6,411 at the 2010 census.

The main village, where 2,693 people resided at the 2020 census, is defined by the U.S. Census Bureau as the Epping census-designated place (CDP), along New Hampshire Route 27 just west of New Hampshire Route 125.

== History ==
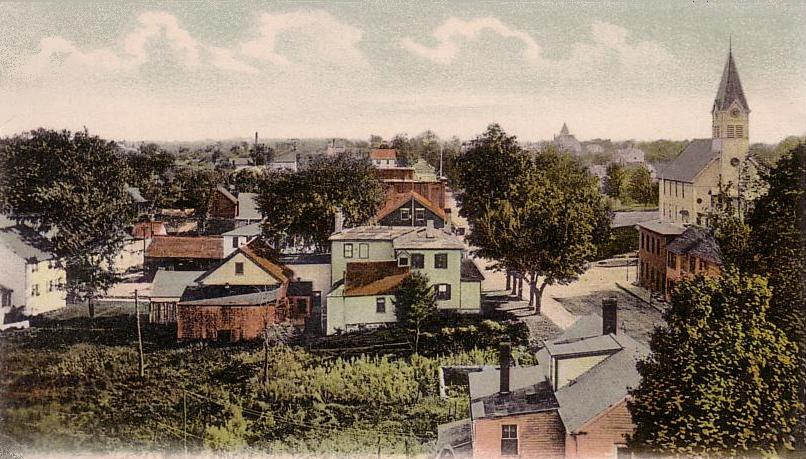
Bird's-eye view in 1906

Epping was originally part of Exeter, one of the four original New Hampshire townships. In 1690, during King William's War, the Lamprey River Raid occurred in which eight people were killed and one person captured. Starting in 1710, Exeter awarded free wood lots in the area to encourage settlement. In 1741, Epping was granted a charter and incorporated as a town. It was the last New Hampshire town chartered by Governor Jonathan Belcher before the Province of New Hampshire was granted a governor who did not also govern the neighboring Province of Massachusetts Bay. Epping was named for Epping in England.

Through the 1800s, farming was a principal occupation in Epping. The town also had substantial reserves of clay, long used by local residents to make bricks, and in 1840, the first commercial brickyard was established in Epping.

The village once known as East Epping gave birth in 1863 to a Methodist camp called Camp Hedding. Hedding CMA (Camp Meeting Association) hosted Methodist revivals. Hedding became the name of a post office and railroad station in 1896, and the place name appears on road signs.

Epping was once an important junction of the Worcester, Nashua & Rochester Railroad and the Portsmouth & Concord Railroad, later both part of the Boston & Maine Railroad. The north-south WN&R line through town was abandoned in 1932, with a short segment remaining in place south to Fremont to serve a lumber yard and barrel manufacturer located there. This left the east-west Portsmouth Branch between Manchester and Portsmouth as Epping's only access to the national rail network.

Passenger service on the Portsmouth Branch ceased in 1954, although mixed-train service continued until 1960. A regular freight running from Concord to Portsmouth and return served Epping until 1972, after which a local freight out of Concord served the branch as needed, usually once or twice a week and often not passing beyond Epping where the last concentration of customers was located. Customers in Epping at this time included the Merrimack Farmers Exchange and the W.S. Goodrich brickyard. Occasional hi-and-wide freight movements operated over the Portsmouth Branch in the 1970s due to the lack of close clearance points, with several carrying materials destined to the under-construction Seabrook Station Nuclear Power Plant. Declining track conditions led to the B&M embargoing the branch in December 1979, with the last trains operating to Epping earlier that year and the final train to Raymond following in July 1980 despite the embargo. The Boston & Maine abandoned the track from East Manchester to Newfields in 1982, and the rail was removed in Epping between 1983 and 1985. The railroad beds are now the Rockingham Recreational Trail. Abutments for the WN&R bridge over the Lamprey River can be seen to the west of Route 125.

== Geography ==
exits serving Epping
| Exit 6 | Depot Road (Beede Hill Road in Fremont) |
| Exit 7 | (commercial zone and downtown) |
| Exit 8 | North Road to (racetracks) |

A chronic quip about "Epping—the center of the universe" remains visible on bumper stickers. However, due to its location at the crossroads of Route 101 and Route 125, the town has indeed become a retail center serving the neighboring towns. It has attracted chain stores since Route 101 was upgraded to an expressway in the mid-1990s, with strip malls and big-box stores arriving in the 2010s.

The town also has a traditional center clustered around Main Street and Route 27, an older road connecting Exeter with Hooksett and Manchester. These parts of town retain their traditional architecture.

The area on Route 27 near the Raymond border is known as West Epping.

The town has a total area of 26.2 square miles (67.9 km^{2}), of which 26.0 square miles (67.4 km^{2}) are land and 0.2 square miles (0.5 km^{2}) are water, comprising 0.70% of the town. Epping is drained by the Lamprey and Piscassic rivers. The highest point in Epping is Kennard Hill at 472 feet (144 m) above sea level, located in the town's northwest corner. Epping lies fully within the Piscataqua River (Coastal) watershed.

The town center, defined as the Epping census-designated place (CDP), has a total area of 2.7 square miles (7.0 km^{2}), all land.

== Climate ==
According to the Köppen Climate Classification system, Epping has a warm-summer humid continental climate, abbreviated "Dfb" on climate maps. The hottest temperature recorded in Epping was 100 °F (37.8 °C) on August 2, 1975, while the coldest temperature recorded was −29 °F (−33.9 °C) on February 3, 1971.

Climate data for Epping, New Hampshire, 1991–2020 normals, extremes 1963–present
| Month | Jan | Feb | Mar | Apr | May | Jun | Jul | Aug | Sep | Oct | Nov | Dec | Year |
|---|---|---|---|---|---|---|---|---|---|---|---|---|---|
| Record high °F (°C) | 69 (21) | 75 (24) | 89 (32) | 92 (33) | 94 (34) | 96 (36) | 99 (37) | 100 (38) | 95 (35) | 85 (29) | 78 (26) | 76 (24) | 100 (38) |
| Mean maximum °F (°C) | 54.0 (12.2) | 56.3 (13.5) | 66.0 (18.9) | 80.4 (26.9) | 88.2 (31.2) | 91.6 (33.1) | 92.9 (33.8) | 91.5 (33.1) | 88.1 (31.2) | 78.4 (25.8) | 68.9 (20.5) | 57.9 (14.4) | 94.9 (34.9) |
| Mean daily maximum °F (°C) | 32.7 (0.4) | 35.5 (1.9) | 43.9 (6.6) | 56.7 (13.7) | 67.7 (19.8) | 76.4 (24.7) | 82.0 (27.8) | 80.8 (27.1) | 73.1 (22.8) | 60.7 (15.9) | 48.9 (9.4) | 37.9 (3.3) | 58.0 (14.5) |
| Daily mean °F (°C) | 23.5 (−4.7) | 25.6 (−3.6) | 33.9 (1.1) | 45.4 (7.4) | 56.0 (13.3) | 65.1 (18.4) | 70.7 (21.5) | 69.1 (20.6) | 61.5 (16.4) | 49.5 (9.7) | 39.4 (4.1) | 29.4 (−1.4) | 47.4 (8.6) |
| Mean daily minimum °F (°C) | 14.3 (−9.8) | 15.8 (−9.0) | 24.0 (−4.4) | 34.0 (1.1) | 44.4 (6.9) | 53.8 (12.1) | 59.4 (15.2) | 57.4 (14.1) | 49.8 (9.9) | 38.4 (3.6) | 29.9 (−1.2) | 20.9 (−6.2) | 36.8 (2.7) |
| Mean minimum °F (°C) | −6.2 (−21.2) | −4.1 (−20.1) | 3.7 (−15.7) | 22.0 (−5.6) | 30.3 (−0.9) | 40.5 (4.7) | 48.6 (9.2) | 46.2 (7.9) | 33.4 (0.8) | 24.5 (−4.2) | 14.6 (−9.7) | 2.7 (−16.3) | −9.7 (−23.2) |
| Record low °F (°C) | −28 (−33) | −29 (−34) | −11 (−24) | 8 (−13) | 18 (−8) | 32 (0) | 37 (3) | 30 (−1) | 21 (−6) | 12 (−11) | −5 (−21) | −22 (−30) | −29 (−34) |
| Average precipitation inches (mm) | 3.15 (80) | 3.27 (83) | 4.23 (107) | 4.24 (108) | 3.76 (96) | 4.00 (102) | 3.46 (88) | 3.53 (90) | 3.96 (101) | 4.68 (119) | 3.74 (95) | 4.28 (109) | 46.30 (1,176) |
| Average snowfall inches (cm) | 15.2 (39) | 13.9 (35) | 9.9 (25) | 2.8 (7.1) | 0.0 (0.0) | 0.0 (0.0) | 0.0 (0.0) | 0.0 (0.0) | 0.0 (0.0) | 0.1 (0.25) | 1.6 (4.1) | 13.1 (33) | 56.6 (143.45) |
| Average extreme snow depth inches (cm) | 11.2 (28) | 12.2 (31) | 12.3 (31) | 2.6 (6.6) | 0.0 (0.0) | 0.0 (0.0) | 0.0 (0.0) | 0.0 (0.0) | 0.0 (0.0) | 0.2 (0.51) | 1.3 (3.3) | 8.1 (21) | 17.2 (44) |
| Average precipitation days (≥ 0.01 in) | 10.0 | 7.8 | 9.7 | 10.9 | 11.0 | 11.5 | 10.1 | 8.9 | 8.8 | 10.3 | 10.0 | 10.8 | 119.8 |
| Average snowy days (≥ 0.1 in) | 5.6 | 4.6 | 3.4 | 0.7 | 0.0 | 0.0 | 0.0 | 0.0 | 0.0 | 0.1 | 0.9 | 4.0 | 19.3 |
Source 1: NOAA
Source 2: National Weather Service

=== Adjacent municipalities ===
- Lee (northeast)
- Newmarket (east)
- Newfields (east)
- Exeter (southeast)
- Brentwood (southeast)
- Fremont (southwest)
- Raymond (west)
- Nottingham (northwest)

== Culture ==
There are two auto racing venues in Epping. New England Dragway, New England's only quarter-mile track, runs races Wednesday and Friday nights and all day on the weekends, including the IHRA Amalie Oil North American Nationals and, since 2013, the NHRA New England Nationals. The dragway hosts a popular Halloween display during the second half of October. Star Speedway is a NASCAR stock-car oval operating on Saturdays.

An annual canoe race down the Lamprey River occurs on the last weekend in April. Camp Hedding hosts an annual camp meeting for one week in August and an "olde time fair" on the first Saturday of August every year.

Epping has two annual parades, the memorial parade and the Christmas parade. The memorial parade usually includes youth sports teams, scouts, the combined middle and high school marching band, the fire department, police department, and veterans. The Christmas parade includes a few fire trucks and police cars that go around town with a Santa Claus character and his elves throwing candy to any children who are outside.

== Demographics ==
Historical population
| Census | Pop. | Note | %± |
|---|---|---|---|
| 1790 | 1,233 | | — |
| 1800 | 1,121 | | −9.1% |
| 1810 | 1,182 | | 5.4% |
| 1820 | 1,158 | | −2.0% |
| 1830 | 1,263 | | 9.1% |
| 1840 | 1,234 | | −2.3% |
| 1850 | 1,663 | | 34.8% |
| 1860 | 1,414 | | −15.0% |
| 1870 | 1,270 | | −10.2% |
| 1880 | 1,536 | | 20.9% |
| 1890 | 1,721 | | 12.0% |
| 1900 | 1,641 | | −4.6% |
| 1910 | 1,649 | | 0.5% |
| 1920 | 1,276 | | −22.6% |
| 1930 | 1,672 | | 31.0% |
| 1940 | 1,618 | | −3.2% |
| 1950 | 1,796 | | 11.0% |
| 1960 | 2,006 | | 11.7% |
| 1970 | 2,356 | | 17.4% |
| 1980 | 3,460 | | 46.9% |
| 1990 | 5,549 | | 60.4% |
| 2000 | 5,476 | | −1.3% |
| 2010 | 6,411 | | 17.1% |
| 2020 | 7,125 | | 11.1% |
U.S. Decennial Census

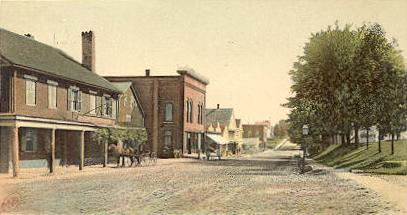
Main Street in 1905

As of the census of 2010, there were 6,411 people, 2,466 households, and 1,768 families residing in the town. There were 2,723 housing units, of which 257, or 9.4%, were vacant. The racial makeup of the town was 96.2% white, 0.3% African American, 0.2% Native American, 1.3% Asian, 0.03% Native Hawaiian or Pacific Islander, 0.3% some other race, and 1.6% from two or more races. 1.6% of the population were Hispanic or Latino of any race.

Of the 2,466 households, 34.4% had children under the age of 18 living with them, 57.5% were headed by married couples living together, 9.0% had a female householder with no husband present, and 28.3% were non-families. 20.3% of all households were made up of individuals, and 6.5% were someone living alone who was 65 years of age or older. The average household size was 2.60, and the average family size was 2.99.

In the town, 22.8% of the population were under the age of 18, 7.6% were from 18 to 24, 28.6% from 25 to 44, 30.5% from 45 to 64, and 10.5% were 65 years of age or older. The median age was 40.0 years. For every 100 females, there were 96.8 males. For every 100 females age 18 and over, there were 94.2 males.

For the period 2011–2015, the estimated median annual income for a household was $77,750, and the median income for a family was $86,886. Male full-time workers had a median income of $66,330 versus $47,538 for females. The per capita income for the town was $34,982. 6.3% of the population and 3.3% of families were below the poverty line. 12.1% of the population under the age of 18 and 1.5% of those 65 or older were living in poverty.

== Notable people ==
The men who inspired the town nickname of "Home of Three Governors" are the following:

- William Plumer (1759–1850), US senator; 11th and 13th governor of New Hampshire (1812–1813 / 1816–1819)
- David L. Morril (1772–1849), US senator; 16th governor of New Hampshire (1824–1827)
- Benjamin Franklin Prescott (1833–1895), 36th governor of New Hampshire (1877–1879)

Plumer and Prescott roads honor two of the governors.

Other notable residents include:

- Kerry Bascom (born 1969), forward and coach with the University of Connecticut women's basketball team
- Carl Stearns Clancy (1890–1971), first person to circumnavigate the globe on a motorcycle
- Henry Dearborn (1751–1829), Revolutionary War officer and US Secretary of War
- Sheila LaBarre (born 1958), convicted murderer
- B. G. Plumer (1830–1886), businessman, farmer, politician
- Daniel L. Plumer (1837–1920), Wisconsin politician and businessman
