= Lamprey River =

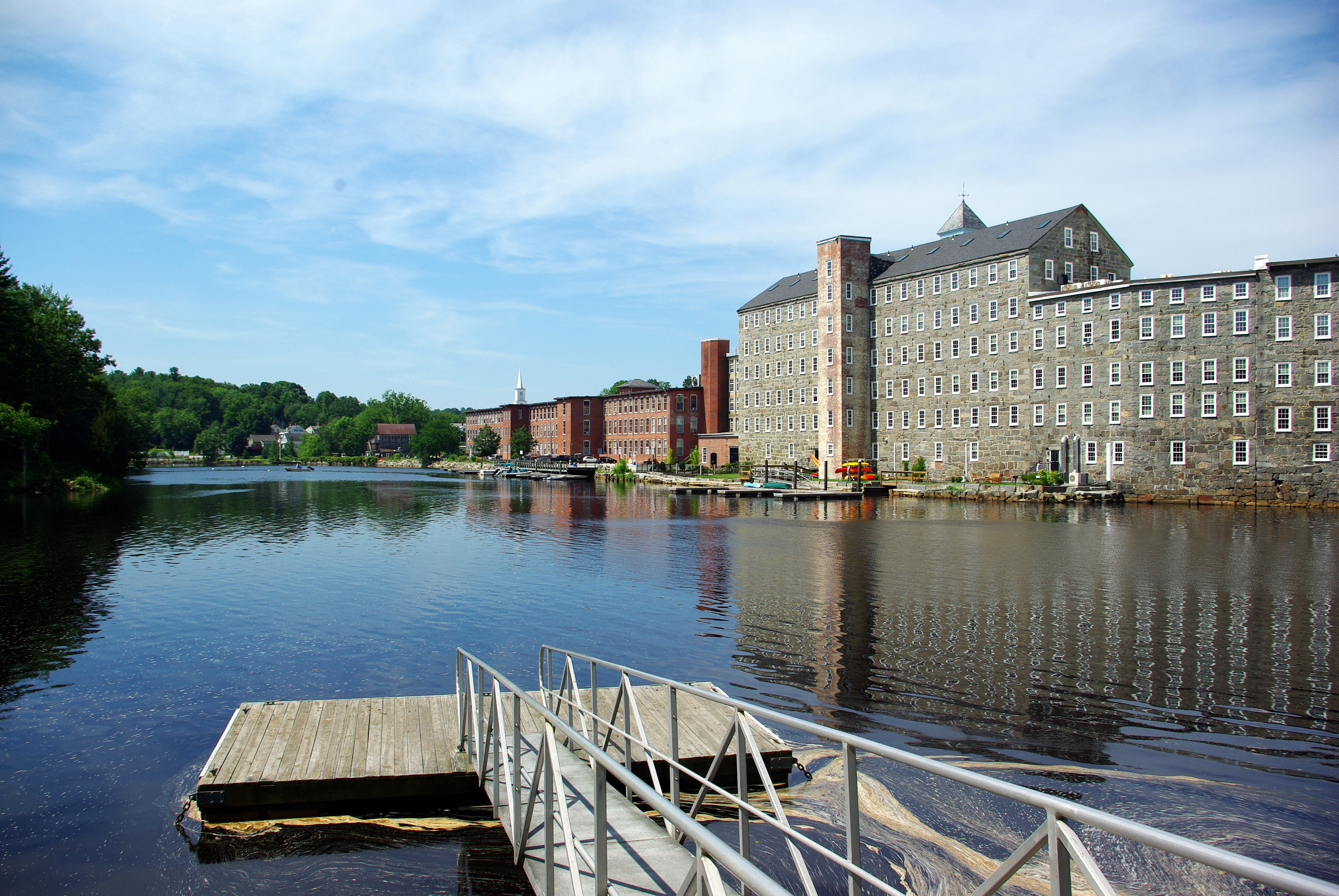
- Lamprey River in Newmarket, New Hampshire

- Location within New Hampshire Location within the United States

Location
- Country: United States
- State: New Hampshire
- District: Rockingham County
- Municipalities: Northwood, Deerfield, Raymond, Epping, Lee, Durham, Newmarket

Physical characteristics
- Source: Meadow Lake
  - location: Northwood
  - coordinates: 43°12′3″N 71°12′19″W
  - elevation: 594 ft (181 m)
- Mouth: Great Bay
  - location: Newmarket
  - coordinates: 43°3′54″N 70°54′20″W
  - elevation: 0 ft (0 m)
- Length: 50.2 mi (80.8 km)

Basin features
- Tributaries
  - left: Pawtuckaway River, North River, Little River
  - right: North Branch River, Piscassic River

National Wild and Scenic River
- Type: Recreational
- Designated: November 12, 1996

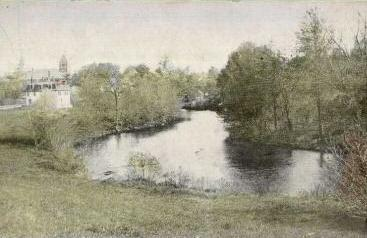
Lamprey River c. 1920, Epping, New Hampshire

The Lamprey River is a 50.2-mile-long (80.8 km) river in southeastern New Hampshire, the United States. It rises in Meadow Lake in Northwood, and flows south through Deerfield, then generally east through Raymond, Epping, Lee, Durham and finally Newmarket. Here, it meets Great Bay, a tidal inlet of the Atlantic Ocean, to which it is connected by a tidal estuary, the Piscataqua River. The river from the Bunker Pond Dam in Epping to the confluence with the Piscassic River is part of the designated National Wild and Scenic River System.

== History ==
Segments of the river are rich in history. Saw- and gristmills which operated by water power were common along the river. The Wiswall Falls Mills Site in Durham is on the National Register of Historic Places. Originally a sawmill, the site was used subsequently to make knives, nuts and bolts, pitchforks, carriages, matches and wallpaper. Sites such as Wadleigh Falls show the remnants of old mills and the rich river culture that used to be. Located in Lee, the falls is the remains of a dam created to power a mill which fed a 150-acre (61 ha) mill pond at one point.

== Wildlife ==
The shoreline of the Lamprey River, its floodplain and its wetlands provide a wide range of valuable wildlife habitats. Its anadromous fishery is one of the strongest in the Great Bay watershed. Such fish species that use the Lamprey River include shad, river herring, smelt and even Atlantic salmon. These fish are hatched in the river, then spend most of their lives out at sea, returning to the river to spawn. With the construction in 2012 of a fish ladder at Wiswall Dam in Durham, the fish species are able to move up the river as far as Wadleigh Falls Dam in Lee.

The river is also rich in species of freshwater mussels. The river is managed by the New Hampshire Fish and Game Department for several different types of game fish, including brook trout which is native to the river. Rainbow trout and brown trout are also stocked in many parts of the river but are not native to the area.

Lampreys are also present in the river. However, the Lamprey River derives its name from an early settler who lived in the area, John Lamprey, rather than the fish itself.

== Setting ==
Along the banks are hardwood forests and numerous farms. The area is under pressure from suburban development as one of the fastest-growing areas in New England. There is a strong local culture surrounding the Lamprey River with several local events held on the river, including numerous town-run fishing derbies and the Lamprey River Canoe Race held annually in Epping.

During the course of its journey from the Saddleback Mountains in Northwood down to Newmarket, the Lamprey changes from a small torrential stream to a small tidal river. The river between these points has slow meanders and rapids, and small waterfalls such as Packers Falls in Durham.

== See also ==
- List of rivers of New Hampshire
