= List of New Hampshire state parks =

Map of New Hampshire state parks

This is a list of New Hampshire state parks. State parks in the U.S. state of New Hampshire are overseen by the New Hampshire Division of Parks and Recreation.

== New Hampshire state parks ==
Name	County	Town	Size	Estab- lished	Image
Ahern State Park	Belknap	Laconia	128 acres (52 ha)	1994	
Androscoggin Wayside Park	Coös	Errol	1 acre (0.40 ha)	1958	
Bear Brook State Park	Merrimack	Allenstown	10,083 acres (4,080 ha)	1943	
Beaver Brook Falls Wayside	Coös	Colebrook	7.3 acres (3.0 ha)		
Cardigan Mountain State Park	Grafton	Orange	5,655 acres (2,288 ha)	1939	
Chesterfield Gorge Natural Area	Cheshire	Chesterfield	13 acres (5.3 ha)	1948	
Clough State Park	Hillsborough	Weare		1964	
Coleman State Park	Coös	Stewartstown	1,573 acres (637 ha)	1956	
Crawford Notch State Park	Carroll	Hart's Location	5,775 acres (2,337 ha)	1913	
Deer Mountain Campground	Coös	Pittsburg			
Dixville Notch State Park	Coös	Dixville	127 acres (51 ha)		
Echo Lake State Park	Carroll	Conway	118 acres (48 ha)		
Eisenhower Memorial Wayside Park	Coös	Crawford's Purchase	7 acres (2.8 ha)	1979	
Ellacoya State Park	Belknap	Gilford	82 acres (33 ha)	1956	
Forest Lake State Park	Coös	Dalton	397 acres (161 ha)	1935	
Franconia Notch State Park	Grafton	Franconia	6,692.8 acres (2,708.5 ha)	1928	
Gardner Memorial Wayside Park	Sullivan	Springfield		1980	
Greenfield State Park	Hillsborough	Greenfield	400 acres (160 ha)		
Hampton Beach State Park	Rockingham	Hampton	50 acres (20 ha)	1933	
Jenness State Beach	Rockingham	Rye	1.3 acres (0.53 ha)	1980	
Jericho Mountain State Park	Coös	Berlin	7,430 acres (3,010 ha)	2005	
Kingston State Park	Rockingham	Kingston	44 acres (18 ha)		
Lake Francis State Park	Coös	Pittsburg	38 acres (15 ha)	1976	
Lake Tarleton State Park	Grafton	Piermont	48 acres (19 ha)		
Madison Boulder Natural Area	Carroll	Madison	17 acres (6.9 ha)	1946	
Milan Hill State Park	Coös	Milan	102 acres (41 ha)	1939	
Miller State Park	Hillsborough	Peterborough	533 acres (216 ha)	1891	
Mollidgewock State Park	Coös	Errol	46 acres (19 ha)	1972	
Monadnock State Park	Cheshire	Jaffrey	1,017 acres (412 ha)		
Moose Brook State Park	Coös	Gorham	755 acres (306 ha)	1936	
Mount Sunapee State Park	Merrimack	Newbury	2,893 acres (1,171 ha)	1948	
Mount Washington State Park	Coös	Sargent's Purchase	60.3 acres (24.4 ha)	1964	
Nansen Wayside Park	Coös	Milan	14 acres (5.7 ha)		
North Hampton State Beach	Rockingham	North Hampton	1.1 acres (0.45 ha)	1980	
Northwood Meadows State Park	Rockingham	Northwood	674.5 acres (273.0 ha)	1990	
Odiorne Point State Park	Rockingham	Rye	333.7 acres (135.0 ha)	1961	
Pawtuckaway State Park	Rockingham	Nottingham	5,536.1 acres (2,240.4 ha)		
Pillsbury State Park	Sullivan	Washington	4,456 acres (1,803 ha)		
Pisgah State Park	Cheshire	Chesterfield	13,361 acres (5,407 ha)	1967	
Rhododendron State Park	Cheshire	Fitzwilliam	2,723 acres (1,102 ha)	1947	
Rollins State Park	Merrimack	Warner	118.5 acres (48.0 ha)	1950	
Rye Harbor State Park	Rockingham	Rye	63 acres (25 ha)	1936	
Sculptured Rocks Natural Area	Grafton	Groton	272 acres (110 ha)		
Silver Lake State Park	Hillsborough	Hollis	80 acres (32 ha)	1954	
Umbagog Lake State Park	Coös	Errol	136.0 acres (55.0 ha)	1998	
Wadleigh State Park	Merrimack	Sutton	43 acres (17 ha)	1934	
Wallis Sands State Beach	Rockingham	Rye	30 acres (12 ha)	1964	
Weeks State Park	Coös	Lancaster	420 acres (170 ha)	1941	
Wellington State Park	Grafton	Alexandria	204 acres (83 ha)	1931	
Wentworth State Park	Carroll	Wolfeboro	50 acres (20 ha)	1934	
White Lake State Park	Carroll	Tamworth	902.7 acres (365.3 ha)	1933	
Winslow State Park	Merrimack	Wilmot		1935	

== State historic sites ==
Name	County	Town	Size	Estab- lished	Image
Bedell Bridge State Historic Site	Grafton	Haverhill	38 acres (15 ha)		
Daniel Webster Birthplace State Historic Site	Merrimack	Franklin	147 acres (59 ha)		
Endicott Rock State Historic Site	Belknap	Laconia	0.1 acres (0.040 ha)		
Fort Constitution State Historic Site	Rockingham	New Castle	2 acres (0.81 ha)		
Fort Stark State Historic Site	Rockingham	New Castle	10 acres (4.0 ha)		
Franklin Pierce Homestead State Historic Site	Hillsborough	Hillsborough	13 acres (5.3 ha)		
Governor Wentworth Historic Site	Carroll	Wolfeboro	96 acres (39 ha)		
Hannah Duston Memorial State Historic Site	Merrimack	Boscawen			
John Wingate Weeks Historic Site	Coös	Lancaster	420 acres (170 ha)	1941	
Nansen Ski Jump State Historic Site	Coös	Milan	14 acres (5.7 ha)		
Robert Frost Farm State Historic Site	Rockingham	Derry			
Taylor Mill State Historic Site	Rockingham	Derry			
Tip-Top House	Coös	Sargent's Purchase			
Wentworth–Coolidge Mansion State Historic Site	Rockingham	Portsmouth			
White Island State Historic Site	Rockingham	Rye	5 acres (2.0 ha)		
Willey House	Carroll	Hart's Location			

== Other state protected areas ==
Other areas of note still owned by the state but not maintained.

Name	County	Town	Size	Estab- lished	Image
Bear's Den Natural Area	Cheshire	Gilsum	95 acres (38 ha)		
Binney Pond Natural Area	Hillsborough	New Ipswich	99 acres (40 ha)		
Bradford Pines Natural Area	Merrimack	Bradford	5 acres (2.0 ha)		
Crosby Mountain State Park	Grafton	Groton	86 acres (35 ha)	Donated in 1971	
Curtiss Dogwood Natural Area	Hillsborough	Wilton	14 acres (5.7 ha)		
Dublin Lake Scenic Area	Cheshire	Dublin	1.3 acres (0.53 ha)		
Heath Pond Bog Natural Area	Carroll	Ossipee	1,378.5 acres (557.9 ha)		
Humphrey's Ledge Natural Area	Carroll	Bartlett	36 acres (15 ha)		
Jeremy Mill Natural Area	Hillsborough	Pelham	63 acres (25 ha)		
Mascot Mine Natural Area	Coös	Gorham	11.7 acres (4.7 ha)		
Ossipee Lake Natural Area	Carroll	Ossipee	400 acres (160 ha)		
Otter Brook Lake	Cheshire	Keene	2.5 acres (1.0 ha)		
Smith's Ferry Heritage Park	Hillsborough	Manchester	17 acres (6.9 ha)		
Urban Forestry Center	Rockingham	Portsmouth	182 acres (74 ha)		
Wantastiquet Mountain Natural Area or Wantastiquet State Forest	Cheshire	West Chesterfield	1,006 acres (407 ha)		

== See also ==
- List of U.S. national parks
- List of New Hampshire state forests
