= Umbagog Lake State Park =

Park in Errol, New Hampshire, US

- Lake_Umbagog

- Location within New Hampshire
- Interactive map of Umbagog Lake State Park
- Location: Errol, New Hampshire, United States
- Coordinates: 44°42′08″N 71°03′20″W
- Area: 1,360 acres (550 ha)
- Elevation: 1,243 feet (379 m)
- Established: 1998
- Administrator: New Hampshire Division of Parks and Recreation
- Website: Official website
- New Hampshire State Parks

Umbagog Lake State Park is a 1,360-acre (550 ha) park in Errol, New Hampshire, on the southern shore of Umbagog Lake along Route 26. It is adjacent to the Umbagog National Wildlife Refuge. Activities in the state park include swimming, camping, canoeing, fishing, hiking, wildlife watching, and picnicking. There is a public campground and a public boat launch ramp which may be accessed from New Hampshire Route 26. There are 33 wilderness campsites, accessible only by boat, which are located around the lake. The park includes a visitor center and a marina with canoe, kayak, and rowboat rentals, and a beach area.

== Astronomy ==
Umbagog Lake State Park is the only state park east of Michigan that is classified as Bortle 1 for night skies, which means that it is a state park that has pristine astronomical viewing. The park is one of ten New Hampshire state parks that are in the path of totality for the 2024 solar eclipse, with 1 minute and 33 seconds of totality.
