= Androscoggin Wayside Park =

Park in Errol, New Hampshire, U.S.

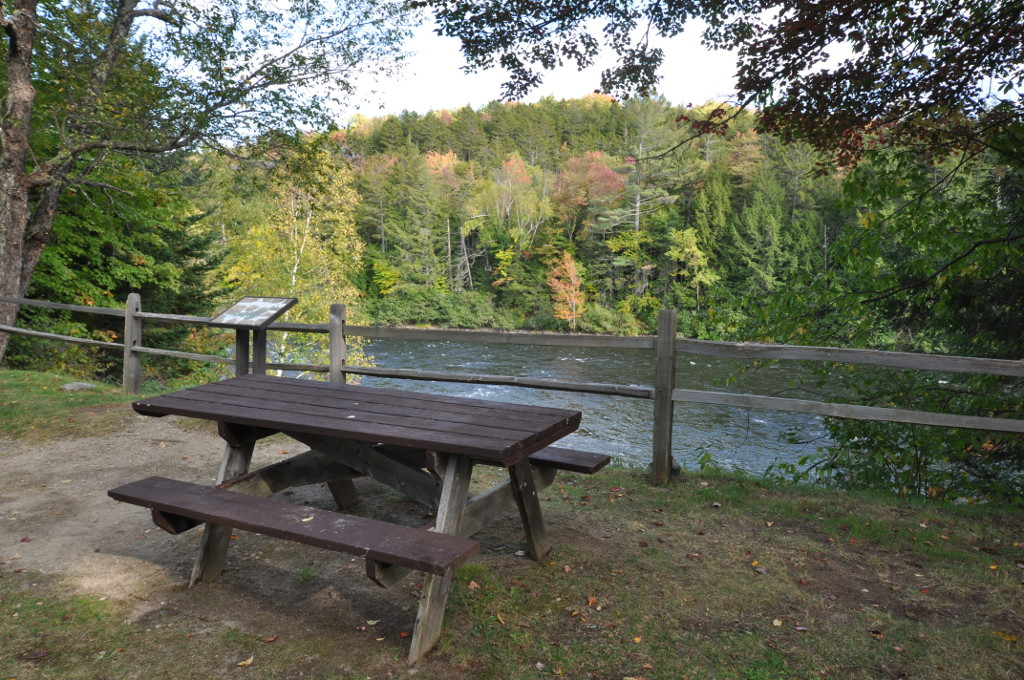
- Overlook on Androscoggin River

- Location within New Hampshire
- Interactive map of Androscoggin Wayside Park
- Location: 1607 Berlin Road, Errol, New Hampshire, United States
- Coordinates: 44°44′30″N 71°10′48″W
- Elevation: 1,224 feet (373 m)
- Established: 1958
- Administrator: New Hampshire Division of Parks and Recreation
- Website: Official website
- New Hampshire State Parks

Androscoggin Wayside Park is located on the Androscoggin River in Errol, New Hampshire, along Route 16. Located in the Thirteen Mile Woods scenic area of northern New Hampshire, the small park is free to use, open year-round, and offers a picnic area, canoeing, and fishing. It is part of Mollidgewock State Park.
