= Mount Washington State Park =

State park in Coös County, New Hampshire

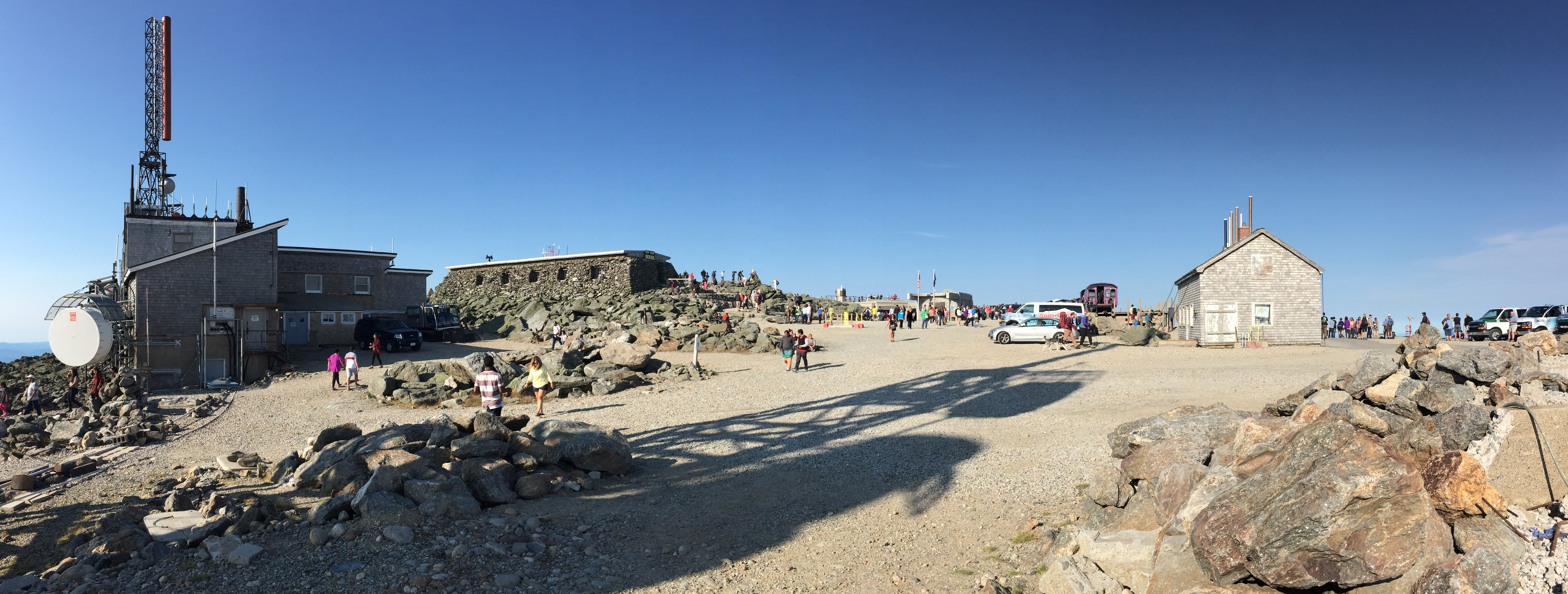
- Summit panorama looking north

- Location within New Hampshire
- Interactive map of Mount Washington State Park
- Location: Mount Washington, New Hampshire
- Coordinates: 44°16′10″N 71°18′06″W
- Area: 60.3 acres (24.4 ha)
- Established: 1964
- Administrator: New Hampshire Division of Parks and Recreation
- Website: Official website
- New Hampshire State Parks

Mount Washington State Park is a 60.3-acre (24.4 ha) parcel perched on the summit of Mount Washington, New Hampshire, the highest peak in the northeastern United States. Summer seasonal amenities include a cafeteria, restrooms, gift shops, the Mount Washington Observatory and its museum. The historic Tip Top House is located adjacent to the summit building and is open (small fee) to visitors from early May to early October. The park is accessible by the Mount Washington Auto Road, the Mount Washington Cog Railway, the Appalachian Trail, or numerous other hiking trails from surrounding trailheads including Pinkham Notch, Crawford Notch and the Cog Railway base station.

The land forming the park was originally given to Dartmouth College in 1951 by the estate of the owner of the Cog Railway. Dartmouth sold 59 acres (240,000 m^{2}) to the State of New Hampshire in 1964 for use as a park and then sold the final 8 acres (32,000 m^{2}) in 2008 for $2.1M, after a long-term broadcasting lease had expired. A small segment of the summit is still owned by the Cog Railway and used as the upper terminus of the railway.

== History ==
In 1642, Darby Field was the first to climb to the summit of Mount Washington. He supposedly had guidance by local Native Americans.

Construction of the auto road started in 1854. After funds ran out in 1856, the current Mount Washington Summit Road Company completed building it in 1859. It was at that time that summit buildings were erected. The Cog Railway completed construction in 1869. In 1908 a major fire destroyed all of the buildings but one — the Tip Top House.
