= Milan Hill State Park =

State park in Coös County, New Hampshire

- Fire tower at the summit of Milan Hill
- Interactive map of Milan Hill State Park
- Location: Milan, New Hampshire, United States
- Coordinates: 44°34′20″N 71°13′23″W
- Area: 102 acres (41 ha)
- Elevation: 1,729 feet (527 m)
- Established: 1939
- Administrator: New Hampshire Division of Parks and Recreation
- Website: Official website
New Hampshire State Parks
Milan Hill State Park
- Location within New Hampshire

Milan Hill State Park is a 102-acre (41 ha) public recreation area located on New Hampshire Route 110B in the town of Milan, New Hampshire. The state park features a 1932 fire tower and camping.

== History ==
The park began as a Civilian Conservation Corps camp in the 1930s. The original name of Milan Hill was Barrows Mountain, first settled around 1822 by John Ellingwood and his wife Rachel Barrows. Their son Isaac was the first white child born on Milan Hill.
