= Greenfield State Park =

State park in New Hampshire, United States

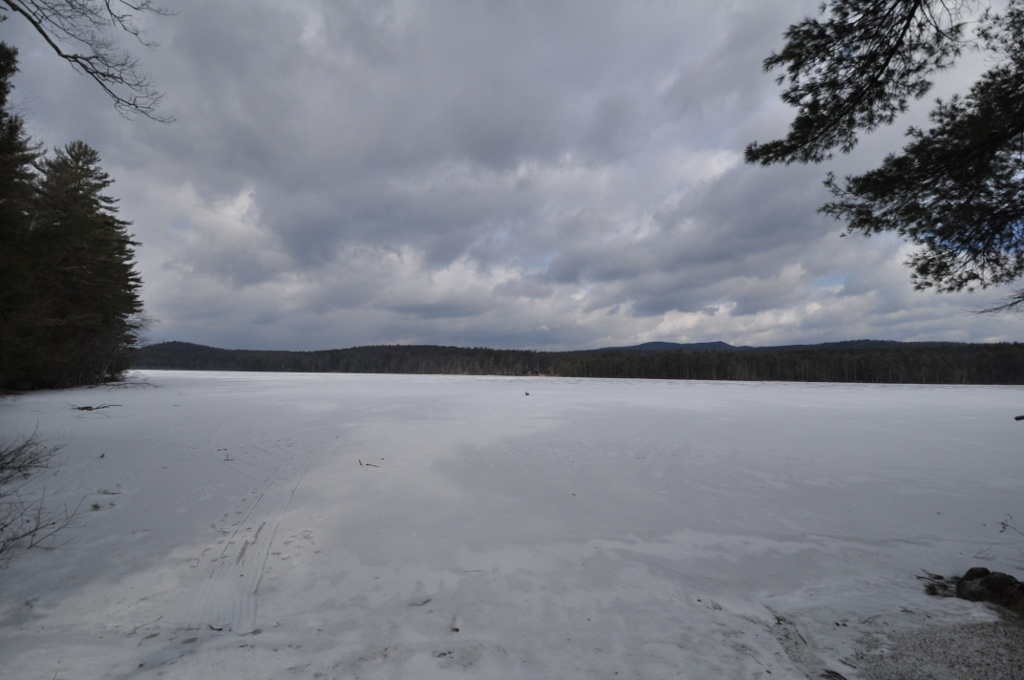
- Otter Lake in winter

- Location within New Hampshire
- Interactive map of Greenfield State Park
- Location: Greenfield, New Hampshire, United States
- Coordinates: 42°57′30″N 71°53′13″W
- Area: 400 acres (160 ha)
- Elevation: 883 feet (269 m)
- Established: 1959
- Administrator: New Hampshire Division of Parks and Recreation
- Website: Official website
- New Hampshire State Parks

Greenfield State Park is a 400-acre (160 ha) public recreation area in Greenfield, New Hampshire. The state park features ponds, bogs, and a forest that extends to the shore of undeveloped Otter Lake. Activities include camping, hiking, swimming, fishing, picnicking, and non-motorized boating. There is a small store, playground, boat ramp, and rentals.
