= Clough State Park =

State park in Hillsborough County, New Hampshire

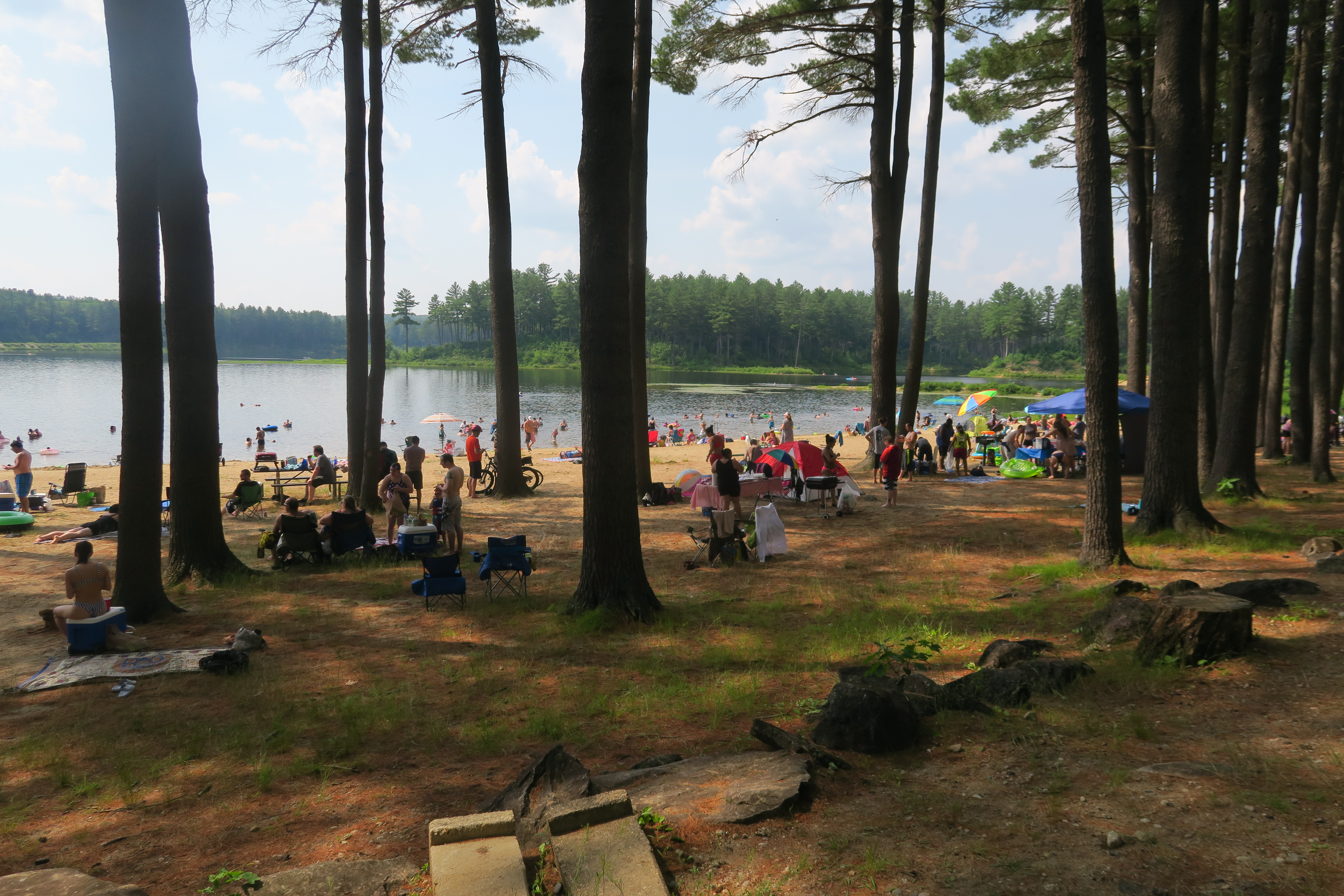

- Location within New Hampshire
- Interactive map of Clough State Park
- Location: Weare, New Hampshire, United States
- Coordinates: 43°05′48″N 71°39′25″W
- Area: 150 acres (61 ha)
- Elevation: 440 feet (130 m)
- Established: 1964
- Administrator: New Hampshire Division of Parks and Recreation
- Website: Official website
- New Hampshire State Parks

Clough State Park is a public recreation area on the east side of Everett Lake, a 150-acre (60 ha) reservoir formed by a dam on the Piscataquog River, in Weare, New Hampshire. The state park has a 900-foot (270 m) sandy beach, playing fields, and picnic area and offers opportunities for swimming, hiking, fishing, picnicking, and non-motorized boating.
