= Wallis Sands State Beach =

Park in Rye, New Hampshire, United States

Wallis Sands State Park
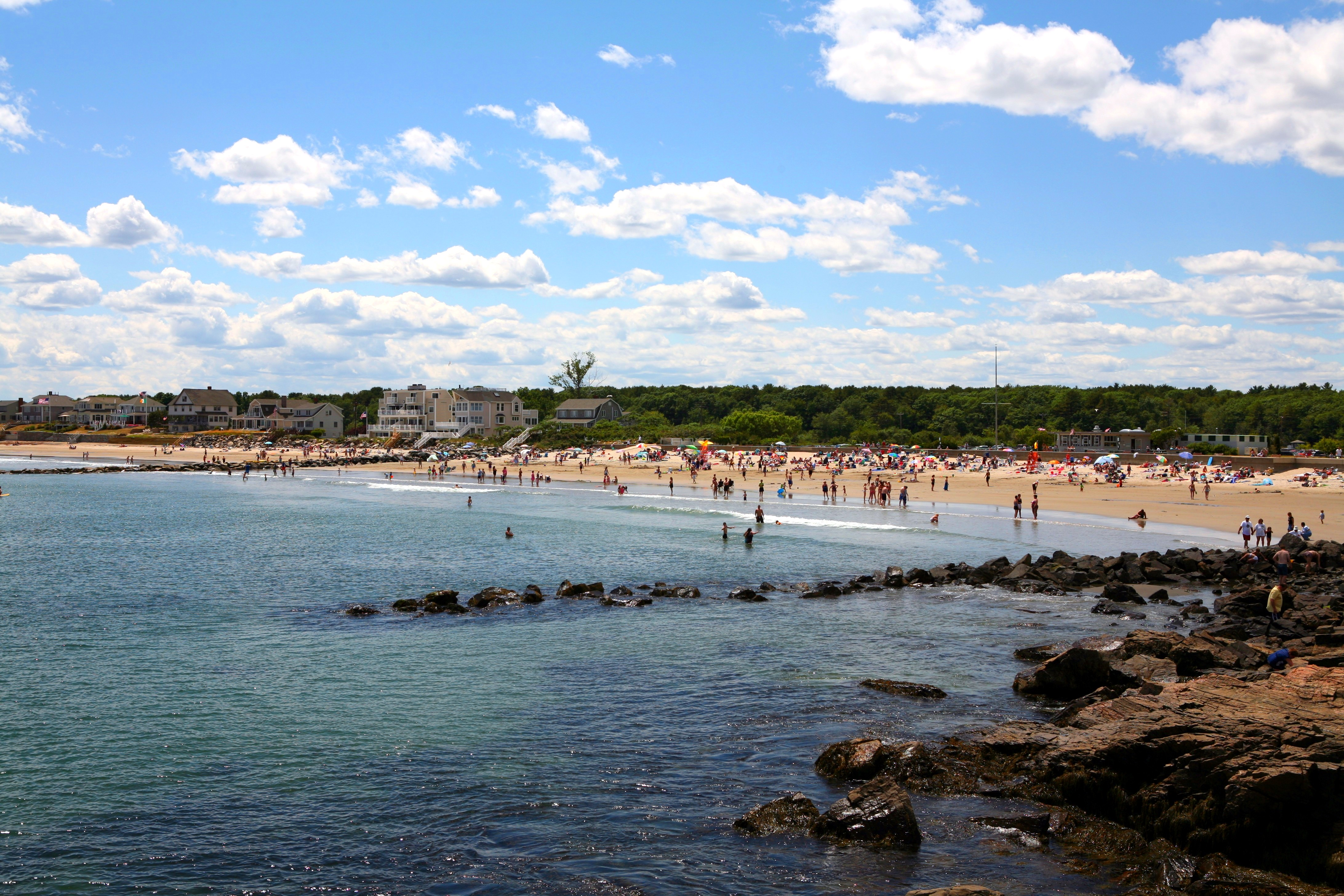

- Location within New Hampshire
- Interactive map of Wallis Sands State Park
- Location: Rye, New Hampshire, United States
- Coordinates: 43°01′40″N 70°43′44″W
- Area: 30 acres (12 ha)
- Elevation: 0 feet (0 m)
- Established: 1964
- Administrator: New Hampshire Division of Parks and Recreation
- Website: Official website
- New Hampshire State Parks

Wallis Sands State Park (also called Wallis Sands State Beach) is a public recreation area located on the Atlantic Ocean in the town of Rye, New Hampshire. The state park offers a sandy beach with bathhouse, picnicking, and 500-car pay-parking lot.

== History ==
Coastal station

During the 19th century and early 20th century, Wallis Sands was a Life-Saving Station of the United States Life-Saving Service and subsequently was a station of the United States Coast Guard. The station was discontinued around 1938.

State park

The first parcel of the future state park, about one acre in size, was purchased by the state in 1901. That fragment was used as a wayside park in the 1950s. Following expansion of its footprint to 18 acres (7.3 ha) and the construction of jetties to protect an enlarged beach area, Wallis Sands State Park was opened to the public in June 1964.

Jellyfish incident

In July 2010, nearly 150 beachgoers and swimmers were stung here on the same day by a lion's mane jellyfish. Most were treated on site with vinegar, and several children were taken to a hospital. A lifeguard had pitchforked a 40-pound (18 kg) jellyfish – whose longest tentacle was 13 feet (4.0 m) – to try to drag it ashore and dispose of it; however, the dead jellyfish broke apart, releasing its nematocysts on the beach and stinging the crowd in the span of about 20 minutes.
