= Monadnock State Park =

State park in Cheshire County, New Hampshire

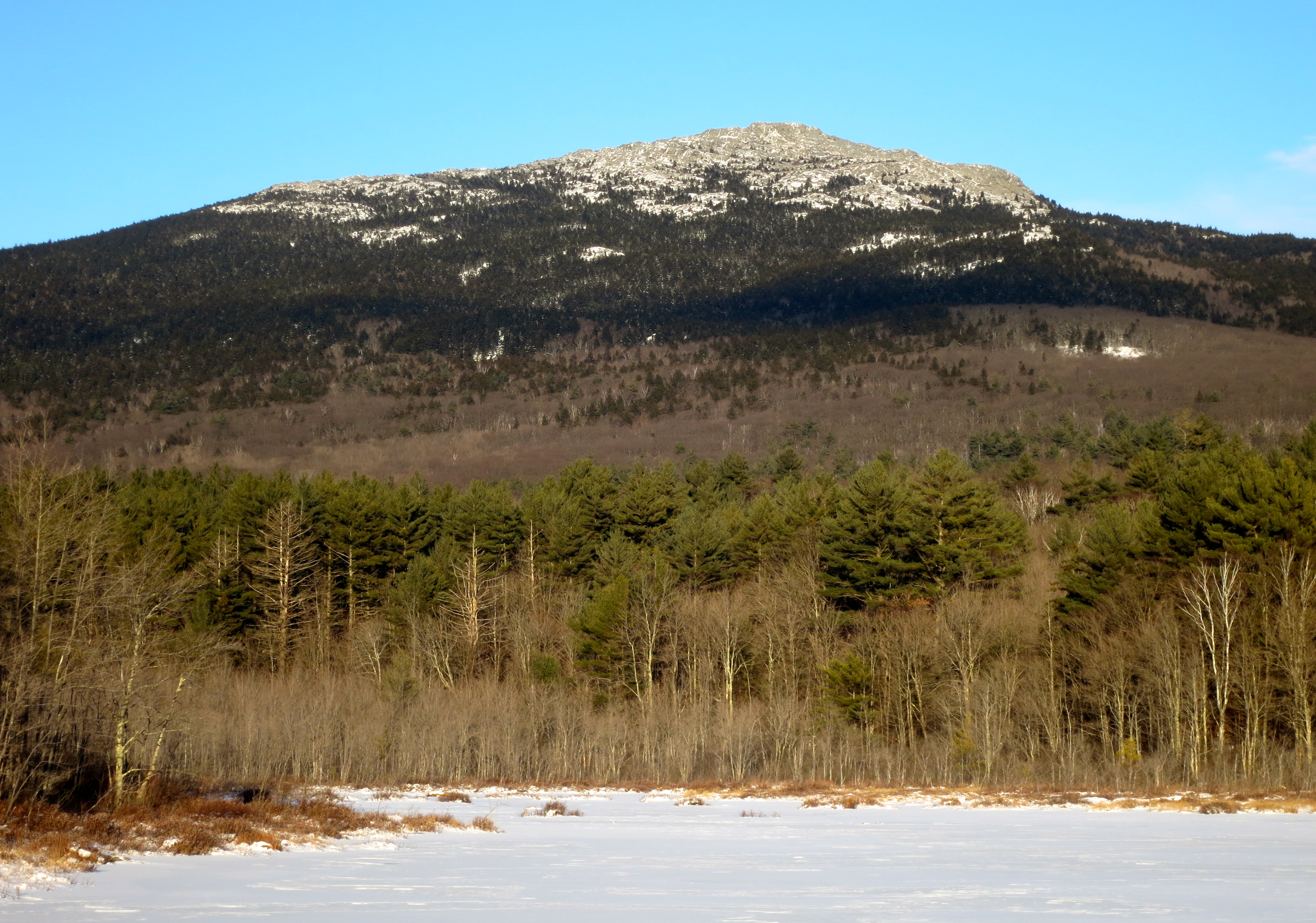
- Mount Monadnock as seen from NH 124
- Interactive map of Monadnock State Park
- Location: Jaffrey, New Hampshire, United States
- Coordinates: 42°51′45″N 72°04′03″W
- Area: 1,017 acres (412 ha)
- Elevation: 1,224 feet (373 m)
- Established: 1905
- Administrator: New Hampshire Division of Parks and Recreation
- Website: Official website
New Hampshire State Parks
Monadnock State Park
- Location within New Hampshire

Monadnock State Park in Jaffrey, New Hampshire, United States, is a 1,017-acre (4.12 km^{2}) state park located on and around 3,165-foot (965 m) Mount Monadnock. The park is surrounded by thousands of acres of protected highlands.

The park is open to hiking, picnicking, camping, backpacking, snowshoeing and cross country skiing. Backcountry skiing is possible on some of the lower trails. There are two campgrounds.

A per-person fee is charged (in season) to park at the Old Toll Road and State Park Headquarters trailheads. There are no roads to the summit, and the Old Toll Road, which leads to the Halfway House site, is closed to vehicles.

In 1987, Mount Monadnock was designated a National Natural Landmark.
