= Forest Lake State Park =

State park in Coös County, New Hampshire

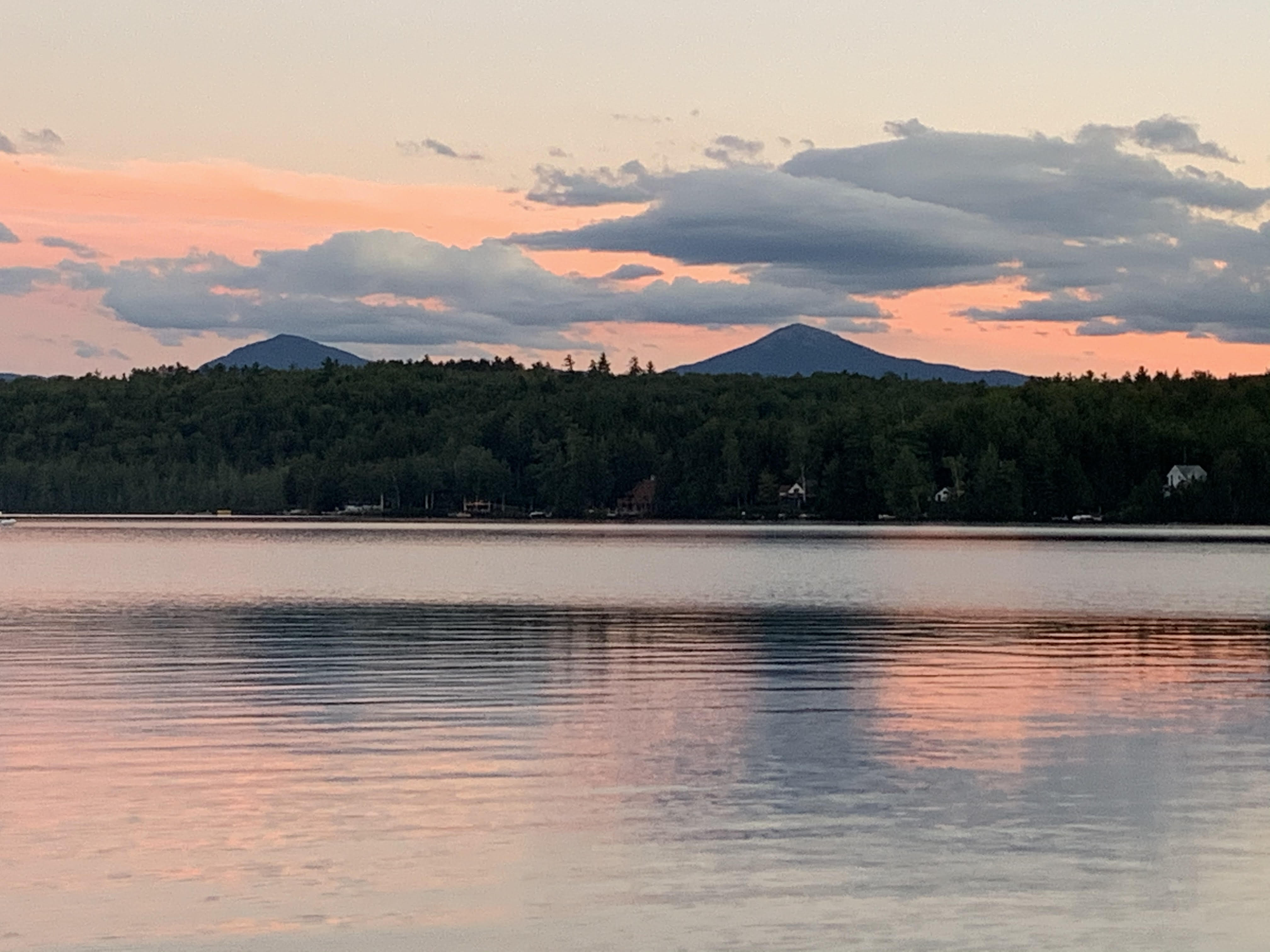
- Mounts Garfield and Lafayette are visible from the lakeshore.

- Location within New Hampshire
- Interactive map of Forest Lake State Park
- Location: Dalton, New Hampshire, United States
- Coordinates: 44°21′12″N 71°40′33″W
- Area: 397 acres (161 ha)
- Elevation: 1,106 feet (337 m)
- Established: 1935
- Administrator: New Hampshire Division of Parks and Recreation
- Website: Official website
- New Hampshire State Parks

Forest Lake State Park is a 397-acre (161 ha) state park in Dalton, New Hampshire. The park is free to use, open year-round, and offers a 200-foot sandy beach on the shore of Forest Lake. Activities in the park include swimming, picnicking, mountain biking, fishing, and boating.
