= Hannah Duston Memorial State Historic Site =

Statue in Boscawen, New Hampshire

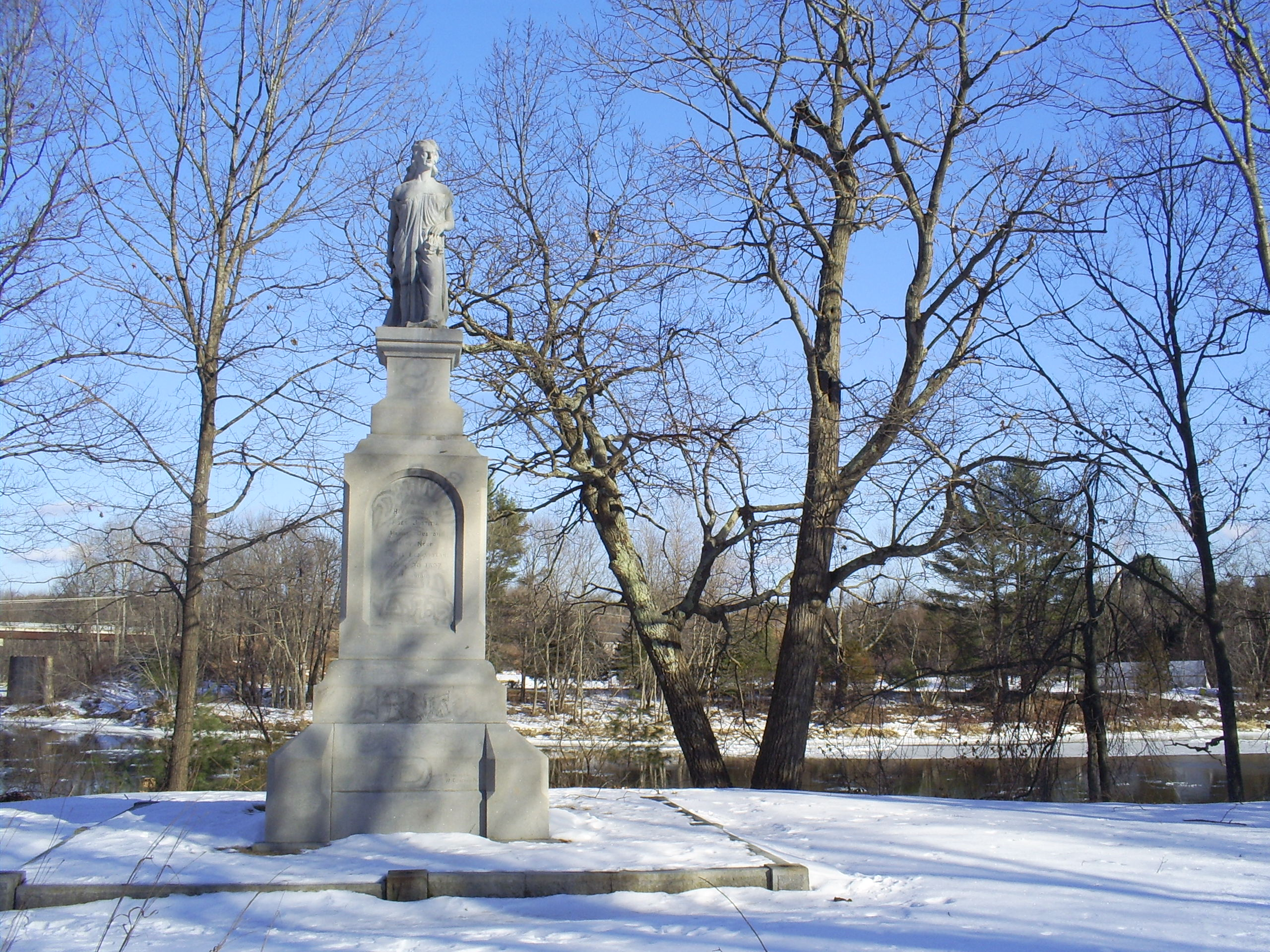

- Location within New Hampshire
- Location: 298 US Route 4 Boscawen, New Hampshire
- Coordinates: 43°17′17″N 71°35′27″W
- Area: 0.4 acres (0.16 ha)
- Administrator: New Hampshire Division of Parks and Recreation
- Designation: New Hampshire state park
- Website: Hannah Duston Memorial State Historic Site

Hannah Duston Memorial State Historic Site is a 35-foot (11 m) statue in Boscawen, New Hampshire, located on a small island at the confluence of the Contoocook and Merrimack rivers. Erected in 1874 and the first publicly funded statue in New Hampshire, the memorial commemorates Hannah Duston, who was captured in 1697 in Haverhill, Massachusetts, during King William's War, then killed her captors while they were camped at the site in Boscawen.

In 2025, New Hampshire state legislator, David Nagel, called for the removal of the statute of Hannah Duston on the basis that it glorified violence against Native Americans. The bill was criticized by citizens and family members.
