= Ahern State Park =

State park in New Hampshire, U.S.

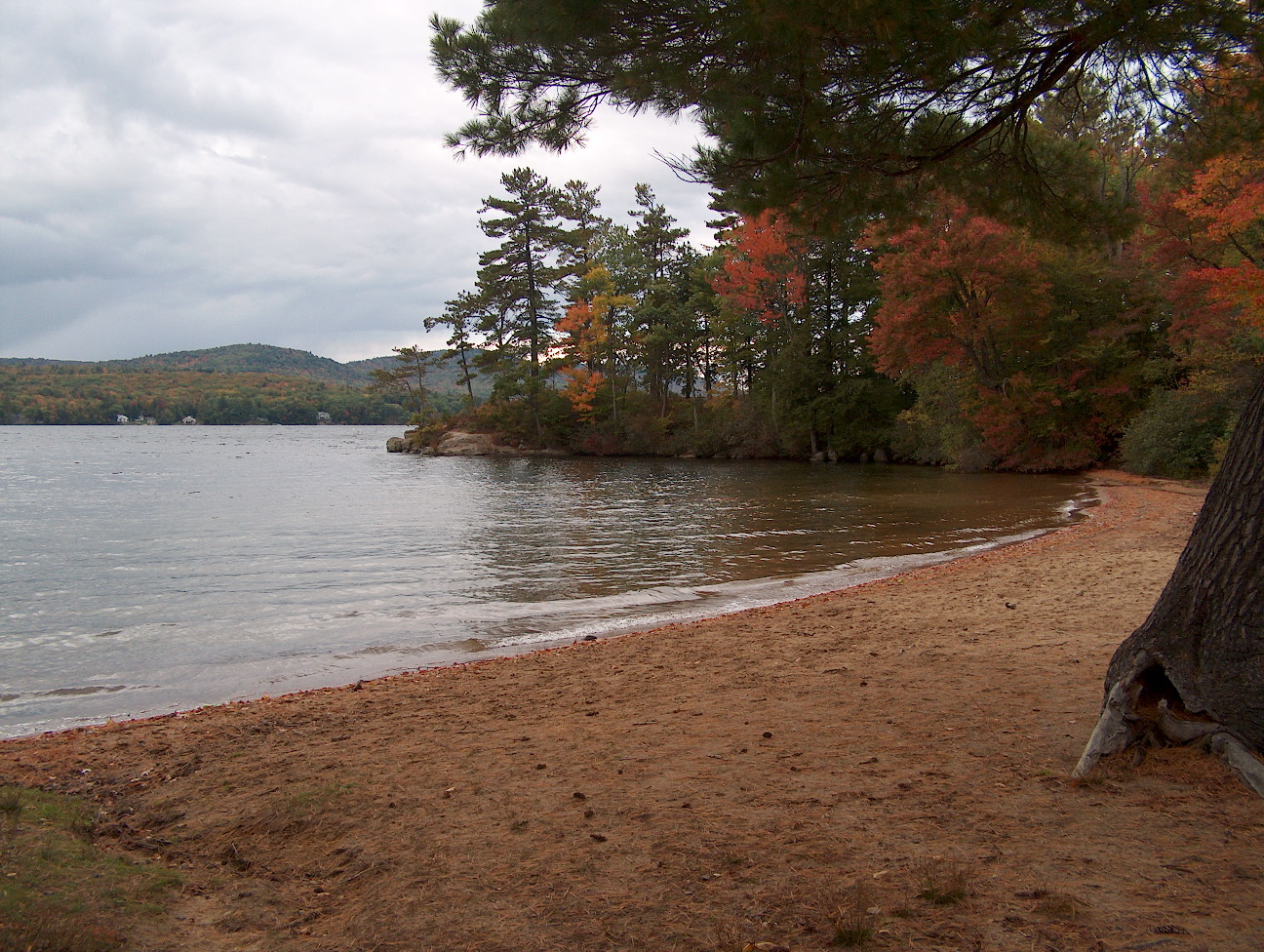
- Lake Winnisquam shore, looking toward Winni Point

- Location within New Hampshire
- Interactive map of Ahern State Park
- Location: Laconia, New Hampshire, United States
- Coordinates: 43°33′20″N 71°29′50″W
- Area: 128 acres (52 ha)
- Established: 1994
- Administrator: New Hampshire Division of Parks and Recreation
- Website: Official website
- New Hampshire State Parks

Ahern State Park is a 128-acre (52 ha) state protected area in Laconia on Lake Winnisquam in New Hampshire's Lakes Region. It is open year-round and offers hiking, non-motorized boating, biking, and fishing. It features 3,500 feet (1,100 m) of lake shoreline.

== History ==
The property was part of Laconia State School, originally known as the New Hampshire School for Feebleminded Children, which opened in 1903 and closed in 1991. The state reserved 128 acres (52 ha) as Governor's State Park in 1994 and renamed it Ahern State Park in 1998.
