= Governor Wentworth Historic Site =

Protected area in Wolfeboro, New Hampshire

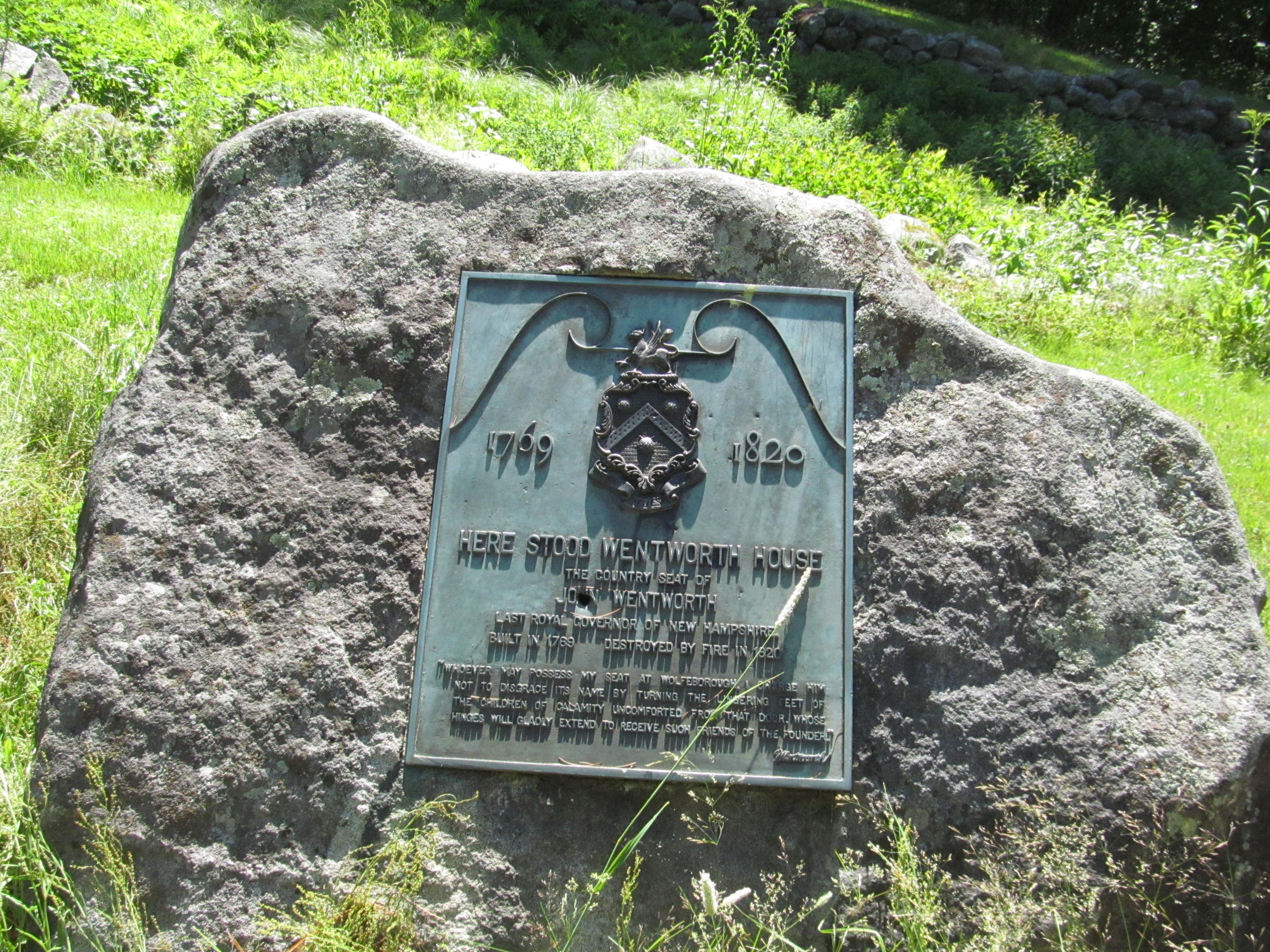

- Location within New Hampshire
- Interactive map of Governor Wentworth Historic Site
- Location: Wolfeboro, New Hampshire, United States
- Coordinates: 43°36′02″N 71°07′25″W
- Area: 96 acres (39 ha)
- Elevation: 653 feet (199 m)
- Established: 1934
- Administrator: New Hampshire Division of Parks and Recreation
- Designation: New Hampshire State Park; New Hampshire State Register of Historic Places (July 30, 2007)
- Website: Official website
- New Hampshire State Parks

Governor Wentworth Historic Site is a 96-acre (0.39 km^{2}) protected area in Wolfeboro, New Hampshire. The undeveloped property features a plaque and the stone remains of an extensive northern country estate built just before the outbreak of the American Revolution by New Hampshire's second Royal Governor, John Wentworth. The mansion burned to the ground in 1820. The site was acquired by the state in 1934, and was added to the New Hampshire State Register of Historic Places in 2007.
