= Magalloway, Maine =

- Township
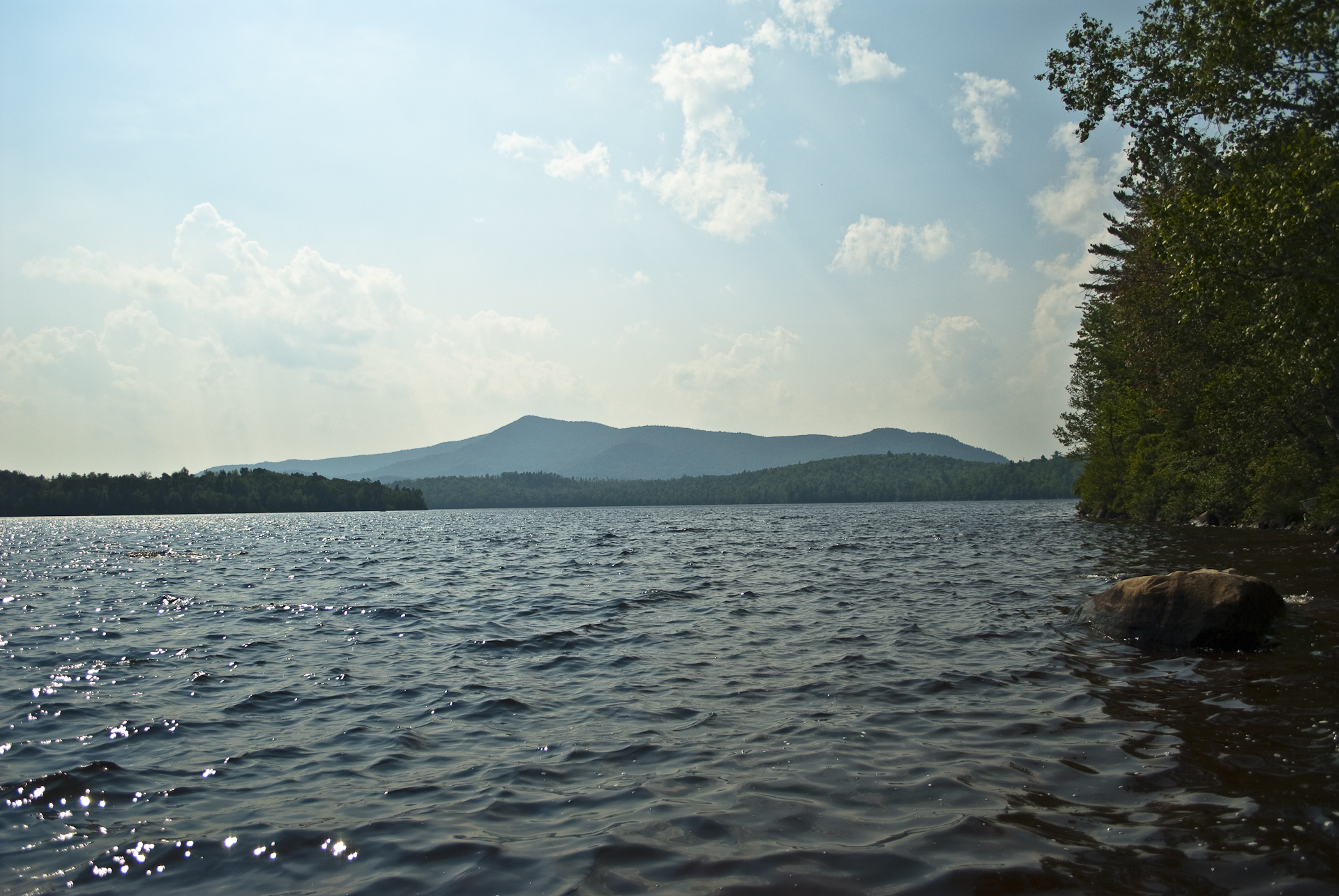
- Sturtevant Pond in Magalloway

- Location within Maine Location within the United States
- Coordinates: 44°51′42″N 70°58′10″W
- Country: United States
- State: Maine
- County: Oxford

Area
  - Total: 54.2 sq mi (140.3 km^{2})
  - Land: 48.4 sq mi (125.3 km^{2})
  - Water: 5.8 sq mi (15.0 km^{2})
- Elevation: 1,407 ft (429 m)

Population (2020)
  - Total: 45
  - Density: 0.93/sq mi (0.36/km^{2})
- Time zone: UTC-5 (Eastern (EST))
  - Summer (DST): UTC-4 (EDT)
- ZIP code: 03579
- Area code: 207
- FIPS code: 23-42835
- GNIS feature ID: 0579017

Magalloway is a township in Oxford County, Maine, United States. It has been part of North Oxford unorganized territory since it de-organized as a plantation in 2021. The population was 45 at the 2020 census. Part of the Umbagog National Wildlife Refuge is located at its southwestern corner.

== Geography ==
According to the United States Census Bureau, the township has a total area of 54.2 square miles (140 km^{2}), of which 48.4 square miles (125 km^{2}) is land and 5.8 square miles (15 km^{2}) (10.67%) is water. The township is located along the New Hampshire border, in Maine's western mountain region. Various bodies of water are located in the township, including Sturtevant Pond, a segment of the Magalloway River, and a portion of Umbagog Lake.

== Demographics ==
Historical population
Census	Pop.	Note	%±
1880	45		—
1890	79		75.6%
1900	77		−2.5%
1910	97		26.0%
1920	86		−11.3%
1930	83		−3.5%
1940	84		1.2%
1950	83		−1.2%
1960	50		−39.8%
1970	75		50.0%
1980	79		5.3%
1990	45		−43.0%
2000	37		−17.8%
2010	46		24.3%
2020	45		−2.2%
U.S. Decennial Census

As of the census of 2000, there were 37 people, 15 households, and 12 families residing in the plantation. The population density was 0.8 inhabitants per square mile (0.31/km^{2}). There were 105 housing units at an average density of 2.2 per square mile (0.85/km^{2}). The racial makeup of the plantation was 100.00% White.

There were 15 households, out of which 26.7% had children under the age of 18 living with them, 80.0% were married couples living together, and 20.0% were non-families. 20.0% of all households were made up of individuals, and 6.7% had someone living alone who was 65 years of age or older. The average household size was 2.47 and the average family size was 2.83.

In the plantation the population was spread out, with 18.9% under the age of 18, 5.4% from 18 to 24, 5.4% from 25 to 44, 40.5% from 45 to 64, and 29.7% who were 65 years of age or older. The median age was 52 years. For every 100 females, there were 117.6 males. For every 100 females age 18 and over, there were 100.0 males.

The median income for a household in the plantation was $33,750, and the median income for a family was $39,167. Males had a median income of $0 versus $25,833 for females. The per capita income for the plantation was $16,546. None of the population and none of the families lived below the poverty line.
