= Beaver Brook Falls Wayside =

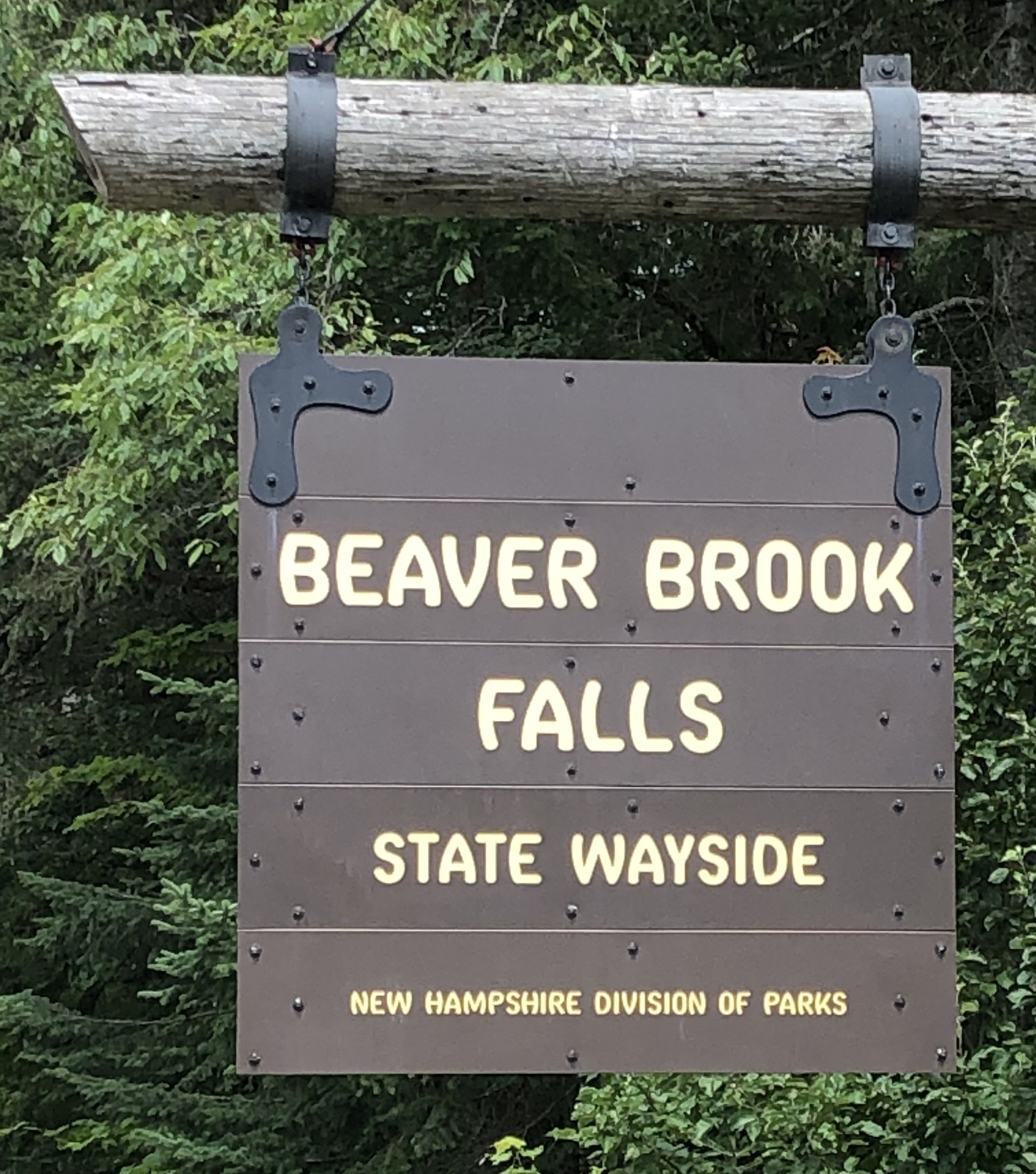

- Location within New Hampshire
- Interactive map of Beaver Brook Falls Wayside
- Location: 432 Route 145, Colebrook, New Hampshire, United States
- Coordinates: 44°55′12″N 71°27′53″W
- Area: 7.3 acres (3.0 ha)
- Elevation: 1,142 ft (348 m)
- Established: 1967
- Administrator: New Hampshire Division of Parks and Recreation
- Website: Official website
- New Hampshire State Parks

Beaver Brook Falls Wayside is a 7.3-acre (3.0 ha) park in Colebrook, New Hampshire, along Route 145. It features a roadside view of the scenic 80-foot (24 m) Beaver Brook Falls. Picnic tables, restroom facilities and a small picnic shelter are available.

== History ==
Beaver Brook Falls Wayside was created from Keazer Memorial Park which was given to the State by the heirs of Joseph Y. Keazer in 1961. It became a state park on July 19, 1967.

== Photos ==
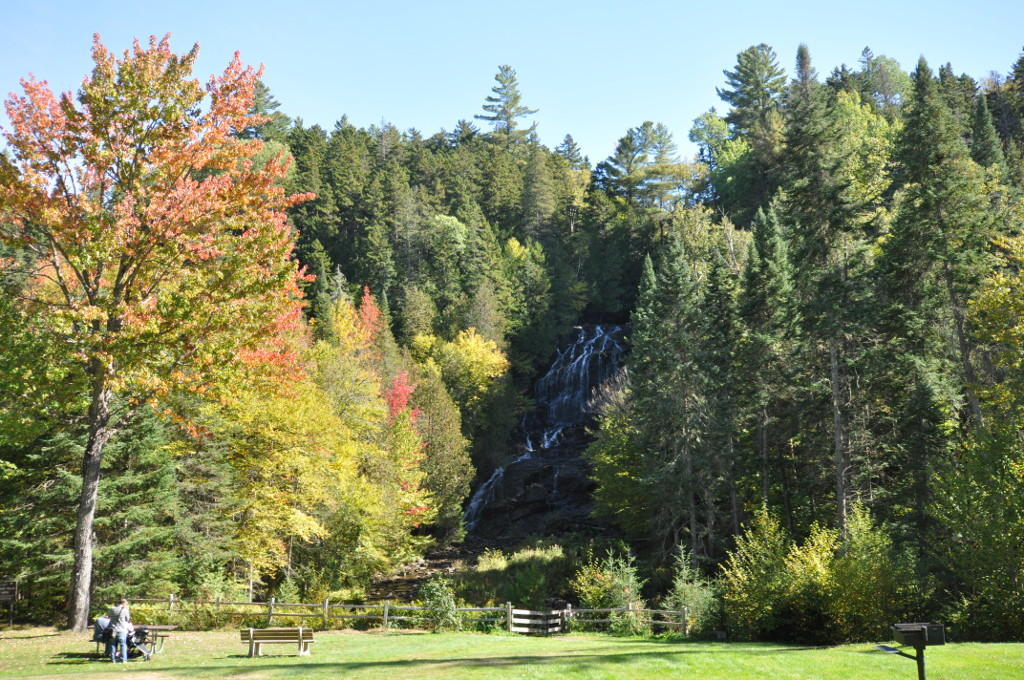
Wayside park in autumn 2016

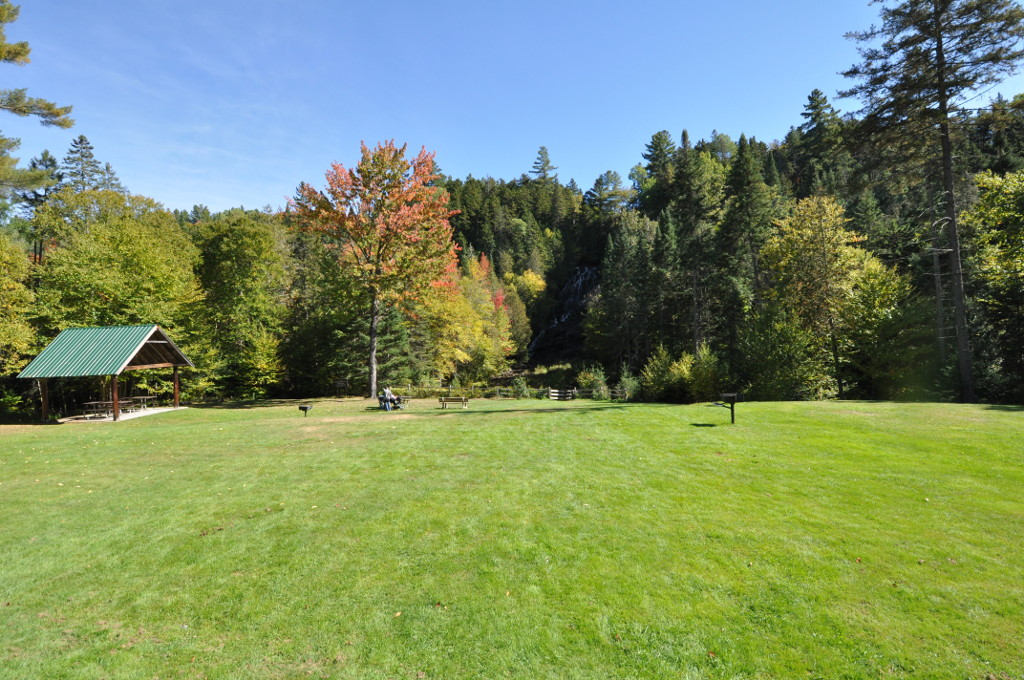
Open area with picnic tables and rain shelter, autumn 2016
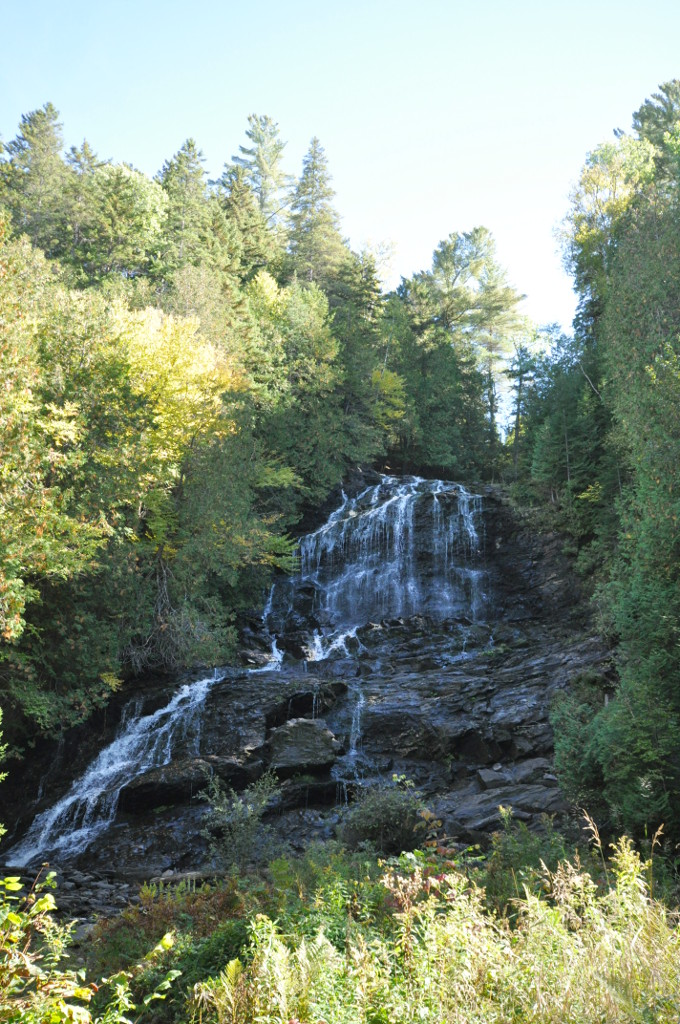
The falls in autumn 2016

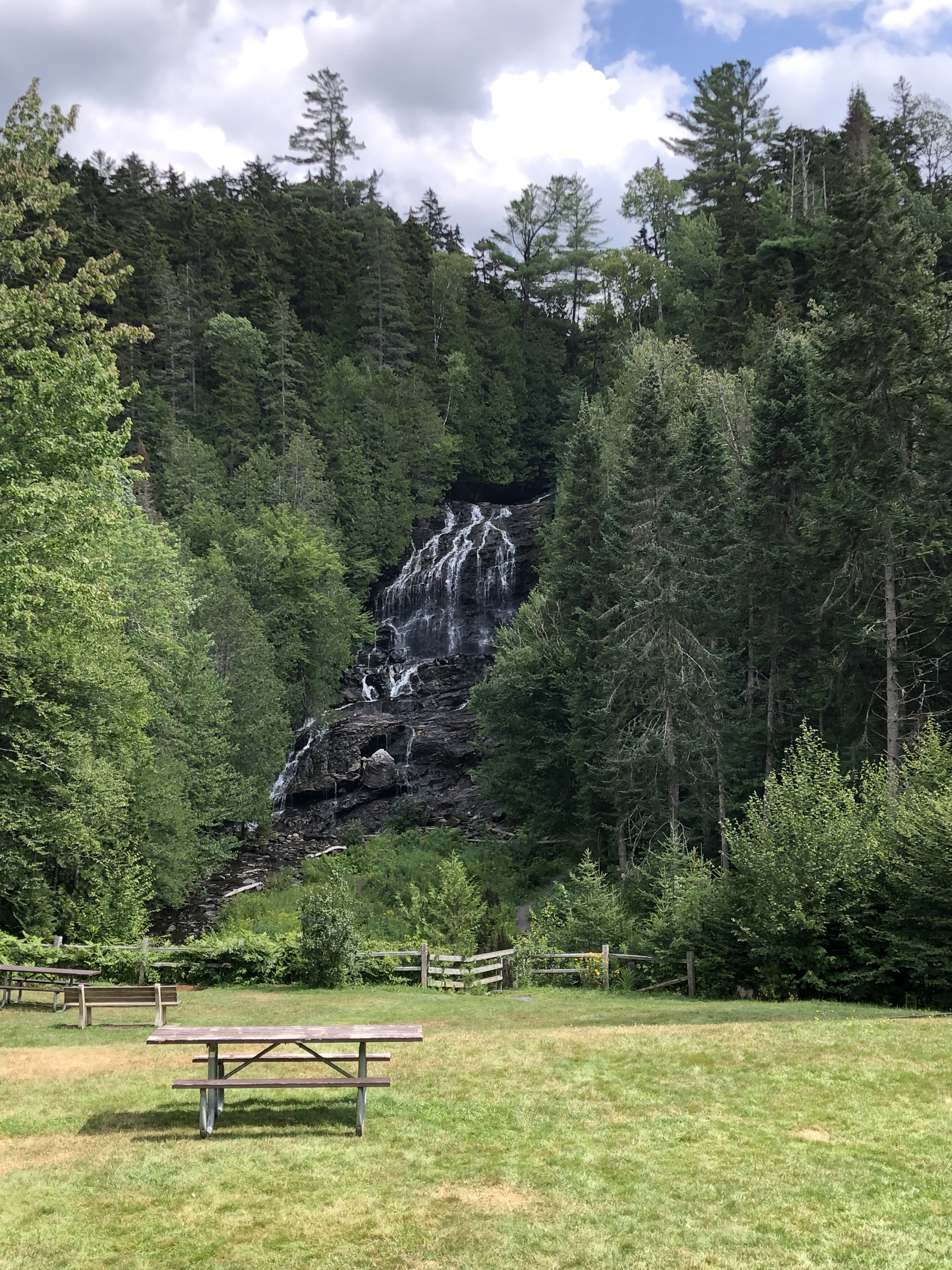
The falls in August 2019
