= Eisenhower Memorial Wayside Park =

Park in New Hampshire, United States

Eisenhower Memorial Wayside
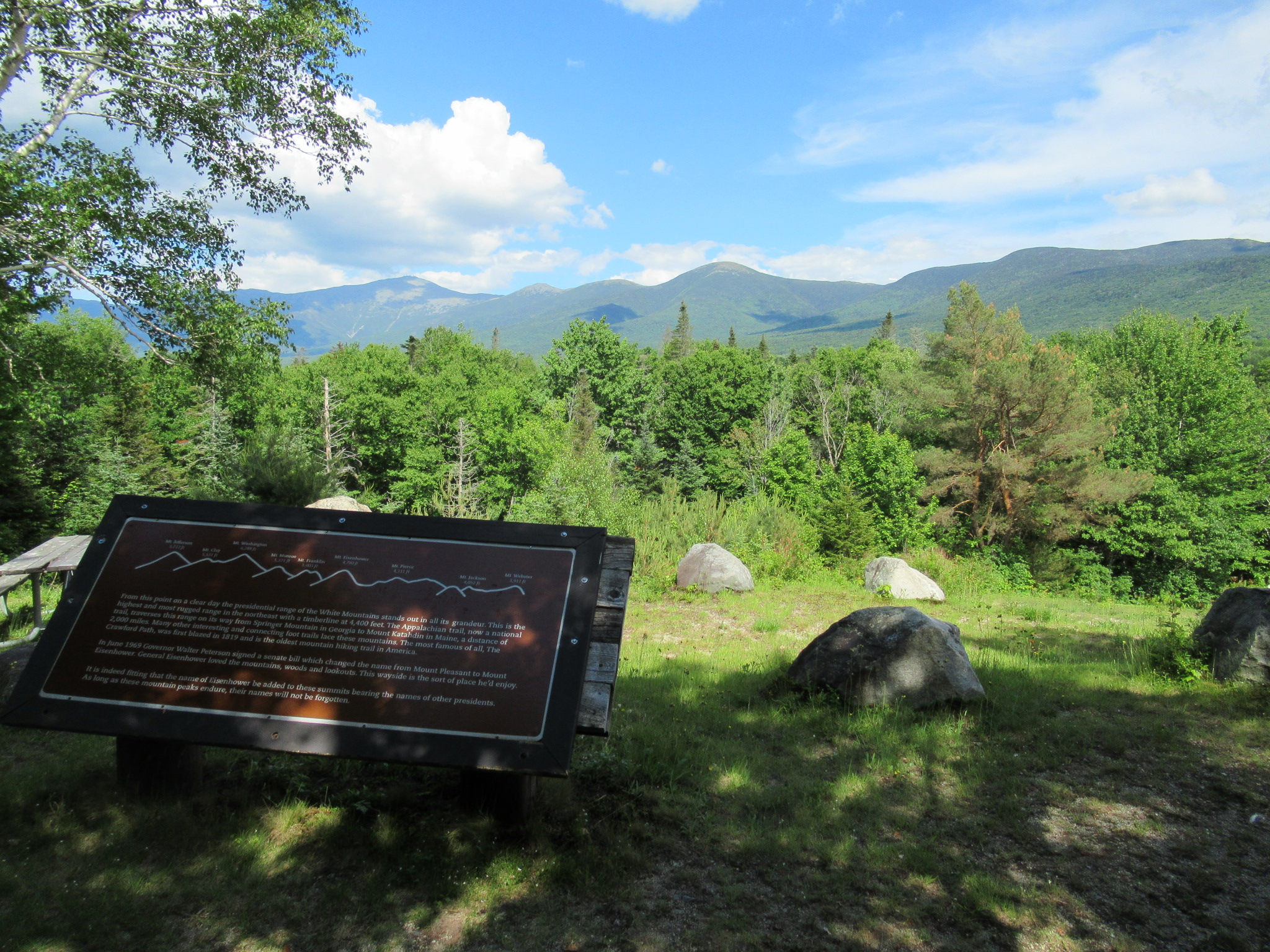
- View of the southern part of the Presidential Range from the park. Mount Washington is to the left, and Mount Eisenhower is center right.

- Location within New Hampshire
- Interactive map of Eisenhower Memorial Wayside
- Location: Carroll, New Hampshire, United States
- Coordinates: 44°14′23″N 71°25′31″W
- Area: 7 acres (2.8 ha)
- Established: 1979
- Administrator: New Hampshire Division of Parks and Recreation
- Website: Official website
- New Hampshire State Parks

Eisenhower Memorial Wayside is a 7-acre (2.8 ha) park in Carroll, New Hampshire, along Route 302. There are picnic tables and views of the Presidential Range in the White Mountain National Forest. The park was established in 1979 as a gift from the Bretton Woods Corporation and honors U.S. President Dwight D. Eisenhower.
