= Northwood Meadows State Park =

State park in Rockingham County, New Hampshire

- Location within New Hampshire
- Interactive map of Northwood Meadows State Park
- Location: Northwood, New Hampshire, United States
- Coordinates: 43°12′48″N 71°11′53″W
- Area: 674.5 acres (273.0 ha)
- Elevation: 594 feet (181 m)
- Established: 1990
- Administrator: New Hampshire Division of Parks and Recreation
- Website: Official website
- New Hampshire State Parks

Northwood Meadows State Park is a 674.5-acre (273.0 ha) state park in the town of Northwood, New Hampshire. Activities include nature walks, hiking, picnicking, fishing, non-motorized boating, biking, snowmobiling, and cross-country skiing.

The wooded park has a vast wetlands area that includes a pond created by a dammed brook. A universally-accessible graveled trail leads to the pond, known as Burtt Wildlife Pond, after M. Edward Burtt, who built the park's boulder-fringed roads and dam. The state purchased the land in 1990, which abuts the Forest Peters Wildlife Management Area.
