= Mollidgewock State Park =

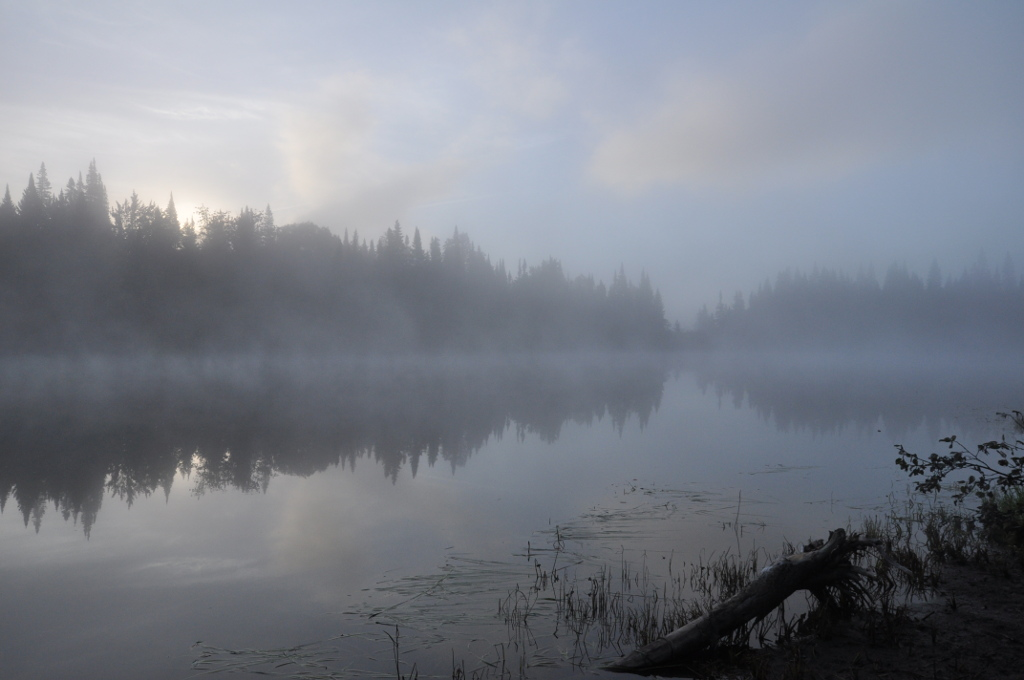
- The park is located on the Androscoggin River.
- Interactive map of Mollidgewock State Park
- Location: Errol, New Hampshire, United States
- Coordinates: 44°44′16″N 71°08′38″W
- Area: 46 acres (19 ha)
- Elevation: 1,217 feet (371 m)
- Established: Campground 1972; state park 1994
- Administrator: New Hampshire Division of Parks and Recreation
- Website: Official website
New Hampshire State Parks
Mollidgewock State Park
- Location within New Hampshire

Mollidgewock State Park is a 46-acre (19 ha) park in Errol, New Hampshire, on the Androscoggin River along Route 16 within Thirteen Mile Woods Scenic Area. Activities include camping, canoeing, fishing, hiking, wildlife watching, and picnicking. The campground offers 44 tent sites, 42 at the base camp and two at remote sites. There are picnic tables by the river. It is two miles (3.2 km) east of Androscoggin Wayside Park.
