= Ellacoya State Park =

State park in Belknap County, New Hampshire

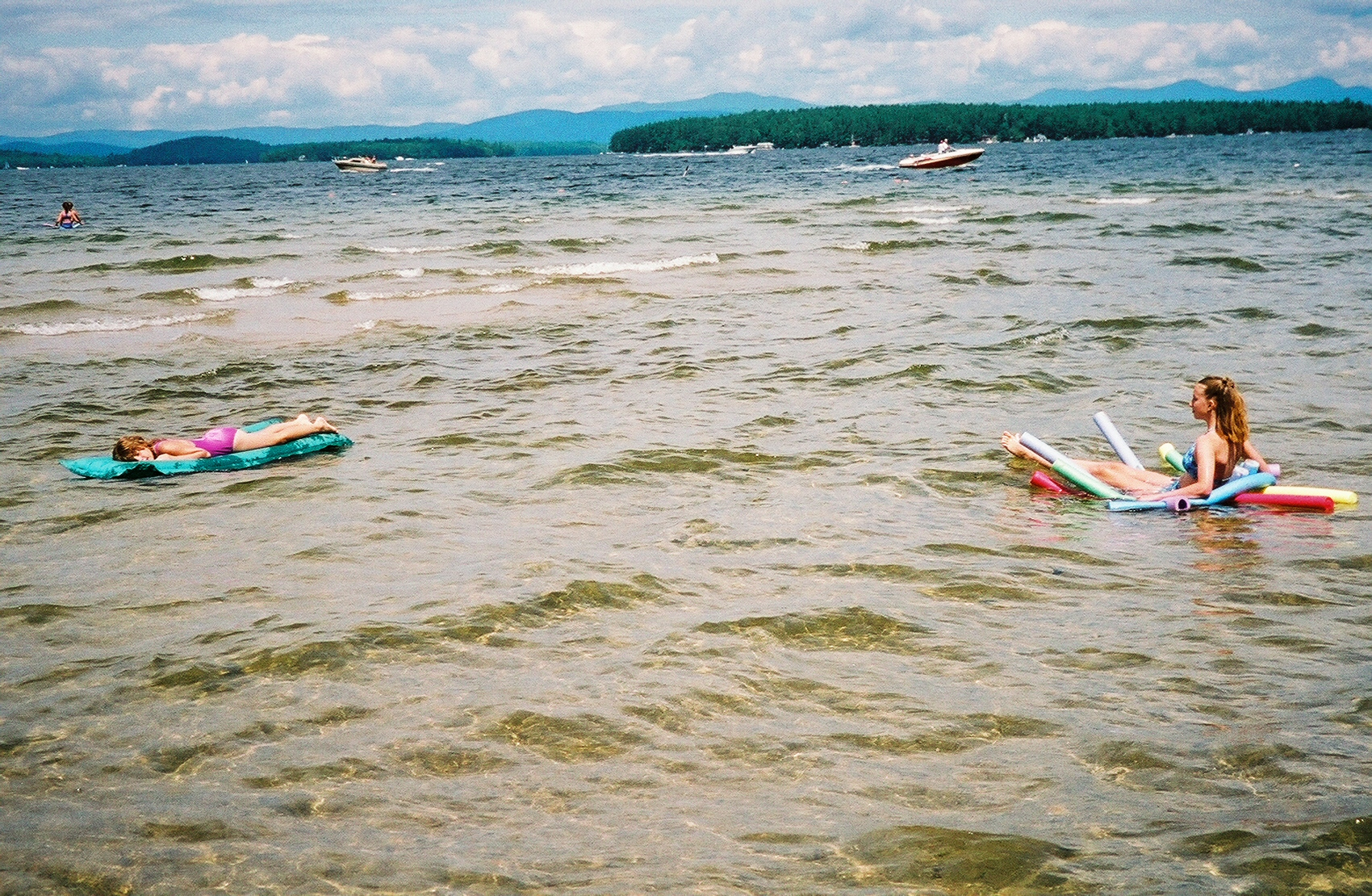
- Lake Winnipesaukee, Ellacoya State Park

- Location within New Hampshire Location within the United States
- Interactive map of Ellacoya State Park
- Location: Gilford, New Hampshire, United States
- Coordinates: 43°34′10″N 71°21′17″W
- Area: 82.7 acres (33.5 ha)
- Elevation: 666 feet (203 m)
- Established: 1956 (opened 1958)
- Administrator: New Hampshire Division of Parks and Recreation
- Website: Official website
- New Hampshire State Parks

Ellacoya State Park is a public recreation area located on the southwest shore of Lake Winnipesaukee in Gilford, New Hampshire. The state park has 600 feet (180 m) of beachfront, swimming, boating, picnicking, and campground.

== History ==
In 1956, the State of New Hampshire acquired the land that became Ellacoya State Park from Fredda Page for $75,000. Seven cottages that stood on the site were removed after being sold to Iola Dugas. An additional cottage, thought to have been built in 1935, was saved to become the park office. The park opened in 1958. The park's other buildings were built after 1980.
