= Umbagog Lake =

Lake in New Hampshire and Maine, United States

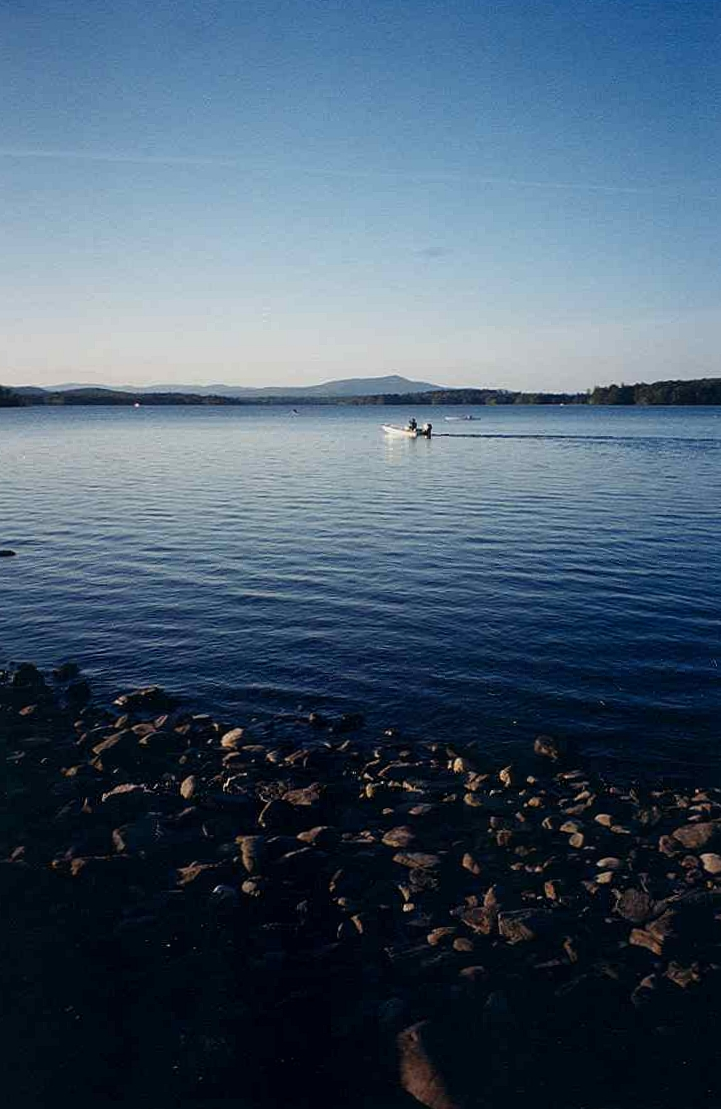

- Location within Maine Location within New Hampshire Location within the United States
- Location: Coös County, New Hampshire; Oxford County, Maine
- Coordinates: 44°45′25″N 71°2′57″W
- Primary inflows: Magalloway River; Rapid River; Dead Cambridge River
- Primary outflows: Androscoggin River
- Basin countries: United States
- Max. length: 10.4 miles (16.7 km)
- Max. width: 1.9 miles (3.1 km)
- Surface area: 7,850 acres (31.8 km^{2})
- Average depth: 10 feet (3 m)
- Max. depth: 45 feet (14 m)
- Surface elevation: 1,245 feet (379 m)
- Islands: Big Island; Blake Island; Bear Island; Metallak Island; Blueberry Island; "C" Island; Pine Island; Mosquito Island; Absalom Island; Black Island
- Settlements: Errol, New Hampshire; Upton, Maine

Umbagog Lake is a wilderness lake located in Coös County, New Hampshire, and Oxford County, Maine. It is one of the most pristine lakes in the state of New Hampshire. It lies in the towns of Errol, New Hampshire, and Upton, Maine, as well as the townships of Cambridge, New Hampshire, and Magalloway, Maine. The name Umbagog is properly pronounced with the stress on the second syllable (um-BAY-gog) and is said to come from the Abenaki word for "shallow water". Both "Lake Umbagog" and "Umbagog Lake" are commonly used and accepted when referring to the body of water.

== Geography ==
The lake is part of the Umbagog National Wildlife Refuge and Umbagog Lake State Park. Along its southernmost shore, there is a public campground and a public boat launch ramp which may be accessed from New Hampshire Route 26. There are 33 wilderness campsites, accessible only by boat, which are located around the lake. Two other boat launches are closer to the center of Errol: one is accessible from North Mountain Pond Road off New Hampshire Route 26 as one leaves east of Errol, while another can be found along New Hampshire Route 16 northeast of Errol, within the national wildlife refuge. An interesting feature along its northwest shore is an expansive natural floating island composed of generations of decomposing marshland vegetation. The area is abundant with wildlife, including coyote, wild turkey, bald eagle, osprey, bobcat, moose, rabbit, bear, loons and many other native species.

The lake runs almost 11 miles (18 km) north to south. Its surface area is 7,850 acres (31.8 km^{2}), making it the largest lake along the Maine/New Hampshire border. Its average depth is 10 feet (3.0 m), and its maximum depth is 45 feet (14 m). The lake's area and depth were markedly increased with the construction of a dam at Errol in the 19th century.

Umbagog Lake is fed by the Magalloway River, the Rapid River, and the Dead Cambridge River. It is the source of the Androscoggin River.

The lake is classified as a warmwater fishery, with observed species including smallmouth bass, chain pickerel, horned pout, and northern pike.

== Notable residents ==
- Metallak, Androscoggin elder

== See also ==
- List of lakes in Maine
- List of lakes in New Hampshire
