= Tip-Top House =

- U.S. National Register of Historic Places
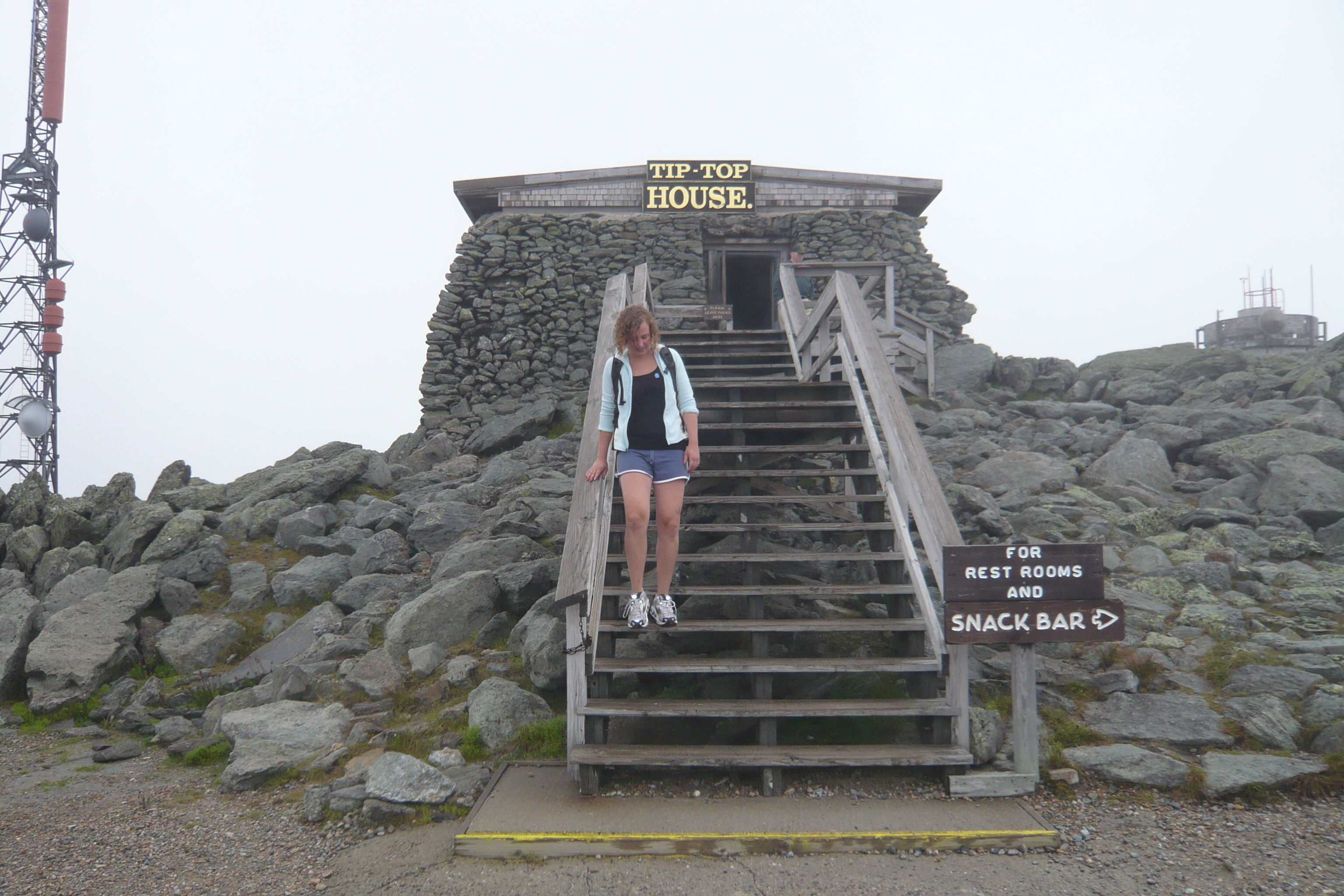

- Location within New Hampshire Location within the United States
- Location: Mt. Washington State Park, Sargent's Purchase, New Hampshire
- Coordinates: 44°16′14″N 71°18′14″W
- Area: less than one acre
- Built: 1853
- Architect: Samuel F. Spaulding; Joseph S. Hall
- NRHP reference No.: 82001673
- Added to NRHP: January 11, 1982

The Tip-Top House is a historic former hotel in Mount Washington State Park in Sargent's Purchase, New Hampshire, United States. Built in 1853, it is the oldest surviving building in the summit area of Mount Washington, and is believed by the state to be the oldest extant mountain-top hostelry in the world. It features exhibits concerning the mountain's history. Located near the modern summit building and other visitor facilities, it is open for a fee to visitors from early May to early October. It was added to the National Register of Historic Places in 1982.

== Description ==
The Tip-Top House stands directly adjacent to the summit of Mount Washington, at 6,288 feet (1,917 m) the tallest mountain in the northeastern United States. It is located on the southwest side of the summit, just north of the summit station of the Mount Washington Cog Railway and the parking area at the end of the Mount Washington Auto Road. It is a roughly rectangular structure, 1-1/2 stories in height, with walls of rough-cut granite. The stones are mortared together, but the joints are set deep and the mortar is barely discernible. The main entrance is set off-center on the southern short end, in a simple rectangular opening. The sides have rectangular window openings. The interior is largely reflective of a rebuilding effort following a 1915 fire, in which it was gutted.

== History ==
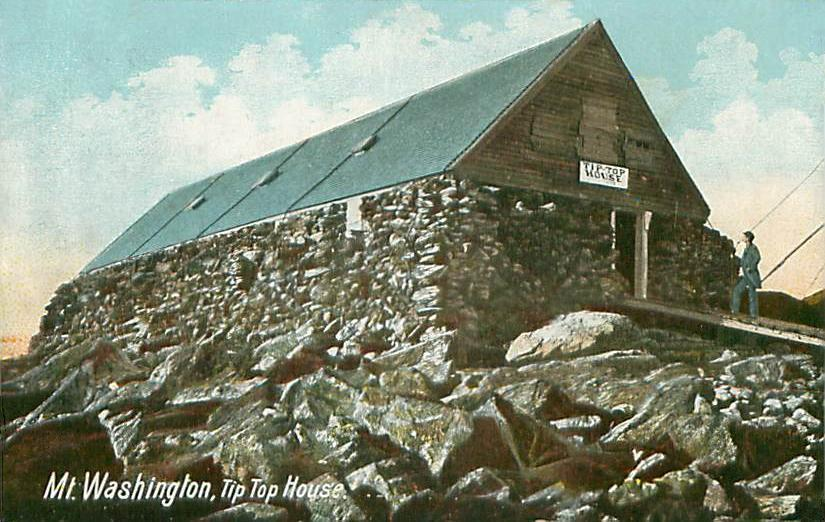
Postcard of the Tip-Top House from 1908

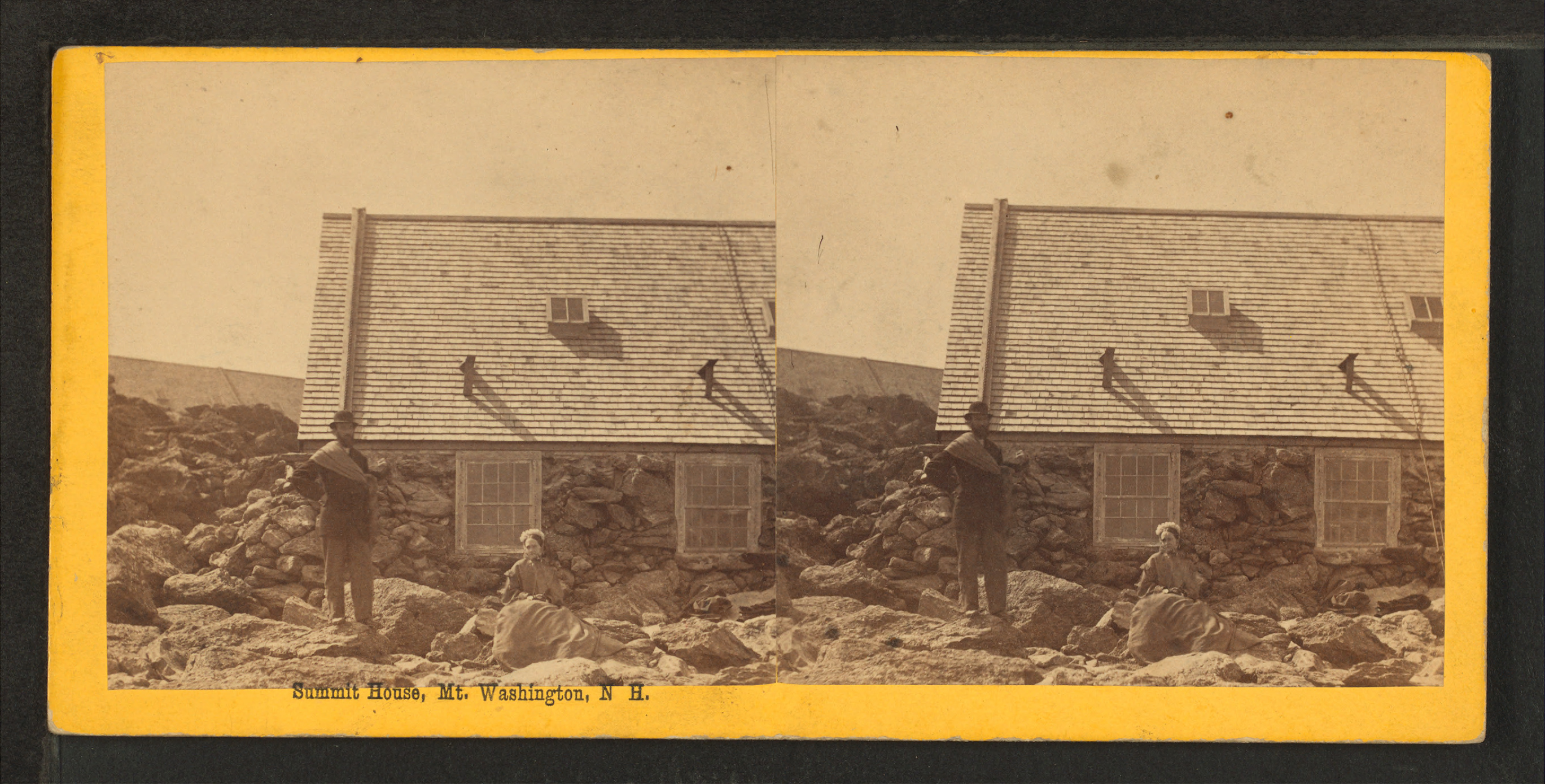
Stereoscopic image of the Summit House by the Bierstadt Brothers

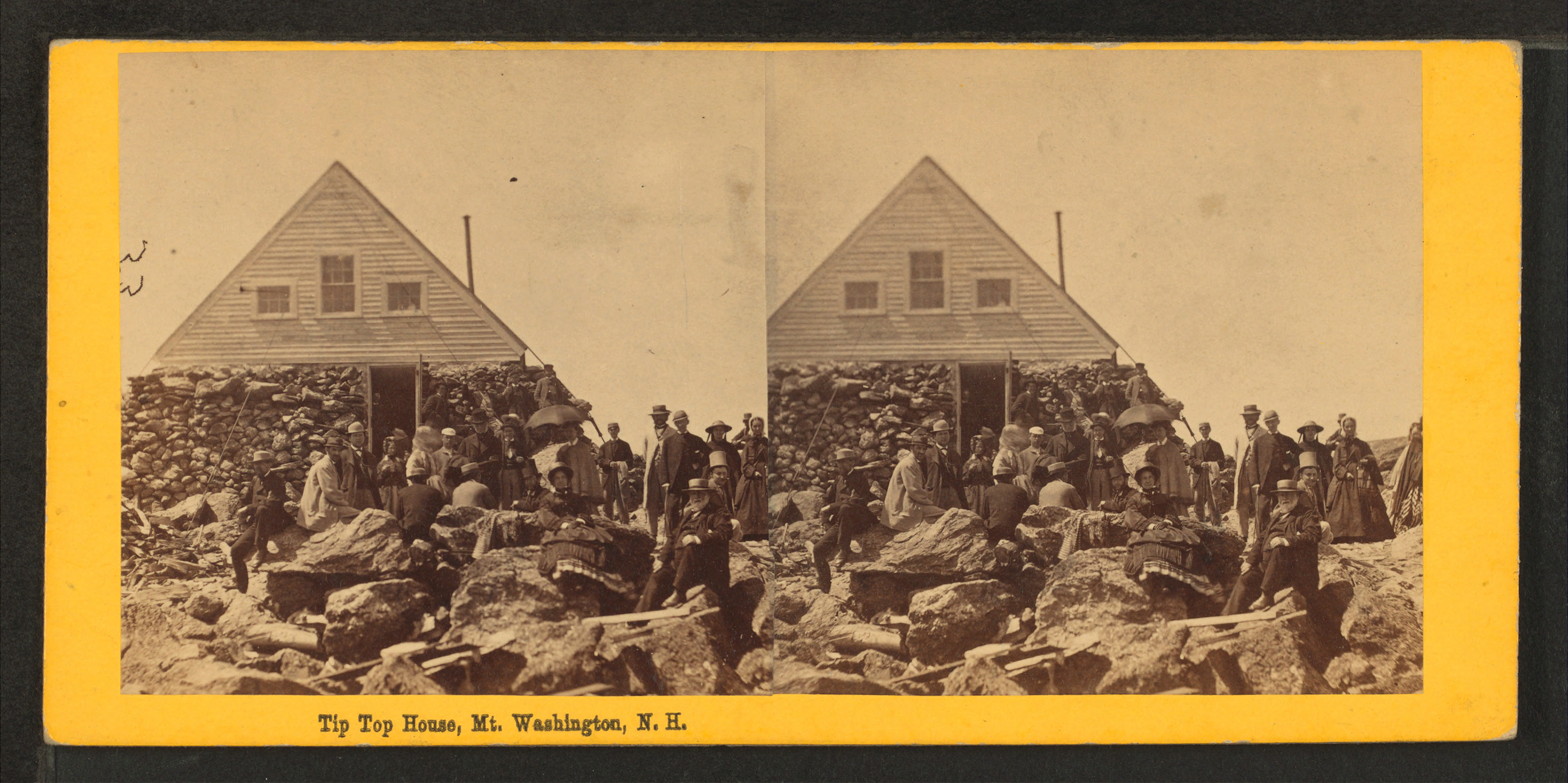
Stereoscopic image of Tip Top House by the Bierstadt Brothers

The building was erected on Mount Washington in 1853 to compete with the Summit House, a nearby hotel established in 1852. Built by Samuel F. Spaulding at a cost of $7,000, the Tip-Top House was made of rock blasted from the mountain. On clear days, a telescope was placed on its flat roof to create an observatory, although in the early 1860s the flat roof was replaced with a pitched roof. Beginning in 1877, the building functioned for seven years as a printing office for Among the Clouds, the mountain's newspaper. When the newspaper moved to a different location, the Tip-Top House was abandoned and fell into disrepair. A three-story, 91-room hotel was built atop Mount Washington, together with a weather observatory. All of these buildings were destroyed in the Great Fire of 1908, except the Tip-Top House, which was renovated to function again as a hotel. When the Summit House was replaced, however, the Tip-Top House burned; it was rebuilt as an annex to the Summit House, then abandoned in 1968. Now a state historic site, the Tip-Top House was restored in 1987, including its flat roof.

== See also ==
- National Register of Historic Places listings in Coos County, New Hampshire
