= Errol, New Hampshire =

- Town
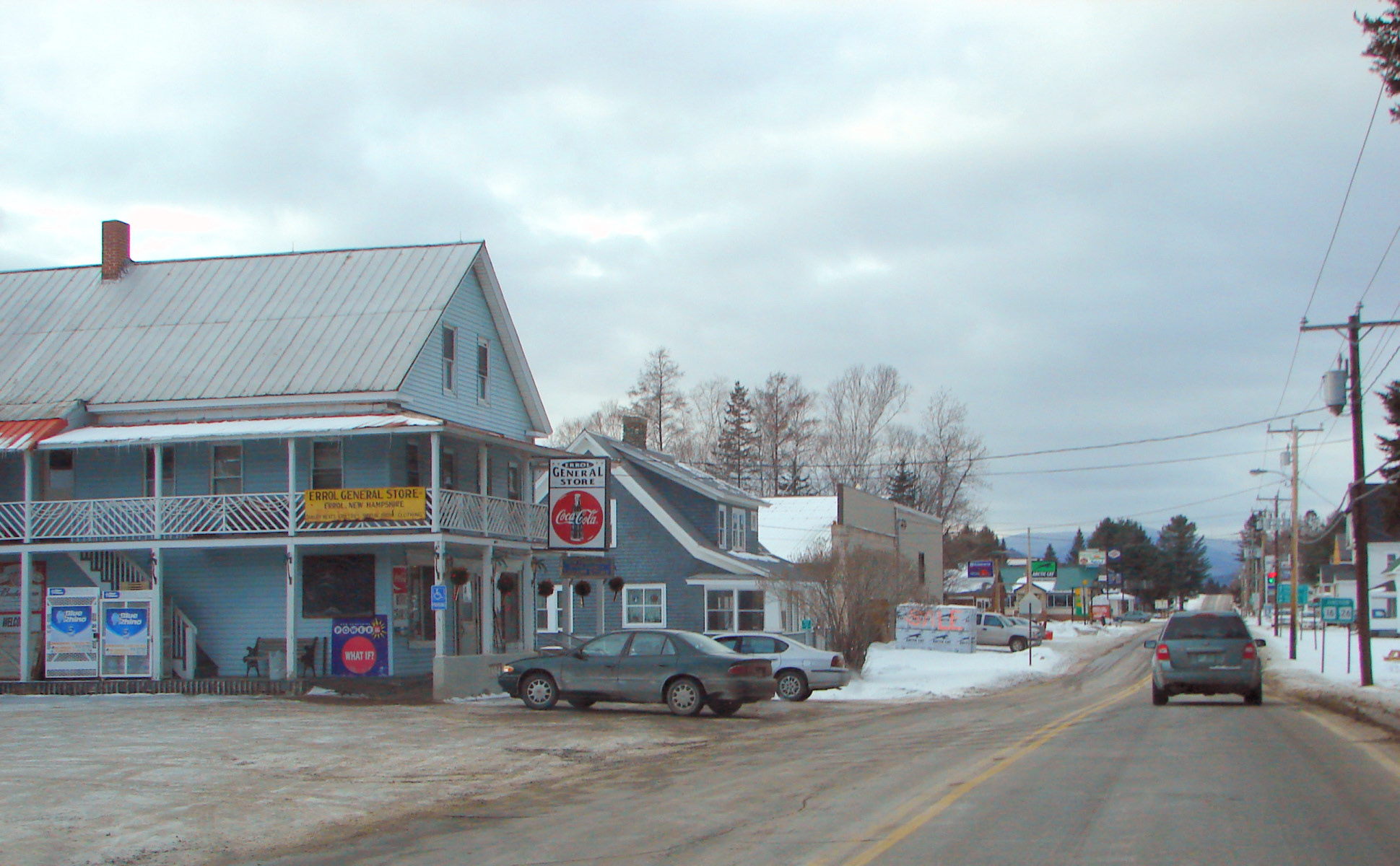
- Main Street in Errol

- Seal

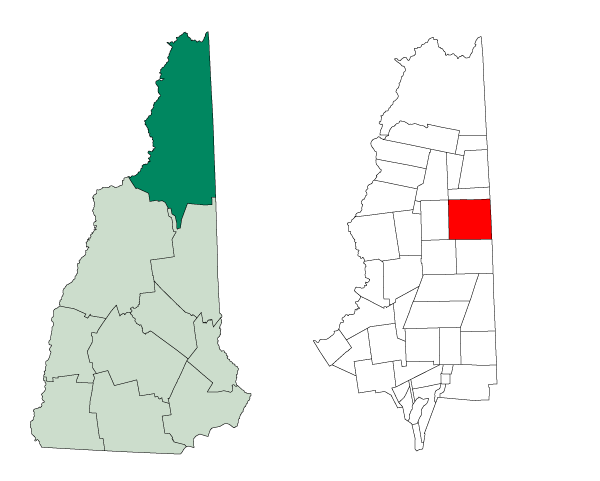
- Location in Coös County, New Hampshire
- Coordinates: 44°45′53″N 71°07′35″W
- Country: United States
- State: New Hampshire
- County: Coös
- Incorporated: 1836

Area
  - Total: 69.5 sq mi (179.9 km^{2})
  - Land: 60.3 sq mi (156.3 km^{2})
  - Water: 9.1 sq mi (23.5 km^{2}) 13.09%
- Elevation: 1,503 ft (458 m)

Population (2020)
  - Total: 298
  - Density: 4.9/sq mi (1.9/km^{2})
- Time zone: UTC-5 (Eastern)
  - Summer (DST): UTC-4 (Eastern)
- ZIP code: 03579
- Area code: 603
- FIPS code: 33-25140
- GNIS feature ID: 873593
- Website: www.errolnh.org

Errol is a town in Coös County, New Hampshire, United States. The population was 298 at the 2020 census, and an estimated 291 in 2025. It is located north of the White Mountains along Route 16 at its intersection of Route 26. It has a municipal airport with a single, unpaved runway (airport code ERR).

Errol is part of the Berlin, NH-VT micropolitan statistical area.

== History ==
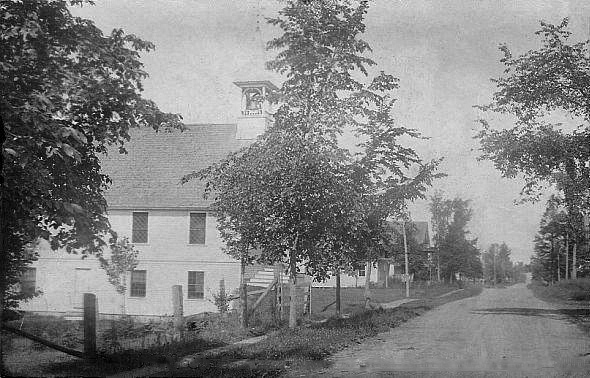
Main Street in 1914

Errol was granted by Governor John Wentworth to Timothy Ruggles and others in 1774, the name taken from Scotland's James Hay, 15th Earl of Erroll. In 1789, proprietors of the Errol grant petitioned the General Court that towns between Conway and Errol be required to pay for "a good connecting road". The legislature approved the measure in 1781, mandating what is today Route 16. A winter trade route to Andover, Maine was built in 1804, connecting Errol to Portland via what is now Route 26. The first settlers arrived at Errol in 1806, and by 1820 the population was 36. It was incorporated in 1836.

Although the soil was considered generally poor, it proved suitable for hay, oats and potatoes. With vast forests, the town's chief occupation was lumbering. By 1859, when the population was 130, the town had two sawmills, one gristmill and one clapboard machine.

== Geography ==
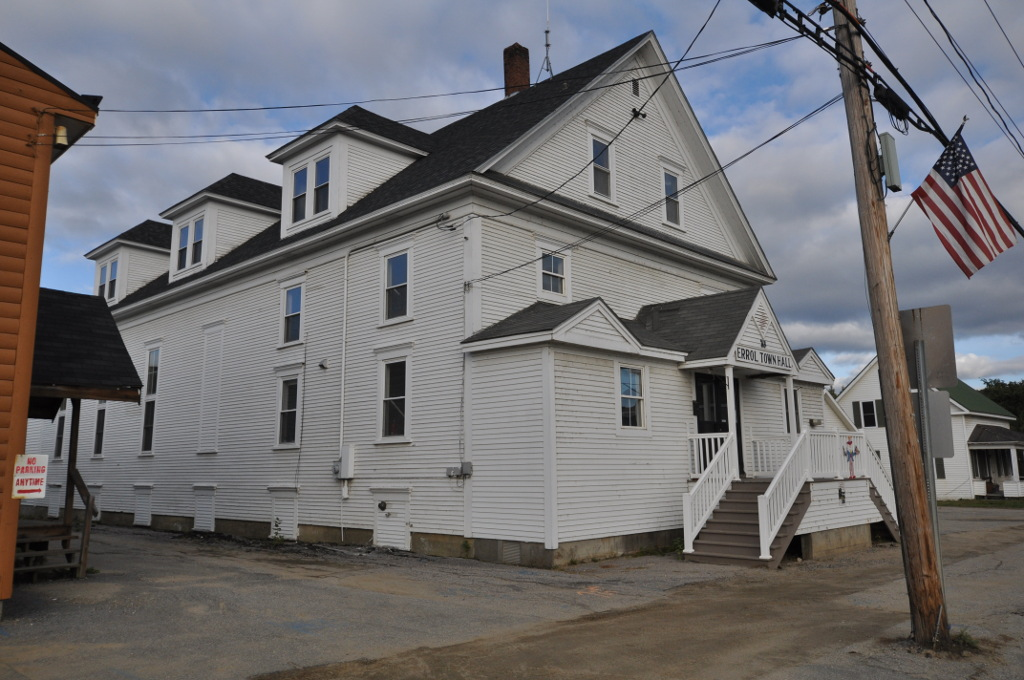
Town hall

According to the United States Census Bureau, the town has a total area of 69.5 square miles (179.9 km^{2}), of which 60.3 square miles (156.3 km^{2}) are land and 9.1 square miles (23.5 km^{2}) are water, comprising 13.09% of the town. The Androscoggin River begins in Errol, where the Magalloway River joins the outlet of Umbagog Lake. The town's elevation reaches 2,350 feet (720 m) above sea level atop a bump above Signal Pond near the town's western boundary. Errol lies fully within the Androscoggin River watershed.

The town is served by state routes 16 and 26. NH Route 16 extends north towards the township of Wentworth Location, and it extends south through Dummer and Milan into the city of Berlin. NH Route 26 extends east towards the township of Cambridge and eventually into Maine. It extends west through Dixville Notch to the town of Colebrook.

=== Adjacent municipalities ===
- Wentworth Location (north)
- North Oxford, Maine (northeast)
- Upton, Maine (southeast)
- Cambridge (south)
- Dummer (southwest)
- Millsfield (west)
- Dixville (northwest)

=== Climate ===
This climatic region has large seasonal temperature differences, with warm to hot (and often humid) summers and cold (sometimes severely cold) winters. According to the Köppen Climate Classification system, Errol has a humid continental climate, abbreviated "Dfb" on climate maps.

Climate data for Errol Airport, New Hampshire (1991–2020 normals)
Month	Jan	Feb	Mar	Apr	May	Jun	Jul	Aug	Sep	Oct	Nov	Dec	Year
Mean daily maximum °F (°C)	23.4 (−4.8)	26.0 (−3.3)	35.5 (1.9)	48.7 (9.3)	62.8 (17.1)	71.8 (22.1)	76.9 (24.9)	75.3 (24.1)	68.3 (20.2)	54.9 (12.7)	41.1 (5.1)	29.3 (−1.5)	51.2 (10.7)
Daily mean °F (°C)	12.3 (−10.9)	12.7 (−10.7)	23.4 (−4.8)	37.3 (2.9)	50.7 (10.4)	60.0 (15.6)	64.5 (18.1)	62.8 (17.1)	55.6 (13.1)	43.5 (6.4)	32.1 (0.1)	19.8 (−6.8)	39.6 (4.2)
Mean daily minimum °F (°C)	1.2 (−17.1)	−0.6 (−18.1)	11.3 (−11.5)	25.9 (−3.4)	38.5 (3.6)	48.2 (9.0)	52.0 (11.1)	50.2 (10.1)	42.9 (6.1)	32.0 (0.0)	23.1 (−4.9)	10.2 (−12.1)	27.9 (−2.3)
Average precipitation inches (mm)	2.99 (76)	2.62 (67)	2.82 (72)	3.46 (88)	3.63 (92)	4.75 (121)	4.13 (105)	4.17 (106)	3.65 (93)	5.12 (130)	3.51 (89)	3.75 (95)	44.6 (1,134)
Source: NOAA

== Demographics ==
Historical population
Census	Pop.	Note	%±
1810	38		—
1820	26		−31.6%
1830	82		215.4%
1840	104		26.8%
1850	138		32.7%
1860	178		29.0%
1870	178		0.0%
1880	161		−9.6%
1890	178		10.6%
1900	305		71.3%
1910	211		−30.8%
1920	241		14.2%
1930	293		21.6%
1940	235		−19.8%
1950	224		−4.7%
1960	220		−1.8%
1970	199		−9.5%
1980	313		57.3%
1990	292		−6.7%
2000	298		2.1%
2010	291		−2.3%
2020	298		2.4%
U.S. Decennial Census

At the 2000 census there were 298 people, 137 households, and 90 families living in the town. The population density was 4.9 people per square mile (1.9/km^{2}). There were 447 housing units at an average density of 7.3 per square mile (2.8/km^{2}). The racial makeup of the town was 98.66% White, 0.34% Pacific Islander, 0.67% from other races, and 0.34% from two or more races. Hispanic or Latino of any race were 1.01%.

Of the 137 households 19.7% had children under the age of 18 living with them, 60.6% were married couples living together, 2.2% had a female householder with no husband present, and 34.3% were non-families. 24.8% of households were one person and 9.5% were one person aged 65 or older. The average household size was 2.15 and the average family size was 2.56.

The age distribution was 16.4% under the age of 18, 3.4% from 18 to 24, 27.5% from 25 to 44, 35.2% from 45 to 64, and 17.4% 65 or older. The median age was 47 years. For every 100 females, there were 108.4 males. For every 100 females age 18 and over, there were 114.7 males.

The median household income was $35,625 and the median family income was $47,500. Males had a median income of $37,250 versus $20,250 for females. The per capita income for the town was $22,440. About 9.8% of families and 13.1% of the population were below the poverty line, including 24.2% of those under the age of eighteen and 15.2% of those sixty five or over.

== Education ==
Errol students in grades 7–12 are bused to Berlin Middle High School in Berlin.

== Sites of interest ==
- Androscoggin Wayside Park
- Mollidgewock State Park
- Umbagog Lake State Park
- L. L. Cote Sports Center
