= Mount Washington Observatory =

Observation station and nonprofit institution atop Mount Washington, New Hampshire

Coordinates: 44°16′13″N 71°18′12″W

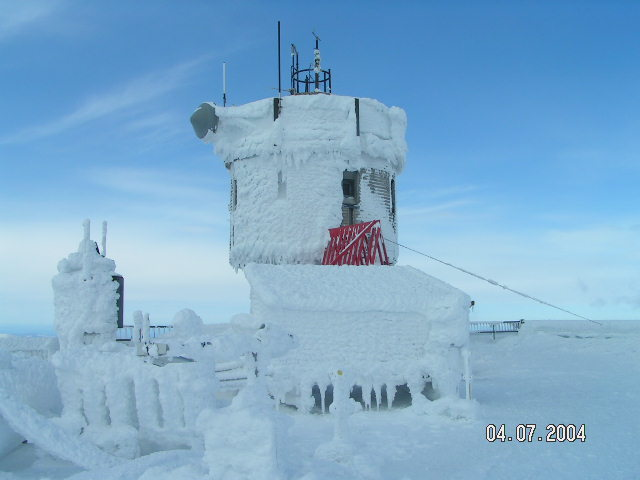
- Mount Washington Observatory in 2004
- Type: Private Non-Profit Organization
- Genre: Weather Observation and Education
- Predecessor: U.S. Signal Service
- Founded: 1932
- Headquarters: Sargent's Purchase, New Hampshire, United States
- Key people: Executive Director: Drew Bush; Chair of the Board: Rob Kirsch
- Revenue: 1,788,138 United States dollar (2017)
- Total assets: 5,678,223 United States dollar (2022)
- Website: mountwashington.org

The Mount Washington Observatory (MWObs) is a private, non-profit scientific and educational institution organized under the laws of the state of New Hampshire. The weather observation station is located on the summit of Mount Washington in New Hampshire. The first regular meteorological observations on Mount Washington were conducted by the U.S. Signal Service, a precursor of the Weather Bureau, from 1870 to 1892.

== History ==
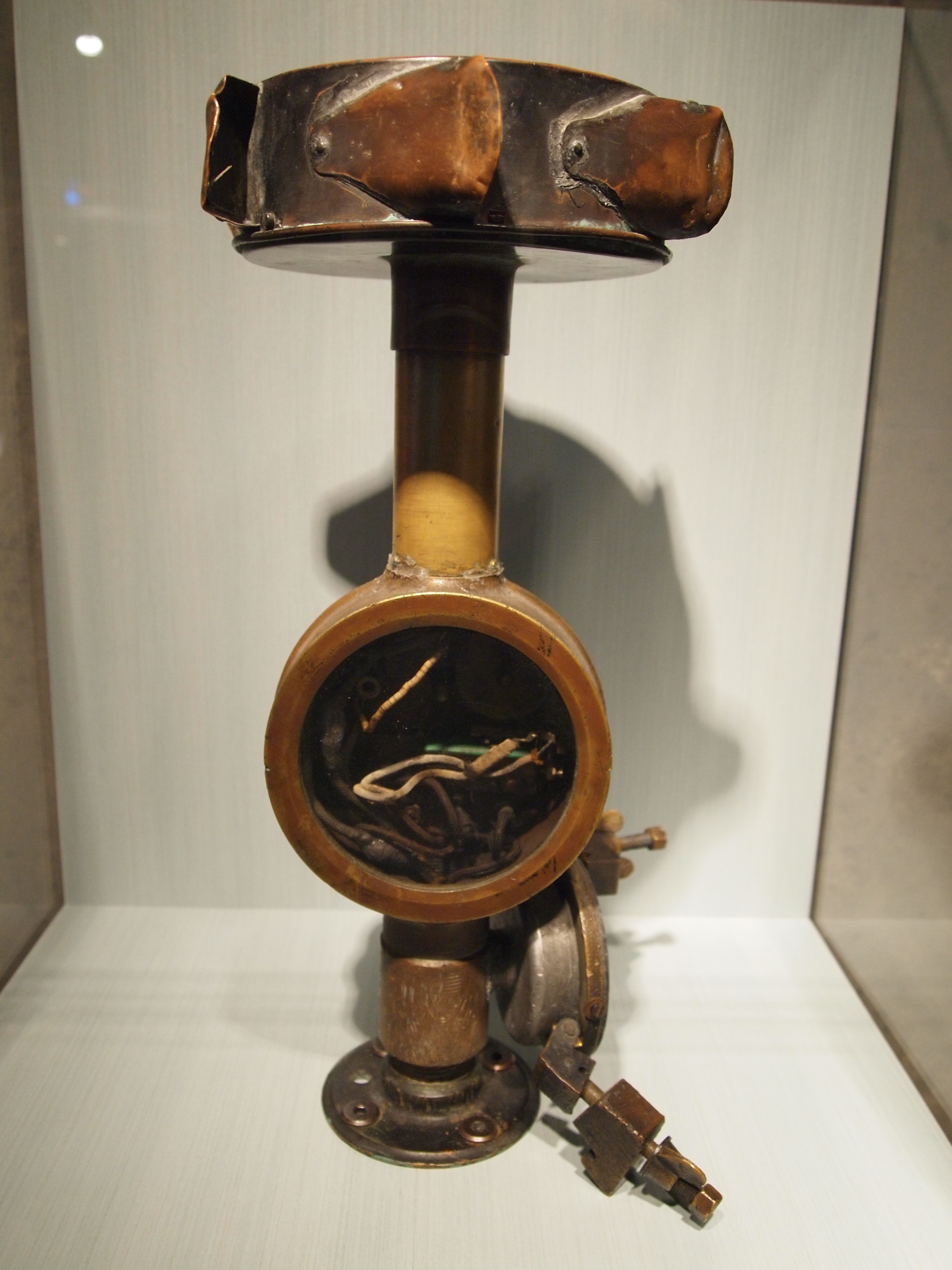
The original anemometer that measured The Big Wind in 1934 at Mount Washington Observatory

The U.S. Signal Service, a predecessor to the Weather Bureau, occupied the summit and kept records from 1870 to 1892. Starting in 1932, the current observatory began keeping records. On April 12, 1934, the observatory staff recorded a wind gust of 231 mph that at the time was the highest recorded wind speed in the world, a record that was held until 1996. The observatory's weather data have accumulated into a valuable climate record since. Temperature and humidity readings have been collected using a sling psychrometer, a simple device containing two mercury thermometers. Where most unstaffed weather stations have undergone technology upgrades, consistent use of the sling psychrometer has helped provide scientific precision to the Mount Washington climate record.

The observatory makes prominent use of the slogan "Home of the World's Worst Weather", a claim that originated with a 1940 article by Charles Brooks (the man generally given the majority of credit for creating the Mount Washington Observatory), titled "The Worst Weather In the World" (even though the article concluded that Mt. Washington most likely did not have the world's worst weather). The Sherman Adams summit building, named for the 67th Governor of New Hampshire, houses the observatory; it is closed to the public during the winter and hikers are not allowed inside the building except for emergencies and pre-arranged guided tours.

== Climatic data ==
Climate data for Mount Washington, elev. 6,267 ft (1,910.2 m) near the summit (1991–2020 normals, extremes 1933–present)
Month	Jan	Feb	Mar	Apr	May	Jun	Jul	Aug	Sep	Oct	Nov	Dec	Year
Record high °F (°C)	48 (9)	48 (9)	54 (12)	60 (16)	66 (19)	72 (22)	71 (22)	72 (22)	69 (21)	62 (17)	52 (11)	47 (8)	72 (22)
Mean maximum °F (°C)	38.7 (3.7)	35.6 (2.0)	40.8 (4.9)	49.0 (9.4)	58.8 (14.9)	64.5 (18.1)	65.4 (18.6)	64.2 (17.9)	61.4 (16.3)	53.8 (12.1)	45.8 (7.7)	39.8 (4.3)	67.2 (19.6)
Mean daily maximum °F (°C)	14.9 (−9.5)	14.8 (−9.6)	20.8 (−6.2)	30.7 (−0.7)	42.5 (5.8)	51.4 (10.8)	55.3 (12.9)	54.2 (12.3)	49.1 (9.5)	37.7 (3.2)	28.4 (−2.0)	20.1 (−6.6)	35.0 (1.7)
Daily mean °F (°C)	5.8 (−14.6)	5.9 (−14.5)	12.9 (−10.6)	23.7 (−4.6)	36.3 (2.4)	45.5 (7.5)	49.9 (9.9)	48.7 (9.3)	43.1 (6.2)	31.3 (−0.4)	20.8 (−6.2)	11.8 (−11.2)	28.0 (−2.2)
Mean daily minimum °F (°C)	−3.2 (−19.6)	−3.0 (−19.4)	4.9 (−15.1)	16.7 (−8.5)	30.2 (−1.0)	39.6 (4.2)	44.5 (6.9)	43.2 (6.2)	37.1 (2.8)	24.9 (−3.9)	13.1 (−10.5)	3.5 (−15.8)	21.0 (−6.1)
Mean minimum °F (°C)	−28.6 (−33.7)	−25.2 (−31.8)	−19.4 (−28.6)	−1.1 (−18.4)	14.0 (−10.0)	25.7 (−3.5)	34.4 (1.3)	31.4 (−0.3)	21.3 (−5.9)	8.3 (−13.2)	−5.8 (−21.0)	−20.8 (−29.3)	−32.3 (−35.7)
Record low °F (°C)	−47 (−44)	−47 (−44)	−38 (−39)	−20 (−29)	−2 (−19)	8 (−13)	24 (−4)	20 (−7)	9 (−13)	−5 (−21)	−26 (−32)	−46 (−43)	−47 (−44)
Average precipitation inches (mm)	5.74 (146)	5.45 (138)	6.72 (171)	7.31 (186)	7.68 (195)	8.59 (218)	8.93 (227)	7.72 (196)	7.66 (195)	9.99 (254)	8.09 (205)	7.35 (187)	91.23 (2,317)
Average snowfall inches (cm)	41.4 (105)	43.3 (110)	46.2 (117)	33.1 (84)	12.9 (33)	1.3 (3.3)	0.0 (0.0)	0.1 (0.25)	1.2 (3.0)	19.0 (48)	35.6 (90)	47.7 (121)	281.8 (716)
Average extreme snow depth inches (cm)	14.1 (36)	16.3 (41)	17.6 (45)	14.5 (37)	6.1 (15)	0.5 (1.3)	0.0 (0.0)	0.0 (0.0)	0.3 (0.76)	5.7 (14)	8.3 (21)	12.7 (32)	21.0 (53)
Average precipitation days (≥ 0.01 in)	20.0	18.3	19.7	18.3	17.4	17.6	17.5	15.5	13.7	18.1	19.2	21.0	216.3
Average snowy days (≥ 0.1 in)	19.6	18.1	18.0	14.1	6.5	1.2	0.2	0.2	1.3	9.9	15.1	19.7	123.9
Mean monthly sunshine hours	92.0	106.9	127.6	143.2	171.3	151.3	145.0	130.5	127.2	127.1	82.4	83.1	1,487.6
Percentage possible sunshine	32	36	34	35	37	33	31	30	34	37	29	30	33
Source 1: NOAA (sun 1961–1990)
Source 2: Mount Washington Observatory (extremes 1933–present)

wikitext

Climate data for Mount Washington, New Hampshire (Summit)
Month	Jan	Feb	Mar	Apr	May	Jun	Jul	Aug	Sep	Oct	Nov	Dec	Year
Record low wind chill	−102.7	−108.4	−95.0	−59.0	−25.0	−10.0	2.0	0.0	−15.0	−37.0	−56.0	−85.0	−108.4
Source: Mount Washington Observatory

== Partners ==
The Mount Washington Observatory receives much of its support from contributing members. However, over the years the MWObs has also come to receive support from several company and organizational partners, including L.L. Bean, Eastern Mountain Sports (EMS), Cranmore Mountain Resort, the Mt. Washington Auto Road, and the Mt. Washington Valley Chamber of Commerce. In 2011, EMS replaced L.L. Bean as the official outfitter of the Observatory.

The United States Postal Service maintains a small post office for outgoing mail, located in the Sherman Adams building at the summit; the ZIP Code is 03589.

== See also ==
- Mount Washington State Park
- Blue Hill Observatory
