= Umbagog National Wildlife Refuge =

National wildlife refuge in the United States

- IUCN category IV (habitat/species management area)
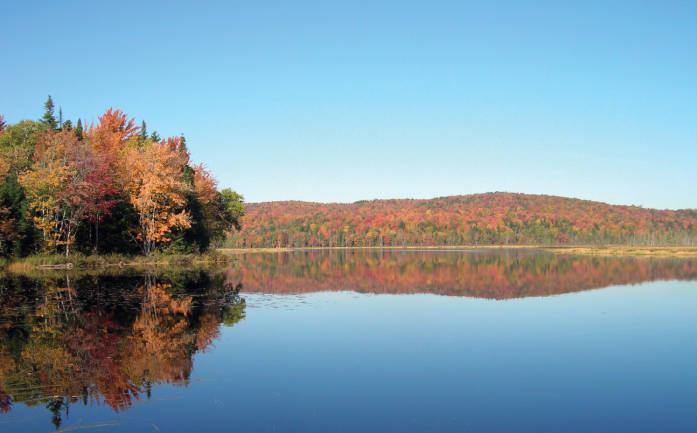
- Umbagog National Wildlife Refuge

- Location within the United States
- Location: Oxford County, Maine; Coös County, New Hampshire; United States
- Nearest city: Errol, New Hampshire
- Coordinates: 44°47′30″N 71°05′00″W
- Area: 25,650 acres (103.8 km^{2})
- Established: 1992
- Governing body: U.S. Fish and Wildlife Service
- Website: Umbagog National Wildlife Refuge

Located in Coös County, New Hampshire, and Oxford County, Maine, Umbagog National Wildlife Refuge is a northern treasure in the National Wildlife Refuge System. The diversity of exceptional habitats provides excellent breeding and foraging areas for migratory birds, endangered species, resident wildlife, and rare plants. The refuge protects over 25,650 acres (103.8 km^{2}) of wetland and forested upland habitat along Umbagog Lake. About 70% of its area is in New Hampshire and 30% in Maine.

== Habitat and wildlife ==
Umbagog Lake has extensive wetland complexes that are excellent for waterfowl production. One example is Harper's Meadow. In 1972, the Secretary of the Interior designated part of the wetlands at Harper's Meadow as a Floating Island National Natural Landmark. This designation recognized the floating bog and wetlands as a significant natural area, one of a very special group of places illustrating the diversity of the country’s natural history.

Umbagog Lake is more than 7 miles (11 km) in length and covers more than 7,000 acres (2,800 ha), making it the largest lake along the New Hampshire/Maine border. It has an average depth of only 15 feet (4.6 m).

The Umbagog area, unique in its habitats, provides home to many different species. Situated at the southern range of the boreal forests and the northern range of the deciduous forests, the Umbagog area is a transition zone providing homes to species of both habitat types. A total of 229 bird species have been observed on the refuge, and 137 species are known to breed there. There are many species of songbirds, including 24 varieties of warblers. The abundance of fish in the lakes and rivers provide food for the local populations of osprey and bald eagles. Mink, river otter, muskrat, and beaver can be seen in the lakes and rivers, while raccoons, black bears, coyotes, fishers, red foxes, marten, bobcats, gray foxes, white-tailed deer and a dense population of moose inhabit the uplands. The extensive wetlands and marshes provide ideal habitat for waterfowl, such as common mergansers, American black ducks, common goldeneye and common loons.

The area provides habitat for raptor species such as the bald eagle. In 1989, bald eagles successfully nested in New Hampshire on Umbagog Lake for the first time since 1949.

Migratory non-game birds like the northern harrier, American bittern and great blue heron depend on habitat around Umbagog Lake. Abundant fish populations and wetland habitat support one of the highest concentrations of nesting osprey in New Hampshire. The areas forested wetlands support good numbers of black ducks, ring-necked ducks, and goldeneye. Wood ducks, mallards, hooded and common mergansers also nest in the area. The lake provides habitat for migrating scaup, three varieties of scoters and Canada geese.
