= Milan, New Hampshire =

- Town
- Milan, New Hampshire, from the northwest

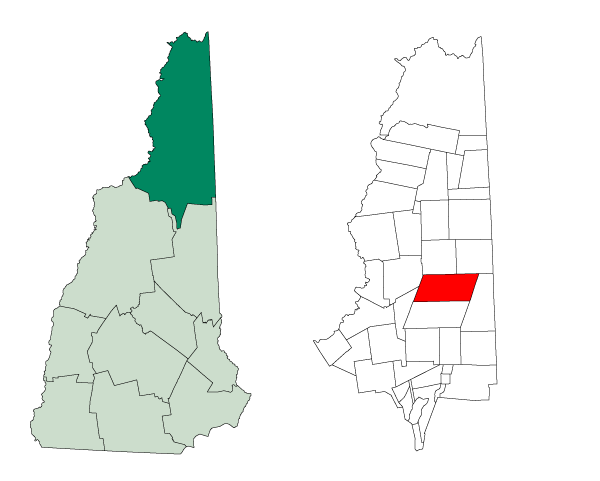
- Location in Coos County, New Hampshire
- Coordinates: 44°34′24″N 71°11′06″W
- Country: United States
- State: New Hampshire
- County: Coos
- Incorporated: 1824
- Villages: Milan; West Milan

Area
  - Total: 64.45 sq mi (166.92 km^{2})
  - Land: 63.69 sq mi (164.95 km^{2})
  - Water: 0.76 sq mi (1.97 km^{2}) 1.18%
- Elevation: 1,437 ft (438 m)

Population (2020)
  - Total: 1,358
  - Density: 21/sq mi (8.2/km^{2})
- Time zone: UTC-5 (Eastern)
  - Summer (DST): UTC-4 (Eastern)
- ZIP code: 03588
- Area code: 603
- FIPS code: 33-47860
- GNIS feature ID: 873665
- Website: www.townofmilan.com

Milan (/ˈmaɪlən/ MY-lən) is a town in Coös County, New Hampshire, United States. The population was 1,358 at the 2020 census. It is part of the Berlin, NH-VT Micropolitan Statistical Area.

== History ==
Milan village in the 19th century

Originally named "Paulsburg" in 1771 after Paul Wentworth, the town was incorporated on December 16, 1824. In that year, Governor Levi Woodbury authorized a name change to "Milan".

Prior to 1820, there were but few inhabitants. In 1819, the population was approximately fourteen; ten years passed and the number had increased four-fold.

== Geography ==
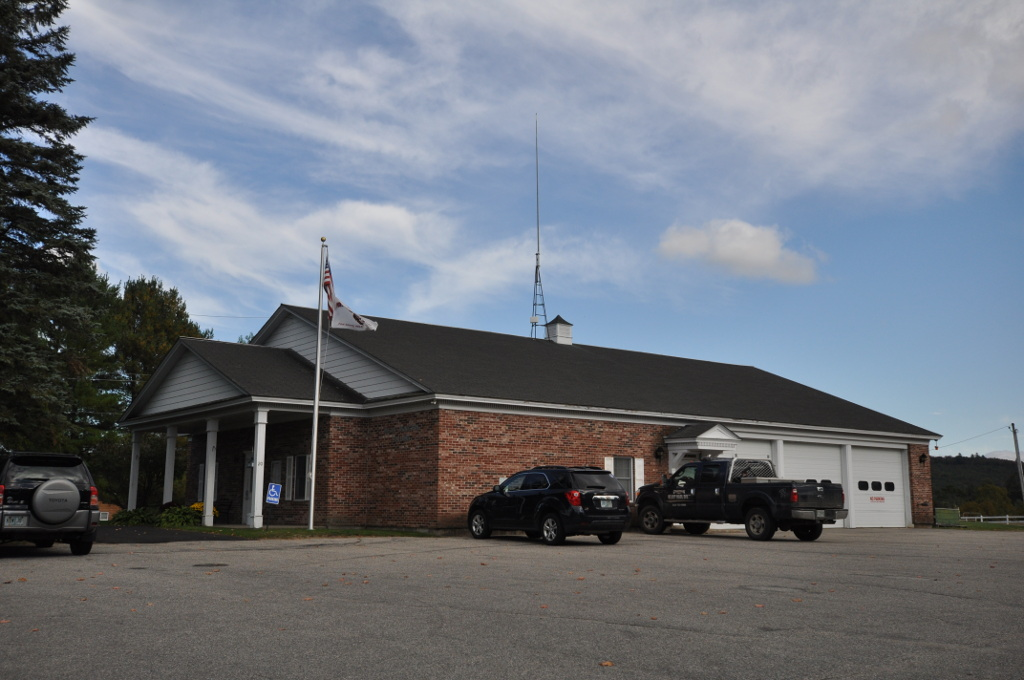
Milan Municipal Building

According to the United States Census Bureau, the town has a total area of 64.4 square miles (166.9 km^{2}), of which 63.7 square miles (165.0 km^{2}) are land and 0.8 square miles (2.0 km^{2}), or 1.18%, are water. The highest point is the summit of Deer Ridge, at 2,808 feet (856 m) above sea level.

=== Adjacent municipalities ===
- Dummer (north)
- Cambridge (northeast)
- Success (east)
- Berlin (south)
- Kilkenny (west)
- Stark (northwest)

=== Climate ===
Berlin Municipal Airport is an airport in Milan. The town has a humid continental climate (Köppen Dfb).

Climate data for Berlin Municipal Airport, New Hampshire, 1991–2020 normals: 1158ft (353m)
Month	Jan	Feb	Mar	Apr	May	Jun	Jul	Aug	Sep	Oct	Nov	Dec	Year
Mean daily maximum °F (°C)	27.0 (−2.8)	30.2 (−1.0)	38.9 (3.8)	52.6 (11.4)	66.6 (19.2)	75.1 (23.9)	79.8 (26.6)	78.2 (25.7)	70.9 (21.6)	57.4 (14.1)	44.0 (6.7)	32.2 (0.1)	54.4 (12.4)
Daily mean °F (°C)	14.8 (−9.6)	16.6 (−8.6)	26.5 (−3.1)	39.8 (4.3)	51.8 (11.0)	61.0 (16.1)	65.8 (18.8)	64.2 (17.9)	56.6 (13.7)	44.7 (7.1)	33.4 (0.8)	21.8 (−5.7)	41.4 (5.2)
Mean daily minimum °F (°C)	2.5 (−16.4)	3.0 (−16.1)	14.0 (−10.0)	27.0 (−2.8)	37.1 (2.8)	46.9 (8.3)	51.8 (11.0)	50.1 (10.1)	42.4 (5.8)	32.0 (0.0)	22.7 (−5.2)	11.5 (−11.4)	28.4 (−2.0)
Average precipitation inches (mm)	2.00 (51)	1.66 (42)	2.07 (53)	3.07 (78)	3.48 (88)	4.26 (108)	4.04 (103)	3.94 (100)	3.12 (79)	3.74 (95)	2.78 (71)	2.31 (59)	36.47 (927)
Source: NOAA

== Demographics ==
Historical population
Census	Pop.	Note	%±
1830	243		—
1840	386		58.8%
1850	493		27.7%
1860	789		60.0%
1870	710		−10.0%
1880	895		26.1%
1890	1,029		15.0%
1900	1,135		10.3%
1910	924		−18.6%
1920	730		−21.0%
1930	719		−1.5%
1940	782		8.8%
1950	743		−5.0%
1960	661		−11.0%
1970	713		7.9%
1980	1,013		42.1%
1990	1,295		27.8%
2000	1,331		2.8%
2010	1,337		0.5%
2020	1,358		1.6%
U.S. Decennial Census

As of the census of 2000, there were 1,331 people, 532 households, and 388 families residing in the town. The population density was 21.6 inhabitants per square mile (8.3/km^{2}). There were 756 housing units at an average density of 12.2 per square mile (4.7/km^{2}). The racial makeup of the town was 98.95% White, 0.08% African American, 0.30% Native American, 0.08% Asian, 0.23% from other races, and 0.38% from two or more races.

There were 532 households, out of which 31.8% had children under the age of 18 living with them, 62.4% were married couples living together, 5.5% had a female householder with no husband present, and 26.9% were non-families. 21.4% of all households were made up of individuals, and 7.9% had someone living alone who was 65 years of age or older. The average household size was 2.50 and the average family size was 2.92.

In the town, the population was spread out, with 25.8% under the age of 18, 3.7% from 18 to 24, 29.8% from 25 to 44, 28.5% from 45 to 64, and 12.3% who were 65 years of age or older. The median age was 41 years. For every 100 females, there were 105.1 males. For every 100 females age 18 and over, there were 107.1 males.

The median income for a household in the town was $40,966, and the median income for a family was $47,361. Males had a median income of $32,500 versus $20,670 for females. The per capita income for the town was $19,818. About 3.0% of families and 5.7% of the population were below the poverty line, including 7.0% of those under age 18 and 13.8% of those age 65 or over.

== Sites of interest ==
- Milan Hill State Park
- New Hampshire historical marker no. 227: The Nansen Ski Jump
- New Hampshire historical marker no. 284: Betty Brook
