= New Hampshire Division of Parks and Recreation =

Government agency in the U.S. state of New Hampshire

Agency overview
- Formed: 1935
- Jurisdiction: New Hampshire
- Headquarters: 172 Pembroke Road; Concord, New Hampshire
- Agency executive: Philip A. Bryce, Director
- Parent agency: New Hampshire Department of Natural and Cultural Resources
- Website: www.nhstateparks.org/about-us/division

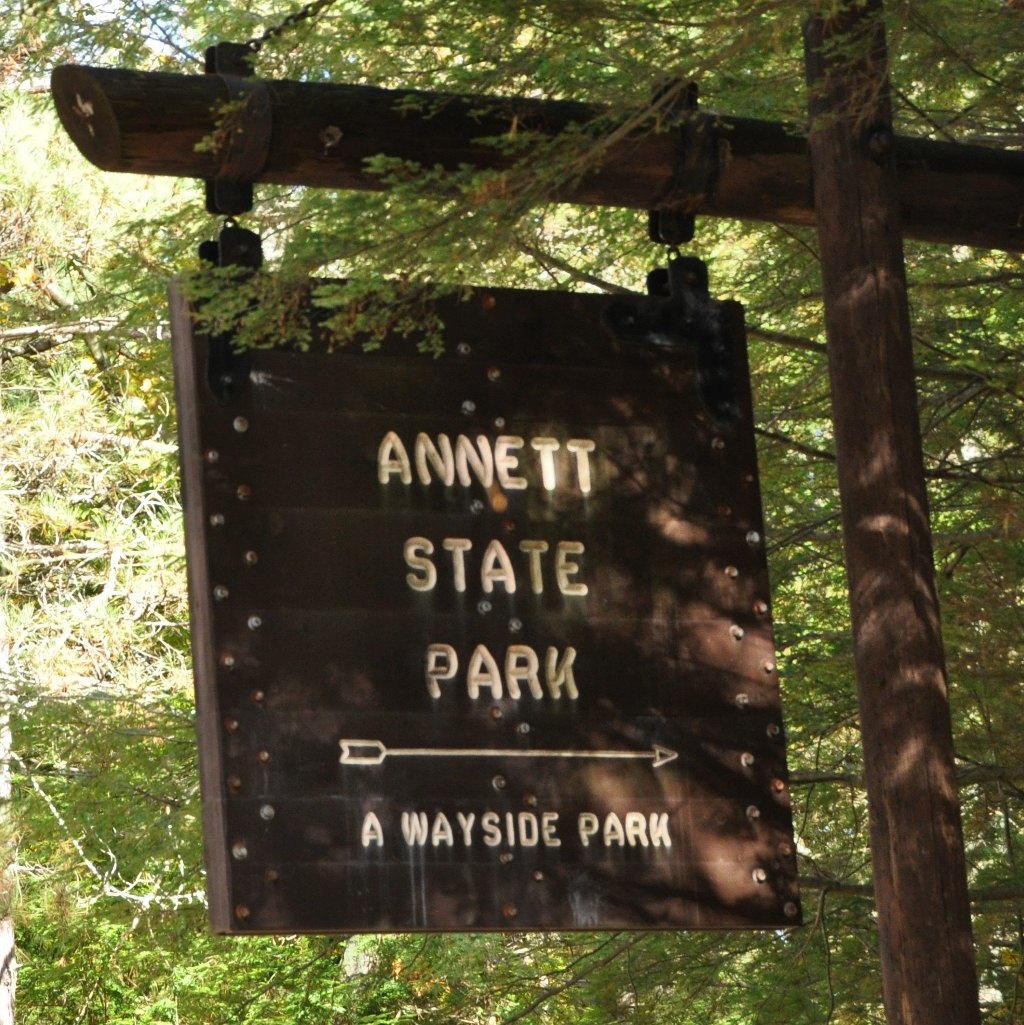
Example of a New Hampshire state park sign, at Annett State Forest

The New Hampshire Division of Parks and Recreation is responsible for the management of state parks within New Hampshire, the Cannon Mountain Ski Area, the Bureau of Trails, the Bureau of Historic Sites, and various community programs. Philip A. Bryce is director of the division. Since 2017, the division's parent agency has been the New Hampshire Department of Natural and Cultural Resources (DNCR).

Projects include study and development of the Temple Mountain Ski Area, acquired by the state in 2007, slated to become a state park.

== See also ==
- List of New Hampshire state parks
