= List of rivers of Connecticut =

Most of Connecticut's rivers flow into Long Island Sound and from there the waters mix into the Atlantic Ocean. A few extremely eastern rivers flow into Block Island Sound. The list is arranged by drainage basin from east to west, with respective tributaries indented from downstream to upstream under each larger stream's name.

== By drainage basin (east to west) ==
=== Block Island Sound ===
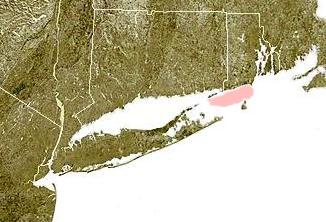
Block Island Sound is shown highlighted in pink, between the coast of the Rhode Island and Block Island.

- Pawcatuck River – easternmost CT river basin
  - Shunock River
  - Ashaway River (Rhode Island)
    - Green Fall River
  - Wood River

=== Long Island Sound ===
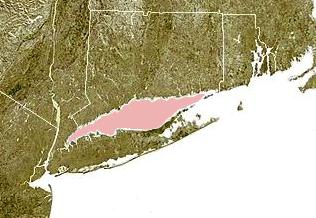
Long Island Sound is shown highlighted in pink between Connecticut and Long Island.

- Mystic River
  - Whitford Brook
  - Pequotsepos River
- Poquonock River
- Thames River
  - Oxoboxo River
  - Shetucket River
    - Quinebaug River
      - Pachaug River
      - Blackwell Brook
      - Moosup River
      - Five Mile River
      - Little River (Quinebaug River tributary)
      - French River
    - Little River (Shetucket River tributary)
    - Merrick Brook
      - Beaver Brook
    - Natchaug River
      - Mount Hope River
        - Fenton River
      - Bigelow Brook
      - Still River (Natchaug River tributary)
    - Willimantic River
      - Tenmile River
      - Hop River
        - Skungamaug River
  - Yantic River
- Niantic River
- Pattagansett River
- Fourmile River
- Threemile River
- Black Hall River

Connecticut River watershed

- Connecticut River
  - Back River
  - Lieutenant River
  - Falls River
  - Eightmile River
  - Deep River
  - Salmon River
    - Moodus River
    - Blackledge River
    - Jeremy River
  - Sumner Brook
    - Pameacha Creek
  - Mattabesset River
    - Coginchaug River
  - Hockanum River
    - Tankerhoosen River
  - Park River – also known as Hog River and Little River
    - North Branch Park River
    - South Branch Park River
  - Podunk River
  - Farmington River
    - Pequabuck River
    - Nepaug River
      - Poland River
    - East Branch Farmington River
      - Hubbard River
    - West Branch Farmington River
      - Still River
        - Mad River
  - Scantic River
    - Watchaug River
- Patchogue River
- Menunketesuck River
- Indian River (Clinton)
- Hammonasset River
- Neck River
- East River
- West River (Guilford)
- Branford River
- Farm River

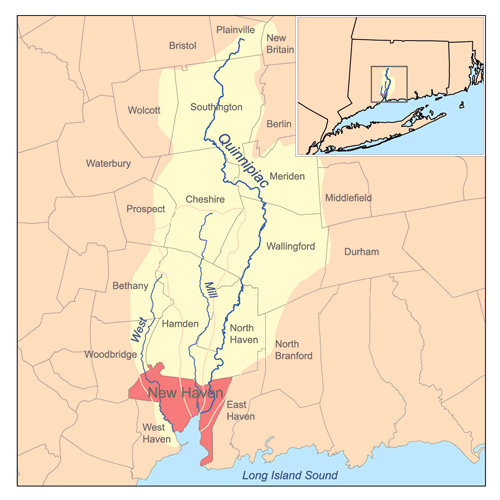
Rivers of New Haven

- Quinnipiac River
  - Muddy River
  - Tenmile River
    - Mountain Brook
  - Eightmile River
- Mill River
- West River
  - Sargent River
- Cove River
- Oyster River
- Indian River (Milford)
- Wepawaug River

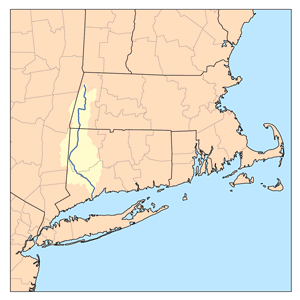
Housatonic River watershed

- Housatonic River
  - Farmill River
  - Naugatuck River
    - Mad River
  - Halfway River
  - Pomperaug River
    - Nonnewaug River
    - Weekeepeemee River
  - Pootatuck River
  - Shepaug River
    - Bantam River
    - Marshepaug River
  - Still River
  - West Aspetuck River
    - East Aspetuck River
  - Rocky River
  - Ten Mile River
  - Hollenbeck River
  - Blackberry River
    - Whiting River
  - Konkapot River
- Pequonnock River
- Ash Creek
  - Rooster River
- Mill River
- Saugatuck River
  - West Branch Saugatuck River
  - Aspetuck River
  - Little River
- Norwalk River
  - Silvermine River

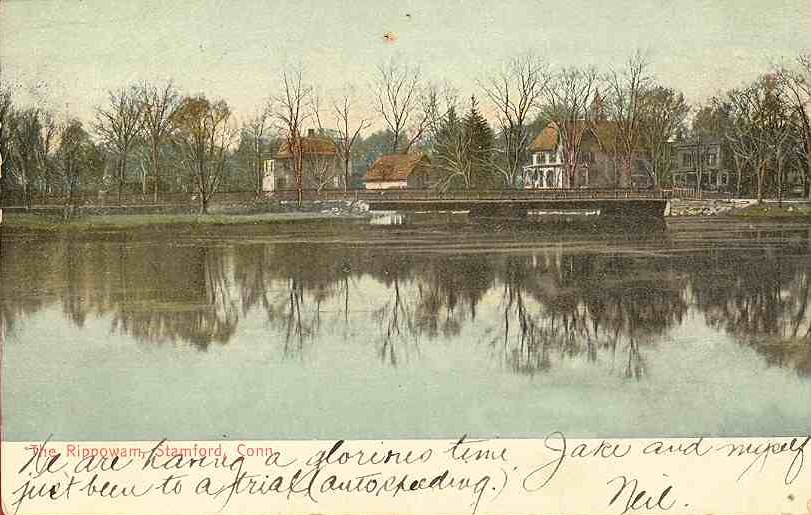
Rippowam River, 1906

- Fivemile River
- Noroton River
- Rippowam River – also known as Mill River in its lower end in Stamford
- Mianus River
- Byram River – Westernmost river basin in Connecticut

=== New York Harbor ===
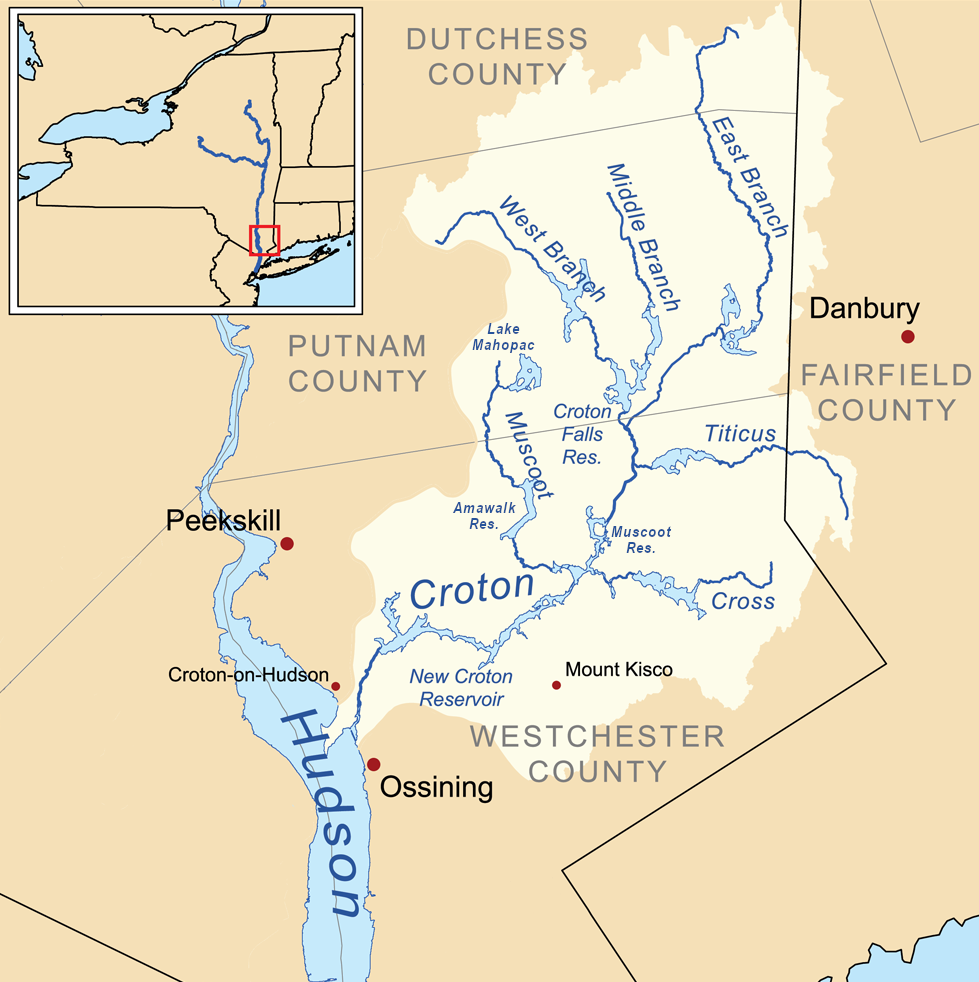
Map of the Croton River drainage basin

- Hudson River (New York)
  - Croton River (New York)
    - Titicus River

== See also ==
- List of rivers in the United States
