= North Stonington Village Historic District =

Historic district in Connecticut, United States

- U.S. National Register of Historic Places
- U.S. Historic district
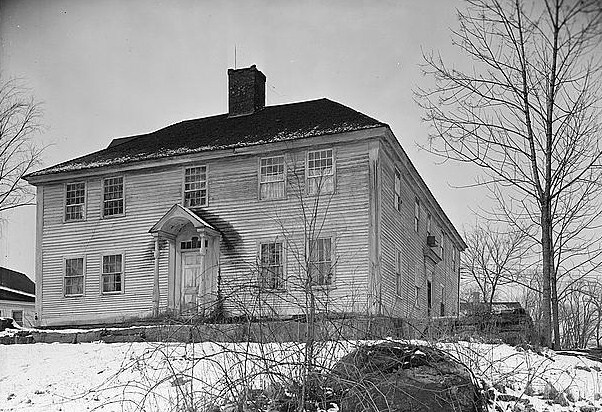
- William Sisson House in 1940

- Location within Connecticut Location within the United States
- Location: CT 2, Main Street, Wyassup, Babcock, Caswell, and Rocky Hollow Roads, North Stonington, Connecticut
- Coordinates: 41°26′26″N 71°52′59″W
- Area: 105 acres (42 ha)
- Architect: Multiple
- Architectural style: Mixed (more than 2 styles from different periods)
- NRHP reference No.: 83001289
- Added to NRHP: March 17, 1983

The North Stonington Village Historic District is a 105-acre (42 ha) historic district encompassing the historic center of the main village of North Stonington, Connecticut. The district includes a well-preserved small industrial village, which flourished in the years before the American Civil War, and declined afterward. The district was listed on the National Register of Historic Places in 1983.

== Description and history ==
North Stonington was settled as part of Stonington in the 17th century, and was separately incorporated in 1807. Its central village grew around an early gristmill site on the Shunock River, and its oldest surviving buildings are houses that date to the mid-18th century. Industry flourished after 1790, with a power canal prodiving water power to a variety of mills, as well as a triphammer and tannery. These were all relatively modest in scale, and suffered competitively with larger scale textile mills developed elsewhere. Business survived through the American Civil War, which placed a heavy demand for woolen products, but declined thereafter. None of the village's 19th-century industrial facilities remain, beyond foundations, industrial archaeological remains, and traces of the water power system.

The historic district is centered on the confluence of Assekonk Brook and the Shunock River, and is roughly bounded on the south and west by the modern alignment of Connecticut Route 2. The district includes 72 contributing buildings, 5 other contributing structures, 3 contributing sites, and 1 contributing object. Most of these buildings are residences built either in the 18th century or in the first half of the 19th, and are in vernacular versions of architectural styles popular at that time. Federal, Greek Revival, and Italianate buildings predominate, although there are a few examples of later styles, particularly in the village's institutional buildings. The current town hall is a converted garage with Colonial Revival styling, while previously the town offices were in an 1809 Federal style commercial building. Probably the most architectural sophisticated building in the district is the Richardsonian Romanesque Wheeler Library, built in the early 20th century.

== Contributing properties ==
Contributing properties having photos included in the 1981 NRHP application are:

- a stone bridge over the Shunok River (photo 1 in the NRHP application attachments)
- lower dam of the Shunok River (photo 2)
- the William Sisson House, at 69 Main Street (photo 3)
- the Luther Avery / Steven Maine House, at 1 Wyassup Road (photo 4)
- the William Avery House, at 35 Main Street (photo 5)
- the Noah Grant, Jr., House, a house with a broken pediment at 17 Main Street (photo 6)
- the Rev. Joseph Ayer House, 94 Main Street (photo 7)
- the Wheeler Store Old Town Hall (photo 8)
- the North Stonington Post Office, 60 Main Street (photo 9)
- the Holmes Block, 2 Wyassup Road (photos 10 and 11)
- the William M. Wheeler House, at 77 Main Street (photo 12)
- the Third Baptist Church, at 29 Main Street (photo 13)
- the North Stonington Congregational Church, at 79 Main Street (photo 14)
- a schoolhouse, at 9 Wyassup Road (photo 15)
- 13 Rocky Hollow Road, a Gothic- and Italianate-style house (photo 16)
- Dudley Stewart House, 32 Main Street, a house with a peak ornament (photo 17)
- carriage house to the Andrew Baldwin House at 63 Main Street (photo 18)
- the Park Hotel, at 6 Wyassup Road (photo 19)
- the Wheeler School and Library, with a hipped roof, 101 Main Street (photo 20)
- the North Stonington Grange, 21 Wyassup (photo 21)
- the Town Garage and Gas Station (photo 22)
- Blacksmith Shop, at 25 Main Street (photo 23)
- remains of canal off Babcock Road, (photo 24)
- historic photo, c.1900, of saw mill (photo 25)
- machinery of lower dam, 1981 (photo 26)

The stone bridge over the Shunok River was damaged in flooding on March 29, 2010.

== See also ==
- National Register of Historic Places listings in New London County, Connecticut
