= Samuel O. Prentice =

American judge

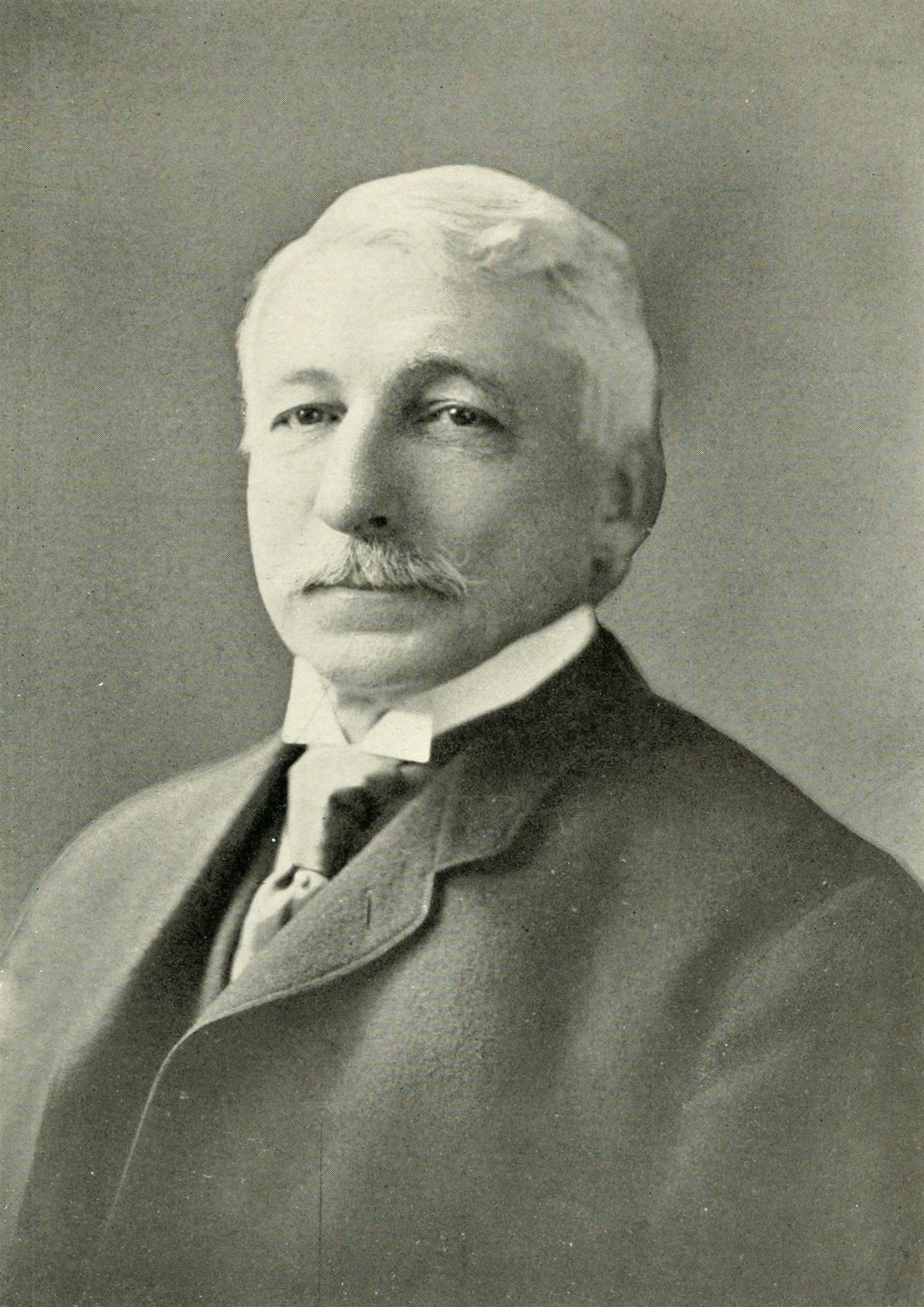
Samuel O. Prentice

Samuel Oscar Prentice (born North Stonington, Connecticut, August 8, 1850; died November 2, 1924) was a lawyer, judge, and chief justice of the Supreme Court of Connecticut.

Prentice attended the Norwich Free Academy 1866-9 and then entered Yale, where he was a member of Skull and Bones, graduating in 1873. He continued on to Yale Law School, graduating in 1875. Prentice was admitted to the bar and began practice, first with the firm of Chamberlain, Hall, & White in Hartford and then in 1876 as the junior partner in Johnson & Prentice. In 1889 he was appointed to the Superior Court by Governor Morgan G. Bulkeley, who had employed him as executive secretary. In 1901 he was appointed to the Connecticut Supreme Court (then called the "Supreme Court of Errors"); he was reappointed in 1909. In February 1913 he was promoted to the position of Chief Justice, a position he held until he reached the judicial retirement age of 70 in 1920.

Prentice was a professor at the Yale Law School from 1901 to 1915. He was involved with many charitable and professional organizations, serving as president of the Hartford Public Library, president of the Watkinson Library, president of the Connecticut Humane Society, and a long-time member of the state bar examining committee.

Prentice married Anne Coombe on April 24, 1901. Mrs. Prentice was a delegate to the Republican National Convention in 1924.
