= Black Hall River =

River in Connecticut, US

Black Hall River is a river in the state of Connecticut, United States of America. It joins the Back River at Great Island in Old Lyme, where they enter Long Island Sound. The river is situated near the mouth of the Connecticut River. It has been described as a scenic river that flows through a marshy rural area that has a large presence of wildlife.

The name Black Hall is derived from Black Hole, a cave which housed a black employee of one Matthew Griswold in 1645.

The Blackhall is one of southern New England's recreational flatwater kayaking rivers.

== See also ==
- List of rivers of Connecticut
