= John Randall House =

Historic house in Connecticut

- U.S. National Register of Historic Places
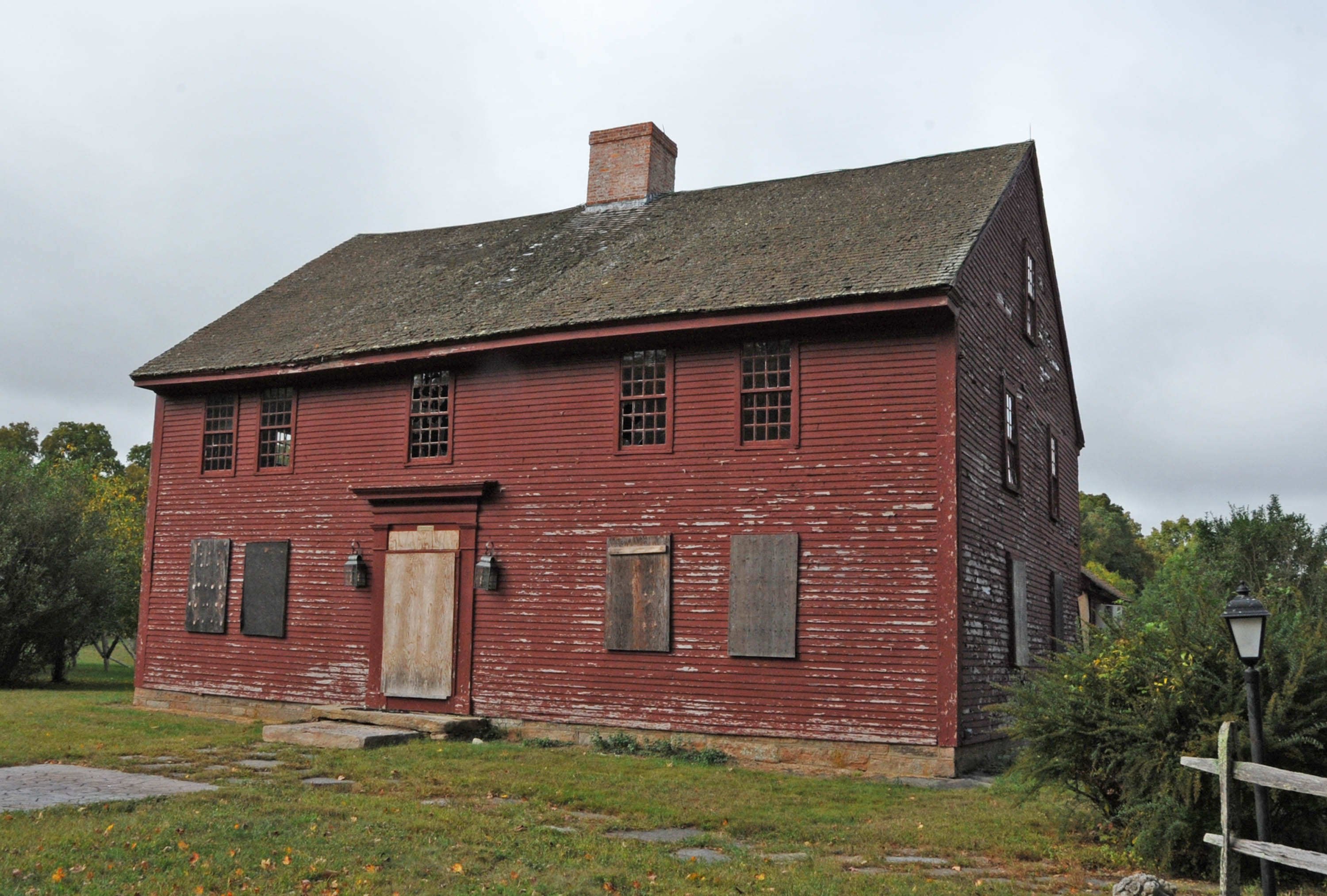

- Location within Connecticut Location within the United States
- Location: Southeast North Stonington on Route 2, North Stonington, Connecticut
- Coordinates: 41°24′59″N 71°51′37″W
- Area: 13.3 acres (5.4 ha)
- Built: 1685-1720
- Architectural style: Georgian
- NRHP reference No.: 78002877
- Added to NRHP: December 1, 1978

The John Randall House is a historic house on Route 2 in North Stonington, Connecticut. Its earliest section dates to 1685, with the main block reaching its present configuration before 1720. The house was restored in the 1930s by early preservationist Norman Isham and listed on the National Register of Historic Places on December 1, 1978.

== Description and history ==
The John Randall House is set on a rural parcel of land down a long lane on the west side of Route 2, about 2,000 feet (610 m) north of its junction with Interstate 95. It is a 2 1/2-story wood-frame structure, five asymmetrical bays wide, with a massive central stone chimney and clapboarded exterior. Its main entrance is framed by pilasters and a corniced entablature. The house is framed with inch-thick planking, a common technique of the period, although the planking was usually thinner, and is suggestive of two distinct periods of construction. The eastern parlor has a large fireplace wall finished in wooden paneling, the fireplace flanked by pilasters. The western parlor has a period built-in cabinet, wainscoting, and original plasterwork. The house was part of a farm named Anguilla Farm by the son of original proprietor John Randall, a husbandman and Sabbatarian from England.

A descendant named Darius Randall lived in the John Randall House. He was an abolitionist and the home was a stop on the Underground Railroad with a trap door in the hearth room that leads to a secret room where slaves were hidden.

Two emancipation releases have been found in the Stonington Town Records signed by William Randall: On March 24, 1808, William Randall “emancipated and made free a Negro man named Jabe Slave being 29 years of age well and healthy.” On March 11, 1807, he freed “Rose, a 26-year-old Negro slave, who was well and healthy.”

== See also ==
- List of the oldest buildings in Connecticut
- National Register of Historic Places listings in New London County, Connecticut
