= Pameacha Creek =

Stream in Middletown, Connecticut, U.S.

Coordinates: 41.5495°N 72.6490°W

Pameacha Creek is a stream in Middletown, Connecticut.

== See also ==
- List of rivers of Connecticut
