= Connecticut River =

River in the New England region, US

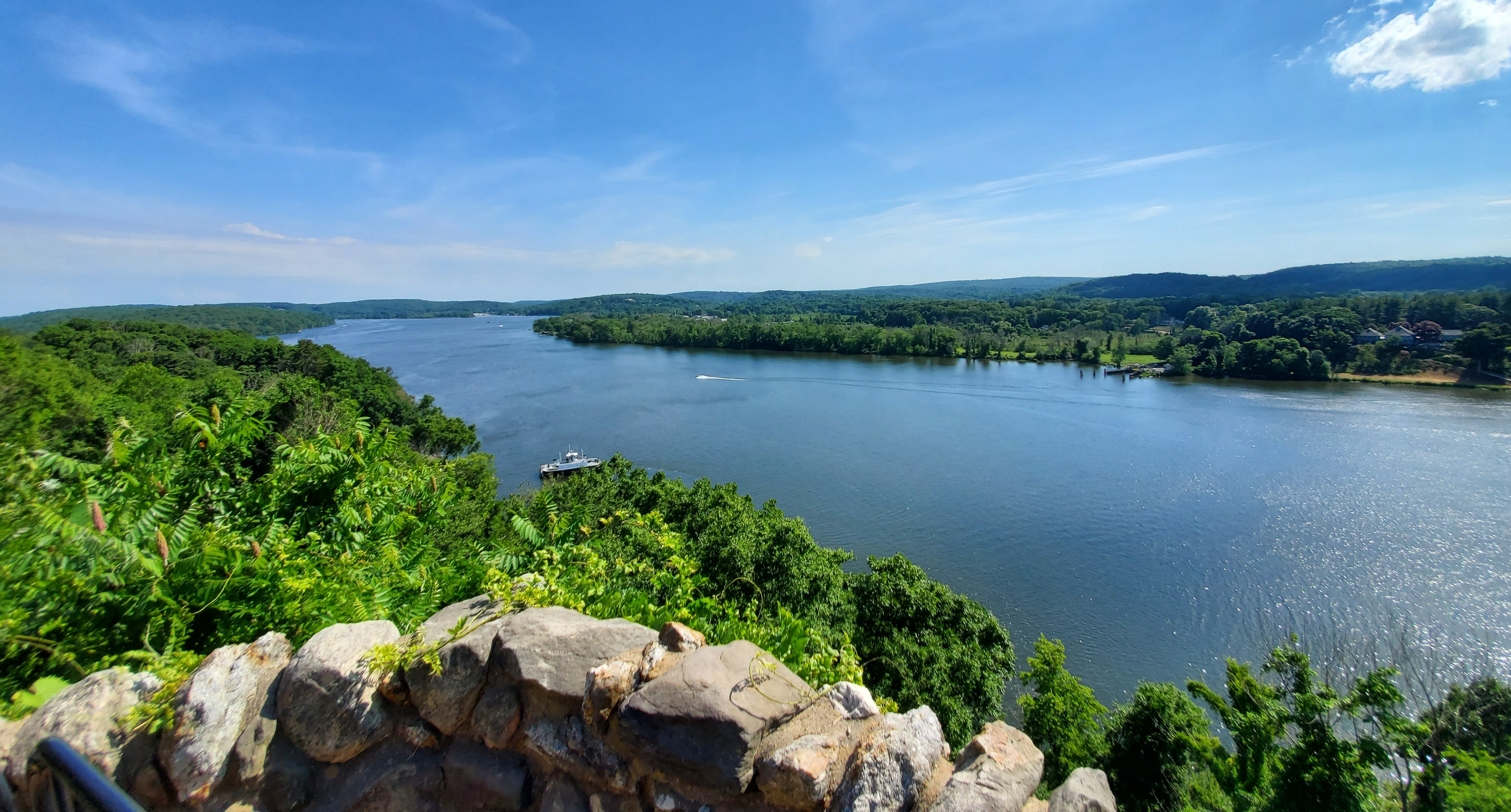
- The Connecticut River seen from behind Gillette Castle in Lyme, Connecticut

- River map, with major tributaries
- Native name: Kwenitegok (Abenaki)

Location
- Country: United States
- Region: New England
- State: Connecticut, Massachusetts, Vermont, New Hampshire
- Cities: Springfield, Massachusetts, Hartford, Connecticut

Physical characteristics
- Source: Fourth Connecticut Lake
  - location: Coos County, New Hampshire, United States
  - coordinates: 45°14′53″N 71°12′51″W
  - elevation: 2,660 ft (810 m)
- Mouth: Long Island Sound
  - location: Old Saybrook and Old Lyme, Connecticut
  - coordinates: 41°16′20″N 72°20′03″W
- Length: 410 mi (660 km)
- Basin size: 11,260 sq mi (29,200 km^{2})
- Discharge
  - location: Thompsonville, Connecticut
  - average: 18,400 cu ft/s (520 m^{3}/s)
  - minimum: 968 cu ft/s (27.4 m^{3}/s)
  - maximum: 282,000 cu ft/s (8,000 m^{3}/s)
- Discharge
  - location: West Lebanon, New Hampshire
  - average: 6,600 cu ft/s (190 m^{3}/s)

Basin features
- Tributaries
  - left: Chicopee River
  - right: White River
- Protection status

Ramsar Wetland
- Official name: Connecticut River Estuary and Tidal River Wetlands Complex
- Designated: October 14, 1994
- Reference no.: 710

The Connecticut River is a major river in the New England region of the United States. The region's longest, it flows roughly southward for 406 miles (653 km) through four states. Rising 300 yards (270 m) south of the U.S. border with Quebec, Canada, it discharges into Long Island Sound between Old Saybrook and Old Lyme, Connecticut. Its watershed encompasses 11,260 square miles (29,200 km^{2}), covering parts of five U.S. states and one Canadian province, composed of 148 tributaries, 38 of which are major rivers. It produces 70% of Long Island Sound's fresh water, discharging at 18,400 cubic feet (520 m^{3}) per second.

The Connecticut River Valley is home to some of the northeastern United States' most productive farmland, as well as the Hartford–Springfield Knowledge Corridor, a metropolitan region of approximately two million people surrounding Springfield, Massachusetts, and Hartford, Connecticut.

== History ==
The word "Connecticut" is a corruption of the Mohegan word quinetucket and Nipmuc word kwinitekw, which mean "beside the long, tidal river". The word came into English usage during the early 1600s to name the river, which was also called simply "The Great River". It was also known by New Netherlanders as Versche Rivier, or the fresh river.

Early spellings of the name by European explorers included "Cannitticutt" in French or in English.

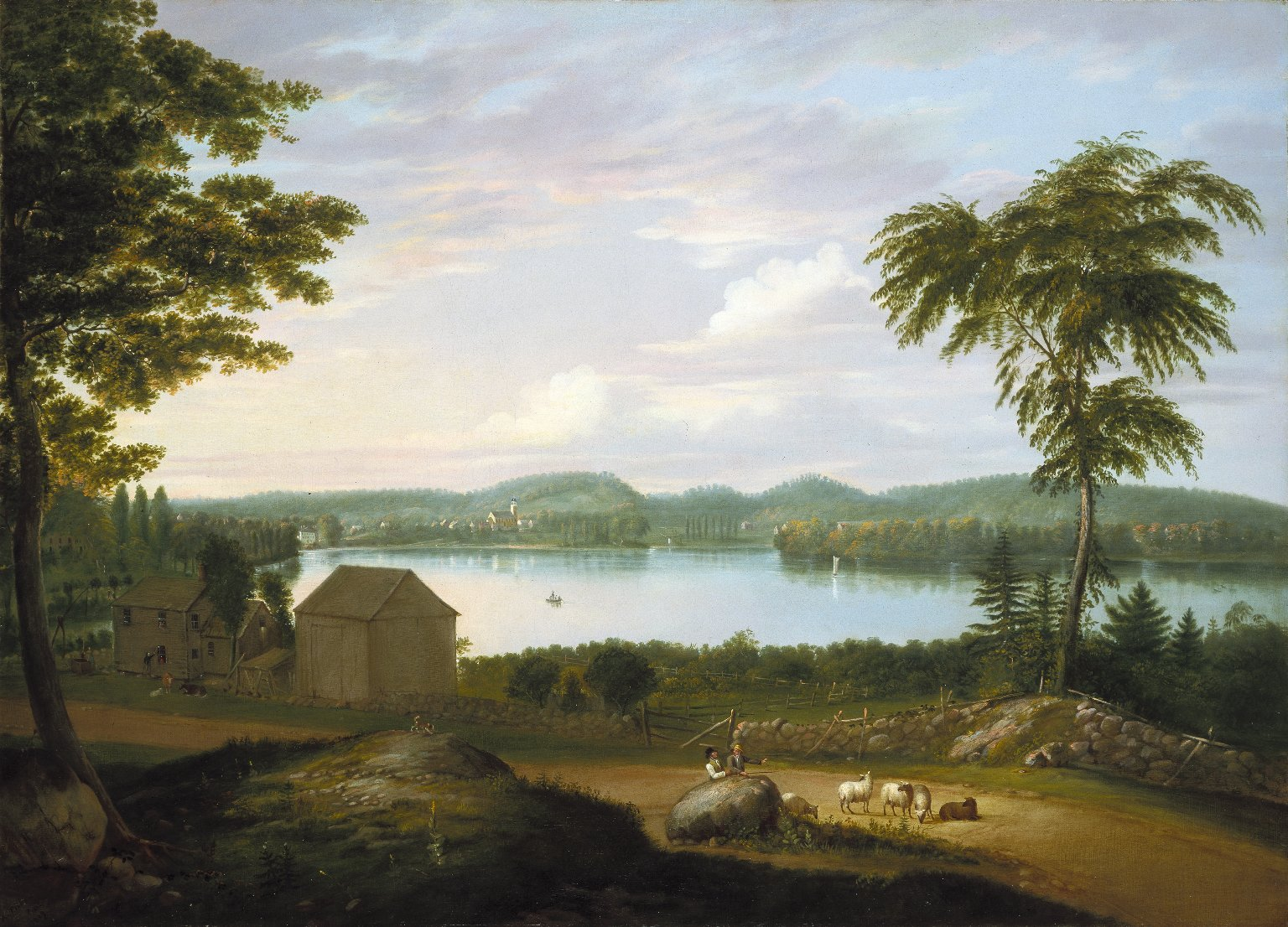
View of Springfield on the Connecticut River by Alvan Fisher (Brooklyn Museum)

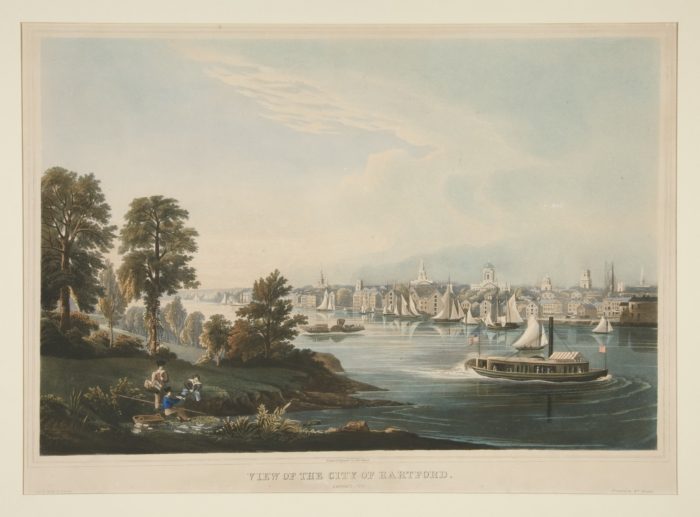
View of the City of Hartford, Connecticut by William Havell

=== Pre-1614: Native American populations ===
Archaeological digs reveal human habitation of the Connecticut River Valley for 6,000 years before present. Numerous tribes lived throughout the fertile Connecticut River valley prior to Dutch exploration beginning in 1614. Information concerning how these tribes lived and interacted stems mostly from English accounts written during the 1630s.

The Pequots dominated a territory in the southern region of the Connecticut River valley, stretching roughly from the river's mouth at Old Saybrook, Connecticut, north to just below the Big Bend at Middletown, Connecticut. They warred with and attempted to subjugate neighboring agricultural tribes such as the Western Niantics, while maintaining an uneasy stand-off with their rivals the Mohegans.

The Mattabesset (Tunxis) tribe takes its name from the place where its sachems ruled at the Connecticut River's Big Bend at Middletown, in a village sandwiched between the territories of the aggressive Pequots to the south and the more peaceable Mohegans to the north.

The Mohegans dominated the region due north, where Hartford and its suburbs sit, particularly after allying themselves with the Colonists against the Pequots during the Pequot War of 1637. Their culture was similar to the Pequots, as they had split off from them and become their rivals some time prior to European exploration of the area.

The agricultural Pocomtuc tribe lived in unfortified villages alongside the Connecticut River north of the Enfield Falls on the fertile stretch of hills and meadows surrounding Springfield, Massachusetts. The Pocomtuc village of Agawam eventually became Springfield, situated on the Bay Path where the Connecticut River meets the western Westfield River and eastern Chicopee River. The Pocomtuc villagers at Agawam helped Puritan explorers settle this site and remained friendly with them for decades, unlike tribes farther north and south along the Connecticut River. The region stretching from Springfield north to the New Hampshire and Vermont state borders fostered many agricultural Pocomtuc and Nipmuc settlements, with its soil enhanced by sedimentary deposits. Occasionally, these villages endured invasions from more aggressive confederated tribes living in New York, such as the Mohawk, Mahican, and Iroquois.

The Pennacook tribe mediated many early disagreements between colonists and other Indian tribes, with a territory stretching roughly from the Massachusetts border with Vermont and New Hampshire, northward to the rise of the White Mountains in New Hampshire. The Western Abenaki (Sokoki) tribe lived in the Green Mountains region of Vermont but wintered as far south as the Northfield, Massachusetts, area. The (Sokoki) tribe migrated to Odanak, Quebec following the epidemics and the wars with the settlers but returned to Vermont.

=== 1614–1636: Dutch and Puritan settlement ===
In 1614, Dutch explorer Adriaen Block became the first European to chart the Connecticut River, sailing as far north as Enfield Rapids. He called it the "Fresh River" and claimed it for the Netherlands as the northeastern border of the New Netherland Colony. In 1623, Dutch traders constructed a fortified trading post at the site of Hartford, Connecticut, called the Fort Huys de Hoop ("Fort House of Hope").

Four separate Puritan-led groups also settled the fertile Connecticut River Valley, and they founded the two large cities that continue to dominate the Valley: Hartford (est. 1635) and Springfield (est. 1636). The first group of pioneers left the Plymouth Colony in 1632 and ultimately founded the village of Matianuck (which became Windsor, Connecticut) several miles north of the Dutch fort. A group left the Massachusetts Bay Colony from Watertown, seeking a site where they could practice their religion more freely. With this in mind, they founded Wethersfield, Connecticut, in 1633, several miles south of the Dutch fort at Hartford.

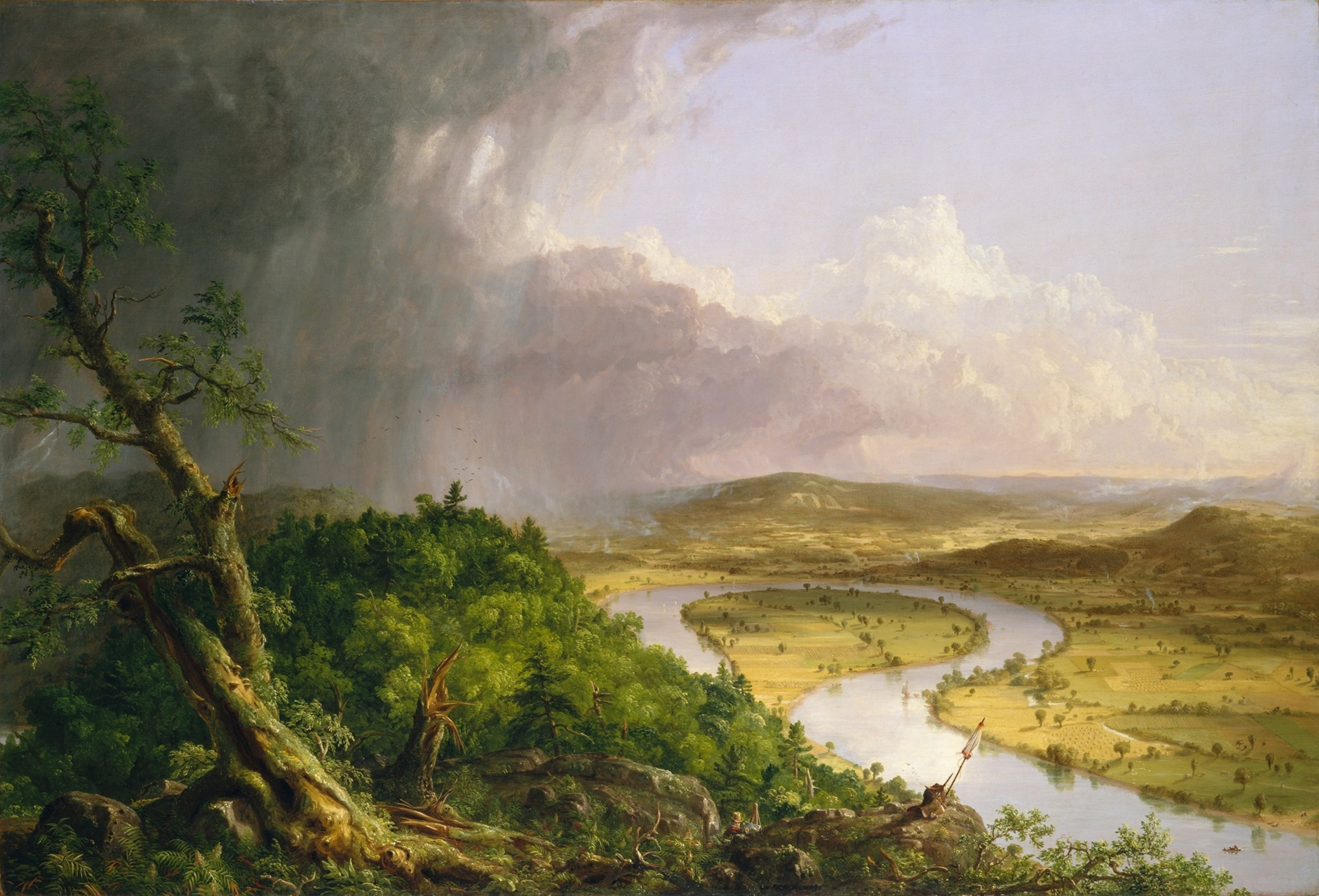
View from Mount Holyoke, Northampton, Massachusetts, after a Thunderstorm—The Oxbow (1836) by Thomas Cole

In 1635, Reverend Thomas Hooker led settlers from Cambridge, Massachusetts, where he had feuded with Reverend John Cotton, to the site in Connecticut of the Dutch Fort House of Hope, where he founded Newtowne. Shortly after Hooker's arrival, Newtowne annexed Matianuck based on laws articulated in Connecticut's settlement charter, the Warwick Patent of 1631. The patent, however, had been physically lost, and the annexation was almost certainly illegal.

The fourth English settlement along the Connecticut River came out of a 1635 scouting party commissioned by William Pynchon to found a city on the river's most advantageous site for commerce and agriculture. Pynchon's Massachusetts scouts located the Pocomtuc village of Agawam, where the Bay Path trade route crossed the Connecticut River at two of its major tributaries—the Chicopee River to the east and the Westfield River to the west—and just north of Enfield Falls, the river's first unnavigable waterfall. Pynchon surmised that traders using any of these routes would have to dock and change vessels at his site, thereby granting the settlement a commercial advantage. It was initially named Agawam Plantation and was allied with the settlements to the south that became the state of Connecticut. In 1641, Springfield splintered off from the Hartford-based Connecticut Colony, allying itself with the Massachusetts Bay Colony. For decades, Springfield remained the Massachusetts Bay Colony's westernmost settlement, on the northern border of the Connecticut Colony.

Of these settlements, Hartford and Springfield quickly emerged as powers. By 1654, however, the success of these English settlements rendered the Dutch position untenable on the Connecticut River. A treaty moved the boundary westward between the Connecticut Colony and the New Netherland Colony to a point near Greenwich. The treaty allowed the Dutch to maintain their trading post at Fort Huys de Hoop, which they did until the 1664 British takeover of New Netherland.

=== Border disputes ===
The Connecticut River Valley's central location, fertile soil, and abundant natural resources made it the target of centuries of border disputes, beginning with Springfield's defection from the Connecticut Colony in 1641, which brought the Massachusetts Bay Colony to the river. In 1640, the Massachusetts Bay Colony asserted jurisdiction over lands surrounding the river; however, Springfield remained politically independent until tensions with the Connecticut Colony were exacerbated by a final confrontation later that year.

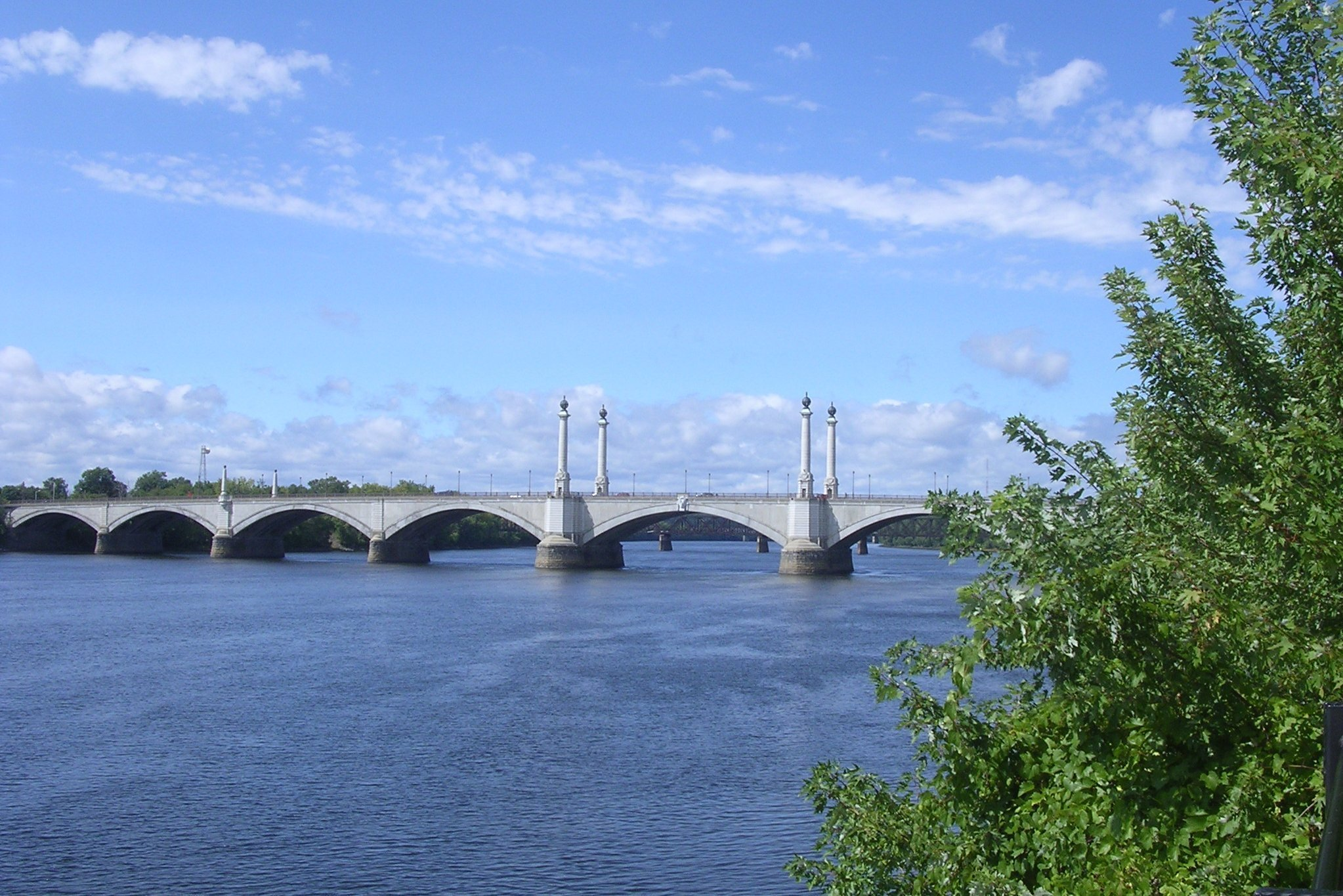
The Memorial Bridge across the Connecticut River at Springfield, Massachusetts, the river's largest city

Hartford kept a fort at the mouth of the Connecticut River at Old Saybrook for protection against the Pequot, Wampanoag, Mohegans, and the New Netherland Colony. After Springfield broke ties with the Colony, the remaining Connecticut settlements demanded that Springfield's ships pay tolls when passing the mouth of the river. The ships refused to pay this tax without representation at Connecticut's fort, but Hartford refused to grant it. In response, the Massachusetts Bay Colony solidified its friendship with Springfield by levying a toll on Connecticut Colony ships entering Boston Harbor. Connecticut was largely dependent on sea trade with Boston and therefore permanently dropped its tax on Springfield, but Springfield allied with Boston nonetheless, drawing the first state border across the Connecticut River.

The Fort at Number 4 in Charlestown, New Hampshire, was the northernmost British colonial presence on the Connecticut River until the end of the French and Indian War in 1763. The Abenaki had resisted British colonial settlement for decades, but colonists began settling north of Brattleboro, Vermont, following the war. Settlement of the Upper Connecticut River Valley increased quickly, with population assessments of 36,000 by 1790.

Vermont was claimed by both New Hampshire and New York, and was settled primarily through the issuance of land grants by New Hampshire Governor Benning Wentworth beginning in the 1740s. New York protested these grants, and the Board of Trade decided in 1764 that the border between the provinces should be the western bank of the Connecticut River. Ethan Allen, the Green Mountain Boys, and other residents of the disputed area resisted attempts by New York to exercise authority there, which resulted in the establishment of the independent Vermont Republic in 1777 and its eventual accession to the United States in 1791 as the fourteenth state. Boundary disputes between Vermont and New Hampshire lasted for nearly 150 years. They were finally settled in 1933, when the U.S. Supreme Court reaffirmed King George's boundary as the ordinary low-water mark on the Vermont shore. In some places, the state line was inundated by the impoundments of dams built after this time.

=== The Treaty of Paris and the 19th century ===
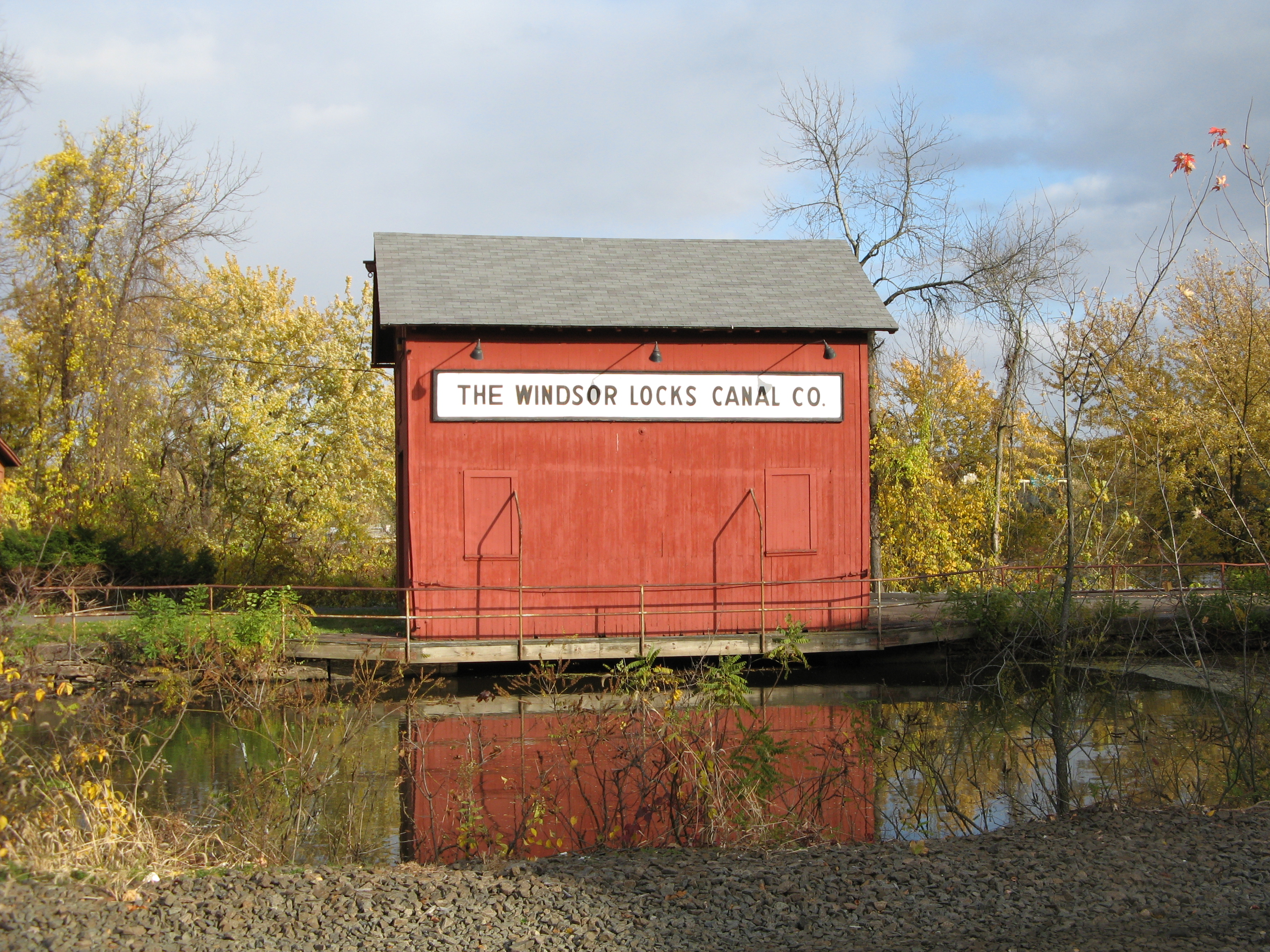
The Windsor Locks Canal Company at Enfield Falls, the Connecticut River's first major barrier to navigation

The Treaty of Paris (1783) that ended the American Revolutionary War created a new international border between New Hampshire and the Province of Canada at the "northwesternmost headwaters of the Connecticut". Several streams fit this description, leading to a boundary dispute that resulted in the short-lived Indian Stream Republic, which existed from 1832 to 1835.

The broad, fertile Connecticut River Valley attracted agricultural settlers and colonial traders to Hartford, Springfield, and the surrounding region. The high volume and numerous falls of the river capable of powering mills and waterwheels led to the rise of industry along its banks during the Industrial Revolution. The cities of Springfield and Hartford, in particular, became centers of innovation and "intense and concentrated prosperity."

The Enfield Falls Canal was opened in 1829 to circumvent shallows around Enfield Falls, and the locks built for this canal gave their name to the town of Windsor Locks, Connecticut. The Connecticut River Valley functioned as America's hub of technical innovation into the 20th century, particularly the cities of Springfield and Hartford, and thus attracted numerous railroad lines. The proliferation of the railroads in Springfield and Hartford greatly decreased the economic importance of the Connecticut River. Except for log drives that persisted into the early decades of the 20th century, the river has functioned largely as a center of wildlife and recreation since the late 1800s.

=== Log drives and the early 20th century ===
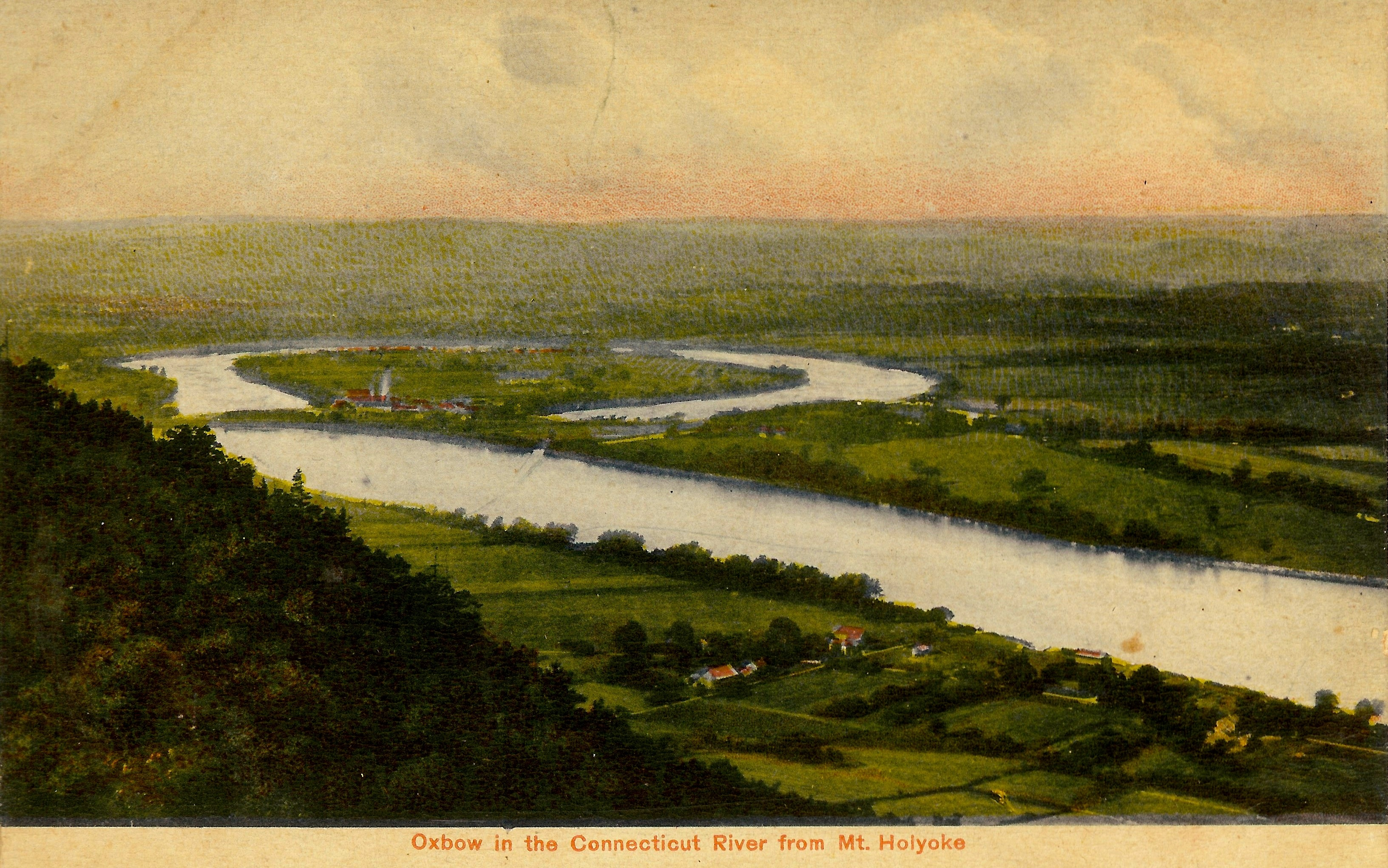
The Oxbow, Connecticut River, at Northampton, Massachusetts c. 1910

Starting about 1865, the river was used for massive logging drives from Third Connecticut Lake to initially water powered sawmills near Enfield Falls. Trees cut adjacent to tributary streams including Perry Stream and Indian Stream in Pittsburg, New Hampshire, Halls Stream on the Quebec–New Hampshire border, Simms Stream, the Mohawk River of New Hampshire, and the Nulhegan River basin in Essex County, Vermont, would be flushed into the main river by the release of water impounded behind splash dams. Several log drivers died trying to move logs through Perry Falls in Pittsburg. Teams of men would wait at Canaan, Vermont to protect the bridges from logjams. Men guided logs through a 400-foot (120 m) drop along the length of Fifteen-Mile Falls (later submerged under Moore and Comerford reservoirs), and through Logan's Rips at Fitzdale, Mulligan's Lower Pitch, and Seven Islands. The White River from Vermont and the Ammonoosuc River from New Hampshire brought more logs into the Connecticut. A log boom was built between Wells River, Vermont, and Woodsville, New Hampshire, to hold the logs briefly and release them gradually to avoid jams in the Ox Bow section of river just downstream in Haverhill. Men detailed to this work utilized Woodsville's saloons and red-light district. Some of the logs were destined for mills in Wilder and Bellows Falls, Vermont, while others were sluiced over the Bellows Falls dam. North Walpole, New Hampshire, contained twelve to eighteen saloons, patronized by the log drivers. Mount Tom was the landmark the log drivers used to gauge the distance to the final mills near Holyoke, Massachusetts. These spring drives were stopped after 1915, when pleasure boat owners complained about the hazards to navigation. A final drive in 1918 conducted to meet World War I pulp demand consisted of 100,000 cords of four-foot logs controlled by 500 workers, representing 65 million feet of logs.

=== The flood of 1936 ===
In March 1936, a combination of heavy winter snowfall, an early spring thaw, and torrential rains caused the Connecticut River to overflow its banks. Flooding destroyed numerous bridges and isolated hundreds of people who had to be rescued by boat.

The dam at Vernon, Vermont, was topped by 19 feet (5.8 m). Sandbagging by the National Guard and local volunteers helped prevent the dam's powerhouse from being overwhelmed, despite ice blocks breaking through the upstream walls.

In Northampton, Massachusetts, looting during the flood became a problem, prompting the mayor to deputize citizen patrols to protect flooded areas. Over 3,000 refugees from the area were housed in Amherst College and the Massachusetts State Agricultural College (today the University of Massachusetts, Amherst).

Unprecedented ice jams compounded the problems created by the flood, diverting water into unusual channels and damming the river, further raising water levels. When the jam at Hadley, Massachusetts, gave way, the water crest overflowed the dam at Holyoke, overwhelming the sandbagging there. The village of South Hadley Falls was essentially destroyed, and the southern parts of Holyoke were severely damaged, with 500 refugees.

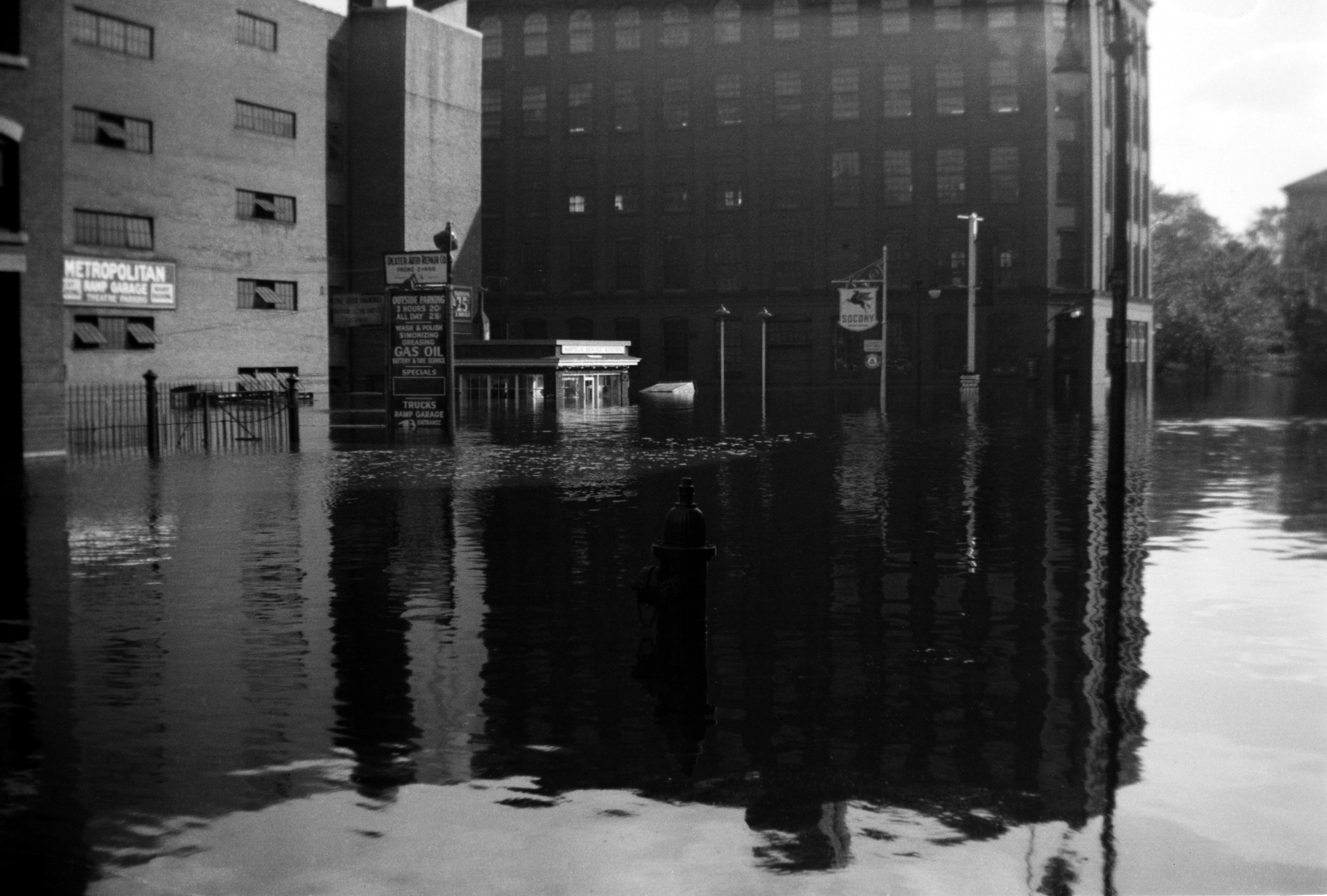
Downtown Hartford, Connecticut, during the 1936 flood

In Springfield, Massachusetts, 5 sq mi (13 km^{2}), and 18 miles (29 km) of streets were flooded, and 20,000 people lost their homes. The city lost power, and nighttime looting caused the police to issue a "shoot on sight" edict; 800 National Guard troops were brought in to help maintain order. Rescue efforts using a flotilla of boats saved people trapped in upper stories of buildings, bringing them to local fraternal lodges, schools, churches, and monasteries for lodging, medical care, and food. The American Red Cross and local, state, and federal agencies, including the WPA and the CCC, contributed aid and workforce to the effort. Flooding of roads isolated the city for a time. When the water receded, it left behind silt-caused mud, which in places was 3 feet (1 m) thick; the recovery effort in Springfield, at the height of the American Great Depression, took approximately a decade.

Overall, the flood caused 171 deaths and US$500 million (US$11,600,000,000 with inflation) in damages. Across the northeast, over 430,000 people were made homeless or destitute by flooding that year.

The Connecticut River Flood Control Compact between the states of Connecticut, Massachusetts, New Hampshire, and Vermont was established in 1953 to help prevent serious flooding.

=== 1936–present: Water supply ===
The creation of the Quabbin Reservoir in the 1930s diverted the Swift River, which feeds the Chicopee River, a tributary of the Connecticut. This resulted in an unsuccessful lawsuit by the state of Connecticut against the diversion of its riparian waters.

Demand for drinking water in eastern Massachusetts passed the sustainable supply from the existing system in 1969. Diverting water from the Connecticut River was considered several times, but in 1986 the Massachusetts Water Resources Authority instead undertook a campaign of water conservation. Demand was reduced to sustainable levels by 1989, reaching approximately a 25% margin of safety by 2009.

== Course ==
The Connecticut River is the largest river ecosystem in New England. Its watershed spans Connecticut, Massachusetts, New Hampshire, Vermont, small portions of Maine, and the Canadian province of Quebec.

=== The Upper Connecticut River: New Hampshire and Vermont ===
The Connecticut Lakes, the source of the Connecticut River, near the border of New Hampshire and Quebec

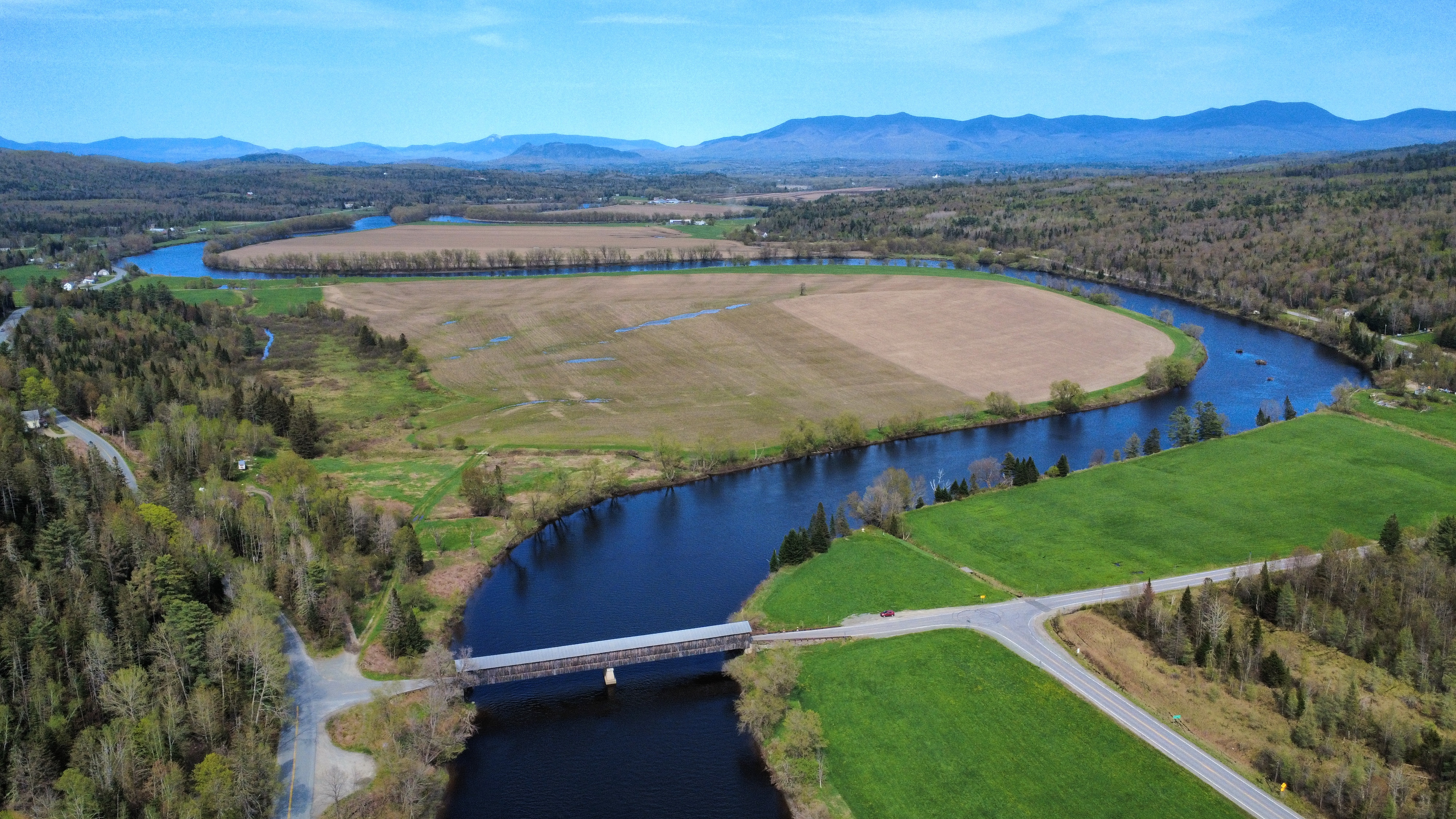
The upper Connecticut River Valley near Lancaster, New Hampshire, with Mount Orne Covered Bridge visible at bottom

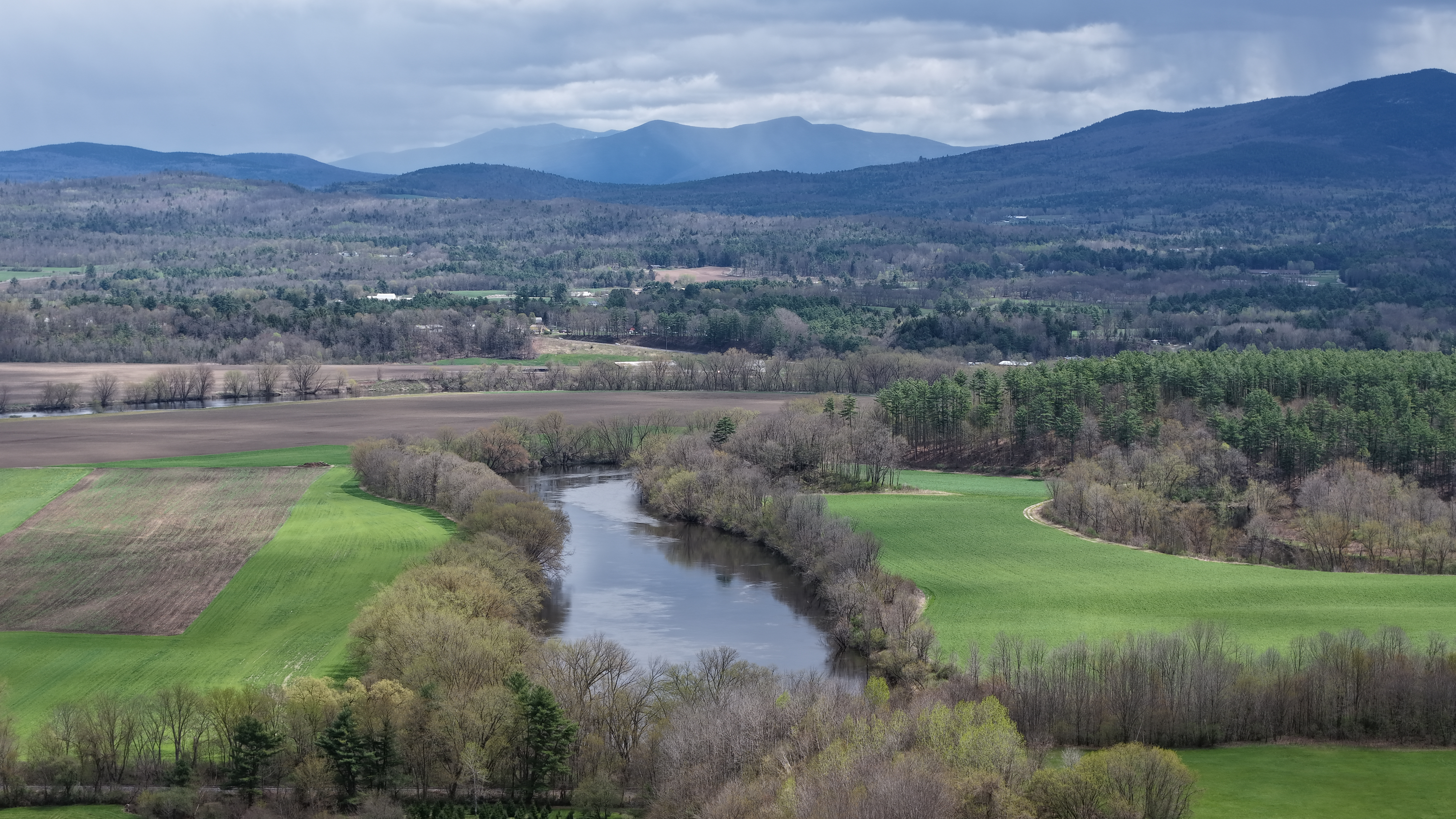
The Connecticut River from Newbury, Vermont, with Kinsman Mountain and Mount Lafayette visible in the distance

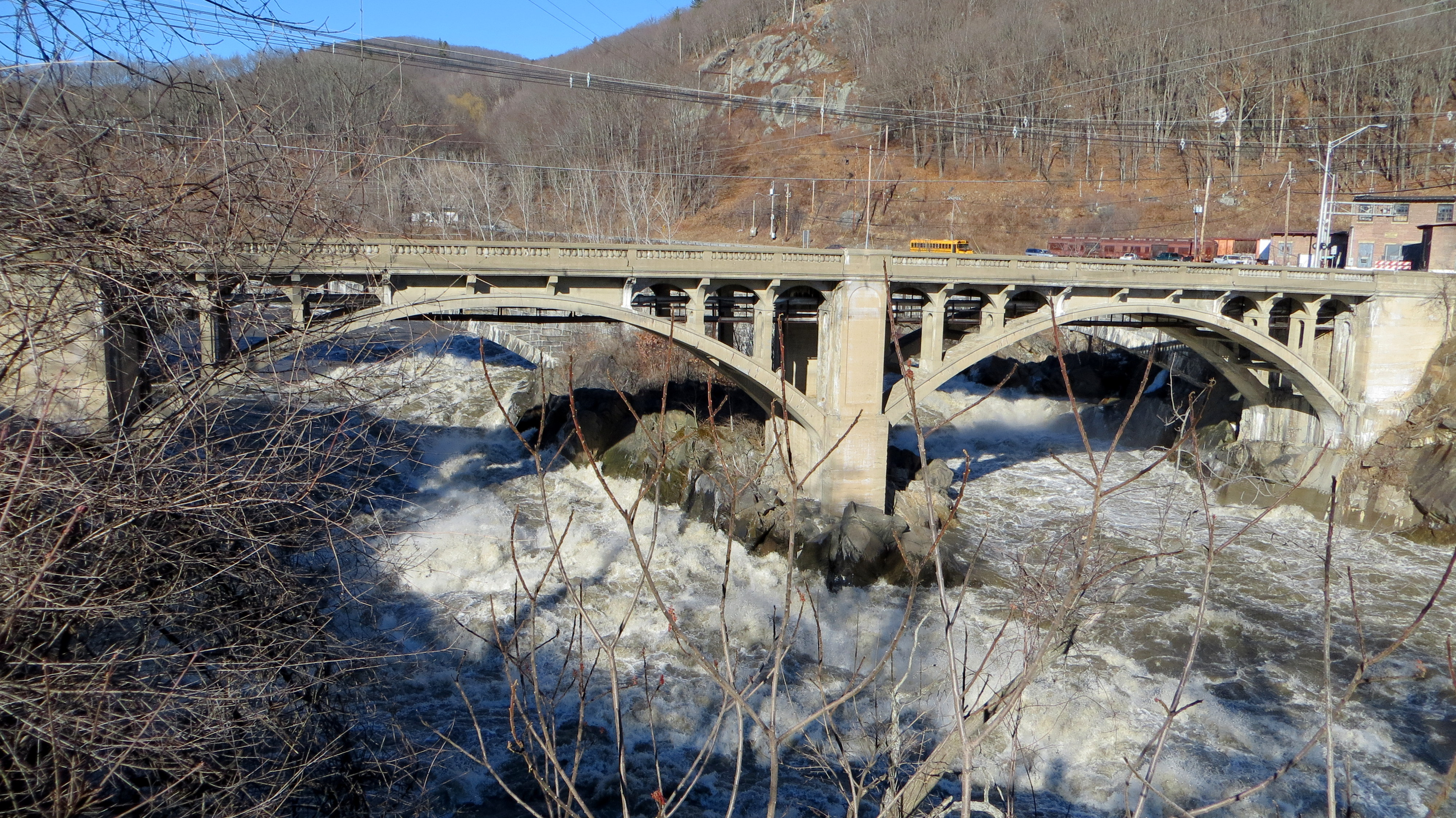
Great Falls (Bellows Falls) at high flow under the Vilas Bridge, taken from the end of Bridge Street on the Vermont side, looking upriver

The Connecticut River rises from Fourth Connecticut Lake, a small pond 300 yards (270 m) south of the Canada–United States border in the town of Pittsburg, New Hampshire, at an elevation of 2,670 feet (810 m) above sea level. It flows through the remaining Connecticut Lakes and Lake Francis for 14 miles (23 km), all within the town of Pittsburg, and then widens as it delineates 255 miles (410 km) of the border between New Hampshire and Vermont. The river drops more than 2,480 feet (760 m) in elevation as it winds south to the border of Massachusetts where it sits 190 feet (58 m) above sea level.

The region along the river upstream and downstream from Lebanon, New Hampshire, and White River Junction, Vermont, is known as the "Upper Valley". The exact definition of the region varies, but it is generally considered to extend south to Windsor, Vermont, and Cornish, New Hampshire, and north to Bradford, Vermont, and Piermont, New Hampshire. In 2001, the Trust for Public Land purchased 171,000 acres (690 km^{2}) of land in New Hampshire from International Paper, allowing the Connecticut Lakes Headwaters Partnership Task Force to plan the future protection of the land. The property spans the towns of Pittsburg, Clarksville, and Stewartstown, New Hampshire, nearly 3 percent of the land in the state of New Hampshire. The Trust for Public Land worked in partnership with the Society for the Protection of New Hampshire Forests, The Nature Conservancy of New Hampshire, and others to raise around $42 million. A conservation easement over 146,000 acres (590 km^{2}) of the property prohibits development of the land while allowing public access. The forest is managed by the Lyme Timber Company, and the conservation easement over the land ensures sustainable forest management of the property.

=== The Middle Connecticut River: Massachusetts through central Connecticut ===
Following the most recent ice age, the Middle Connecticut River Valley sat at the bottom of Lake Hitchcock. Its lush greenery and rich, almost rockless soil come from the ancient lake's sedimentary deposits. In the Middle Connecticut region, the river reaches its maximum depth – 130 feet (40 m) – at Gill, Massachusetts, around the French King Bridge, and its maximum width – 2,100 feet (640 m) – at Longmeadow, directly across from the Six Flags New England amusement park. The Connecticut's largest falls – South Hadley Falls – features a vertical drop of 58 feet (18 m). Lush green forests and agricultural hamlets dot this middle portion of the Connecticut River; however, the region is best known for its numerous college towns, such as Northampton, South Hadley, and Amherst, as well as the river's most populous city, Springfield. The city sits atop bluffs beside the Connecticut's confluence with two major tributaries, the Chicopee River to the east and Westfield River to the west. The region around the Connecticut River is known locally as the Pioneer Valley, and the name adorns many local civic organizations and local businesses. While the southern part of the valley in Massachusetts is heavily urbanized, the northern section is largely rural, and the local agriculture is well known for Connecticut shade tobacco.

The tides influence the Connecticut River as far north as Enfield Rapids in Windsor Locks, Connecticut, approximately 58 miles (93 km) north of the river's mouth. Two million residents live in the densely populated Hartford-Springfield region, which stretches roughly between the college towns of Amherst, Massachusetts, and Middletown, Connecticut. Hartford, the second-largest city and the only state capital on the river, is at the southern end of this region on an ancient floodplain that stretches to Middletown.

=== The Lower Connecticut River: Southern Connecticut to Long Island Sound ===
15 miles (24 km) south of Hartford, at Middletown, the Lower Connecticut River section begins with a narrowing of the river, and then a sharp turn southeast. Throughout southern Connecticut, the Connecticut passes through a thinly populated, hilly, wooded region before again widening and discharging into Long Island Sound between Old Saybrook and Old Lyme in flat coastal marshlands. Due to the presence of large, shifting sandbars at its mouth, the Connecticut is the only major river in the Northeastern United States without a port at its mouth.

==== Mouth and tidelands ====
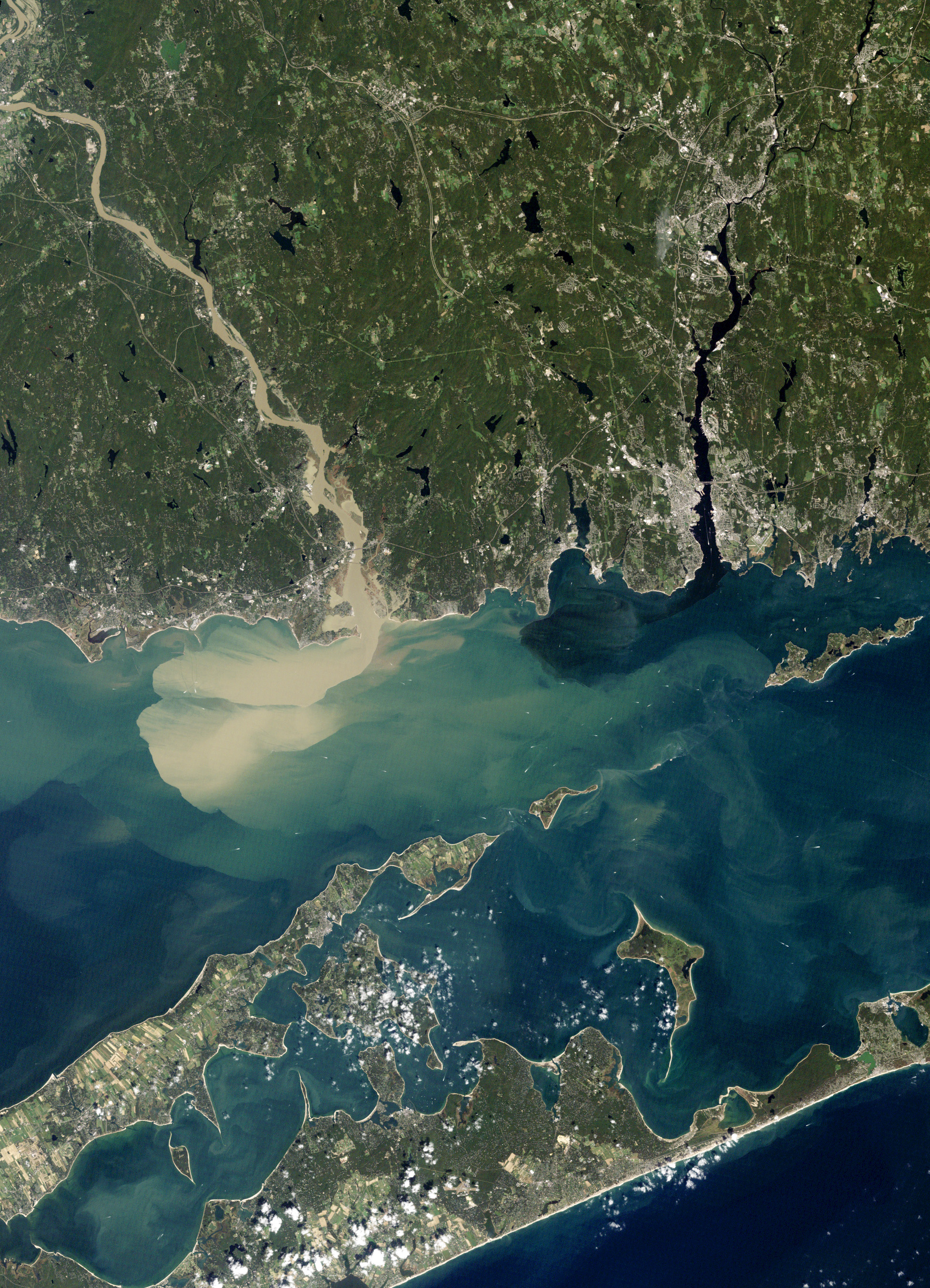
Satellite image of the Connecticut River depositing silt into Long Island Sound

The Connecticut River carries a heavy load of silt from as far north as Quebec, especially during spring snowmelt. This results in a large sandbar near the river's mouth, which is a formidable obstacle to navigation. The Connecticut is one of the few major rivers in the United States without a major city at its mouth because of this obstacle. Major cities on the Connecticut River are Hartford and Springfield, which lie 45 and 69 miles (70 and 110 km) upriver of each other.

The Nature Conservancy named the Connecticut River's tidelands one of the Western Hemisphere's "40 Last Great Places", while the Ramsar Convention on Wetlands listed its estuary and tidal wetlands as one of 1,759 wetlands of international importance. In 1997, the Connecticut River was designated one of only 14 American Heritage Rivers, which recognized its "distinctive natural, economic, agricultural, scenic, historic, cultural, and recreational qualities." In May 2012, the Connecticut River was designated America's first National Blueway in recognition of the restoration and preservation efforts on the river.

=== Dams ===
The Connecticut River's flow is slowed by main stem dams, which create a series of slow-flowing basins from Lake Francis Dam in Pittsburg, New Hampshire, to the Holyoke Dam at South Hadley Falls in Massachusetts. Among the most extensively dammed rivers in the United States, the Connecticut may soon flow at a more natural pace, according to scientists at the University of Massachusetts at Amherst, who have devised a computer that – "in an effort to balance human and natural needs" – coordinates the holding and releasing of water between the river's 54 largest dams. The Cabot and Turners Falls hydroelectric stations generate up to 68 MW. The Holyoke Canal System and Hadley Falls Station at Holyoke Dam are rated a combined 48 MW.

=== Tributaries ===
The Connecticut River watershed encompasses 11,260 square miles (29,200 km^{2}) and connects 148 tributaries, including 38 major rivers and numerous lakes and ponds. Major tributaries include (from north to south) the Passumpsic, Ammonoosuc, White, Black, West, Ashuelot, Millers, Deerfield, Chicopee, Westfield, and Farmington rivers. The Swift River, a tributary of the Chicopee, has been dammed and largely replaced by the Quabbin Reservoir which provides water to the Massachusetts Water Resources Authority district in eastern Massachusetts, including Boston and its metropolitan area.

== Ecology ==
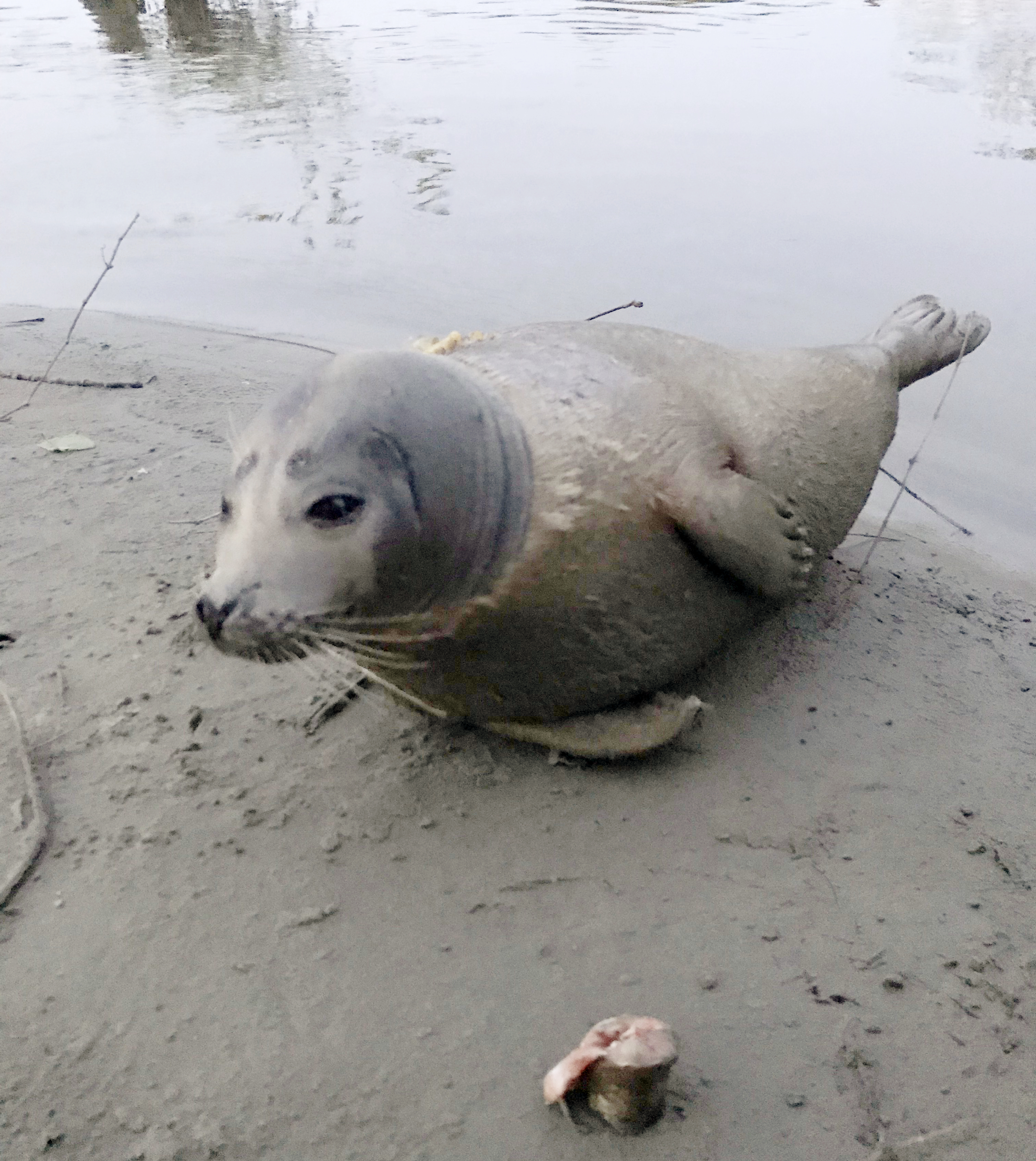
Harbor seal in the Connecticut River, below the Holyoke Dam, following the shad run

Along its southern reaches, the Connecticut River has carved a wide, fertile floodplain valley (known in Massachusetts as the Pioneer Valley), depositing rich silt and loam soils known internationally for their agricultural merit. Abundant riparian hardwood species include sycamores, cottonwood, basswood, willows, sassafras, box elder, black elder, osier dogwood, and more. The river itself and its many tributaries are home to many typical New England freshwater species. These include dace, crawfish, hellgramites, freshwater mussels, typical frog species, snapping turtles, brook trout, freshwater sturgeon, catfish, walleye, chain pickerel, and carp. Introduced species include stocked rainbow trout. The river is an important conduit of many anadromous fish, such as American shad, lamprey, and Atlantic salmon. American eels are also present, as are predators of these migratory fish, including striped bass. Shad run as far north as Holyoke, Massachusetts, where they are lifted over the Holyoke Dam by a fish elevator. This station publishes annual statistics of the run and has recorded an occasional salmon. They pass an additional elevator in Turners Falls, Massachusetts, and make it at least as far as Bellows Falls, Vermont. Harbor seals have been recorded traveling upriver as far north as Holyoke in pursuit of migratory fish; it is possible that they ranged farther upstream before the dam was built. In the southernmost portions of southern Connecticut near Long Island Sound, dolphins are spotted on occasion.

There are 12 species of freshwater mussels. Eleven of them occur in the mainstem of the Connecticut; the brook floater is found only in small streams and rivers. Species diversity is higher in the southern part of the watershed (Connecticut and Massachusetts) than in the northern part (Vermont and New Hampshire), largely due to differences in stream gradient and substrate. Eight of the 12 species in the watershed are listed as endangered, threatened, or of special concern in one or more of the watershed's states.

Many colonial animal species make their home in the waters of the Connecticut. Deeper areas are habitats for a diversity of colonial organisms, including bryozoa. Freshwater sponges the size of dinner plates have been found by scuba divers at depths of more than 130 feet (40 m), thought to be the deepest location of the river, around the French King Bridge in Erving, Massachusetts. Mussels, eels, and northern pike were also observed there.

=== Fish ===
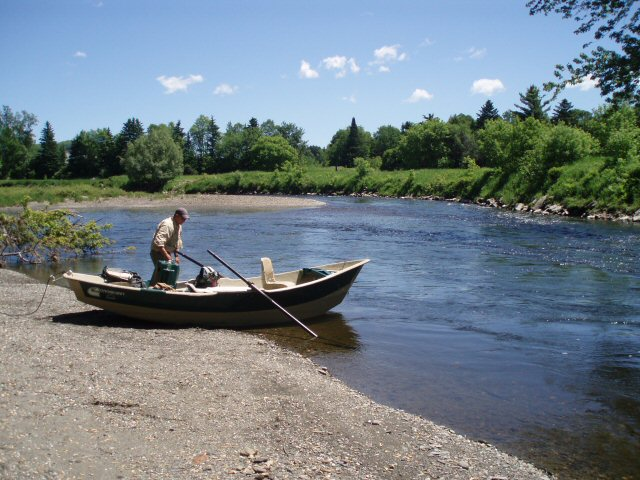
Drift boat fishing guide working the river near Colebrook, New Hampshire

There are several species of anadromous and catadromous fish, including brook trout, winter flounder, blueback herring, alewife, rainbow trout, large brown trout, American shad (Alosa sapidissima), hickory shad, smallmouth bass, Atlantic sturgeon, striped bass (Morone saxatilis), American eel, sea lamprey, and endangered shortnose sturgeon and dwarf wedgemussels. Additionally, the United States Fish and Wildlife Service has repopulated the river with another species of migratory fish, the Atlantic salmon, which for more than 200 years had been extinct from the river due to damming. Several fish ladders and fish elevators have been built to allow fish to resume their natural migration upriver each spring.

Fresh and brackish water residents of the main branch and tributaries include common carp, white catfish, brown bullhead, fallfish, yellow perch, smallmouth bass, largemouth bass, northern pike, chain pickerel, bluegill, pumpkinseed sunfish, golden shiner, and rock bass.

Much of the beginning of the river's course in the town of Pittsburg is occupied by the Connecticut Lakes, which contain lake trout and landlocked salmon. Landlocked salmon make their way into the river during spring spawning runs of bait fish and during their fall spawn. The river has fly-fishing-only regulations on 5 miles (8 km) of river. Most of the river from Lake Francis south is open to both lures and bait. Two tailwater dams provide cold river water for miles downstream, making for bountiful summer fishing on the Connecticut.

After the first major dam was built near Turners Falls, Massachusetts, thirteen additional dams have ended the Connecticut River's great anadromous fish runs. Salmon restoration efforts began in 1967, and fish ladders at a fish elevator at Hadley Falls have since enabled migrating fish to return to some of their former spawning grounds. In addition to dams, warm water discharges between 1978 and 1992 from Vermont Yankee Nuclear Power Plant in Vernon, Vermont, released water up to 105 °F (41 °C) degrees, with the thermal plume reaching 55 miles (89 km) downstream as far as Holyoke. This thermal pollution appears to be associated with an 80% decline in American shad fish numbers from 1992 to 2005 at Holyoke Dam. This decline may have been exacerbated by over-fishing in the mid-Atlantic and predation from resurging striped bass populations. The nuclear plant was closed at the end of 2014, after which the shad population has increased.

== Economy ==
=== Boating ===
The mouth of the river up to Essex is thought to be one of the busiest stretches of waterway in Connecticut. Some local police departments and the state Environmental Conservation Police patrol the area a few times a week. Some towns keep boats available if needed. In Massachusetts, the most active stretch of the Connecticut River is centered on the Oxbow, 14 miles (23 km) north of Springfield in the college town of Northampton.

Camping is available along much of the river, for non-motorized boats, via the Connecticut River Paddlers' Trail. The Paddlers' Trail currently includes campsites on over 300 miles (480 km) of the river.

=== Pollution and cleanup ===
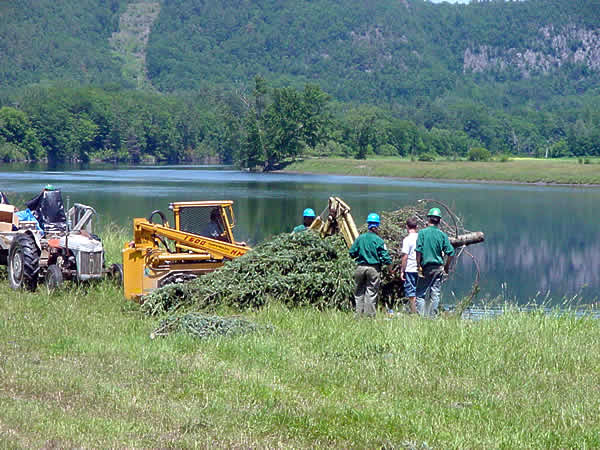
Riverbank restoration project in Fairlee, Vermont

The Water Quality Act of 1965 had a major impact on controlling water pollution in the Connecticut River and its tributaries.

Since then, the river has been restored from Class D to Class B (fishable and swimmable). Many towns along the Lower Connecticut River have enacted a cap on further development along the banks, so that no buildings may be constructed except on existing foundations. Currently, a website provides water quality reports twice a week, indicating whether various portions of the river are safe for swimming, boating, and fishing.

== Lists ==
=== Tributaries ===
Listed from south to north by location of mouth:

- Black Hall River (Old Lyme, CT)
- Falls River (Essex, CT)
- Eightmile River (Hamburg, CT)
- Deep River (Deep River, CT)
- Salmon River (Moodus, CT)
- Mattabesset River (Middletown, CT)
- Hockanum River (East Hartford and Hartford, CT)
- Park River (Hartford, CT)
- Farmington River (Windsor, CT)
- Scantic River (South Windsor, CT)
- Westfield River (West Springfield and Springfield, MA)
- Mill River (Springfield, MA)
- Chicopee River (Chicopee and Springfield, MA)
- Manhan River (The Oxbow of Northampton, MA)
- Mill River (Northampton, MA)
- Fort River (Hadley, MA)
- Mill River (Hatfield, MA)
- Mill River (Amherst, MA)
- Sawmill River (Montague, MA)
- Deerfield River (Deerfield and Greenfield, MA)
- Fall River (Greenfield and Gill, MA)
- Millers River (Millers Falls, MA)
- Ashuelot River (Hinsdale, NH)
- Whetstone Brook (Brattleboro, VT)
- West River (Brattleboro, VT)
- Partridge Brook (Westmoreland, NH)
- Cold River (Walpole, NH)
- Saxtons River (Westminster, VT)
- Williams River (Rockingham, VT)
- Black River (Springfield, VT)
- Little Sugar River (Charlestown, NH)
- Sugar River (Claremont, NH)
- Blow-me-down Brook (Cornish, NH)
- Ottauquechee River (Hartland, VT)
- Mascoma River (West Lebanon, NH)
- White River (White River Junction, VT)
- Mink Brook (Hanover, NH)
- Ompompanoosuc River (Norwich, VT)
- Waits River (Bradford, VT)
- Oliverian Brook (Haverhill, NH)
- Wells River (Wells River, VT)
- Ammonoosuc River (Woodsville, NH)
- Stevens River (Barnet, VT)
- Passumpsic River (Barnet, VT)
- Johns River (Dalton, NH)
- Israel River (Lancaster, NH)
- Upper Ammonoosuc River (Northumberland, NH)
- Paul Stream (Brunswick, VT)
- Nulhegan River (Bloomfield, VT)
- Simms Stream (Columbia, NH)
- Mohawk River (Colebrook, NH)
- Halls Stream (Beecher Falls, VT)
- Indian Stream (Pittsburg, NH)
- Perry Stream (Pittsburg, NH)

=== Crossings ===
The Connecticut River is a barrier to travel between western and eastern New England. Several major transportation corridors cross the river including Amtrak's Northeast Corridor, Interstate 95 (Connecticut Turnpike), Interstate 90 (Massachusetts Turnpike), Interstate 89, Interstate 93, and Interstate 84. In addition, Interstate 91, whose route largely follows the river, crosses it twice – once in Connecticut and once in Massachusetts.

=== In literature ===
Lydia Sigourney's poem "Connecticut River" was first published in her 1834 poetry collection. A later poem, "Passage up the Connecticut", was published in 1845, together with a description of a journey along the river.

Wallace Stevens, one of America's most important 20th-century poets, lived in Hartford, Connecticut, where he was vice-president of the Hartford Insurance Co. He composed many of his poems, including "The River of Rivers in Connecticut", on his 2.4-mile daily walk to and from his office.

== See also ==
- Equivalent Lands
- The Great Attack, the burning of American ships on the Connecticut River at Essex in 1814
- History of Connecticut
- Lake Connecticut, post-glacial predecessor to Lake Hitchcock
- Lake Hitchcock, post-glacial predecessor to the Connecticut River
- List of rivers of Connecticut
- List of rivers of Massachusetts
- List of rivers of New Hampshire
- List of rivers of Vermont
