= North Stonington, Connecticut =

- Town
- Town of North Stonington
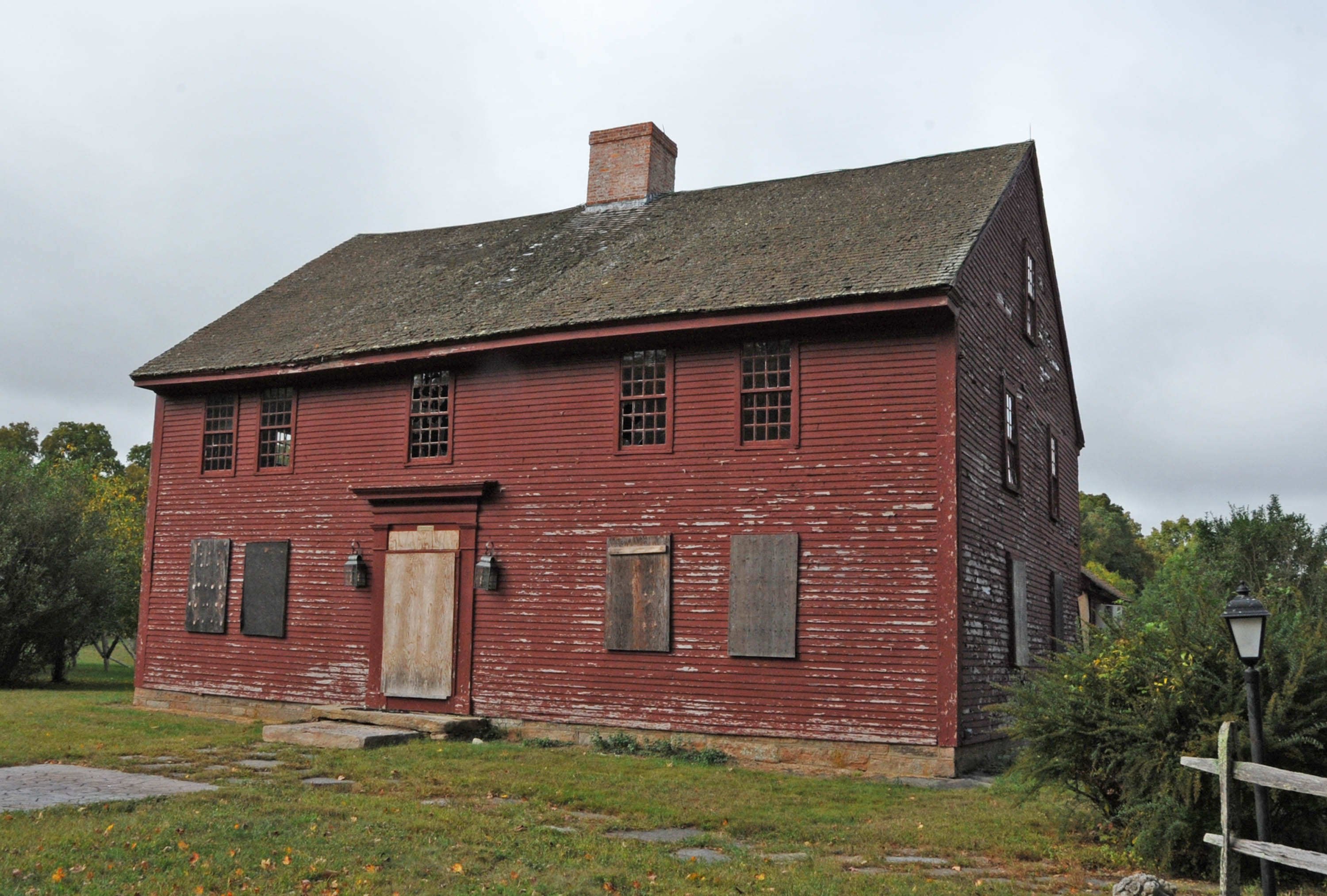
- John Randall House, built in 1690

- Seal

- Coordinates: 41°28′N 71°52′W
- Country: United States
- U.S. state: Connecticut
- County: New London
- Region: Southeastern CT
- Incorporated: 1807

Government
  - Type: Selectman-town meeting
  - First selectman: Robert Carlson (R)
  - Selectman: Brett Mastroianni (R)
  - Selectman: Nichole Porter (D)

Area
  - Total: 55.0 sq mi (142.4 km^{2})
  - Land: 54.3 sq mi (140.7 km^{2})
  - Water: 0.66 sq mi (1.7 km^{2})
- Elevation: 384 ft (117 m)

Population (2020)
  - Total: 5,149
  - Density: 94.78/sq mi (36.60/km^{2})
- Time zone: UTC−5 (Eastern)
  - Summer (DST): UTC−4 (Eastern)
- ZIP Code: 06359
- Area codes: 860/959
- FIPS code: 09-55500
- GNIS feature ID: 0213480
- Website: www.northstoningtonct.gov

North Stonington is a town in New London County, Connecticut. The town was split off from Stonington in 1724. The town is part of the Southeastern Connecticut Planning Region. The population was 5,149 at the 2020 census.

== Geography ==
According to the United States Census Bureau, the town has a total area of 55.0 square miles (142 km^{2}), of which 54.3 square miles (141 km^{2}) is land and 0.7 square miles (1.8 km^{2}), or 1.20%, is water. The town is bordered by Voluntown and Griswold to the north, Preston to the northwest, Ledyard to the southwest, Stonington to the south, Westerly, Rhode Island to the southeast, and Hopkinton, Rhode Island to the east.

=== Principal communities ===
- Clarks Falls
- Laurel Glen
- North Stonington Village
- Route 49

== On the National Register of Historic Places ==
- John Randall House – southeast of North Stonington on Route 2 (added 1978)
- North Stonington Village Historic District – Route 2, Main Street, Wyassup, Babcock, Caswell, and Rocky Hollow Roads (added April 17, 1983)
- Samuel Miner House – north of North Stonington off Route 2 on Hewitt Road (added July 18, 1976)

== Town history ==
=== Before the mid-17th century ===
The land of North Stonington is located at the southeast corner of the state of Connecticut. Until the 17th century, the Pequots, the Niantics, and the Narragansetts were the residents in this area of southeastern Connecticut and adjacent parts of Rhode Island. Little is known about Native American activities in North Stonington prior to English colonization in the area.

The Pequots' imprint remained in the town, however. The first white settlers kept a number of their names for the town's main geological features, including the town's main water course of Shunock Brook, as well as Assekonk Swamp and Wintechog and Cossaduck hills. Colonial authorities eventually allotted two reservations to the Pequot tribe, including a plot of land on the eastern bank of Long Pond adjacent to Lantern Hill in the southwestern corner of the town, established in 1683.

=== Colonial era and Revolutionary War: 1670s–1770s ===
For much of the 17th century, North Stonington was thinly populated by the Pequots and European settlers. Starting in the 1630s and 1640s, the English established coastline settlements in Wequetequock, which is now Old Mystic, and Pawcatuck. However, the pressure of a growing population and continued immigration in succeeding decades caused homesteading to steadily push northward. The end of hostilities following King Philip's War of 1676 and a partial resolution of border disputes among Connecticut, Rhode Island, and Massachusetts colonies also encouraged enterprising pioneers to move inland to stake claims.

The first settlers to North Stonington were Ezekiel Main and Jeremiah Burch in 1667, who established settlements in the areas which became the village of North Stonington and Clark's Falls, respectively. Main was formerly of Massachusetts; he had served in King Philip's War and received a land grant in return for his military service. Burch had been a blacksmith in England before making the crossing to America and establishing a land stake. Other pioneers soon followed; families arrived during the 1670s and 1680s who formed the backbone of the town. They were the Mains, Miners, Wheelers, Browns, Palmers, Hewitts, and Averys, to name a few. Among those were John Swan and his family in 1707, for whom Swantown Road is named.

For most of the 18th century, the town's inhabitants focused on carving out homesteads and farms from virgin forests. This was a slow, generations-long process, as pioneers girdled massive, centuries-old trees until they rotted and fell to the ground, and then began the difficult work of clearing ground and moving boulders. Roads began to be forged through the receding wilderness, beyond just cattle paths and old Pequot trails. Colonial surveyors in 1753 marked out the future route of the Pawcatuck-Voluntown Road (today known as Route 49). One of those who worked on this project was 16-year-old Silas Deane, who later represented Connecticut during the First and Second Continental Congress and served briefly as one of the United States' first diplomats in France. In 1768, a weekly stagecoach was opened between Norwich, Connecticut and Providence, Rhode Island via North Stonington and Pawcatuck; this road became the Norwich-Westerly Road, today known as Route 2.

The reluctance of settlers to walk the great distance every Sunday to the Road Church in Stonington led to the establishment of a northern Congregational society in 1717, in which the northern part of Stonington aimed to build its own meeting house. This "North Society" defined a boundary line that is identical to the border today between North Stonington and Stonington, although disagreements lasted until 1723 concerning this line and the location of the northern meeting house, requiring the colonial assembly's intervention several times. In 1724, North Stonington gained its name by decree of the Connecticut Assembly. A church was finally erected in 1727 located on a knoll at the junction of Wyassup and Reutemann roads. It gained a permanent minister in 1731, when the Rev. Joseph Fish arrived, newly ordained from Harvard; he served until his death at 76 in 1781. This meeting house stood for about a century and became known as the "Black Church", perhaps because its board walls were never painted and became dark with age.

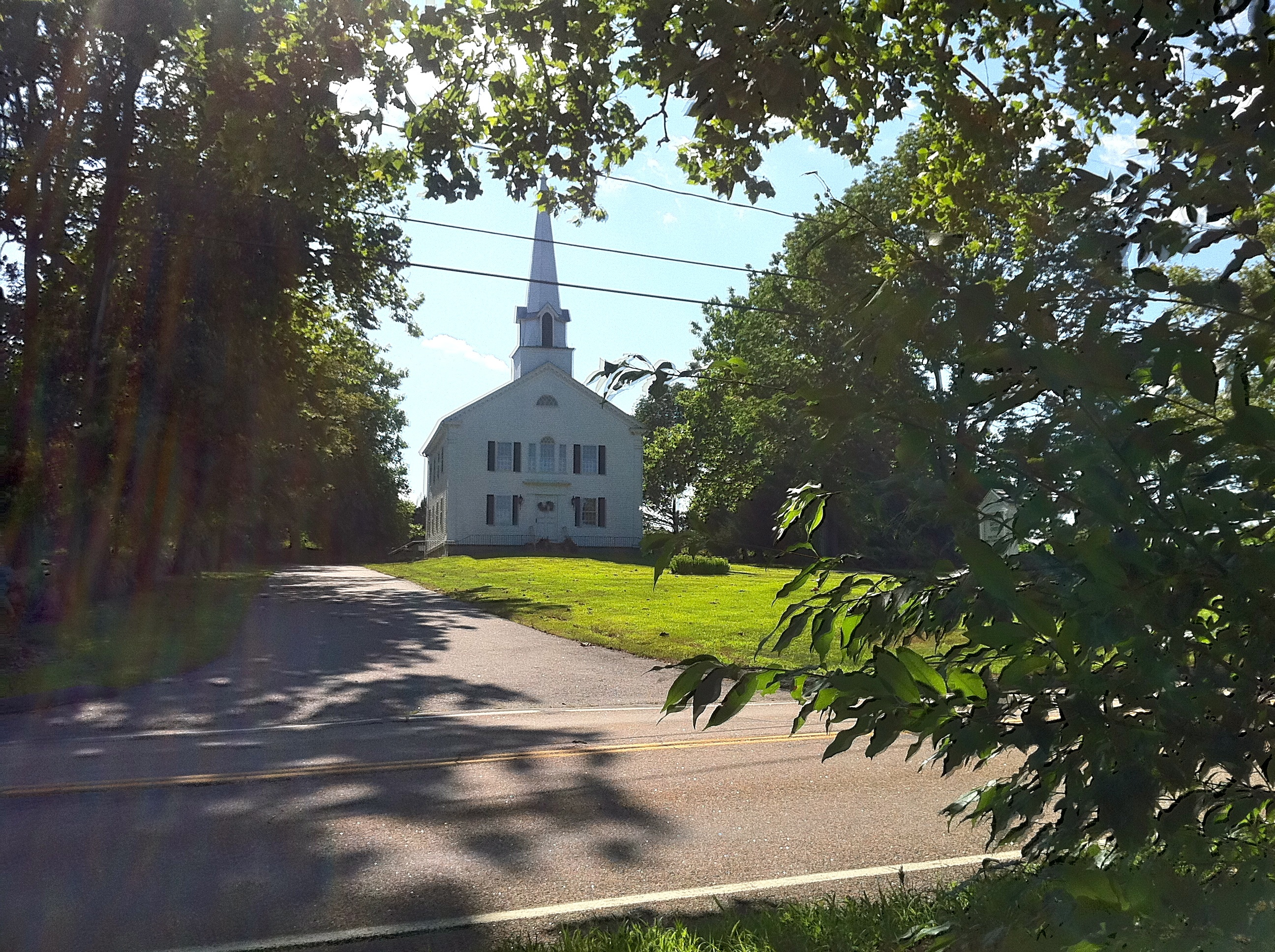
First Baptist Church on Pendleton Hill in 2011

The Great Awakening swept through the American colonies in the early- to mid-1740s. One of the main results of this revivalist movement was the rapid growth of the Baptist Church in America, and North Stonington became a bastion of this denomination in Connecticut. Much of the congregation for this church came from Rev. Fish's flock, and the new Baptists established their own meeting house in 1743. This was the first Baptist church for both Stonington and North Stonington. The original building sat a couple miles south of the 1830 church atop Pendleton Hill on land donated by Luther Palmer in the town's northeastern corner. A stone marker is at the site of the original church.

Turmoil within Rev. Fish's congregation culminated in the departure of another group that formed a "Strict Congregationalist Church" in 1746 more than a mile west of the Village. This schism was deeply traumatic for the Rev. Fish, who later wrote that the "order of families as well as of churches and religious families, is vilely broke, dissolved and lost… the reins of government are thrown upon the neck, and nothing but anarchy and confusion reigns." During 1817–1827, the Congregationalist and Strict Congregationalist churches reunited and built a common church, which is the current location of the town's Congregational Church.

The establishment of the other two Baptist churches was considerably less dramatic. The Rev. Waite Palmer organized the Second Baptist Church in 1765, located at the intersection of Pendleton Hill Road and Stillman Road. The third Baptist Church was established in 1828 to serve the rapidly growing population of millworkers in the village of North Stonington.

Men from the town participated in the French and Indian War of the 1760s; some marched as far as the siege of Montreal. But it was the Revolutionary War that garnered the town's enthusiasm. It is difficult to determine the precise number of townsmen who joined the fight, given that North Stonington still formed part of Stonington and clerks did not distinguish between the two locales. However, pension records and other documents from the 19th century indicate that numerous men joined various Continental and militia units, particularly the 6th and 8th Militia Regiments, the latter of which joined Gen. George Washington's army in the Battle of Long Island in the autumn of 1776. Three North Society men assumed notable roles in the war:

- Thomas Wheeler served first as a junior officer in the militia during a successful standoff against a British naval raiding party against Stonington Borough in August 1775, then served as a company commander in the Eighth Regiment of Militia during the following year's campaign in New York.
- Elias Sanford Palmer served as a lieutenant in Wadsworth's Brigade during the Long Island campaign in late 1776 and remained in the militia service during the war and beyond; by the 1790s, he was commander of the 30th Militia Regiment.
- Charles Hewitt, an enlisted man, was part of a 40-member raiding party that captured General Richard Prescott at his home in Newport, Rhode Island during the night of July 10, 1777. Prescott was the British commander of a large occupation force of Hessian soldiers. Hewitt died young, perishing of yellow fever while at sea in 1779.

=== Mills and incorporation: Late 18th century to mid-19th century ===
As early as the first part of the 18th century first- and second-generation farmers in North Stonington began harnessing the power of the town's rivers and streams to establish grist mills and sawmills. For example, Samuel Richardson, one of the first settlers in what is now the village, already had a mill in use along the Shunock River by 1702. However, it was only in the 1790s, after the United States had gained its independence, that mills began to emerge throughout the town in a serious way. The primary reason for this was that the town's farmers were no longer focused on clearing land and subsistence cultivation, and were now producing ever-larger crop and livestock yields that could be exported to markets, either in Connecticut or as far away as in Boston and the West Indies. Second, during this period the country was emerging into a period of economic prosperity after the deprivations and uncertainty of the war years.

Mills during the late 18th century quickly began to proliferate in the village along the Shunock River to such an extent that the locale took the name of "Milltown", and the Avery family and other landowners began to sell lots along what is now the western end of Main Street to house businesses and dwellings for workers in the mills. Smaller communities, with their own churches, post offices, mills, and stores, emerged in Burch's Falls (renamed Clark's Falls in the 1860s) and Laurel Glen, both in the eastern end of town, and Ashwillet and Pendleton Hill (known as Pauchunganuc until the 1840s), located respectively in the northwestern and northeastern corners of the town. Individual mills also emerged throughout the town to meet the grain and lumber milling needs of local communities at a distance from the five towns within the town.

By the early part of the 19th century North Stonington's residents began to regard themselves as possessing a character separate from the communities of the southern part of the town to which they were still connected. The communities of Mystic, Stonington Borough, and Pawcatuck were far away—by the standards of the pre-automobile era—and, being of a seafaring nature, the "southerners" possessed significantly different needs and interests. Efforts by the southern communities from the late 18th century to build a number of relatively expensive construction projects along the coastline, such as a new road from Stonington Borough to Mystic and a bridge over Lambert's Cove, at first led residents of the northern end of the town to oppose budgeting monies for these projects, and eventually caused the northerners to secede and form their own town. At a town hall meeting at Stonington's Road Church in April 1807, a small majority of voters decided for division, using the old dividing line between the North and South societies of the Congregationalist Church as the demarcation line. The new town then sent a request for the State Assembly to approve the measure.

The Assembly, which met the following month, approved the new town's independence, but did not endorse the town's proposed new name of Jefferson, and instead directed that the town would be named "North Stonington", citing as justification that for almost a century the northern part of Stonington had been known by that name. While the Assembly's reasoning is superficially logical, its rejection of the name "Jefferson" almost certainly was motivated by the considerable antagonism held by dominant Federalist politicians in Hartford, who led New England in their opposition to President Jefferson and his policies. We do not know the reason why the country's third president—then midway through his second term—was so popular among North Stonington residents, although perhaps Jefferson's public criticism of the Congregational Church's domination of politics and religion in Connecticut earned him the loyalty of the local Baptist community, which perhaps regarded him as a champion of their rights in a state that still enshrined preferential rights to the Congregational Church.

An inventory of the town's taxable assets in the following year, 1808, provides a snapshot of the town's economic profile. The town was still predominantly devoted to agriculture. 53 percent of the town's area was given over to cultivation or pasture, the remainder being taken up by wooded land, much of it in rocky outcrops or in swamps. The town's roughly 2,500 residents lived in about 750 dwellings and possessed about 445 mature oxen and bulls, 1,354 cattle, and 388 horses. There were 3,335 sheep, a reflection of the prodigious wool business in the town as a result of trade barriers erected by the United States against British textile imports that spurred considerable domestic demand for woolen products.

At the same time, this same inventory shows the growing affluence in the town, a reflection of the town's agricultural wealth and growing mill activity. Five stores—including one with two floors—had sprung up. Two eminent citizens owned chaises: Revolutionary War veteran Elias Sanford Palmer of Pauchunganuc Hill, and Thomas Prentice, who lived in the northwest part of town. Shopkeepers Daniel and Saxton Miner in Milltown owned the sole other vehicle mentioned, a "carriage on springs". Nine leading citizens, including Elias Sanford Palmer and Thomas Prentice, also possessed another status symbol: clocks with "steel and brass parts". Serving not just the thirst of the townspeople but also of the many millworkers were nine taverns, five of which were connected with stores.

North Stonington and its older sister Stonington played an enthusiastic role in the War of 1812, even if the war itself was deeply unpopular in Connecticut and elsewhere in New England. During the war North Stonington resident Lieutenant Colonel William Randall, the great-grandson of original settler John Randall, commanded the 30th regiment of Connecticut militia, which was mobilized twice. The first time was in June 1813, when Randall's regiment—which consisted of about 300 men, equally from Stonington and North Stonington—force-marched overnight in driving rain to Groton to help defend the city against a feared landing by British naval forces. The 30th Regiment returned to the colors again in August 1814, when a squadron of British warships bombarded Stonington Borough in preparation for a raid on the town. It was during this battle that Lantern Hill obtained the nickname "Tar Barrel Hill", because, in anticipation of an attack on Stonington, soldiers had moved pitch in barrels to its summit to set them alight to serve as an alarm if British forces appeared in the Sound. The flames and smoke from this hill alerted Randall and his men to react and move quickly to Stonington Point to repulse the attempted raiding party that intended to put Stonington Borough to the torch.

The 1820s and 1830s saw continued growth of Milltown as a commercial center, to include the building of two fulling mills to process the town's prodigious wool production, as well as a tannery, an iron works, cabinetmaking shops, and multiple grain mills and stores to serve the large factory workforce. The town's overall population rose from 2,500 shortly after incorporation to over 2,800 by the 1830s, and commercial activity during this period was facilitated by the opening in 1820 of the New London-Providence Turnpike, which today is known as Route 184.

It was also during this period that the Wheeler family accumulated much of its mercantile wealth through its stores and trading connections. Maj. Dudley Wheeler (1796–1888) was the most prominent member of the family at this time; in addition to owning two stores in town, he also was extensively involved in the wool export business and during mid-century worked out of an import-export office in New York City. Over the next century, the Wheelers left their mark on the town through a number of legacies including providing large donations to the Congregational Church and the school system. Wheeler's son Dwight donated one of the family's stores to become the town hall in 1904 (today this building is the Old Town Hall). Unfortunately, the impressive Wheeler home located across the street from the town hall was destroyed by fire in 1938 and never rebuilt; today the location is occupied by a parking lot.

Another leading businessman during this period was Stephen A. Main (1805–86) who like Dudley Wheeler established himself as a local businessman and mill owner before moving to New York City to work in various commercial enterprises. After the Civil War Main returned to North Stonington and bought one of Dudley Wheeler's stores in Milltown; Main's home today houses the North Stonington Historical Society. The commercial boom in the town was by no means limited to just a few families, and permitted the construction of many ornate homes in Milltown and elsewhere, many of which have survived to this day.

Almost as soon as the town established itself as a commercial center larger, even, than Westerly, however, it was quickly bypassed by the effects of the Industrial Revolution, which favored larger towns astride similarly larger rivers to erect huge mills. North Stonington's population plummeted from the late 1830s as people left to work in Westerly and Norwich. By 1840 the town's population had dropped to 2,269, and by 1870 it was down to 1,759. Adding to North Stonington's decline in population was that an increasing number of the town's youth were joining the wave of migrants heading west to try their fortunes on the frontier. Adventuresome townspeople had been attempting this before the Revolution—an early attempt to settle the then-wild Wyoming Valley in Pennsylvania in the 1760s ended in disaster—but in the 1790s small groups began leaving to help settle new towns in upstate New York and, later, Ohio. Out-migration through the late 19th and early 20th centuries caused the town's population to gradually decline, despite the fact that the families still tended to be large.

=== Civil War era: Last hurrah for mills ===
While men from North Stonington joined several Connecticut regiments during the Civil War, the best-known of these was the 21st Regiment of Connecticut Volunteers because its "G" company consisted completely of North Stonington residents. The 21st, arriving in Virginia, saw its first major combat in late 1862 during the Battle of Fredericksburg, endured heavy casualties at Drewry's Bluff in 1863, and participated in Grant's drive on Richmond in mid- to late 1864. Attrition was so high among officers in the regiment that North Stonington resident James F. Brown, who entered the war as commander of "G" company, ended the war as a lieutenant colonel and commander of the regiment. William S. Hubbel, who enlisted in the regiment from North Stonington, earned the Medal of Honor for capturing a large number of Confederate soldiers while leading a small raiding party in 1864.

The Civil War created a large market for woolen products for the Army, leading to a temporary resurgence in mill activity in North Stonington. Jumping at the new commercial opportunity, Alfred Clark built a large carding factory to process wool in Burch's Falls, costing him $34,000. The factory existed only until 1895, but the change in the community's name to Clark's Falls was permanent. The foundation of the old factory remains, a short distance southwest of the center of Clarks Falls, which is at the intersection of Route 216 and Clark's Falls Road. A few other mills in Milltown (North Stonington village) and Laurel Glen survived until the early part of the 20th century.

=== Rural quiet: 1870s to 1930s ===
After the Civil War, the population of North Stonington—like most of rural New England—continued to dwindle, so that by 1910, after just over a century since its incorporation, the number of residents stood at only 1,100, less than two-fifths than at the town's height during the mill era. The town's youth continued to migrate to the big cities to earn their fortunes, or to join the wave of pioneers flocking west to settle the frontier. As people left the town, land prices steadily deflated, enabling some farmers with means to buy up large tracts throughout North Stonington and adjoining towns. One such land baron and renowned town character, Lafayette Main, amassed such large holdings through the western end of town (as well in adjoining towns) that when asked how many acres he owned, would reply, "I really don't know. I have never been over half of it." Depopulation and the growing mechanization of agriculture caused a gradual reduction in the number of farms and acreage devoted to cultivation and pasturage, which beginning in the latter half of the 19th century led to a gradual but inexorable return of the forest, to the point where today the town is largely under trees.

Some of the people who left North Stonington during this era went on to become leading citizens elsewhere in New England. Samuel Prentice, born in 1850, attended Yale University and served as Connecticut's Chief Justice during 1913–1920. Otis Randall, born in 1860 and a scion of one of the town's founding families, become a professor of mathematics at Brown University and was that institution's dean during 1913–1930. Finally, Ellen Fitz Pendleton was the sixth president of Wellesley College, presiding at that institution during 1911–1936.

The Wheeler School and Library, with a building erected in 1901, offered free secondary education to town youngsters and also took in outside boarders. The library was on the second floor. In 1950, North Stonington replaced the 15 one-room schools with a consolidated school for the primary grades. Secondary students attended Stonington High for a time, then in 1956 a new Wheeler High School opened. In succeeding years a junior high and elementary school were built nearby. Today the original building still serves the town as its library.

In the early 20th century progress arrived to re-stitch the town economically with the outer world, first in 1906 in the form of a trolley line that traversed North Stonington on its way from Westerly to Norwich. The trolley line ran for 15 years, until bankrupted by the opening of the Route 2 highway for automobiles on the old Westerly-Norwich stage road. In 1933–1934 Route 184 was put through along the route of the old New London-Providence Turnpike. Its extra heavy under-layers of gravel has never required repair. For a generation this highway was the primary automobile route to Providence and Boston along the southern coast of New England.

=== North Stonington and modern challenges: 1940s and beyond ===
The establishment of paved highways through the town in the 1920s and 1930s laid the foundation for the rapid population growth and dramatic economic changes wrought after World War II in North Stonington and elsewhere in New London County. During the 1950s and 1960s, North Stonington became a bedroom community for the postwar defense industry and military community of southeastern Connecticut, including such companies as Electric Boat, Pfizer, and Underwater Sound Laboratory. As a result, the town added 600 inhabitants during the 1950s (with the construction of the Cedar Ridge development) and three times that amount in the 1960s (with the opening of the Kingswood/Meadow Wood development near The Village). The town became readily accessible to anywhere in late 1964, when Interstate 95 was built and two exits were opened in North Stonington. Starting in the 1970s, a number of "tech parks" opened in North Stonington's southeastern corner, adjacent to I-95. The dramatic growth in the town's population had a direct impact on the size of the school system; whereas in the late 1950s the average graduating class ran in the teens, by 1965 it had more than doubled to 42, and was 51 in 1968. School population since then has mirrored that of the town's gradual increase, and the graduating class of 2006 was 65, although Wheeler remains one of the smallest high schools in Connecticut.

The town's rapid residential growth led to the development in 1963 of planning and zoning restrictions and guidelines as citizens became increasingly anxious about the potential for overdevelopment destroying the rural nature of the town. Population growth in the past thirty years has continued, but at nowhere near the break-neck pace of the 1950s and 1960s; today, some residents wish to maintain the town's rural charm and bedroom nature while others wish to boost the local economy and capitalize on area tourism to lessen the tax burden on residents. Because of its access to I-95, rural charm, and proximity to the Mashantucket casino in the adjacent town of Ledyard, North Stonington has attracted numerous would-be developers who have advanced much-needed entertainment park ideas for the town.

North Stonington residents and visitors cherish the town for its beauty and historic value. In 1983 the village was added to the National Register of Historic Places, based on 58 existing homes and other buildings from the late 18th and early 19th centuries within its environs. Two houses located elsewhere in the town, for their age and historic value, are also on the register: the homes of Luther Palmer and John Randall.

=== Sources ===
- Cracker Barrel Chronicle, vols I-II, George Stone, North Stonington Historical Society, 1985/86.
- Days and Recollections of North Stonington, Cyrus Henry Brown, paper read before the Rhode Island Historical Society, November 9, 1916.
- Gazetteer of the States of Connecticut and Rhode Island, John C. Pease and John Niles, Hartford, 1819.
- History of New London County, Connecticut, D. Hamilton Hurd, ed., 1882.
- Milltown Militia: North Stonington Volunteers in the Civil War, Cindy Anderson Holman, 1986.
- Stonington During the American Revolution, Norman Francis Boas, Norwich, 1990.
- The Way of Duty: A Woman And Her Family in Revolutionary America, Joy Day Buel and Richard Buel, Jr., 1984. [Accounts of Rev. Joseph Fish]

== Demographics ==
Historical population
Census	Pop.	Note	%±
1820	2,624		—
1850	1,936		—
1860	1,913		−1.2%
1870	1,759		−8.1%
1880	1,769		0.6%
1890	1,463		−17.3%
1900	1,240		−15.2%
1910	1,100		−11.3%
1920	1,144		4.0%
1930	1,135		−0.8%
1940	1,236		8.9%
1950	1,367		10.6%
1960	1,982		45.0%
1970	3,748		89.1%
1980	4,219		12.6%
1990	4,884		15.8%
2000	4,991		2.2%
2010	5,297		6.1%
2020	5,149		−2.8%
U.S. Decennial Census

As of the census of 2000, there were 4,991 people, 1,833 households, and 1,424 families residing in the town. The population density was 91.9 inhabitants per square mile (35.5/km^{2}). There were 2,052 housing units at an average density of 37.8 per square mile (14.6/km^{2}). The racial makeup of the town was 94.31% White, 0.60% African American, 2.06% Native American, 1.06% Asian, 0.22% from other races, and 1.74% from two or more races. Hispanic or Latino of any race were 1.44% of the population.

There were 1,833 households, out of which 35.0% had children under the age of 18 living with them, 65.7% were married couples living together, 7.7% had a female householder with no husband present, and 22.3% were non-families. 16.3% of all households were made up of individuals, and 6.2% had someone living alone who was 65 years of age or older. The average household size was 2.71 and the average family size was 3.03.

In the town, the population was spread out, with 25.1% under the age of 18, 6.4% from 18 to 24, 29.8% from 25 to 44, 28.3% from 45 to 64, and 10.4% who were 65 years of age or older. The median age was 40 years. For every 100 females, there were 101.1 males. For every 100 females age 18 and over, there were 101.2 males.

The median income for a household in the town was $57,887, and the median income for a family was $61,733. Males had a median income of $45,625 versus $29,133 for females. The per capita income for the town was $25,815. About 3.3% of families and 4.8% of the population were below the poverty line, including 5.1% of those under age 18 and 1.5% of those age 65 or over.
