= Samuel Miner House =

Historic house in Connecticut, United States

- U.S. National Register of Historic Places
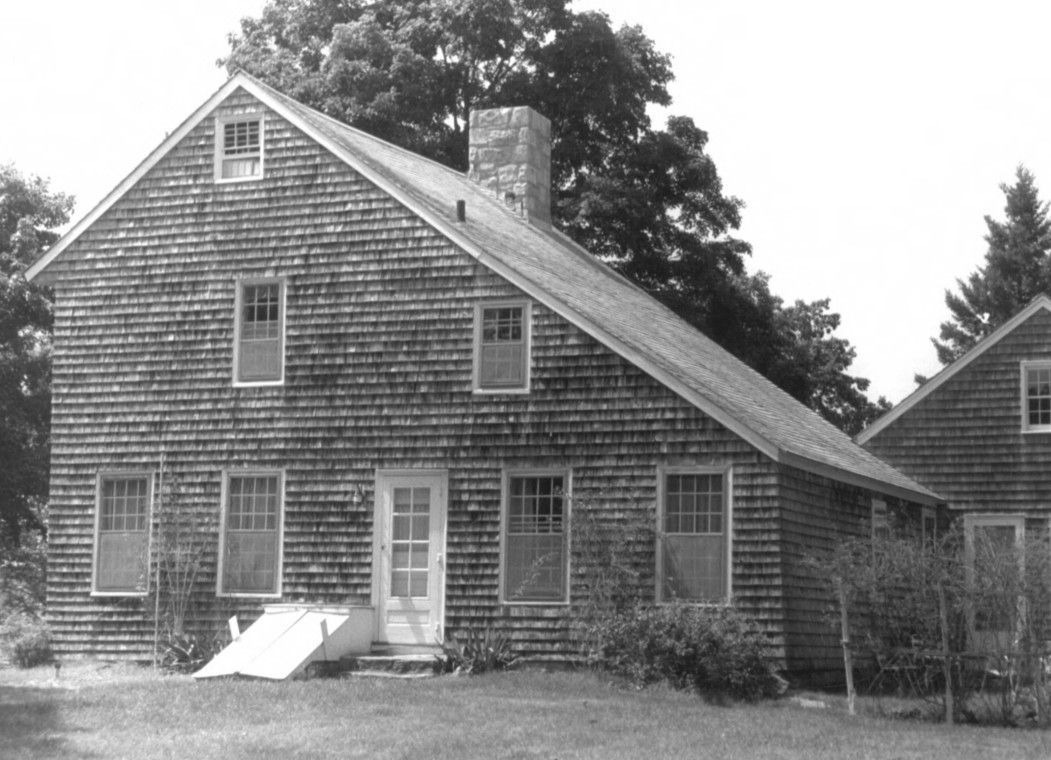
- 1975 photo

- Location within Connecticut Location within the United States
- Location: North of North Stonington off CT 2 on Hewitt Road, North Stonington, Connecticut
- Coordinates: 41°26′57″N 71°53′26″W
- Area: 6 acres (2.4 ha)
- Built: 1717
- Architectural style: Colonial, One-Room Plan
- NRHP reference No.: 76001995
- Added to NRHP: June 18, 1976

The Samuel Miner House was a historic house on Hewitt Road in North Stonington, Connecticut. Built in 1717, it was a unique and rare example of a house that was constructed of apple, oak, sycamore and chestnut wood, The house was destroyed by fire in April 2003. with a particularly well-preserved late First Period bedchamber. It was listed on the National Register of Historic Places in 1976.

== Description and history ==
The Samuel Miner House was located in a rural setting northwest of the village center of North Stonington, on Hewitt Road, a dirt lane off Connecticut Route 2. It was a 2 1/2-story timber-frame structure, with a gabled roof, end chimney, and clapboarded exterior. Unusually for houses of the period, the main facade was what is generally considered a side elevation, with the roof ridge perpendicular. The roof extended down to the first floor on the right side, giving the house a saltbox profile. The main entrance was roughly in the center of the facade, with two bays of windows on either side, placed with some asymmetry. There were two irregularly placed windows on the second floor, and a small window set just below the gable peak.

The house was an architecturally unusual example of a late First Period colonial residence. It unusually retained its single-pile structure, with a large single room on each floor, and a chimney at the end. The side-facing leanto section was added sometime in the 18th century. The interior was also distinctive for its use of a variety of different woods for the flooring and finishes, as well as three large granite fireplaces. The second-floor bedchamber was a rare example of an early 18th-century room finished before the use of horsehair plaster became more common: it had been finished entirely in wooden wainscoting and paneling.

== See also ==
- National Register of Historic Places listings in New London County, Connecticut
