= Pattagansett River =

Coordinates: 41°17′51″N 72°13′35″W

The Pattagansett River is a river located in the town of East Lyme, Connecticut, near the village of Niantic. Fishing for bass is a popular activity.
