= Shunock River =

Coordinates: 41°24′31″N 71°50′34″W

National Wild and Scenic River
- Designated: March 12, 2019

The Shunock River is a river belonging to Connecticut state in the United States of America. It is an eastward flowing river that joins the Pawcatuck River. According to a 1978 study, the lower Shunock River valley had a good potential for sustainable exploitation of its ground water reserves.

== Etymology ==
The name Shunock means a place where confluence of two rivers takes place in Native American language.

== Town Hall Bridge ==
The Town Hall Bridge, on the main street of North Stonington, over the Shuncok was a National Register of Historic Places listed monument. It was washed away during the March 2010 floods on 30 March 2010. The bridge connected two parts of the town situated on either banks of the river. The bridge has been subsequently rebuilt, the two arch bridge having been replaced by a concrete single arc one.

== See also ==
- List of rivers of Connecticut
