= Merrick Brook =

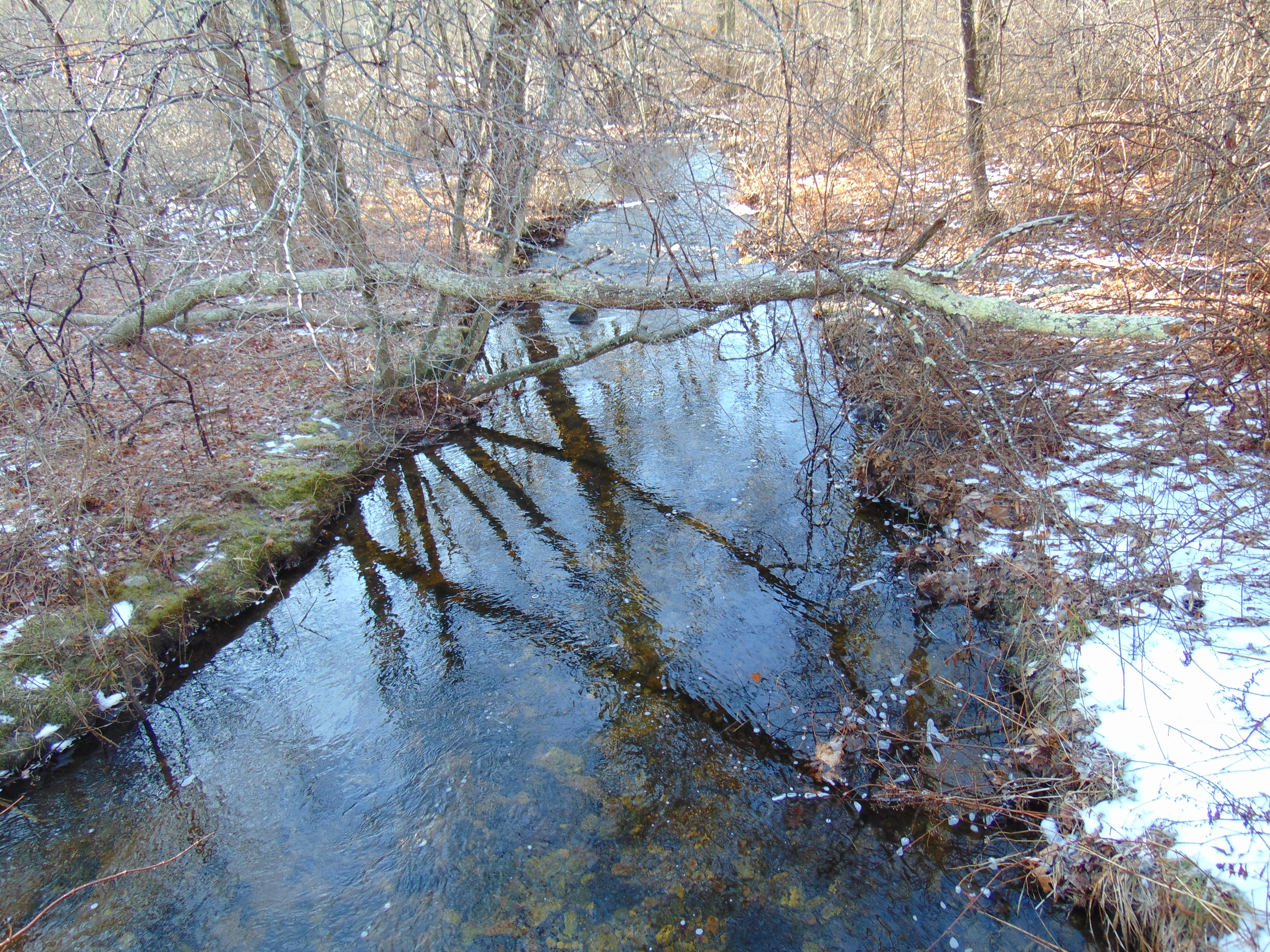
- Merrick Brook in the winter

Location
- County: United States
- State: Connecticut
- Towns: Chaplin, Hampton, Scotland

Physical characteristics
- Source
  - location: Unnamed Pond, Chaplin, Connecticut
  - coordinates: 41.7833°N 72.1104°W
- Mouth
  - location: Shetucket River, Scotland, Connecticut
  - coordinates: 41.6606°N 72.1104°W
- Length: 12 mi (19 km)
- Width
  - minimum: 5.6 feet (1.7 m)
  - average: 39.1 feet (11.9 m)
  - maximum: 117.8 feet (35.9 m)

Basin features
- Population: 3,000
- Tributaries
  - left: Beaver Brook, Clover Brook
- Waterbodies: Large Unnamed Ponds
- Bridges: US 6 Route 14

Merrick Brook is a stream that runs through the towns of Scotland, Hampton, and Chaplin, Connecticut. It begins at an unnamed pond in eastern Chaplin and flows down into the Shetucket River at the very southern part of Scotland. It flows through Clarks Corner, Hampton, and the center of Scotland. It offers many wild trout for fishing.

== Crossings ==
All crossings are in Windham County, Connecticut.

Town	Crossing Name	Coordinates
Chaplin	Cedar Swamp Road	41.7830°N 72.1015°W
Chaplin	Goshen Road	41.7826°N 72.0964°W
Hampton	Potter Road	41.7788°N 72.0923°W
Hampton	US 6	41.7692°N 72.0905°W
Hampton	Airline State Park Trail	41.7692°N 72.0905°W
Hampton	Parker Road	41.7644°N 72.0880°W
Hampton	Calvin Burnham Road	41.7608°N 72.0953°W
Scotland	Kemp Road	41.7317°N 72.0826°W
Scotland	Brook Road	41.7237°N 72.0849°W
Scotland	Brooklyn Turnpike	41.7224°N 72.0866°W
Scotland	Kasacek Road	41.7192°N 72.0864°W
Scotland	Brook Road (Twice in a row)	41.7113°N 72.0825°W 41.7042°N 72.0819°W
Scotland	Route 14	41.6984°N 72.0842°W
Scotland	Gager Hill Road	41.6916°N 72.0874°W
Scotland	Bass Road	41.6799°N 72.1055°W
Scotland	Station Road	41.6613°N 72.1096°W
Scotland	Providence and Worcester RR	41.6611°N 72.1098°W
Scotland	Shetucket River (End)	41.6606°N 72.1104°W
