= Beaver Brook (Connecticut) =

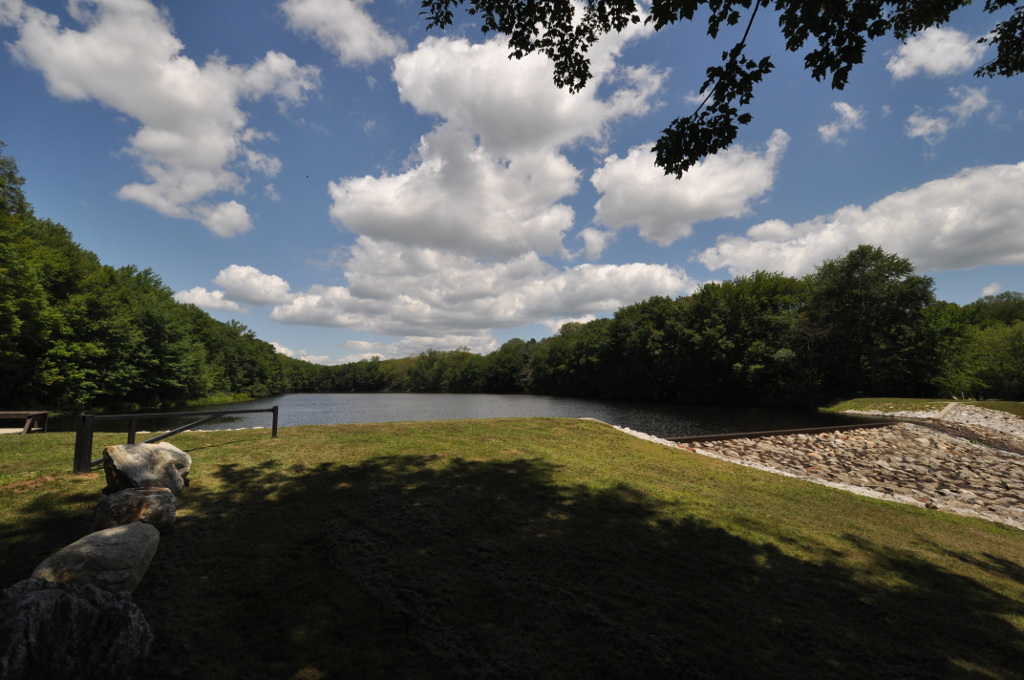
- The source of Beaver Brook

Location
- Country: United States
- State: Connecticut
- Towns: Windham, Scotland

Physical characteristics
- Source
  - location: Bibbins Pond, Windham
  - coordinates: 41.7303°N 72.1255°W
- Mouth
  - location: Merrick Brook, Scotland
  - coordinates: 41.6794°N 72.1090°W
- Length: 5 mi (8.0 km)
- Width
  - minimum: 6.5 ft (2.0 m)
  - average: 26.3 ft (8.0 m)
  - maximum: 805 ft (245 m)

Basin features
- Landmarks: Beaver Brook State Park
- Population: 3,000
- Waterbodies: Unnamed Pond
- Bridges: Route 14

Beaver Brook is a stream that runs through Windham and Scotland, Windham County, Connecticut. It is currently five miles long. It begins at Beaver Brook State Park in Windham, Connecticut, and flows down to Merrick Brook in Scotland, Connecticut.

== Crossings ==
Town	Crossing
Windham	Back Road
Windham	Bass Road
Windham	Brooklyn Turnpike
Scotland	Route 14
Scotland	Bass Road
Scotland	Merrick Brook
