= Glaistig =

Ghost from Scottish mythology

The glaistig /ˈɡlæʃtɪɡ/ is a ghost from Scottish mythology, a type of fuath. It is also known as maighdean uaine — the Green Maiden — and may appear as a woman of beauty or monstrous mien, as a half-woman and half-goat similar to a faun or satyr, or in the shape of a goat. The lower goat half of her hybrid form is usually disguised by a long, flowing green robe or dress, and the woman often appears grey with long yellow hair. This appearance may have been influenced by, or influenced, the closely related Norse folklore of "hidden-folk", Old Norse: hulder or huldra, across Scandinavia — along with the Faeroe Isles and Icelandic: Huldufólk — being beautiful women usually hiding legs and tail of an animal like a fox or a goat beneath clothing or long hair, with her named Skogsrå or Skogsfrun, the "Mistress of the Forest" in Swedish folklore.

== Variants ==
The glaistig is an ambivalent ghost that appears in legend as both a malicious and benign creature. Some stories have her luring men to her lair via either song or dance, where she would then drink their blood. Other tales have her casting stones in the path of travellers or throwing them off course.

In some benign incarnations, the glaistig is a type of tutelary spirit and protector of cattle and herders. One of the legends in Scotland, in the town of Ach-na-Creige, there was such a spirit protecting the cattle herds. The townsfolk, in gratitude, poured milk from the cows into a hollowed-out stone for her to drink. According to the same legend, her protection was revoked after one local youth poured boiling milk into the stone, burning her. She has also been described in some folklore as watching over children while their mothers milked the cows and fathers watched over the herds.

In some Scottish tales, the cows are replaced with deer, of which the glaistig is fiercely protective. Also known as the Scottish goddess of the hunt, the glaistig was both help and hindrance to hunters, going so far as to hide her herds if the hunters made the mistake of killing a doe instead of a stag. Occasionally, hunters would be granted permission to shoot if they provided an offering, such as the hind of the deer to the herder. Another name of this instance is the Maiden of Callart.

In the neighbouring Manx folklore, there is the similarly named shape-shifting Glashtyn, a water spirit.

=== The Green Lady ===
Another rendition of the glaistig legend is that she was once a mortal noblewoman, to whom a "fairy" nature had been given or who was cursed with the goat's legs and immortality, and since has been known as "The Green Lady". She might either be benign, watching over houses and looking after the weak mind, or appear as a vengeful ghost. In some tales she was murdered in a green dress, and then stuffed unceremoniously up the chimney by a servant. It is said that her footsteps can still be heard as she walks the castle in sadness. In most tales, she would continue to look after the house, upholding household duties, such as washing dishes and sweeping the floor. She might be heard moving around furniture at night. If she becomes offended by the servants or the tenants she is known to play pranks on them. Such Green Lady myths have been associated with a number of locations in Scotland, including Ardnacallich, Dunollie Castle, Loch Fyne, Muchalls Castle, Tulloch Castle, and in Wales at Caerphilly. A similar tale ("Ocean Born Mary") has been told in Henniker, New Hampshire.

- Green Lady of Fyvie, a ghost that supposedly wanders the corridors of Fyvie Castle in Aberdeenshire, Scotland
- Green Lady of Ashintully Castle in the county of Perthshire, Scotland
- Green Lady of Ballindalloch Castle in Aberdeenshire, Scotland
- Green Lady of the Barony of Ladyland in North Ayrshire, Scotland
- Green Lady of Crathes Castle in Aberdeenshire, Scotland
- Green Lady of Tulloch Castle in Ross-shire, Scotland
- Green Lady of Knock Castle (Isle of Skye)
- Green Lady of Newton Castle
- Green Lady of Longleat in Somerset, South West England

== In literature ==
- A glaistig is a minor character in Martha Wells' 2006 short story The Potter's Daughter.
- A dark fairy queen called The Glaistig appears in "Waycross", one of the short stories in Caitlin R. Kiernan's Alabaster short story collection.
- A glaistig appears in Emma Bull's urban fantasy novel War For the Oaks.
- Glaistig Uaine is a supervillain in the serial webfiction Worm by Wildbow, who has the power to claim the souls of other superhumans and take their powers for herself.
- A glaistig named Troya is in Fish Out of Water by Hailey Edwards.
- Glaistigs appear in Melissa Marr's young adult series, Wicked Lovely.
