= Jacob Rice =

Jacob Rice may refer to:

- Jacob Rice (New Hampshire politician)
- Jacob Rice (New York politician)
