= Ashenden State Forest =

State Forest in Merrimack County, New Hampshire

Coordinates: 43°14′21″N 71°50′33″W

Ashenden State Forest, sometimes written as Ashendon State Forest, is a 165-acre (67-hectare) protected area in the town of Warner, New Hampshire. It was donated to the state by Katharine Brown. She subsequently donated an easement on an adjacent 83 acres (34 ha) including a historic farmhouse. Brown died in 2005. Ashenden State Forest is located south of Cunningham Pond, the Chandler Reservation, and the Harriman Chandler State Forest.

== See also ==
- List of New Hampshire state forests
