= Upton-Morgan State Forest =

State forest in Merrimack County, New Hampshire

Coordinates: 43°10′36″N 71°34′1″W

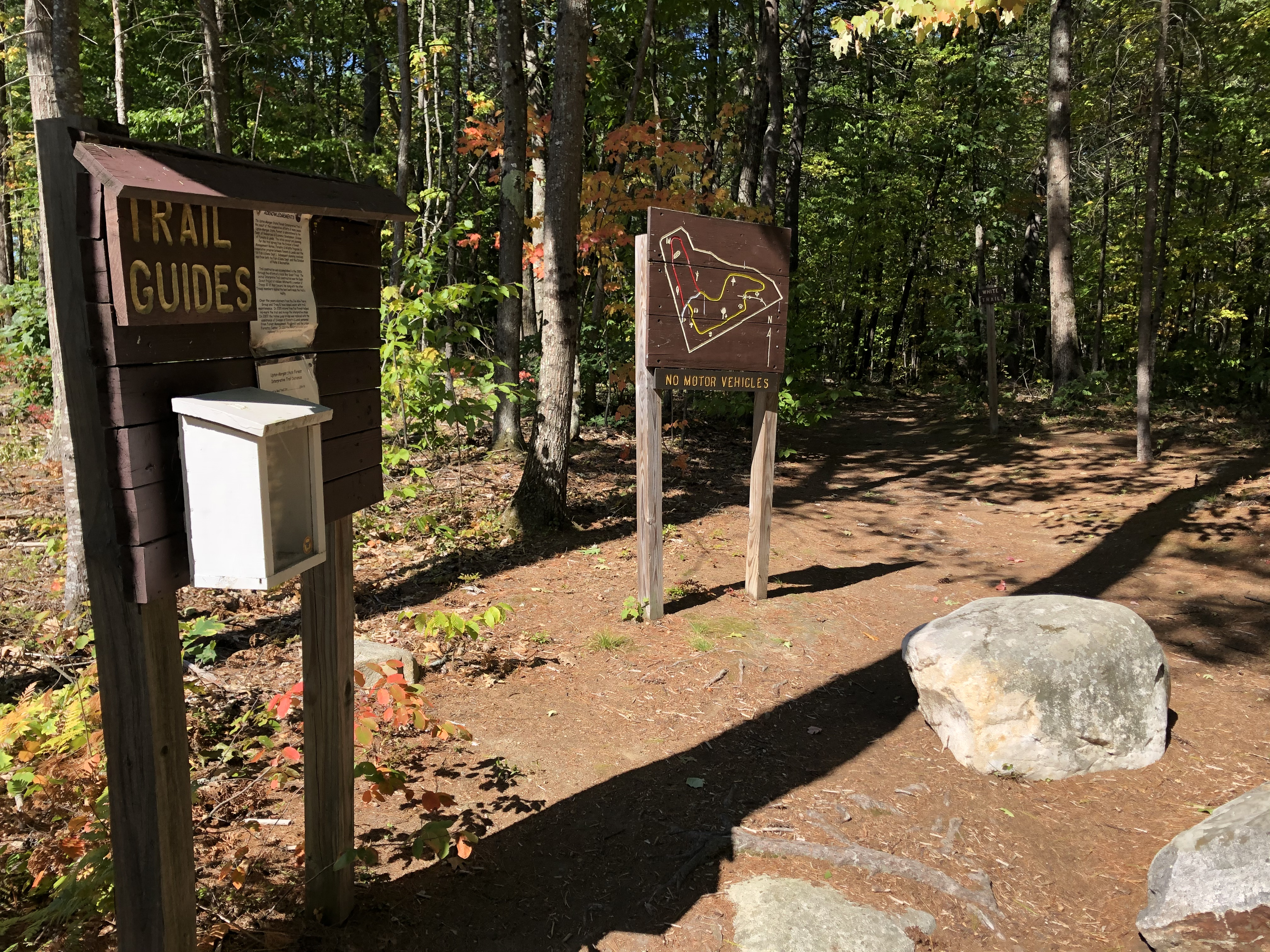
The forest's trailhead

Upton-Morgan State Forest is a 21-acre (8.5 ha) state forest in Concord, New Hampshire. It has a short interpretive trail.

It is located in the southwest part of Concord off Silk Farm Road and is bordered to the northwest by New Hampshire Route 13 (Clinton Street) and to the northeast by Interstate 89. Skunk cabbage (Symplocarpus foetidus) grows in the area.

In 1835, several Concord entrepreneurs bought the property, the Ballard Haselton farm, in order to raise silk worms, and planted mulberry trees on the land. The silk farm failed after a few years, though the name is preserved in the road that runs past the entrance to the forest. The land was later bought by David Morgan and Mark Upton, who transferred it to the State of New Hampshire in 1917 for the use of the State Asylum. The land was transferred to the New Hampshire Division of Forests and Lands in 1972.

== See also ==
- List of New Hampshire state forests
