= Black Mountain State Forest =

State forest in Grafton County, New Hampshire

Coordinates: 44°4′45″N 71°56′0″W

- Black Mountain Forest
- Location: Grafton County, NH
- Nearest city: Haverhill, New Hampshire
- Area: 795 acres (322 ha)
- Established: 1919
- Governing body: New Hampshire Department of Natural and Cultural Resources

Black Mountain State Forest is a 795-acre (322 ha) state forest in Haverhill, New Hampshire, on the western slopes of Black Mountain, a 2,840-foot (870 m) summit at the western edge of the White Mountains. In 1920 a report was issued on the state forest area that was then 343 acres (139 ha) and included a Black Mountain Lookout Station (no longer present). It was composed of pasture and young spruce. The original tract was purchased in 1919 and 1920. The state forest is bordered to the east by the White Mountain National Forest, which covers the summit of the mountain.

== See also ==
- List of New Hampshire state forests
