= Hemenway State Forest =

State Forest in Carroll County, New Hampshire

Coordinates: 43°53′5″N 71°18′7″W

- Along Hemenway Road at the northern end of the forest
- Location: Carroll County, New Hampshire
- Nearest city: Conway, New Hampshire
- Area: 2,106 acres (8.52 km^{2})
- Established: 1932
- Governing body: New Hampshire Department of Natural and Cultural Resources

Hemenway State Forest is a 2,106-acre (852 ha) state forest in Tamworth, New Hampshire. It includes the Big Pines Natural Area, an area of large white pine trees, including one of New Hampshire's largest, accessible via a parking area and loop trail off Route 113A. The trail also crosses the Swift River with a wooden pedestrian bridge. A spur trail connects to an observation tower atop Great Hill.

== See also ==
- List of New Hampshire state forests
