= List of New Hampshire state forests =

This is a list of New Hampshire state forests. State forests in the U.S. state of New Hampshire are overseen by the New Hampshire Division of Forests and Lands.

Park name	Location (of main entrance)	Area
Abbott State Forest	Concord	35 acres (14 ha)
Agnew State Forest	Jefferson	109 acres (44 ha)
Allen State Forest	Concord	30 acres (12 ha)
Alton Bay State Forest	Alton	210 acres (85 ha)
Ames State Forest	Henniker	13 acres (5.3 ha)
Ammonoosuc State Forest	Stark	8 acres (3.2 ha)
Annett State Forest	Rindge	1,336 acres (541 ha)
Annie Duncan State Forest	Plainfield	113 acres (46 ha)
Ashenden State Forest	Warner	168 acres (68 ha)
Ayers State Forest	Canterbury	50 acres (20 ha)
Ballard State Forest	Derry	71 acres (29 ha)
Bear Mountain State Forest	Hinsdale	156 acres (63 ha)
Belknap Mountain State Forest	Gilford	1,321 acres (535 ha)
Benton State Forest	Benton	440 acres (180 ha)
Big Island State Forest	Wentworth Location	284 acres (115 ha)
Black Mountain State Forest	Haverhill	729 acres (295 ha)
Blair State Forest	Campton	112 acres (45 ha)
Blue Job State Forest	Farmington	284 acres (115 ha)
Bowditch-Runnells State Forest	Tamworth	133 acres (54 ha)
Cape Horn State Forest	Northumberland	2,175 acres (880 ha)
Carroll State Forest	Warner	29 acres (12 ha)
Casalis State Forest	Peterborough	228 acres (92 ha)
Chemung State Forest	Meredith	385 acres (156 ha)
Cilley State Forest	Concord	166 acres (67 ha)
Connecticut Lakes State Forest	Pittsburg	1,648 acres (667 ha)
Connecticut River State Forest	Charlestown	216 acres (87 ha)
Contoocook State Forest	Hopkinton	30 acres (12 ha)
Conway Common Lands State Forest	Conway	569 acres (230 ha)
Cowden State Forest	South Hampton	18 acres (7.3 ha)
Craney Hill State Forest	Henniker	21 acres (8.5 ha)
Cushman State Forest	Bethlehem	28 acres (11 ha)
Davisville State Forest	Warner	18 acres (7.3 ha)
Davis-White State Forest	Warren	35 acres (14 ha)
Devils Slide State Forest	Stark	290 acres (120 ha)
District Number 5 State Forest	Concord	88 acres (36 ha)
Dodge Brook State Forest	Lempster	222 acres (90 ha)
Eaton State Forest	East Kingston	42 acres (17 ha)
Fall Mountain State Forest	Charlestown	943 acres (382 ha)
Fay State Forest	Lincoln	203 acres (82 ha)
Feuer State Forest	Marlow	68 acres (28 ha)
Foster and Colburn State Forest	Wentworth	240 acres (97 ha)
Fox State Forest	Hillsborough	1,445 acres (585 ha)
George Duncan State Forest	New Hampton	110 acres (45 ha)
Gile State Forest	Springfield	6,675 acres (2,701 ha)
Gilmore State Forest	Warner	37 acres (15 ha)
Goodwin-Chandler State Forest	Hopkinton	24 acres (9.7 ha)
Grant State Forest	Fitzwilliam	8 acres (3.2 ha)
Green Mountain State Forest	Effingham	15 acres (6.1 ha)
Hamel State Forest	Laconia	41 acres (17 ha)
Harriman-Chandler State Forest	Warner	395 acres (160 ha)
Haven State Forest	Jaffrey	95 acres (38 ha)
Hemenway State Forest	Tamworth	2,106 acres (852 ha)
Hodgman State Forest	Amherst	18 acres (7.3 ha)
Honey Brook State Forest	Marlow	975 acres (395 ha)
Hubbard Hill State Forest	Charlestown	759 acres (307 ha)
Huston-Morgan State Forest	Laconia	156 acres (63 ha)
Hyland Hill State Forest	Westmoreland	18 acres (7.3 ha)
Kearsarge Mountain State Forest	Warner	4,965 acres (2,009 ha)
Lang Station State Forest	New Boston	226 acres (91 ha)
Lead Mine State Forest	Shelburne	202 acres (82 ha)
Leighton State Forest	Dublin	117 acres (47 ha)
Litchfield State Forest	Litchfield	347 acres (140 ha)
Little Pine River State Forest	Ossipee	68 acres (28 ha)
Livermore Falls State Forest	Campton	174 acres (70 ha)
Lord Pines State Forest	Ossipee	12 acres (4.9 ha)
Lovewell Mountain State Forest	Washington	478 acres (193 ha)
Low State Forest	Hillsborough	1,666 acres (674 ha)
Marshall State Forest	New Ipswich	19 acres (7.7 ha)
Mascoma State Forest	Canaan	216 acres (87 ha)
Mast Yard State Forest	Hopkinton	644 acres (261 ha)
Max Israel State Forest	Washington	628 acres (254 ha)
Meadow Pond State Forest	Gilmanton	69 acres (28 ha)
Merrimack River State Forest	Boscawen	570 acres (230 ha)
Merriman State Forest	Bartlett	515 acres (208 ha)
Mount Major State Forest	Alton	750 acres (300 ha)
Nash Stream Forest	Odell	39,619 acres (16,033 ha)
Nottingham State Forest	Nottingham	14 acres (5.7 ha)
Opechee Bay State Forest	Laconia	48 acres (19 ha)
Page State Forest	Gilmanton	4 acres (1.6 ha)
Page's Corner State Forest	Bow	86 acres (35 ha)
Paugus Bay State Forest	Laconia	242 acres (98 ha)
Percy State Forest	Stark	77 acres (31 ha)
Pine River State Forest	Effingham	3,189 acres (1,291 ha)
Piscataquog State Forest	Weare	160 acres (65 ha)
Powwow River State Forest	South Hampton	50 acres (20 ha)
Prescott State Forest	Laconia	116 acres (47 ha)
Province Road State Forest	Dorchester	1,072 acres (434 ha)
Ragged Mountain State Forest	Andover	76 acres (31 ha)
Reed's Ferry State Forest	Bedford	122 acres (49 ha)
Rock Rimmon State Forest	Kingston	47 acres (19 ha)
Russell State Forest	Mason	25 acres (10 ha)
Russell-Abbott State Forest	Wilton	887 acres (359 ha)
Russell-Shea State Forest	Concord	125 acres (51 ha)
Saltmarsh Pond State Forest	Gilford	73 acres (30 ha)
Sanborn State Forest	Gilmanton	51 acres (21 ha)
Scribner-Fellows State Forest	Ashland	142 acres (57 ha)
Second Presidential State Forest	Lincoln	1,160 acres (470 ha)
Sentinel Mountain State Forest	Piermont	235 acres (95 ha)
Shadow Hill State Forest	Sutton	34 acres (14 ha)
Shaker State Forest	Canterbury	226 acres (91 ha)
Shieling Forest	Peterborough	48 acres (19 ha)
Sky Pond State Forest	New Hampton	127 acres (51 ha)
Soucook River State Forest	Loudon	50 acres (20 ha)
Southeast State Forest	Nottingham	4 acres (1.6 ha)
State Forest Nursery	Boscawen	887 acres (359 ha)
Stevens Pines State Forest	Nottingham	4 acres (1.6 ha)
Strawberry Hill State Forest	Bethlehem	53 acres (21 ha)
Sugar Hill State Forest	Bristol	684 acres (277 ha)
Swain State Forest	Laconia	106 acres (43 ha)
Taylor State Forest	Concord	10 acres (4.0 ha)
Totten Trails State Forest	Henniker	109 acres (44 ha)
Upton-Morgan State Forest	Concord	21 acres (8.5 ha)
Urban Forestry Center	Portsmouth	182 acres (74 ha)
Vienna Smith State Forest	Nottingham	49 acres (20 ha)
Vincent State Forest	Weare	627 acres (254 ha)
Wade State Forest	Hill	430 acres (170 ha)
Walker State Forest	Concord	51 acres (21 ha)
Welton Falls State Forest	Alexandria	218 acres (88 ha)
West Iron Works Road State Forest	Concord	42 acres (17 ha)
White Farm State Forest	Concord	113 acres (46 ha)
William Thomas State Forest	Hill	1,660 acres (670 ha)
Woodman State Forest	Northwood	138 acres (56 ha)

The former Gay State Forest was transferred to the Society for the Protection of New Hampshire Forests in 2009.

== See also ==
- List of national forests of the United States
- List of New Hampshire state parks
