= Taylor Mill State Historic Site =

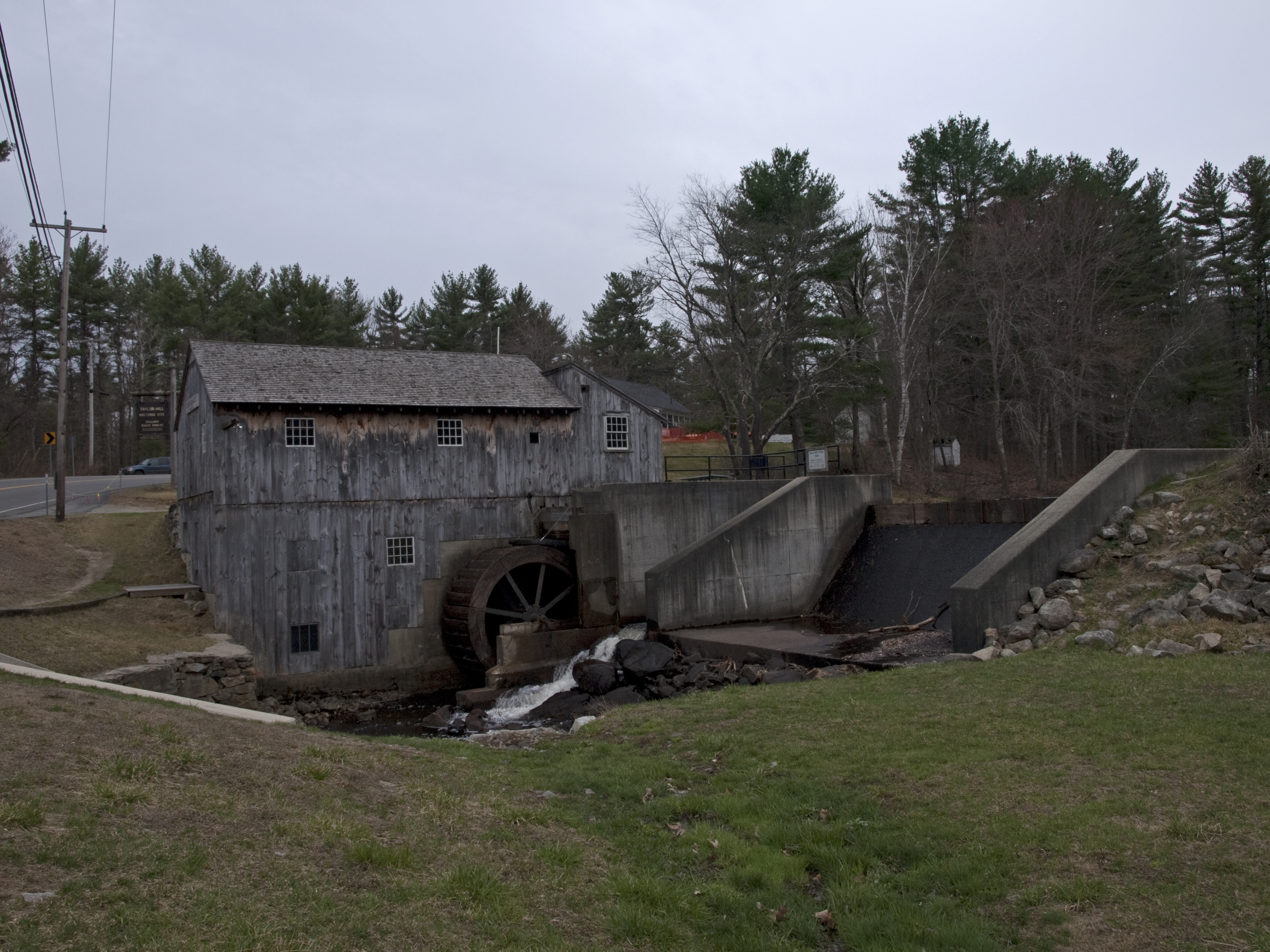
- Taylor Mill

- Location within New Hampshire
- Location: Derry, New Hampshire, United States
- Coordinates: 42°52′32″N 71°14′21″W
- Elevation: 269 feet (82 m)
- Administrator: New Hampshire Division of Parks and Recreation & New Hampshire Division of Forests and Lands
- Designation: New Hampshire state park
- Website: Taylor Mill Historic Site

The Taylor Mill State Historic Site is a state park of New Hampshire located in 71-acre Ballard State Forest in Derry, Rockingham County, in the southeast part of the state. The site was created to protect the 1799 sawmill known as Taylor Up and Down Sawmill. The site is located on Island Pond Road, east of downtown Derry.

== History ==
Robert Taylor, an early owner of the sawmill, bought the land in 1799. The mill went in operation in the 1800s. It is unknown when it ceased operation. In 1939, the land was sold to Ernest Ballard. By that time, the original mill was scrapped, and Ballard bought a similar mill, which was disassembled, in Sandown, New Hampshire. Ballard and his wife spent two years assembling it and identifying missing parts. The most notable missing part was the water wheel, which he ordered from a company in Pennsylvania. In 1953, Ernest Ballard donated the mill and the land to the state of New Hampshire in 1953. This 71-acre (29 ha) property became Ballard State Forest, and the pond above the mill is known as Ballard Pond.

== Mill ==
The water wheel is 12 feet (3.7 m) in diameter and 6 feet (1.8 m) wide. The logs which can be sawed at the mill can not exceed 10 feet (3.0 m) in length and 28 inches (71 cm) in diameter. The mill operates at 60 strokes per minute. By operation type, the mill is an up and down mill, which is a mechanized version of a usual saw. This is an outdated technology, which was replaced by water-powered circular saw around 1825. Taylor Mill is one of the few examples of a surviving mill using this technology.
