= Conway Common Lands State Forest =

State Forest in Carroll County, New Hampshire

Coordinates: 44°4′5″N 71°3′24″W

- Location: Carroll County, New Hampshire
- Nearest city: Conway, New Hampshire, NH
- Area: 568 acres (230 ha)
- Governing body: New Hampshire Department of Natural and Cultural Resources

Conway Common Lands State Forest is a 568-acre (230 ha) state forest in Conway, New Hampshire, in the United States. It was organized a few years after the establishment of the New Hampshire Forestry Commission. Purchase of the lands and protection involved negotiation with a granite company based in Maine.

== See also ==
- List of New Hampshire state forests
