= Ames State Forest =

State forest in Merrimack County, New Hampshire

Coordinates: 43°10′19″N 71°45′42″W

Ames State Forest is in Henniker, New Hampshire. It covers 13 acres (5.3 ha). It was established after Flora Ames, a resident of Henniker, donated about 15 acres to the state for reforestation. Keyser Pond Campground on Keyser Pond and Craney Hill State Forest are nearby.

== See also ==
- List of New Hampshire state forests
