= Allen State Forest =

State forest in Merrimack County, New Hampshire

- Interactive map of Allen State Forest
- Type: State forest
- Location: Concord, Merrimack County, New Hampshire
- Coordinates: 43.256514°N 71.660515°W
- Area: 30 acres (0.12 km^{2})
- Operator: New Hampshire Division of Forests and Lands

Allen State Forest is a 30-acre (0.12 km^{2}) state forest of New Hampshire located in the northwest section of the city of Concord in Merrimack County. The state forest is located approximately 1,500 feet (460 m) north of the Contoocook River.
