= WNEC =

WNEC could refer to:

- Western New England College, a school in Springfield, Massachusetts.
- WNEC-FM, a radio station (91.7 FM) licensed to Henniker, New Hampshire.
