= Annett State Forest =

State forest in Cheshire County, New Hampshire

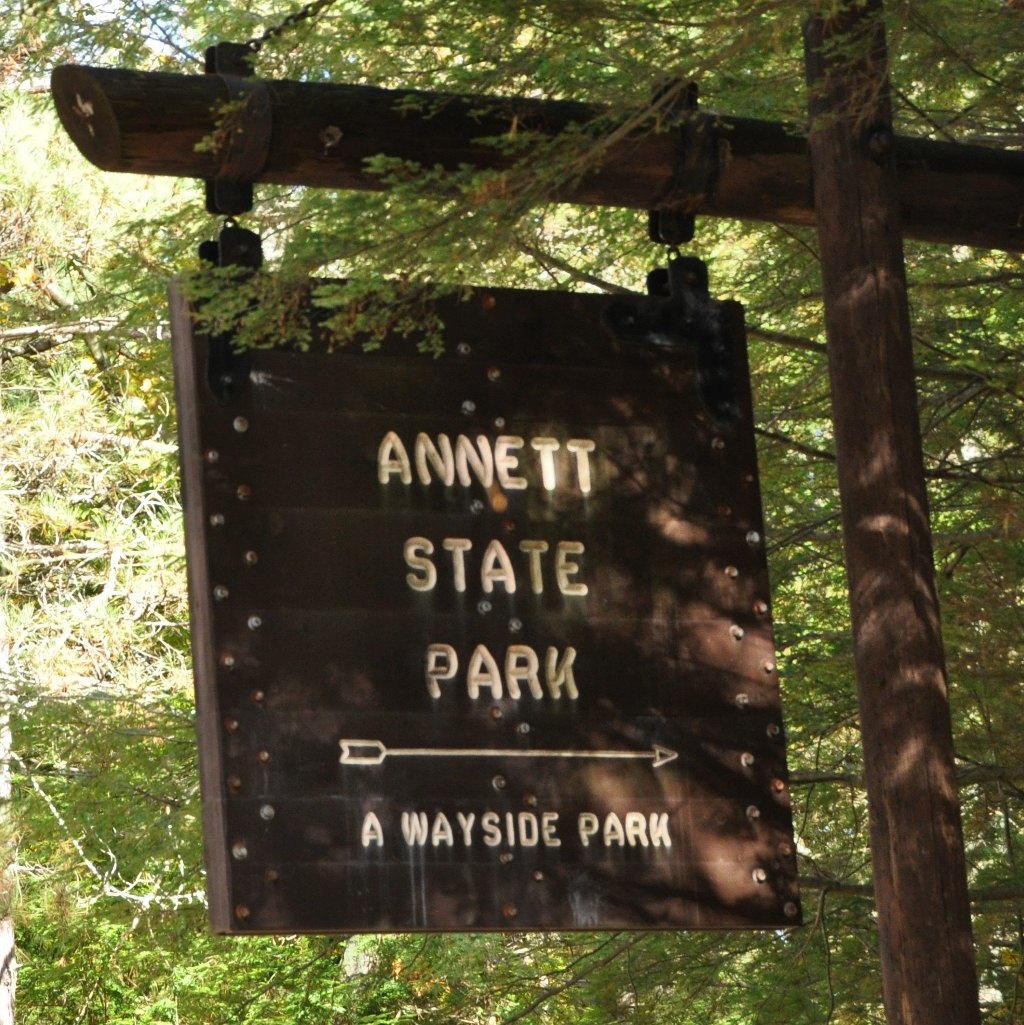
- Annett Wayside Park sign
- Interactive map of Annett State Forest
- Type: State forest
- Location: Rindge, Cheshire County; Sharon, Hillsborough County, New Hampshire
- Coordinates: 42.7852°N 71.9664°W
- Area: 1,494 acres (6.05 km^{2})
- Operator: New Hampshire Division of Forests and Lands
- Website: Annett Wayside Park (archived)

Annett State Forest is a 1,494-acre (6.05 km^{2}) state forest of New Hampshire located in the town of Rindge in Cheshire County and extending north into Sharon in Hillsborough County. It includes Annett Wayside Park and Hubbard Pond, which offers canoe access.

Annett Wayside Park at 538 Cathedral Road features picnic facilities and a 1/4-mile (0.40 km) hiking trail to Black Reservoir.
