= Henniker (CDP), New Hampshire =

Census-designated place in New Hampshire, United States

Henniker, New Hampshire
- Census-designated place
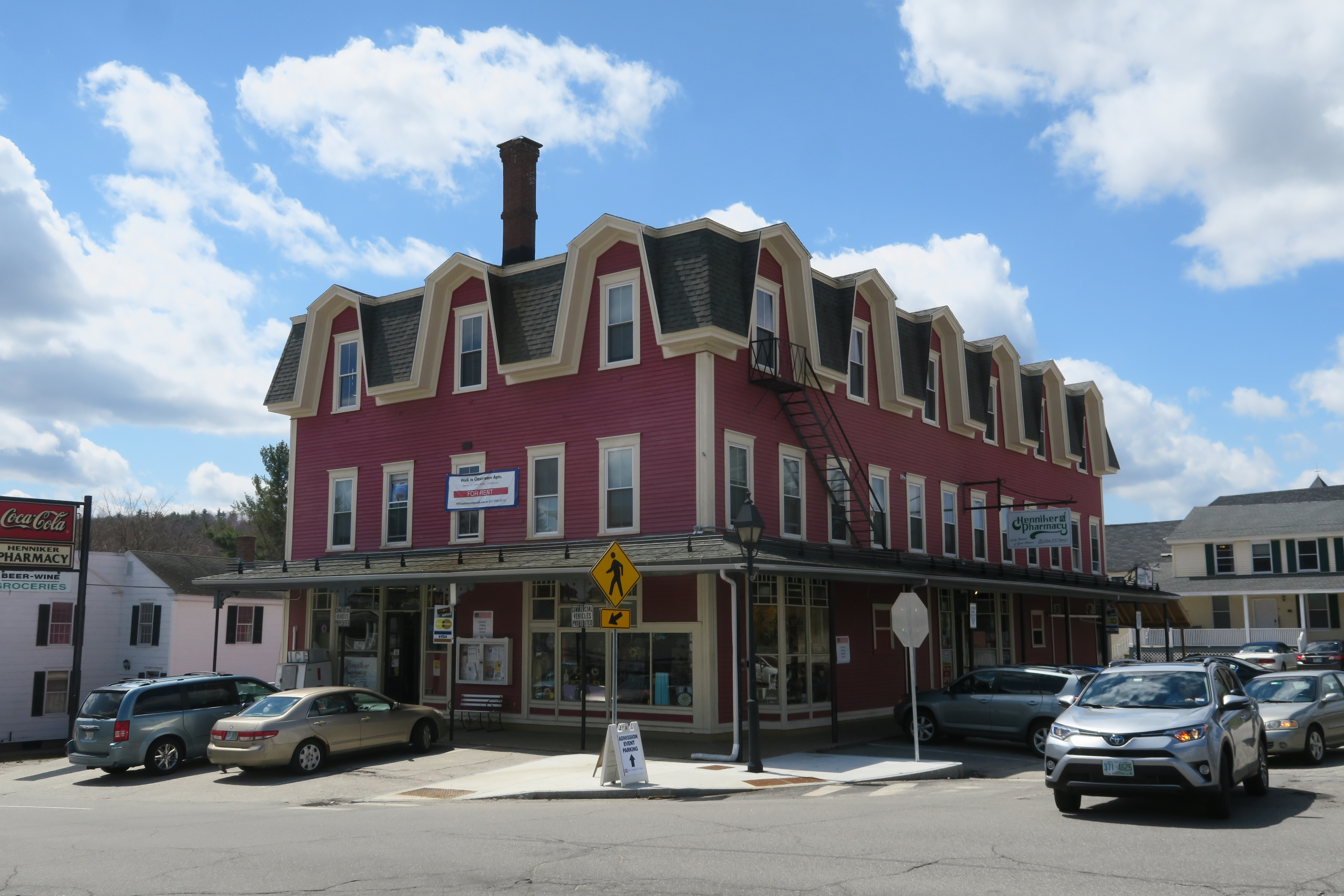
- Henniker Pharmacy

- Location within New Hampshire Location within the United States
- Coordinates: 43°10′53″N 71°49′08″W
- Country: United States
- State: New Hampshire
- County: Merrimack
- Town: Henniker

Area
  - Total: 1.42 sq mi (3.67 km^{2})
  - Land: 1.42 sq mi (3.67 km^{2})
  - Water: 0 sq mi (0.00 km^{2})
- Elevation: 436 ft (133 m)

Population (2020)
  - Total: 3,166
  - Density: 2,240/sq mi (863/km^{2})
- Time zone: UTC-5 (Eastern (EST))
  - Summer (DST): UTC-4 (EDT)
- ZIP code: 03242
- Area code: 603
- FIPS code: 33-35460
- GNIS feature ID: 2378070

Henniker is a census-designated place (CDP) and the main village in the town of Henniker, New Hampshire, United States. The population of the CDP was 3,166 at the 2020 census, out of 6,185 in the entire town. The CDP is the home to New England College.

== Geography ==
The CDP is in the center of the town of Henniker, primarily on the north side of the Contoocook River but with a small portion on the south side, comprising the campus of New England College. The CDP is bordered to the north by U.S. Route 202/New Hampshire Route 9 and by Amey Brook and to the south by the Contoocook River and an abandoned railroad grade. To the west, the CDP extends past The Oaks road.

New Hampshire Route 114 passes through the center of the village, leading northwest 9 miles (14 km) to Bradford and southeast 18 miles (29 km) to Goffstown. Routes 202/9 lead east 16 miles (26 km) to Concord, the state capital, and southwest 6 miles (10 km) to Hillsborough.

According to the U.S. Census Bureau, the Henniker CDP has a total area of 1.4 square miles (3.7 km^{2}), all of it recorded as land. The Contoocook River, flowing through the southern part of the CDP, is part of the Merrimack River watershed.

== Demographics ==
Historical population
Census	Pop.	Note	%±
1980	1,538		—
1990	1,693		10.1%
2000	1,627		−3.9%
2010	1,747		7.4%
2020	3,166		81.2%
U.S. Decennial Census

As of the census of 2010, there were 1,747 people, 556 households, and 269 families residing in the CDP. There were 586 housing units, of which 30, or 5.1%, were vacant. The racial makeup of the CDP was 93.0% white, 2.9% African American, 0.3% Native American, 1.7% Asian, 0.0% Pacific Islander, 0.8% some other race, and 1.3% from two or more races. 2.6% of the population were Hispanic or Latino of any race.

Of the 556 households in the CDP, 23.2% had children under the age of 18 living with them, 37.8% were headed by married couples living together, 7.0% had a female householder with no husband present, and 51.6% were non-families. 34.7% of all households were made up of individuals, and 11.5% were someone living alone who was 65 years of age or older. The average household size was 2.16, and the average family size was 2.78. 547 people (31.6% of the population) lived in group quarters such as dormitories, rather than households.

12.1% of residents in the CDP were under the age of 18, 44.5% were from age 18 to 24, 14.4% were from 25 to 44, 20.4% were from 45 to 64, and 8.5% were 65 years of age or older. The median age was 22.7 years. For every 100 females, there were 99.0 males. For every 100 females age 18 and over, there were 95.3 males.

For the period 2011–15, the estimated median annual income for a household was $62,889, and the median income for a family was $70,952. The per capita income for the CDP was $18,665.
