= Dodge Brook State Forest =

State forest in Sullivan County, New Hampshire

- Location within New Hampshire Location within the United States
- Location: Sullivan County, New Hampshire
- Nearest city: Lempster, New Hampshire
- Coordinates: 43°11′28″N 72°11′51″W
- Area: 226 acres (91 ha)
- Established: 1919
- Governing body: New Hampshire Department of Natural and Cultural Resources

Dodge Brook State Forest is a protected area in the town of Lempster, New Hampshire. It was purchased by the state in 1919 for reforestation. It is located on both sides of New Hampshire Route 10 with a larger parcel on the east side. The west parcel abuts Dodge Brook and has been home to stands of larch. The area was logged for spruce a couple years before it was originally purchased.

== See also ==
- List of New Hampshire state forests
