= Abbott State Forest =

State forest in Merrimack County, New Hampshire

- Location within New Hampshire Location within the United States
- Location: Merrimack County, New Hampshire
- Nearest city: Concord, NH
- Coordinates: 43°13′26″N 71°36′12″W
- Area: 35 acres (14 ha)
- Governing body: New Hampshire Department of Natural and Cultural Resources

Abbott State Forest is a 35-acre (14 ha) protected area located in Concord, New Hampshire, on the west side of Lake View Drive. It is bordered to the east, across Lake View Drive, by Penacook Lake water supply land. Abbott State Forest was reported to be producing white spruce seed in 1982.

== See also ==
- List of New Hampshire state forests
