= Mascoma State Forest =

State Forest in Grafton County, New Hampshire

Coordinates: 43°40′33″N 72°3′37″W

Mascoma State Forest is an area of forested land in Canaan in Grafton County, New Hampshire, on the west side of the Mascoma River. As of 2007, the tract covers 216 acres (87 ha). The forest borders the 900-acre Bear Pond Natural Area. Mascoma State Forest is managed by the state of New Hampshire Division of Forests and Lands.

== See also ==
- List of New Hampshire state forests
