= Edna Dean Proctor =

American poet

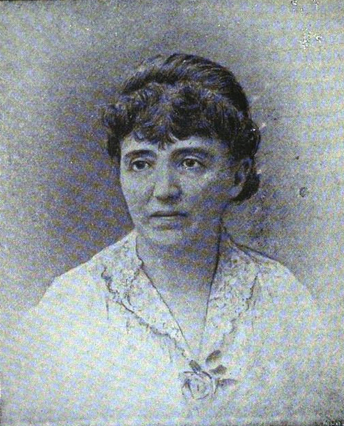
- Photo in The Woman's Story, 1889
- Born: September 18, 1829; Henniker, New Hampshire, U.S.
- Died: December 18, 1923 (aged 94); Framingham, Massachusetts
- Resting place: Edgell Grove Cemetery and Mausoleum, Framingham
- Education: Mount Holyoke Seminary
- Occupations: Author, poet
- Writing career
- Language: English

Edna Dean Proctor (September 18, 1829 – December 18, 1923) was an American writer and poet. Although she occasionally wrote short sketches and stories, poetry was her field. Proctor was characterized as a master of pathos. Early in life, Proctor was a writer of poetry, but not until the Civil War —which aroused the patriotic element within her— were her verses known around the country when her national poems became dear to soldiers. "The Stripes and Stars," written in April, 1861; "Compromise," inscribed to Congress, July 4, 1861; "Who's Ready?" written in July, 1862, were characterized as national anthems. Her battle songs were later published in a volume of collected poems by Hurd & Houghton in 1867. A later collection was also published. Being financially well-off, she wrote only when inspired to do so.

== Early life and education ==
Edna Dean Proctor was born September 18, 1829, (Note: According to Dole, in the Journal of Education (1919), several other biographical dictionaries record the birth date as October 10, 1838.) in Henniker, New Hampshire, her father's family having gone there from Essex County, Massachusetts. Of English ancestry, her father, John Proctor, was a native of Manchester, Massachusetts, and a descendant of John Proctor of England, who came to Ipswich, Massachusetts, in 1635, and whose eldest son, John Proctor, of Salem Village, was one of the victims in August 1692 of the Salem witchcraft delusion. The Goodhues, the Cogswells, the Appletons, and the Choates, of Essex County, were allied with this family. Her mother, Lucinda Gould of Henniker, represented the Goulds who had come from Massachusetts to the newer settlement and the Prescotts and Hiltons of Hampton and Exeter, New Hampshire. The Proctor family removed from Manchester to Henniker, and chose their home upon a hill overlooking the Contoocook River valley, the "pine-crowned hill" of her poem, "Contoocook River". Her brothers included Francis Proctor, E. Allen Proctor, and John C. Proctor.

With the exception of less than a year at Mount Holyoke Seminary (1847), her schools were those of her native village and of Concord, New Hampshire. Her early environment left a vivid impression and was an attributed force in her writing. She was thoroughly educated and trained; she often said that her best education was had in reading with her mother.

== Career ==
Several years of teaching in New Haven, Connecticut, and Brooklyn, New York, followed the completion of her education. In the latter city, she made a collection of extracts from the sermons of the Rev. Henry Ward Beecher —a book entitled Life Thoughts— which was very popular at home and abroad. Meanwhile, she was deeply interested in national affairs. Upon the day of John Brown's execution, her poem, "The Virginia Scaffold", was read at a large meeting in New York City, and its prophecy in the stanza:

"They may hang him on the gibbet; they may raise the victor's cry
When they see him darkly swinging like a speck against the sky;
Ah, the dying of a hero that the right may win its way
Is but sowing seed for harvest in a warm and mellow May!
Now his story shall be whispered by the firelight's evening glow,
And in fields of rice and cotton when the hot noon passed slow,
Till his name shall be a watchword from Missouri to the sea,
And his planting find its reaping in the Birthday of the Free!"

was fulfilled. During the American Civil War, her poems, "Who's Ready?" "Heroes," "The Mississippi," and others, were marked and influential. Her first small volume of verse was published by Hurd & Houghton in 1867. Then came two years of foreign travel, an outcome of which was A Russian Journey. Of this book, John Greenleaf Whittier wrote: — "I like it better than 'Eothen.'" Its chapter upon Sebastopol was said to have caused the neglected English cemeteries for veterans to receive better care.

Upon the completion of the railway to the Pacific in 1869, Proctor went with friends to California, and her letters, "From the Narrows to the Golden Gate," in the New York Independent, were pronounced by many the best account of the continental journey. A second collection of her poems was published by Houghton Mifflin Company in 1890, and two years later, the same house issued her Song of the Ancient People, which was inspired by the Hemenway Southwestern Archaeological Expedition. For the Columbian year of 1892, she wrote the poem, "Columbia's Banner," which was read and recited throughout the schools of the country on Columbus Day.

Proctor started a movement to make corn Columbia's emblem, and a resolution endorsing this idea was proposed. This was emphasized when Dr. Joseph Kossuth Dixon, the leader of the Rodman Wanamaker expedition to the Indians, returned from his trip after covering 25,000 miles (40,000 km) and visiting 189 tribes or sub-tribes of Native Americans. In September 1892, her song, "Columbia's Emblem," celebrating maize as the U.S. national floral emblem, appeared in The Century Magazine. This song was widely read and sung. As a reviewer said of it, "It has gone straight to the heart of the American people, ... a song which will be more potent than law to give the Indian corn its representative place in the republic." Most of the year 1897 she spent in Mexico and South America. In 1899, she wrote the poem, "The Hills are Home", for the first Old Home Week in New Hampshire, and in 1900, published her New Hampshire verse in a volume entitled The Mountain Maid.

Henry Wadsworth Longfellow used many of Proctor's poems in his Poems of Places, and expressed regret that her poem "Holy Russia" had not been written in time for his book, saying, "It would have been a splendid prelude to the volume." He greatly admired Proctor's Russian Journey (1872), as a book of surpassing interest. This was her second volume of prose, and it was written after a prolonged tour in Europe and a stay of many months in that country.

== Themes and reception ==
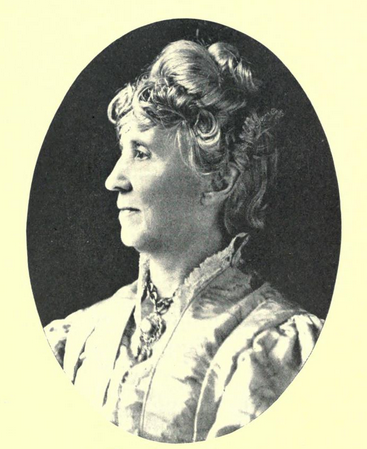
From a 1919 publication.

The wide horizon of her birthplace and early home—embracing Mount Kearsarge, Mount Monadnock, and the outlying ranges of the White Mountains, the forests, and the stream flowing through the meadows, made a picturesque landscape during her childhood, which was reflected again and again in her poems, and which may have been an inspiration to high themes.

Proctor's poetry is characterized by strength and fervor, by lofty thought and melodious numbers. Though so patriotic an American, her sympathies enabled her to understand the heart of other races. Of her "El Mahdi to the Tribes of the Soudan", Professor Frederick W. H. Myers, of Cambridge, England, said, "It is so Oriental I can hardly believe it was written by any one in the western world"; and James Darmesteter, professor in the College of France, wrote her from Constantinople, asking to include it in a new edition of his brochure of 1885, "The Mahdi". Her Song of the Ancient People—the Pueblos of our Southwest was characterized as having the dignity and pathos of a race that beholds all it revered and cherished slipping away. John Fiske, in his preface to the Song, said of it:— "As a rendering of Moqui-Zuni thought, it is a contribution of great and permanent value to American literature."

When her poem, "Heaven, Oh Lord, I Cannot Lose" appeared, it brought a wealth of responses from all over the U.S. Whittier pronounced the poem, "New Hampshire," one of the grandest produced in this country, and his verdict of her poems generally was that they had greater strength and a loftier and higher order of merit than those of any American female writer. Of her poem, "Oh, Loved and Lost," he said, "How sweet, tender and lovely the poem is! All our hearts were touched by it. It is a poem full of power and pathos, yet its shadows are radiant with a holy hope. I have read it over and over with deep interest and sympathy, and have found comfort and strength in it." He also said of her poem on "Burns," that it was so good, so true, so tender, yet so strong of thought that he hoped the bard himself might read it.

Yet her sympathies were not alone for matters of race and nation, but were warm and loyal in home and social life, expressing the power of her personality. She had sympathy with sorrow and suffering, as with "At Home," in which the death of Charley, a wounded soldier boy, within sight of his old home in New Hampshire, was told with thrilling presentability.

== Personal life ==
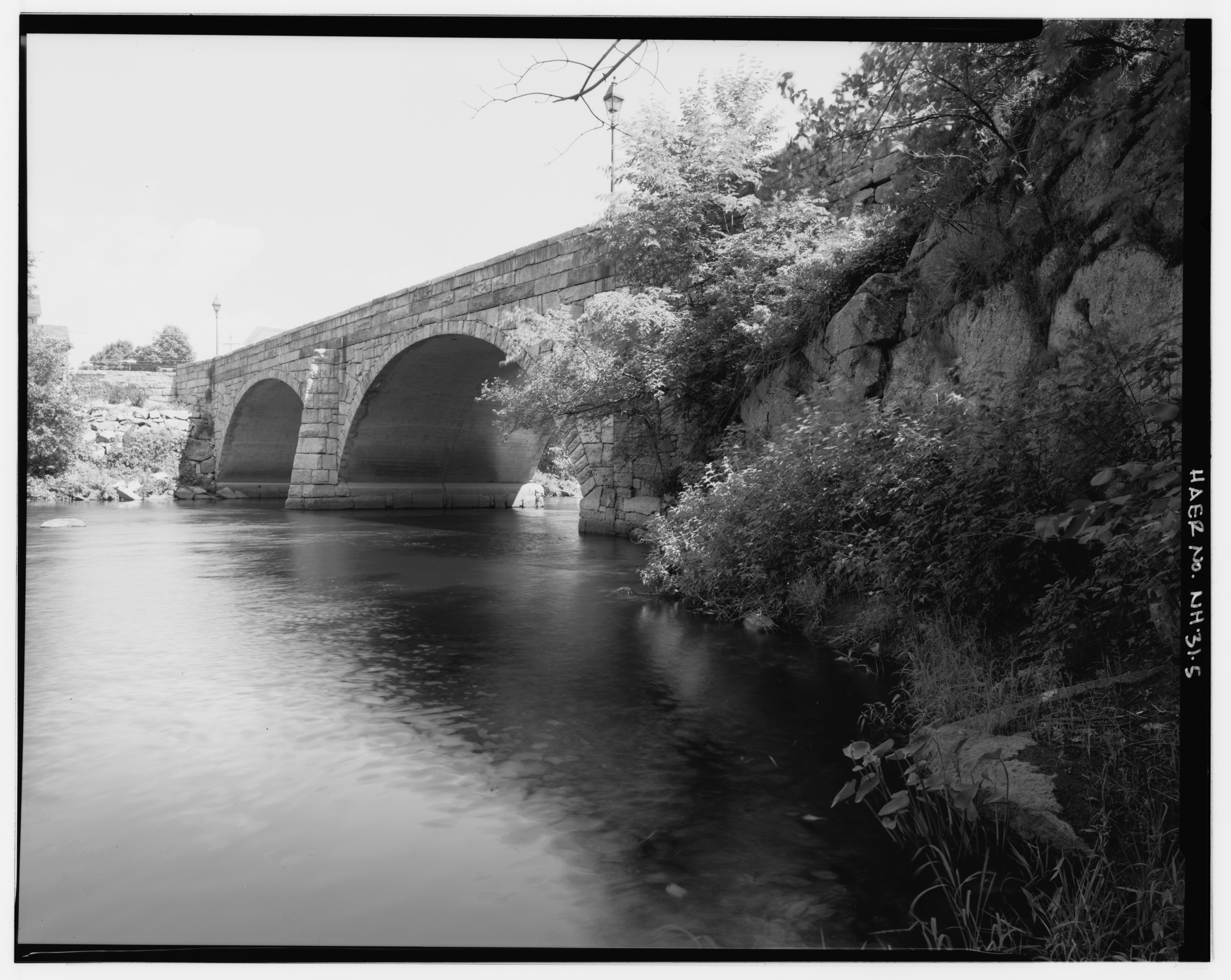
Edna Dean Proctor Bridge

Never married and childless, she died December 18, 1923, in Framingham, Massachusetts, and was buried at that city's Edgell Grove Cemetery and Mausoleum. The Edna Dean Proctor Bridge, which spans the Contoocook, at State Route 114, in Henniker, was named in her honor.

== Selected works ==
- [A] flower for Massachusetts
- New Hampshire : a poem
- Oh, the goal of the world is joy : words for the central movement of Chopin's Funeral march.
- Save the forests
- The president's proclamation : John Brown song (1861–65)
- Hymns and songs for the celebration of West-India emancipation, at Abington, Aug. 1, 1863. (1863)
- Poems (1867)
- A Russian journey (1871)
- O loved and lost! (1881)
- The Virginia mother (1892)
- The address for Columbus Day (1892)
- The song of the ancient people (1893)
- The Mountain Maid and Other Poems of New Hampshire (1900)
- Our national floral emblem (1901)
- Columbia's emblem (1901)
- Welcome (1902)
- Songs of America, and other poems (1905)
- To-morrow (1910)
- The Glory of Toil: And Other Poems (1916)
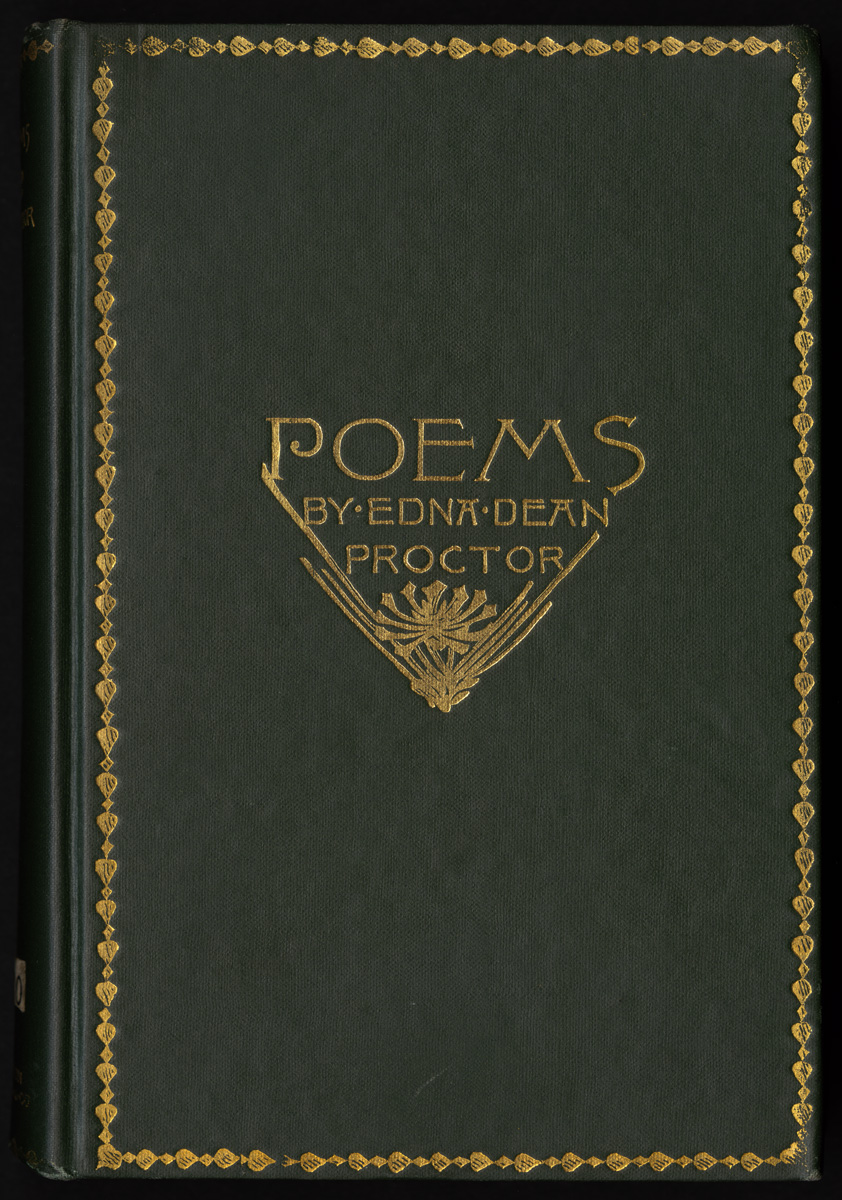
Poems (1890)

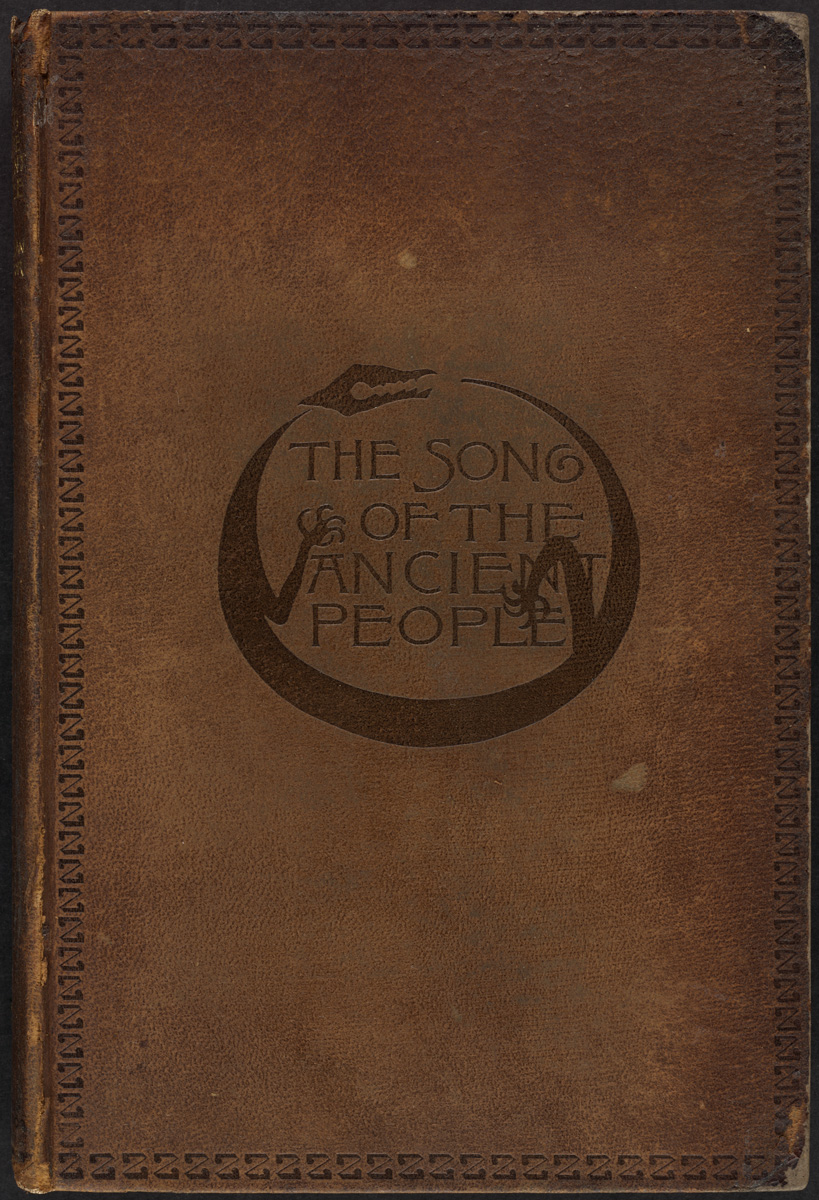
The song of the ancient people (1893)

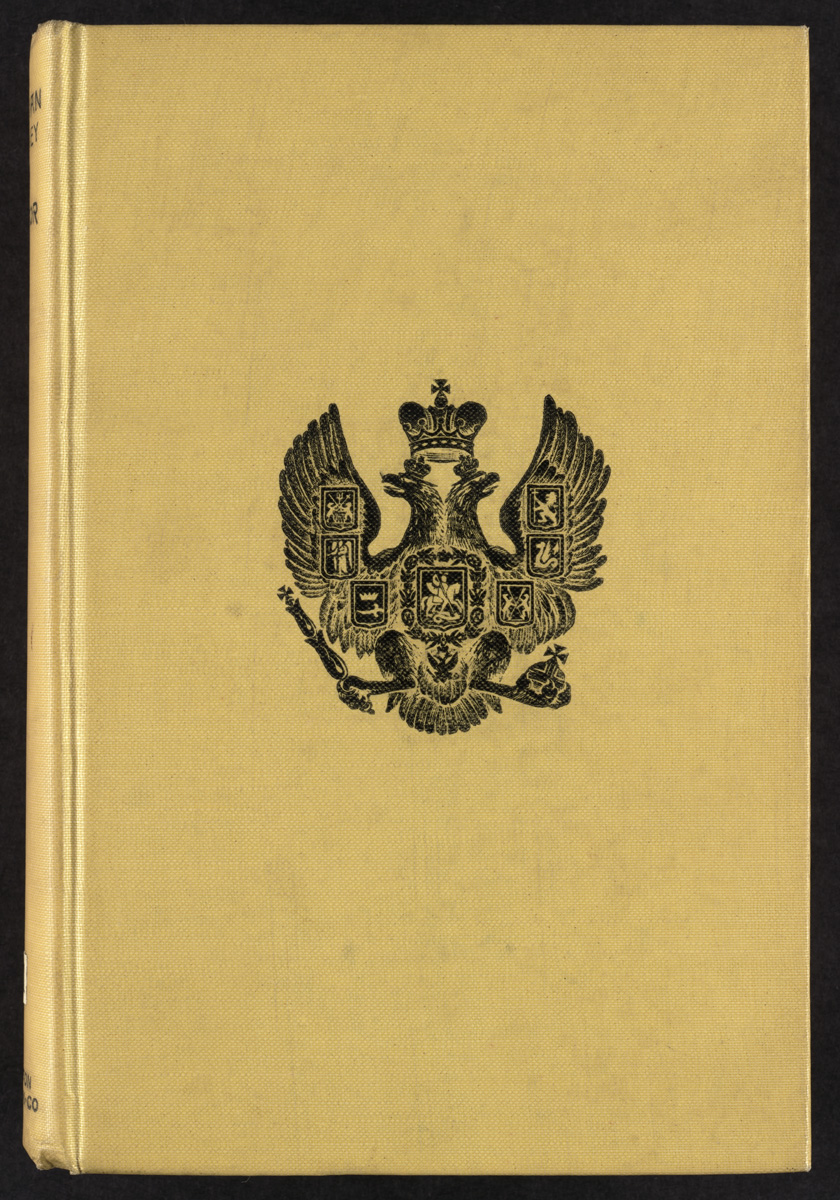
A Russian journey (1900)
