= Ballard State Forest =

State forest in Rockingham County, New Hampshire

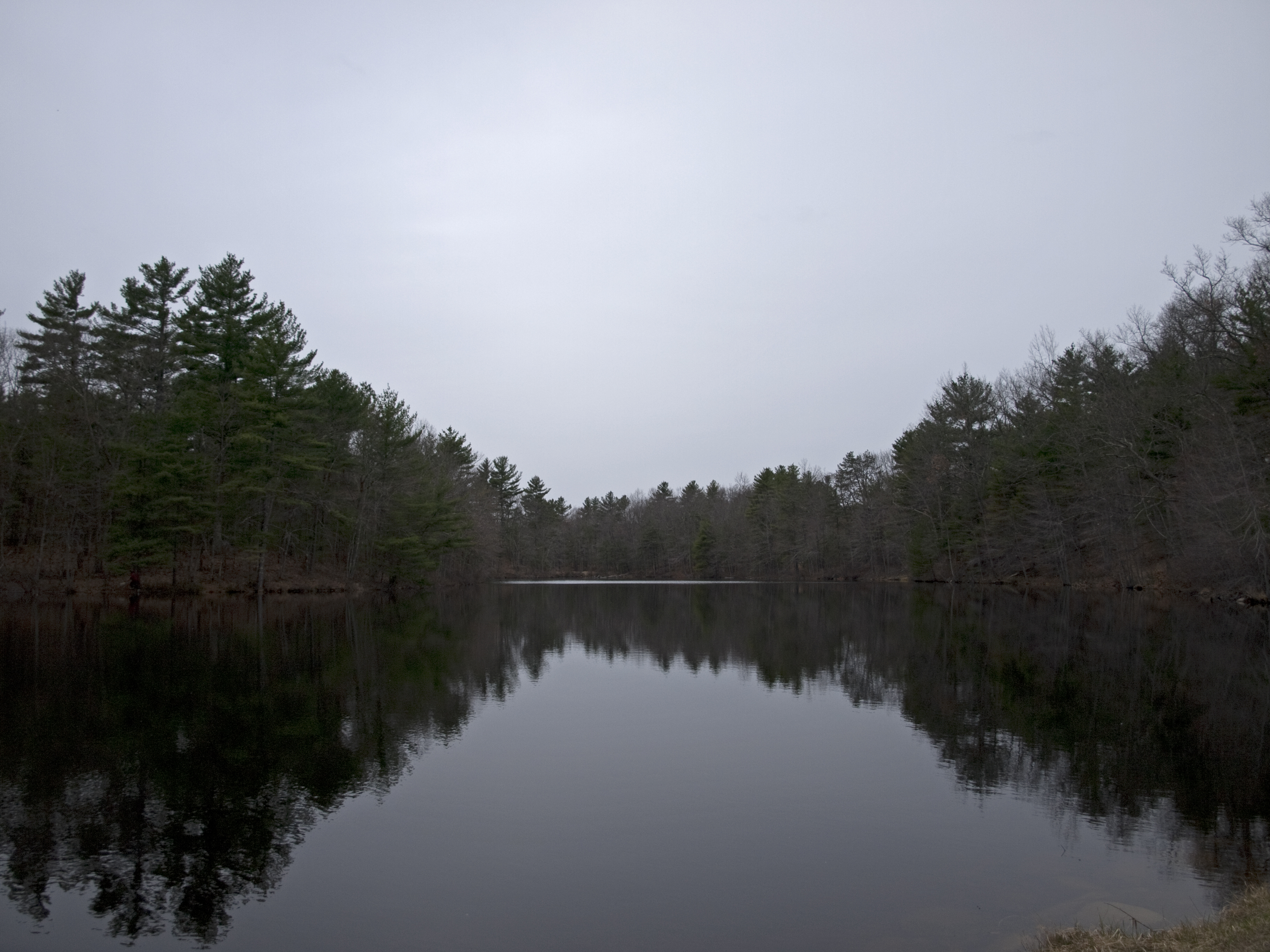
- Ballard Pond
- Interactive map of Ballard State Forest
- Type: State forest
- Location: Derry, Rockingham County, New Hampshire
- Coordinates: 42.8745°N 71.2392°W
- Area: 71 acres (0.29 km^{2})
- Operator: New Hampshire Division of Forests and Lands

Ballard State Forest is a state forest of New Hampshire located in Derry, Rockingham County, in the southeast part of the state. The area of the park is 71 acres (0.29 km^{2}). It includes the Taylor Mill Historic Site, an old sawmill, and Ballard Pond, which provides water for the mill. The forest is located on Island Pond Road, east of the downtown of Derry. The pond drains via Taylor Brook and Island Pond into the Spicket River, a tributary of the Merrimack River.

The name of the park is due to the former property owner, Ernest Ballard. In 1939, he bought the land. By that time, the original mill was scrapped, and Ballard bought a similar mill, and subsequently spent two years together with his wife restoring the mill and replacing missing parts. In 1953, he donated the mill and the land to the state of New Hampshire.
