= Chandler Reservation =

Protected area in New Hampshire, United States

Coordinates: 43°16′9″N 71°51′29″W

The Chandler Reservation is a 1,524-acre (617 ha) protected area owned by the town of Warner, New Hampshire, United States. The 400-acre (160 ha) Harriman Chandler State Forest borders it to the southwest. The reservation covers the northern end of the Mink Hills, with elevations ranging from 500 feet (150 m) above sea level in the north to 1,750 feet (530 m) on the crest of the range.

== History ==
A son of U.S. Senator William E. Chandler donated the original parcel, about 800 acres (320 ha), to the town in 1919. Additional property has been added over time. Since 1928 it has been managed by the Chandler Reservation Committee, an elected board. The area was logged at various times and in the 1930s the Civilian Conservation Corps was involved in creating pulpwood plantations and trails.

== See also ==
- List of New Hampshire state forests
