= Henniker Academy =

Historic school in New Hampshire

Coordinates: 43°10′51″N 71°49′25″W

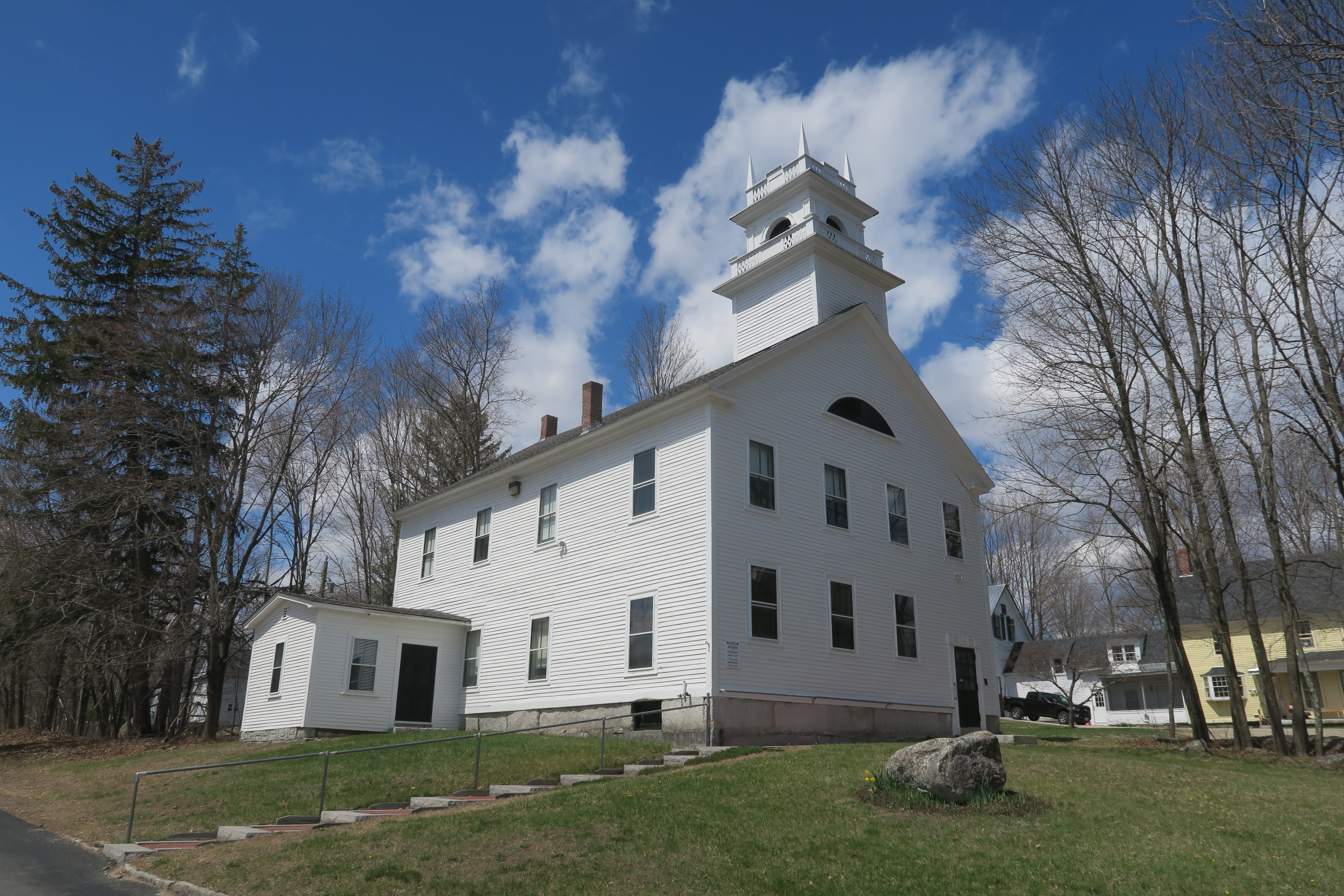
Henniker Academy

Henniker Academy was a school in Henniker, New Hampshire. The historic school building at 51 Maple Street in downtown Henniker is now home to the Henniker Historical Society. Alumni of Henniker Academy include abolitionist Richard Foster. The school's building was constructed by Horace Childs in 1836. William Martin Chase, later a justice of the Supreme Court of New Hampshire, taught at the school for a brief time.

== Notable people ==
- Lydia H. Tilton (1839–1915), educator, activist, journalist, poet, lyricist
- Richard Foster (1826–1901), abolitionist and officer of the Union Army
