= Agnew State Forest =

State forest in Coos County, New Hampshire

Coordinates: 44°20′57″N 71°27′15″W

Agnew State Forest is a 109-acre (44 ha) protected area in Jefferson, New Hampshire. It is bordered to the south and east by the White Mountain National Forest. Adding boulders to block vehicle access and raising trail levels with logs was discussed as part of a restoration plan for a nearby stream.

== See also ==
- List of New Hampshire state forests
