= WNEC-FM =

- Henniker, New Hampshire; United States
- Frequency: 91.7 MHz

Programming
- Format: College

Ownership
- Owner: New England College

History
- First air date: February 9, 1971
- Call sign meaning: New England College

Technical information
- Licensing authority: FCC
- Facility ID: 48405
- Class: A
- ERP: 120 watts
- HAAT: −64 meters (−210 ft)
- Transmitter coordinates: 43°10′34″N 71°49′22″W

Links
- Public license information: Public file; LMS
- Webcast: Listen live
- Website: wnecfm.org

WNEC-FM (91.7 FM) is a radio station licensed to serve Henniker, New Hampshire. The station is owned by New England College. It airs a college radio format.

The station has been assigned the WNEC-FM call letters by the Federal Communications Commission since November 2, 1970. The station signed on February 9, 1971.
