= William Thomas State Forest =

State forest in Merrimack County, New Hampshire

Coordinates: 43°32′44″N 71°43′59″W

William Thomas State Forest is a 1,660-acre (670 ha) state forest in the town of Hill, New Hampshire, in the United States. It is named for Harvard University class of 1945 graduate and B-24 Liberator pilot William H. Thomas Jr. who used his discharge pay to acquire 60 wooded acres and subsequently expanded his holdings to about 1,700. He had visions of a resort development, but retreated to the area in 1987 and donated the lands to the state of New Hampshire when he died in 2001. The area reportedly has some double track but no single track trails.

== See also ==
- List of New Hampshire state forests
