= Joe Sweeney (American politician) =

American politician

The Honorable Joseph Sweeney

Member of the New Hampshire House of Representatives from the Rockingham 25th district
- Incumbent
- Assumed office December 2012

Personal details
- Born: November 8, 1993 (age 32)
- Party: Republican
- Education: Salem High School
- Alma mater: University of New Hampshire
- Website: Official website

Joe Sweeney (born November 8, 1993) is a New Hampshire State Representative, elected in 2012. He is a Republican from Salem, representing Rockingham District 08. He was previously the Executive Director of the New Hampshire Republican State Committee.

In March, 2025, Rep. Sweeney proposed an amendment to the state's budget bill that would eliminate funding for the New Hampshire State Council on the Arts and the New Hampshire State Library.
