= New Hampshire Division of Historical Resources =

Government agency in the U.S. state of New Hampshire

New Hampshire Division of Historical Resources (DHR)

Agency overview
- Formed: 1985
- Preceding agency: State Historic Preservation Office (1974)
- Jurisdiction: New Hampshire, U.S.
- Headquarters: 19 Pillsbury Street; Concord, New Hampshire
- Agency executive: Benjamin Wilson, Director and State Historic Preservation Officer
- Parent agency: New Hampshire Department of Natural and Cultural Resources
- Website: www.nhdhr.dncr.nh.gov

The New Hampshire Division of Historical Resources (DHR) is a government agency of the U.S. state of New Hampshire. Benjamin Wilson is director of DHR and the State Historic Preservation Officer, while Sarah Stewart is commissioner of DHR's parent agency, the New Hampshire Department of Natural and Cultural Resources (DNCR). The main office of DHR is located in Concord.

== History ==
New Hampshire's Division of Historical Resources (DHR) began in 1974 as the State Historic Preservation Office (SHPO), authorized under the National Historic Preservation Act of 1966, which allowed for the creation of state historic preservation offices in each state. DHR assumed its current name in 1985. Since 2017, DHR has been part of the New Hampshire Department of Natural and Cultural Resources (DNCR).

== Function ==
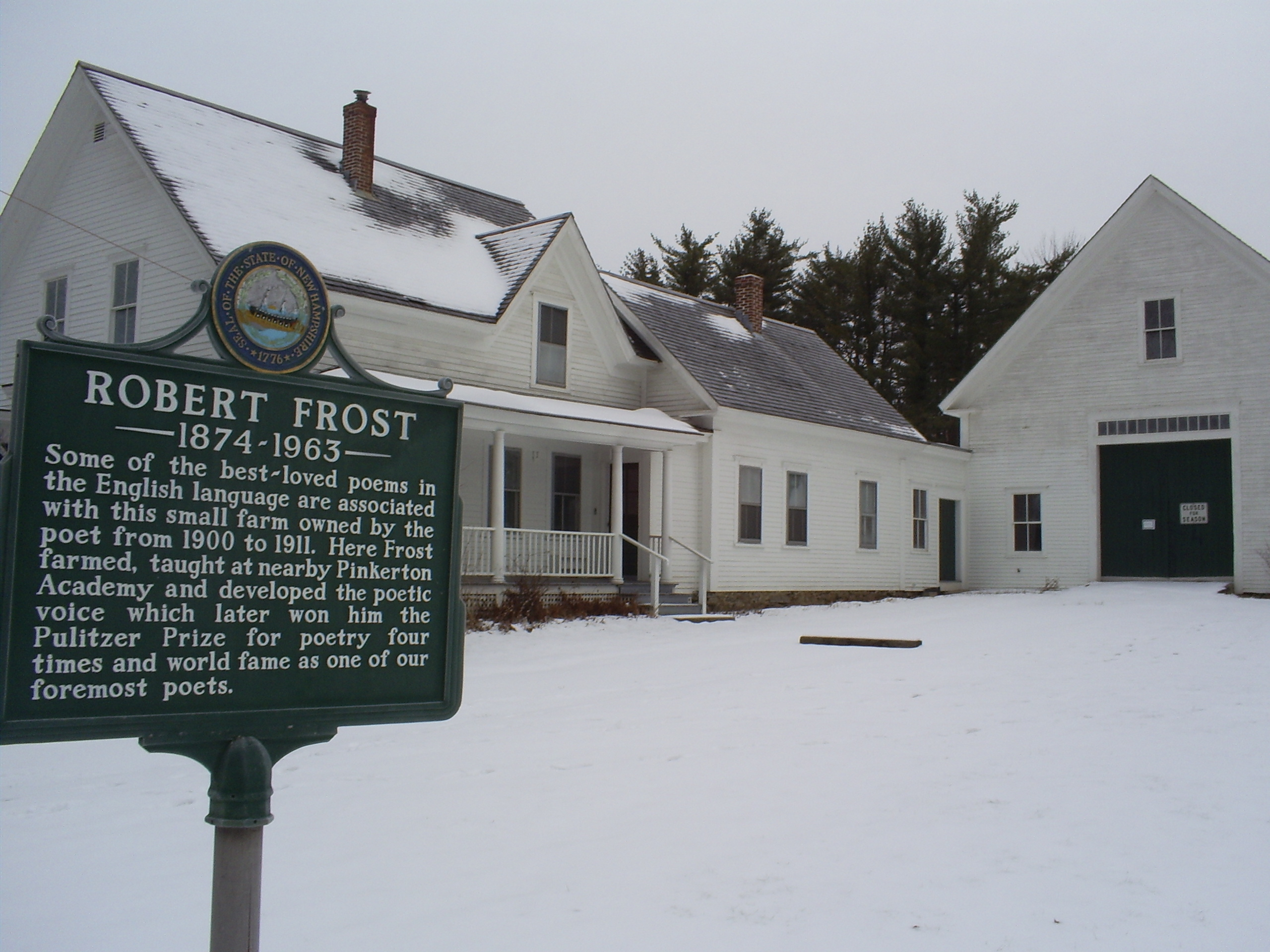
Example of a New Hampshire historical marker

DHR has a number of historic preservation functions defined under RSA 227-C, including:

- Undertaking a statewide survey to identify and document historic properties
- Preparing the state's historic preservation plan
- Providing information on historic properties within the state
- Accepting moneys for historic preservation from public and private sources
- Cooperating with other government agencies on historic properties and preservation objectives
- Coordinating activities with other government agencies on historic preservation
- Providing technical and financial assistance to public and private entities involved in historic preservation
- Stimulating public interest in historic preservation
- Developing an ongoing program of historical, architectural and archeological research and development
- Considering proposals to erect highway historical markers
- The archaeological discovery, investigation, analysis, and disposition of human remains

DHR's mission statement reads:

The mission of the Division of Historical Resources is to preserve and celebrate New Hampshire’s irreplaceable historic resources through programs and services that provide education, stewardship, and protection.

== Programs ==
Programs within DHR include:

- Archaeology
- Architectural History
- Certified Local Government Program (CLG)
- Enhanced Mapping & Management Information Tool (EMMIT)
- Historic Preservation Review & Compliance
- National Register of Historic Places
- New Hampshire Historical Highway Marker Program
- New Hampshire's First State House Project
- New Hampshire's Five Year Preservation Plan
- New Hampshire State Register of Historic Places
- Preservation Easements
- Project Archaeology
- State Conservation and Rescue Archaeology Program (SCRAP)
- Survey & Inventory
