= New England College =

Private college in Henniker, New Hampshire, US

- Motto: Dura duranda alta petenda
- Motto in English: "We work hard to achieve greater heights"
- Type: Private, non-profit
- Established: 1946; 80 years ago
- Academic affiliations: NHCUC
- Endowment: $33.65 million (2025)
- President: Wayne F. Lesperance, Jr.
- Students: 4,327 (fall 2020)
- Undergraduates: 1,776 (fall 2020)
- Postgraduates: 2,551 (fall 2020)
- Location: Henniker, New Hampshire, U.S. 43°10′34″N 71°49′20″W
- Campus: 220 acres (89 ha); Rural
- Colors: (Claret and navy)
- Nickname: Pilgrims
- Sporting affiliations: List: NCAA Division III; Conference of New England; New England Collegiate Conference; New England Hockey Conference; National Intercollegiate Rugby Association; Rugby Northeast; National Association of Collegiate Esports
- Mascot: Patty the Pilgrim
- Website: nec.edu
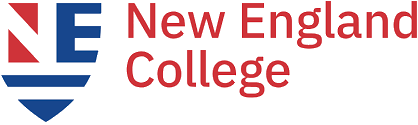

New England College (NEC) is a private liberal arts college in Henniker, New Hampshire, United States. It is accredited by the New England Commission of Higher Education. As of fall 2020, the college enrolled 4,327 students (1,776 undergraduate and 2,551 graduate).

== History ==
Founded in 1946, New England College was established to serve the needs of servicemen and women attending college on the G.I. Bill after World War II. In 1970, the college purchased the Tortington Park School for Girls in Arundel, in the English county of West Sussex. For a time, the school functioned as an extension campus for NEC students wishing to study abroad; at one point, the college even changed its logo to incorporate the flags of both countries. However, the Arundel campus closed in 1998.

The Institute of Art and Design (IAD) at New England College (NEC) originated from the merger of the New Hampshire Institute of Art (NHIA) into NEC in July 2019. Based in Manchester, NH, it was branded as the Institute of Art and Design at New England College. In 2023, NEC closed this Manchester campus, moving art programs to an Art Village at its main Henniker campus.

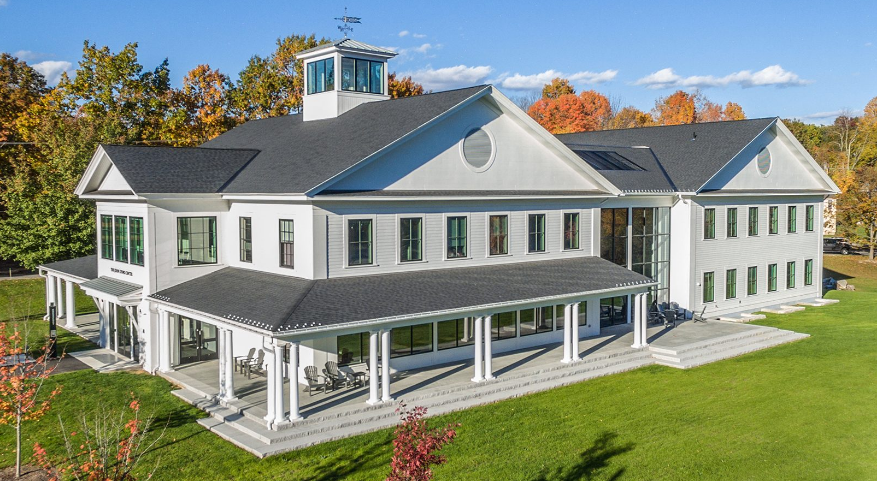
John Lyons Academic Center

== Campus ==
NEC is located in the small town of Henniker, New Hampshire, approximately 17 miles (27 km) west of Concord, the state's capital; 31 miles (50 km) northwest of Manchester; and 81 miles (130 km) northwest of Boston. The Contoocook River runs through the center of town and alongside the NEC campus. A covered bridge joins the main campus with roughly 20 acres (8.1 ha) of athletic fields.

The 225-acre (91 ha) campus, which has no distinct borders separating it from the town of Henniker, features 30 buildings, many of which feature white clapboard-style siding or brick mid-century architecture. It also features a yurt designed to connect students with nature, foster community, and support outdoor education. The campus is known throughout New England for its safety. Pats Peak ski resort lies just outside the village center, and many students participate in outdoor activities such as skiing, snowboarding, whitewater rafting, hiking in the White Mountains, and rock-climbing.

== Academics ==
New England College offers 9 associate degree programs, 37 bachelor's degree programs, 12 master's degree programs, and 2 doctoral degree programs with multiple tracks. The programs are divided into four divisions: Art & Design, Humanities, Management & the Science, Health & Education Division. The college is accredited by the New England Commission of Higher Education, and all programs offered by New England College are included in this regional accreditation. The school's business programs are accredited by the Accreditation Council for Business Schools and Programs (ACBSP). Additionally, the school's Teacher Education Program (including endorsements in Physical Education, Special Education, Elementary Education, and Secondary Education) is approved by the New Hampshire Department of Education. Currently, the school employs 40 full-time faculty members and holds a 14:1 student-to-faculty ratio.

U.S. News & World Report ranks New England College #131–#171 in "Regional Universities – North, Tier 2." New England College ranks tied for 173 on the U.S. News & World Report list for "Best Online Bachelor's Programs".

In 2025, New England College (NEC) received designation as a Purple Heart College in recognition of its ongoing commitment to honoring and supporting America's service members who have been wounded or killed in combat.

== Student life ==
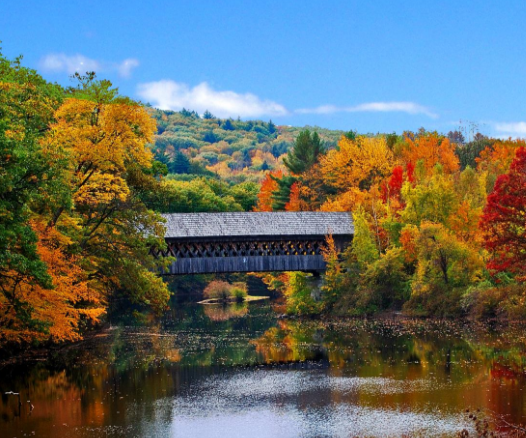
Henniker Bridge connects NEC campus with its athletic fields, and is listed on the New Hampshire State Register of Historic Places.

The college is home to 27 student organizations, including various student government committees and Kappa Delta Phi NAS. There were formerly five chapters of Greek life: two sororities (Kappa Phi Sigma and Phi Sigma Sigma) and three fraternities (Sigma Phi Delta, Lambda Epsilon Delta, and Sigma Alpha Beta), but these organizations were dissolved by the late 2000s. Students also publish an award-winning campus newspaper called The New Englander and operate a campus-based radio station, WNEC-FM, and a TV Studio NEC-TV with live shows that air Thursdays at 2:30 p.m. on YouTube (@NewEnglandCollegeNECTV), with additional content available on Instagram (@nec.tv).

New England College opened an esports arena in January 2019. This club sport at NEC is closely connected to several academic programs, such as Game and Digital Media Design and programs focusing on art, writing, marketing, graphic or website design, science, and strategy.

=== Diversity ===
NEC has been publicly recognized by Time magazine as one of the top 25 colleges in the nation which have diversified their student body the most since 1990.

== Athletics ==
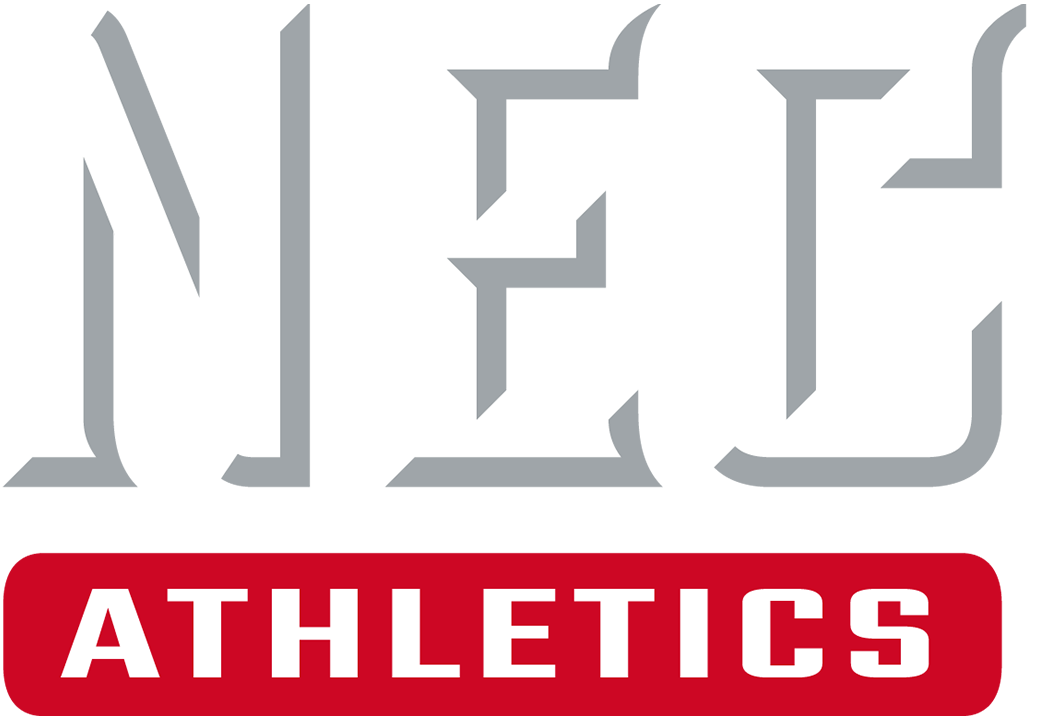
New England Pilgrims wordmark

New England College's Pilgrims compete in 23 intercollegiate NCAA Division III athletic sports, including soccer, lacrosse, ice hockey, field hockey, softball, baseball, basketball, cross-country, football, wrestling, volleyball, rugby, cheerleading, track and field, and alpine skiing. The Pilgrims compete in the Great Northeast Athletic Conference (GNAC).

They were previously members of the North Atlantic Conference (NAC) from 2011 to 2018 and the Commonwealth Coast Conference (CCC) from 1989 to 2011.

In 2023, NEC announced the official reopening of their varsity football program after a 50-year hiatus. They will compete at the NCAA Division III level. The New England College Pilgrims football team will be coached by Kevin Kelly and participate in the Conference of New England

== Notable alumni ==
- Jon Gould (1953-1986), studio executive and producer at Paramount Pictures of Raiders of the Lost Ark (1981) and Flashdance (1983)
- Geena Davis (b. 1956), Academy Award-winning actress who attended her freshman year at NEC before transferring to Boston University
- Ira Joe Fisher (b. 1947), meteorologist and former weather reporter for The Saturday Early Show
- Mariela Griffor (b. 1961), poet and diplomat
- Siad Haji (b. 1999), professional soccer player who attended his freshman year at NEC before transferring to Virginia Commonwealth University
- Laura Harris Hales, writer, historian, and podcaster
- Mark Lindquist (b. 1949), sculptor
- Maureen Mooney, New Hampshire State Representative, attorney, and educator
- Allen Steele (b. 1958), science fiction author
- Wallace Stickney (1934–2019), director of the Federal Emergency Management Agency (FEMA) under President George H. W. Bush
- Steven Zirnkilton (b. 1958), voice actor, narrator, radio show host, and politician
