= Blue Job Mountain =

Mountain in the United States of America

- Summit fire tower in 2024

Highest point
- Elevation: 1,357 ft (414 m) NGVD 29
- Coordinates: 43°19′53″N 71°06′54″W

Geography
- Location within New Hampshire
- Location: Strafford County, New Hampshire, U.S.
- Topo map: USGS Baxter Lake

Blue Job Mountain State Forest
- Interactive map of Blue Job Mountain State Forest
- Type: State forest
- Location: Farmington, Strafford County, New Hampshire
- Area: 284 acres (1.15 km^{2})
- Operator: New Hampshire Division of Forests and Lands

Blue Job Mountain (pronounced /dʒoʊb/ Jobe) is a mountain in Farmington, New Hampshire. It has a fire tower at the summit, and numerous trails, most commonly accessed from First Crown Point Road in neighboring Strafford, crisscross the mountain.

Blue Job Mountain State Forest occupies 284 acres (115 ha) around the summit.
