= New Hampshire State Council on the Arts =

Government agency in the U.S. state of New Hampshire

Agency overview
- Preceding agency: State Arts Council (1965)
- Jurisdiction: New Hampshire
- Headquarters: 172 Pembroke Road; Concord, New Hampshire
- Annual budget: $150,000 (FY 2026)
- Agency executive: Adele Sicilia, Director
- Parent agency: New Hampshire Department of Natural and Cultural Resources
- Website: www.nharts.dncr.nh.gov

The New Hampshire State Council on the Arts is a government agency of the U.S. state of New Hampshire. Adele Sicilia is the agency's director, while Adam J. Crepeau is interim commissioner of the parent agency, the New Hampshire Department of Natural and Cultural Resources. The main office of the agency is located in Concord.

== History ==
New Hampshire formed a State Arts Council, the state's first arts agency, on June 28, 1965. The council is authorized via RSA 19-A, "to insure that the role of the arts in the life of our communities will continue to grow and will play an ever more significant part in the welfare and educational experience of our citizens."

In March, 2025, Rep. Joseph Sweeney proposed an amendment to the state's budget bill that would eliminate funding for the Arts Council, as well as for the New Hampshire State Library. The FY 2026 budget for the New Hampshire State Council on the Arts was significantly reduced from $1.4 million to $150,000 to meet revenue constraints. As a part of this reduction, the Granite Patron of the Arts Fund was established, allowing businesses to make donations in exchange for a 50% tax credit against the Business Profits Tax and the Business Enterprise Tax.

== Function ==
The mission of the council is "to promote the arts to protect and enrich New Hampshire's unique quality of life." The council works in partnership with the National Endowment for the Arts, the New England Foundation for the Arts, and the National Assembly of State Arts Agencies. There is a 15-member advisory council, appointed by the Governor of New Hampshire.

The three main goals of the agency are:

1) Engage the arts to benefit people and communities throughout New Hampshire.
2) Strengthen New Hampshire's artists and arts organizations.
3) Expand opportunities to learn in and through the arts.

The council awards grants to "serve as a public investment in communities throughout the state." In fiscal year 2018, the council awarded 103 grants, funding 68 through state funds and 35 through federal funds, totaling $555,730.

The council also provides recommendation to the Governor and Executive Council for the state's honorary artist laureate position.
