= New Hampshire State Library =

Government agency in the U.S. state of New Hampshire

Coordinates: 43°12′26″N 71°32′19″W

- State Library logo

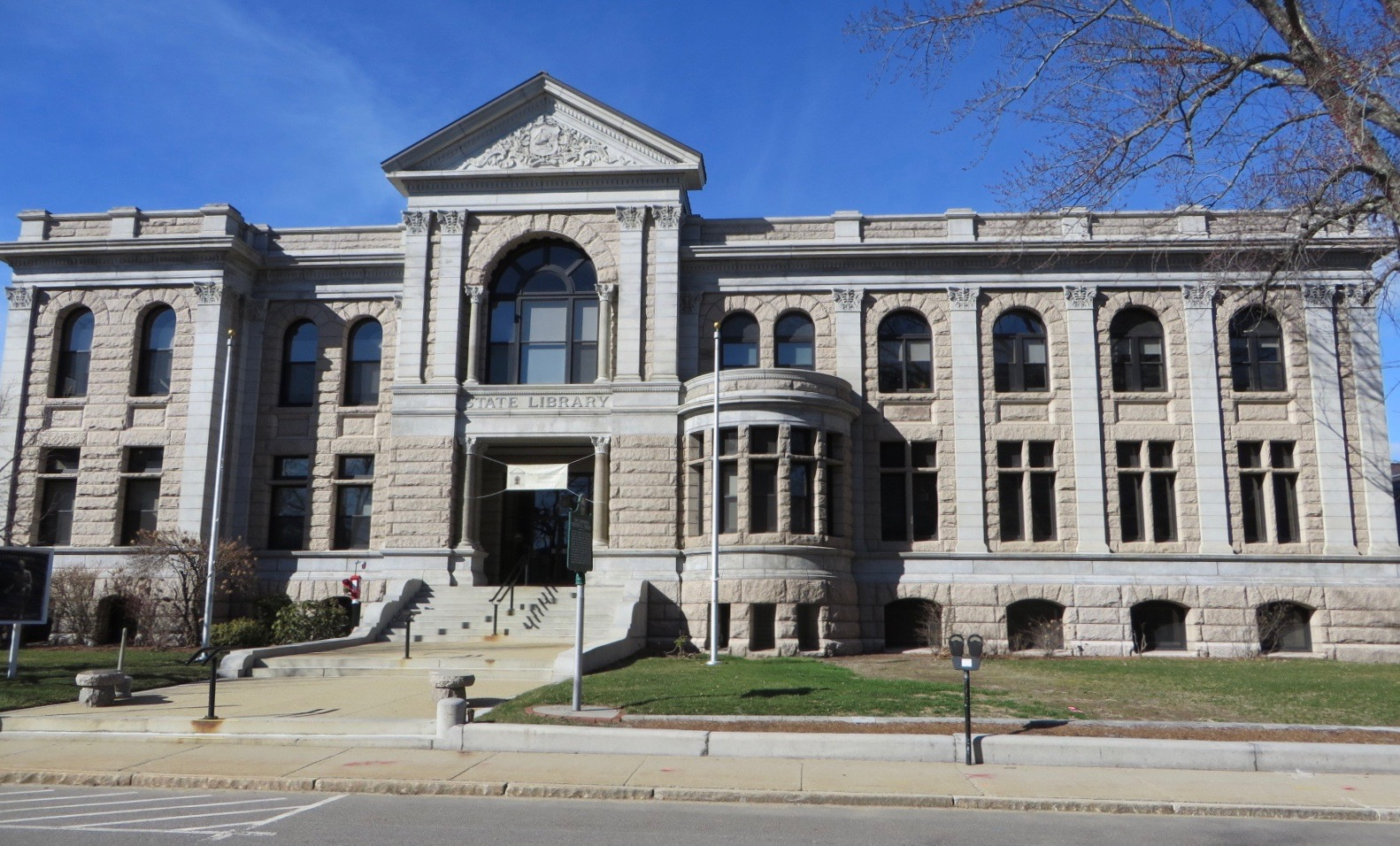
- State Library building in Concord

Agency overview
- Formed: January 25, 1717
- Jurisdiction: New Hampshire
- Headquarters: 20 Park Street; Concord, New Hampshire
- Agency executives: Michael York, State Librarian; Melinda Atwood, Administrator of Library Operations
- Parent agency: New Hampshire Department of Natural and Cultural Resources
- Website: www.nhsl.dncr.nh.gov

The New Hampshire State Library is a library in Concord, New Hampshire, and also a state agency, overseen since 2017 by the New Hampshire Department of Natural and Cultural Resources (DNCR). The physical building is located across the street from the New Hampshire State House.

== History ==
The library's origins pre-date the United States: "The beginnings of the State Library were in 1717 and it is generally considered to be the oldest such institution in the United States." Originally housed in Portsmouth, the state library has been located in Concord since 1808. The current building opened in 1895, and also housed the New Hampshire Supreme Court until 1970.

In March, 2025, Rep. Joseph Sweeney (American politician) proposed an amendment to the state's budget bill that would eliminate funding for the library, as well as for the New Hampshire State Council on the Arts.

== See also ==
- List of libraries in the United States
