= Craney Hill State Forest =

State forest in Merrimack County, New Hampshire

Coordinates: 43°10′34″N 71°46′2″W

- Location: Merrimack County, New Hampshire
- Nearest city: Henniker, New Hampshire
- Area: 21 acres (8.5 ha)
- Governing body: New Hampshire Department of Natural and Cultural Resources

Craney Hill State Forest is in Henniker, New Hampshire, United States. It comprises 21 acres (8.5 ha) along the south side of Old Concord Road and is also bordered by gravel pits on two sides and private land.

== See also ==
- List of New Hampshire state forests
