= Wallace Stickney =

American civil servant (1934–2019)

Wally Stickney

Director of the Federal Emergency Management Agency
- In office August 1990 – January 20, 1993
- President: George H. W. Bush
- Preceded by: Jerry Jennings (acting)
- Succeeded by: William Tidball (acting)

Personal details
- Born: Wallace Elmer Stickney; November 24, 1934 Salem, New Hampshire, U.S.
- Died: June 27, 2019 (aged 84)
- Party: Republican
- Education: New England College (BA); Northeastern University (MS); Harvard University (MPA)

Wallace Elmer "Wally" Stickney (November 24, 1934 – June 27, 2019) was an American civil servant, most prominently as the director of the Federal Emergency Management Agency (FEMA) under President George H. W. Bush.

Stickney was born in Salem, New Hampshire. He graduated from New England College in 1959 (B.S.) and received master's degrees from Northeastern University (M.S.) and Harvard University (M.P.A.). He died on June 27, 2019, after a brief illness.

In 1965, Stickney was unanimously chosen as the first professional town engineer for Salem. He also served on the Southern Rockingham Regional Planning Commission. As Salem's town engineer, Stickney was instrumental in the planning of a new municipal core centered on Geremonty Drive. This included a new high school, a municipal office building, a new wastewater treatment plant, and three elementary schools. He moved to the US Department of the Interior water division in 1968 and later became a staff environmental engineer at the U.S. Environmental Protection Agency. He eventually rose to the position of Environmental and Economic Office Director for U.S. Environmental Protection Agency Region One in Boston, Massachusetts.

From 1983 to 1985, he served as special assistant for environmental affairs to then-Governor of New Hampshire, John H. Sununu. In 1985, he was named as the first commissioner of the newly organized New Hampshire Department of Transportation. He played a key role in the ending a three-decade battle over the completion of Interstate 93 through Franconia Notch State Park. This was resolved through the construction of the Franconia Notch Parkway, a narrow, speed-controlled 8-mile scenic parkway that required a special amendment to the standards applied across the rest of the U.S. interstate system.

He was nominated to lead FEMA in 1990. At the time, a significant portion of FEMA's budget dealt with Cold War issues of nuclear survivability. Stickney was later quoted "The evil empire had crumbled, the Warsaw Pact nations were becoming independent, and it became clear that the most difficult situation we would have to handle wouldn't be a maximum lay-down but a partial one, in which only a part of the country was knocked out," said Stickney. "It was a time of transition on the world scene." Stickney faced considerable resistance in his efforts to transform FEMA from a secretive organization focused on doomsday preparations into one capable of effectively responding to natural disasters. According to Stickney, his efforts "...met with the full resistance of the security industry, as well as what might even be called a 'Security Cult' -- people who believed strongly in what they'd been doing for ten years and longer. There are many ways to make things move slowly when there are a lot of people working against it, and only a few trying to make it happen."

After his service with FEMA, Stickney co-founded Municipal Resources, Inc. a consulting firm that provided professional, technical, and managerial services to local governments in New England, specializing in community and economic development, fire and emergency management services, public works and transportation. In this capacity, he held the positions of interim fire chief of Hudson, New Hampshire; interim public works director of the city of Lebanon, New Hampshire; and interim director of Lebanon's airport.

Political offices
| Preceded by Jerry Jennings; Acting | Director of the Federal Emergency Management Agency; 1990–1993 | Succeeded by William Tidball; Acting |
