= Lydia H. Tilton =

American journalist and temperance worker

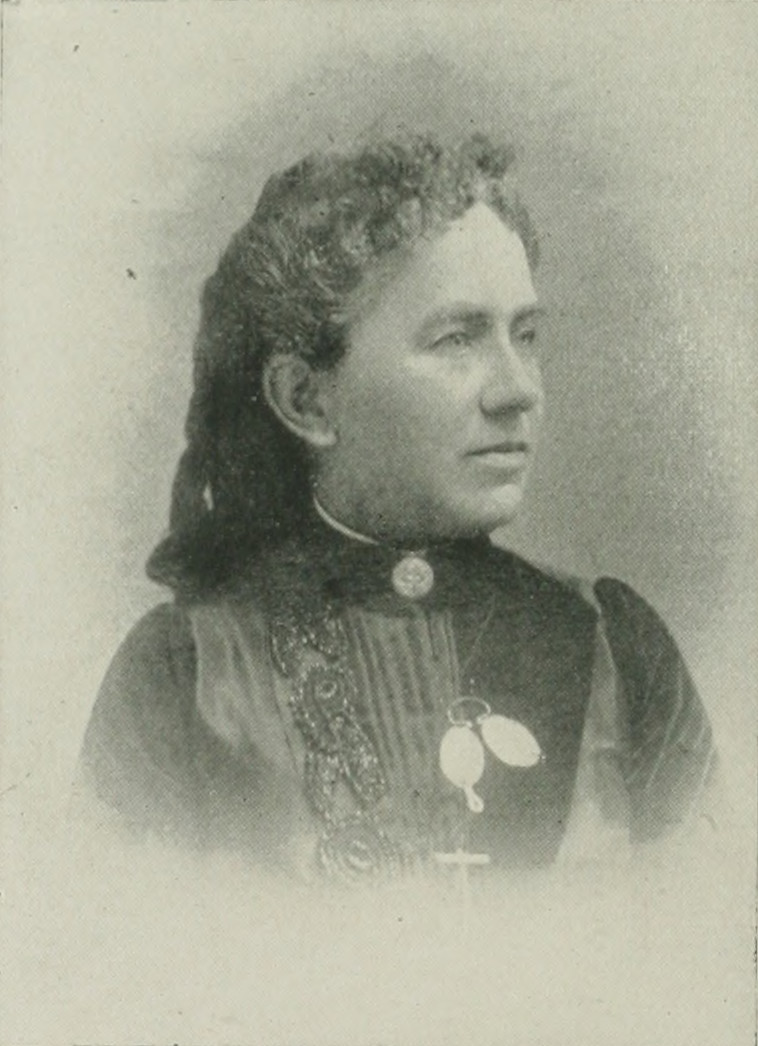
- "A Woman of the Century"
- Born: Lydia Priscilla Heath; July 10, 1839; Tuftonboro, New Hampshire, U.S.
- Died: July 26, 1915 (aged 76); Washington, D.C.
- Resting place: Arlington National Cemetery
- Education: New Hampshire Conference Seminary
- Occupations: journalist; temperance activist; teacher; poet; lyricist
- Spouse: Rufus Newell Tilton (m. 1866; died 1901)
- Children: 2

Lydia H. Tilton (née, Heath; July 10, 1839 – July 26, 1915) was an American journalist and temperance worker. Also a poet, she was well known in literary circles. "Old Glory", lyrics by Tilton, set to the tune of "Dixie", was the national song of the Daughters of the American Revolution (D.A.R.).

== Early life and education ==
Lydia Priscilla Heath was born in Tuftonboro, New Hampshire, July 10, 1839. Her mother was Chloe (Blake) Heath (1800–1877). Her father was Abel Heath (1797–1852), a minister of the Methodist Episcopal Church, who was known to the Methodists throughout New England. He died during a Session of Conference in Nashua, New Hampshire, in 1852, leaving a widow and eight children. From this time, Lydia resided in Manchester, New Hampshire.

She was educated in the public schools of Manchester, and in the New Hampshire Conference Seminary.

== Career ==
Tilton taught in the latter school, and in Henniker Academy.

In Manchester, on December 6, 1866, she married Rufus Newell Tilton (1840–1901), and thereafter resided in Washington, D.C., as Mr. Tilton worked for the U.S. Treasury Department. They had two daughters, Emma (b. 1872) and Anna (b. 1874).

As a newspaper correspondent and as a writer of occasional poems, Tilton developed a large circle of literary friends.

Tilton served as the Corresponding Secretary and the Superintendent of Temperance Instruction of the Non-Partisan National Woman's Christian Temperance Union in Washington, D.C. Subsequently, she served as the national legislative secretary of the Non-Partisan National Woman's Christian Temperance Union, being active in its work.

== Death ==
Lydia H. Tilton died in Washington, D.C., July 26, 1915. Burial was at Arlington National Cemetery.

== Selected works ==
=== Poems ===
- "All Things" (1883)
- "The Bridal Wreath" (1883)
- "Furnishing the House" (1883)
- "The Kiss at the Door" (1883)
- "Words" (1895)
- "All Things" (1895)
- "The Sparrows" (1895)

=== Songs ===
- "Old Glory" (lyrics)
