= Alton Bay State Forest =

State forest in Belknap County, New Hampshire

Coordinates: 43°28′13″N 71°14′47″W

Alton Bay State Forest is a 210-acre (85 ha) protected area in Alton, New Hampshire. It was acquired in 1915. It is bordered to the east by the village of Alton Bay at the south end of Lake Winnipesaukee.

== See also ==
- List of New Hampshire state forests
