= Urban Forestry Center =

Forest

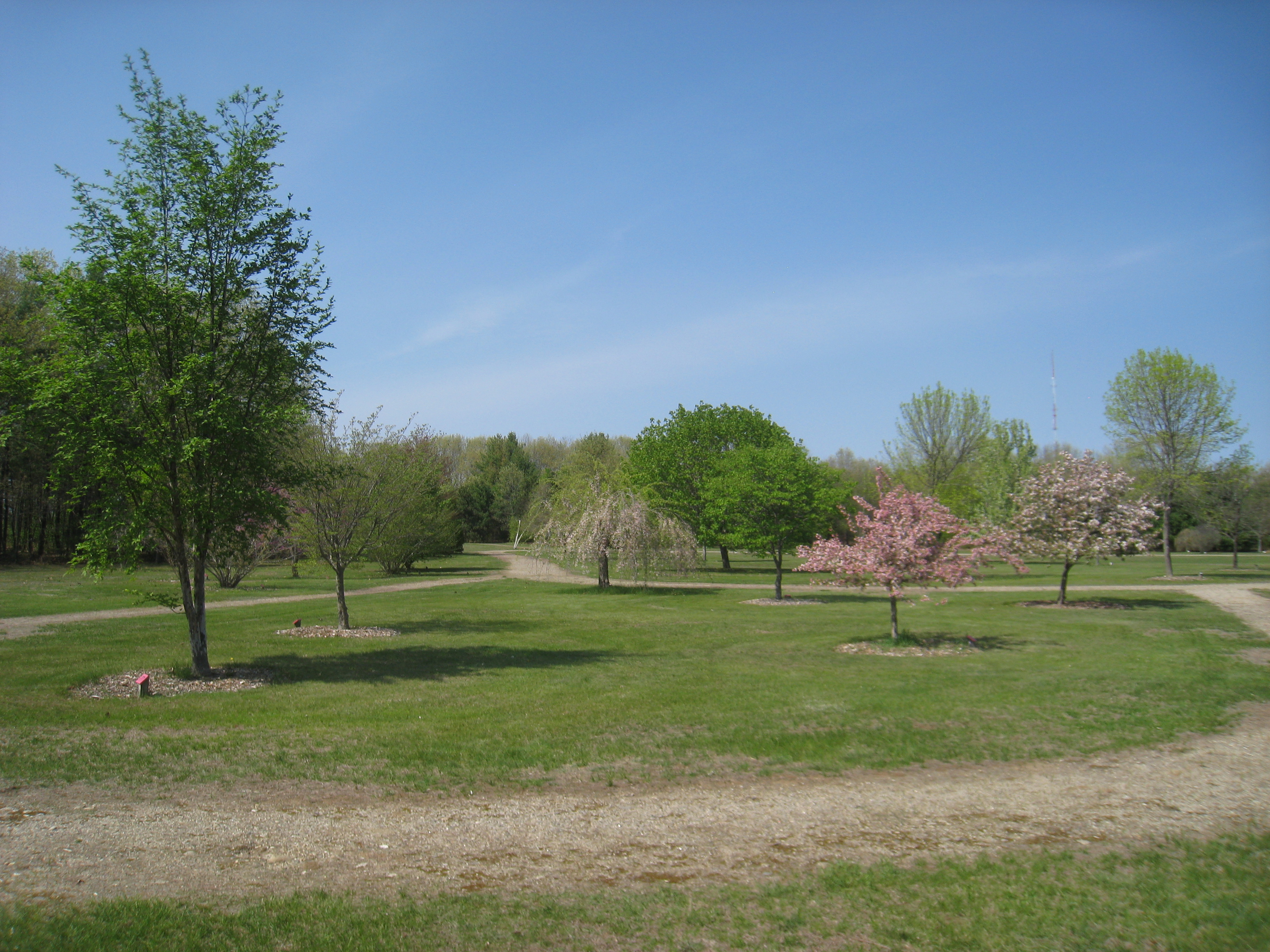
- Arboretum at the Urban Forestry Center
- Interactive map of Urban Forestry Center
- Location: 45 Elwyn Road, Portsmouth, Rockingham County, New Hampshire
- Coordinates: 43.0441°N 70.7688°W
- Area: 182 acres (0.74 km^{2})
- Created: 1976
- Operator: New Hampshire Division of Forests and Lands
- Website: Urban Forestry Center

The Urban Forestry Center is a 182-acre (74 ha) state-owned forest and environmental education center in the city of Portsmouth, New Hampshire. There are several buildings, garden demonstration areas, and trails which are used for walking, cross-country skiing, and snowshoeing.

The Center is used as a tree farm and forestry education center. The property includes a 95-acre (38 ha) forest management area, a red pine and a spruce plantation, and an arboretum for tree identification. There are self-guided trails through the woodlands systems.
