= Jacob Rice (New Hampshire politician) =

American politician

Member of the New Hampshire House of Representatives from the Henniker, Merrimack district
- In office 1828–1829

Personal details
- Born: January 23, 1787 Henniker, New Hampshire
- Died: April 14, 1879 (aged 92) Henniker, New Hampshire
- Spouse: Lovisa Howe (1787-1867)
- Parent(s): Elijah Rice (1750-1805); Margaret (Patterson) Rice
- Profession: Farmer, state legislator

Jacob Rice (1787–1879) was a farmer from Henniker, New Hampshire and member of the New Hampshire House of Representatives, serving from 1828 to 1829.

== Personal background and family relations ==
Jacob Rice was born in Henniker, New Hampshire on 23 January 1787 to Elijah Rice and Margaret (Patterson) Rice. He married Lovisa Howe and was a farmer in Henniker. In 1828 he was elected to the New Hampshire House of Representatives where he served one two-year term. Rice died at his home in Henniker on 14 April 1879. Jacob Rice was a direct descendant of Edmund Rice, an early immigrant to Massachusetts Bay Colony, as follows:

- Jacob Rice, son of
- Elijah Rice (1750-1805), son of
- Elijah Rice (1719-1785), son of

- Charles Rice (1684-1773), son of
- Thomas Rice (1654-1747), son of
- Thomas Rice (1626-1681), son of

- Edmund Rice, (ca1594-1663)
