= Rugby Northeast =

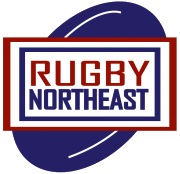
- Sport: Rugby union
- Founded: 2011; 15 years ago
- Commissioner: Devin Digiovanni
- Organizing body: USA Rugby
- No. of teams: 21
- Country: USA
- Region: Northeastern US
- Website: rugbynortheast.org

Rugby Northeast is a college rugby conference operating in Northeastern United States and administered by USA Rugby. As of 2022, the conference is formed by 21 teams.

== Members ==
=== Men's ===
Club	Location	Nickname	Type	Joined	Coach
Bentley University	Waltham, Massachusetts	Falcons	Private	2011	Brian Pendergast
Middlebury College	Middlebury, Vermont	Panthers	Private	2017	Kerry Wiebe
Norwich University	Northfield, Vermont	Cadets	Private	2017	Bob Weggler
Providence College	Providence, Rhode Island	Friars	Private	2011	Mark Simpson-Daniel
University of Massachusetts Lowell	Lowell, Massachusetts	River Hawks	Public	2011	Josh Skinner

=== Women's ===
Tier	Club	Location	Nickname	Type	Joined	Coach
Tier 1	Bentley University	Waltham, Massachusetts	Falcons	Private	2011	Devin DiGiovanni
Tier 1	Bryant University	Smithfield, Rhode Island	Bulldogs	Private	2012	Rosie Downey
Tier 1	Colby College	Waterville, Maine	Mules	Private	2018	Susan Childers
Tier 1	Franklin Pierce University	Rindge, New Hampshire	Ravens	Private	2015	Amy Crumb
Tier 1	Roger Williams University	Bristol, Rhode Island	Hawks	Private	2016	Carol Sacchetti
Tier 1	Saint Michael's College	Colchester, Vermont	Purple Knights	Private	2011	Charles Cisco
Tier 1	Stonehill College	Easton, Massachusetts	Skyhawks	Private	2011	Jason Kolovson
Tier 2	Keene State College	Keene, New Hampshire	Owls	Public	2019	Karen Johannesen
Tier 2	Merrimack College	North Andover, Massachusetts	Warriors	Private	2011	Christian Lavallee
Tier 2	Middlebury College	Middlebury, Vermont	Panthers	Private	2018	K.O. Onufry
Tier 2	Providence College	Providence, Rhode Island	Friars	Private	2011	Michele Armstrong
Tier 2	Saint Anselm College	Goffstown, New Hampshire	Hawks	Private	2012	Franki Mullen
Tier 2	Southern Connecticut State University	New Haven, Connecticut	Owls	Public	2012	Chris Carvalho
Tier 2	University of Massachusetts Lowell	Lowell, Massachusetts	River Hawks	Public	2011	Michael Kierman

=== Former ===
Club	Location	Nickname	Type	Men's/Women's	Joined	Left
American International College	Springfield, Massachusetts	Yellow Jackets	Private	Men's	2011	2012
American International College	Springfield, Massachusetts	Yellow Jackets	Private	Women's	2011	2012
Bryant University	Smithfield, Rhode Island	Bulldogs	Private	Men's	2012	2018
College of the Holy Cross	Worcester, Massachusetts	Crusaders	Private	Men's	2012	2017
College of the Holy Cross	Worcester, Massachusetts	Crusaders	Private	Women's	2012	2019
Merrimack College	North Andover, Massachusetts	Warriors	Private	Men's	2011	2016
Northern Vermont University	Johnson and Lyndon, Vermont	Badgers; Hornets	Public	Women's	2018	2019
Roger Williams University	Bristol, Rhode Island	Hawks	Private	Men's	2015	2019
Saint Anselm College	Goffstown, New Hampshire	Hawks	Private	Men's	2011	2014
Saint Michael's College	Colchester, Vermont	Purple Knights	Private	Men's	2011	2019
Southern Connecticut State University	New Haven, Connecticut	Owls	Public	Men's	2013	2018
Stonehill College	Easton, Massachusetts	Skyhawks	Private	Men's	2011	2018

== Champions ==
Year	Men's	Women's	
Year	Men's	Tier 1	Tier 2
2011			
2012	Providence	Saint Michael’s	
2013			
2014			
2015			
2016			
2017			
2018			
2019			
