= Ocean Born Mary =

American colonist

Mary Wilson Wallace (July 26, 1720 – February 13, 1814), better known as Ocean-Born Mary, is a folklore figure of New England. Born on a ship in the Atlantic Ocean on July 26, 1720, the daughter of James Wilson and Elizabeth Fulton Wilson, Mary grew up in Londonderry, New Hampshire, where she married James Wallace on December 18, 1742. She had four sons, Robert, William, Thomas, and James Wallace, and one daughter, Elizabeth. Three of the sons married sisters, the daughters of Robert and Mary Moore of Londonderry: Robert to Jeannette Moore, William to Hannah Moore, and James to Anna Moore. Elizabeth married Lieutenant Thomas Patterson of the New Hampshire militia.

== Life ==
Mary's background was Scottish through Ireland. Her father died shortly after the ship landed in Boston, and her mother remarried to James Clarke prior to settlement in Londonderry.

During the voyage to the United States, the ship (reputedly called the Wolf) was overtaken by pirates who threatened to loot the ship and sink it with all on board. When the pirate captain heard the cry of an infant, he went below to discover Mrs. Wilson holding her newborn daughter. The pirate captain told Mrs. Wilson that if she would do him the honor of naming the baby after his own mother Mary, he would spare the ship and depart peacefully. Mrs. Wilson agreed, and the pirates departed, but not before the pirate captain briefly returned to the Wolf with a bolt of green brocade silk, which he presented to Mrs. Wilson, stating that it was for little Mary's wedding gown. While Mary did in fact wear the brocade on her wedding day, she may not have been the first to do so, as when her mother remarried the cloth may have been used on that occasion as well.

As an adult, Mary wed James Wallace. They were married for 39 years, until October 30, 1781, when James died in Londonderry and was buried in the Hill Burying Ground there. In 1798, Mary moved in with her son William at his home in Henniker. Ocean-Born Mary died on February 13, 1814, aged 93. She is buried in the Center Burying Ground in Henniker. Her sons and son-in-law were all prominent men in New Hampshire.

Ocean-Born Mary was described as being a handsome woman over six feet tall, with red hair and bright green eyes. While reports of her physical appearance cannot be verified, all her sons were known to be very tall, red-haired, and green-eyed, which might lend credibility to the description. She was said to be elegant in her manners, resolute and determined, of strong mind, quick of comprehension, sharp in her conversation, and very witty, with a strong brogue.

Pieces of the gown she married in are scattered in various places, including the New Hampshire Historical Society. The folk song "Ocean-Born Mary" by Neptune's Car was inspired by Mary's story.

== Reputation ==
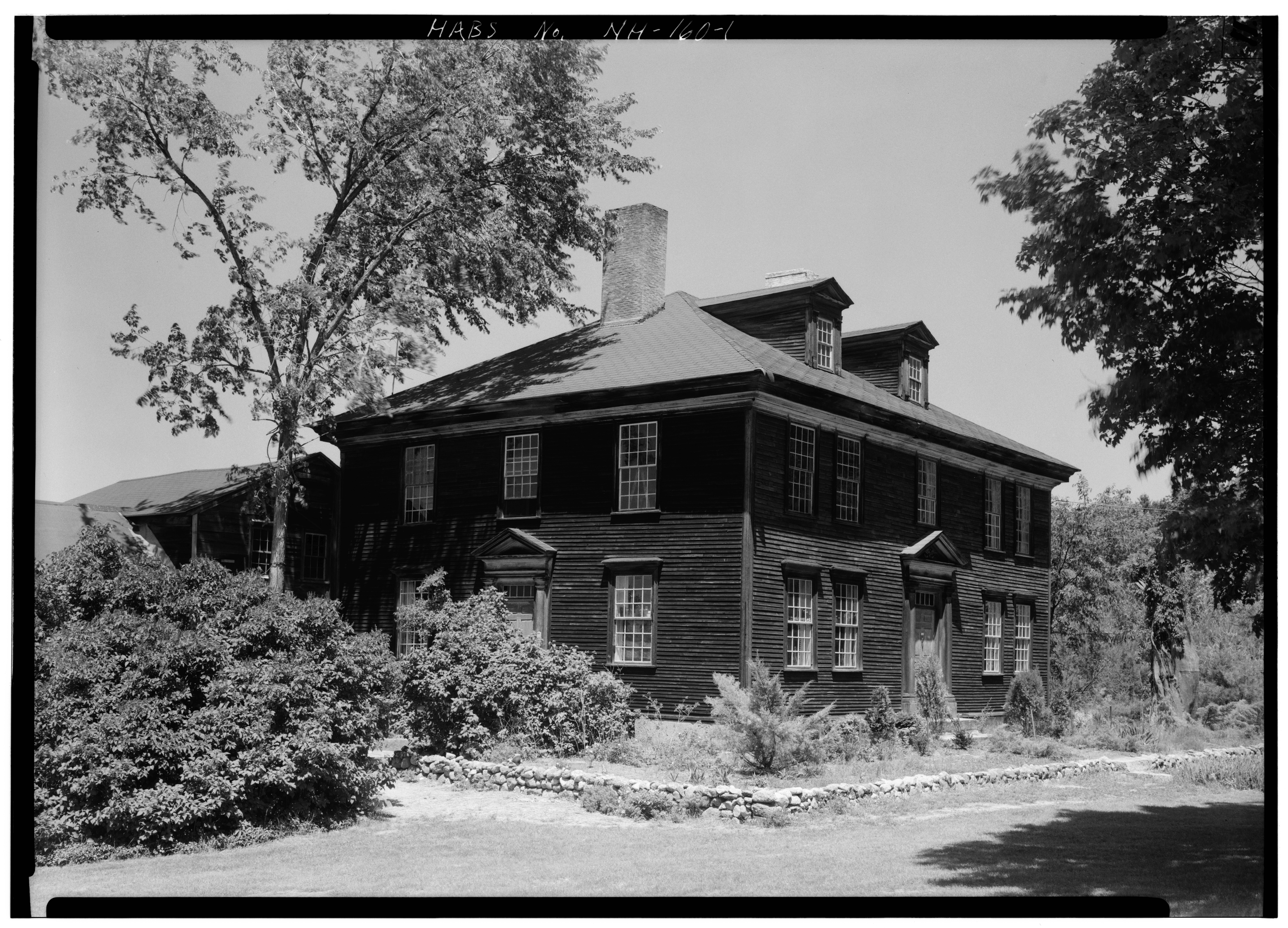
Ocean-Born-Mary House, Route 202 vicinity, Henniker, Merrimack County, NH HABS NH,7-HEN,2-1

Mary's claim to fame is as a reputed ghost, though Mary herself never lived in the house she is said to haunt. There were two Wallace houses in the town of Henniker, one the home of Mary's son Robert, the other home to her son William. After her husband's death, Mary lived with William, but she did not care for Robert and rarely visited his home. William Wallace's house became the town poorhouse in 1840, and in 1923, it burned to the ground. Robert's home, built in 1760, still stands and is said to be the location of the haunting.

The story of the haunting was begun by Louis and Flora Roy, who owned the Robert Wallace house in the 1930s. According to the Roys' story, the same pirate captain who spared Mary's ship reunited with her in her widowhood, and she took him into her home and cared for him in his old age. Allegedly the captain was murdered under Mary's roof, and Mary buried him and his treasure under the hearthstone in accordance with his instructions. Her ghost was said to haunt the house in order to protect the hidden treasure. Lost strangers stopping at the house to ask for directions were said to be met at the door by a tall red-haired woman in colonial dress, who they assumed to be an historical reenactor. Others claim to have seen a similar figure in the yard or walking on the road into town. No evidence of either treasure or human remains has been found at either Wallace house, and the story is considered by townsfolk and historians to be entirely invented.
