= Henniker, New Hampshire =

- Town
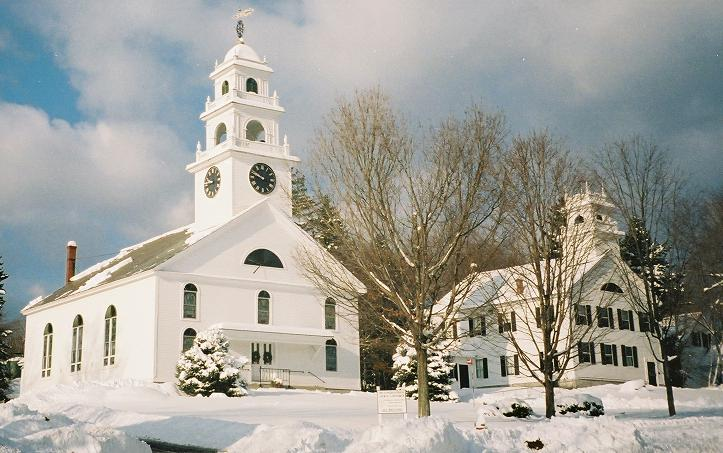
- Congregational Church (left), Henniker Historical Society Museum (right)

- Seal
- Motto: The Only Henniker on Earth
- Location in Merrimack County and the state of New Hampshire
- Coordinates: 43°10′47″N 71°49′20″W
- Country: United States
- State: New Hampshire
- County: Merrimack
- Incorporated: 1768
- Villages: Henniker; West Henniker

Area
  - Total: 44.80 sq mi (116.04 km^{2})
  - Land: 44.12 sq mi (114.27 km^{2})
  - Water: 0.68 sq mi (1.77 km^{2}) 1.52%
- Elevation: 436 ft (133 m)

Population (2020)
  - Total: 6,185
  - Density: 140/sq mi (54.1/km^{2})
- Time zone: UTC−5 (Eastern)
  - Summer (DST): UTC−4 (Eastern)
- ZIP Code: 03242
- Area code: 603
- FIPS code: 33-35540
- GNIS feature ID: 873623
- Website: www.henniker.org

Henniker is a town in Merrimack County, New Hampshire, United States. As of the 2020 census, the reported total population of the town was 6,185, although the figure, 27.9% greater than the 2010 population, has been questioned by local officials. Henniker is home to New England College and Pats Peak Ski Area. Henniker is a college town and resort area, featuring both skiing and white-water kayaking.

The main village of the town, where 3,166 people resided at the 2020 census, is defined as the Henniker census-designated place (CDP), and is located along the Contoocook River at the junction of New Hampshire Route 114 with Old Concord Road. The town also includes the village of West Henniker.

== History ==
The area was first known as "Number Six" in a line of settlements running between the Merrimack and Connecticut rivers. In 1752, the Masonian Proprietors granted the land to Andrew Todd, who called it "Todd's Town". Settled in 1761 by James Peter, it was dubbed "New Marlborough" by others from Marlboro, Massachusetts. Incorporated in 1768 by Governor John Wentworth, the town was named for Sir John Henniker, a London merchant of leather and fur, with shipping interests in Boston and Portsmouth.

In the 19th century Henniker had a high rate of congenital deafness, and its own sign language, which may have played a significant role in the emergence of American Sign Language.

Farmers found the town's surface relatively even, with fertile soil. Various mills operated by water power on the Contoocook River, including a woolen factory. By 1859, the population was 1,688. But the mills in Henniker were closed in 1959 by the Hopkinton-Everett Lakes Flood Control Project.

The Edna Dean Proctor Bridge, a stone double-arch bridge spanning the Contoocook, was built in 1835. A building for Henniker Academy was constructed of split granite in 1836.

Beginning in the late 1800s, the river's scenic beauty attracted tourism.

The game of paintball originated in Henniker in 1981.

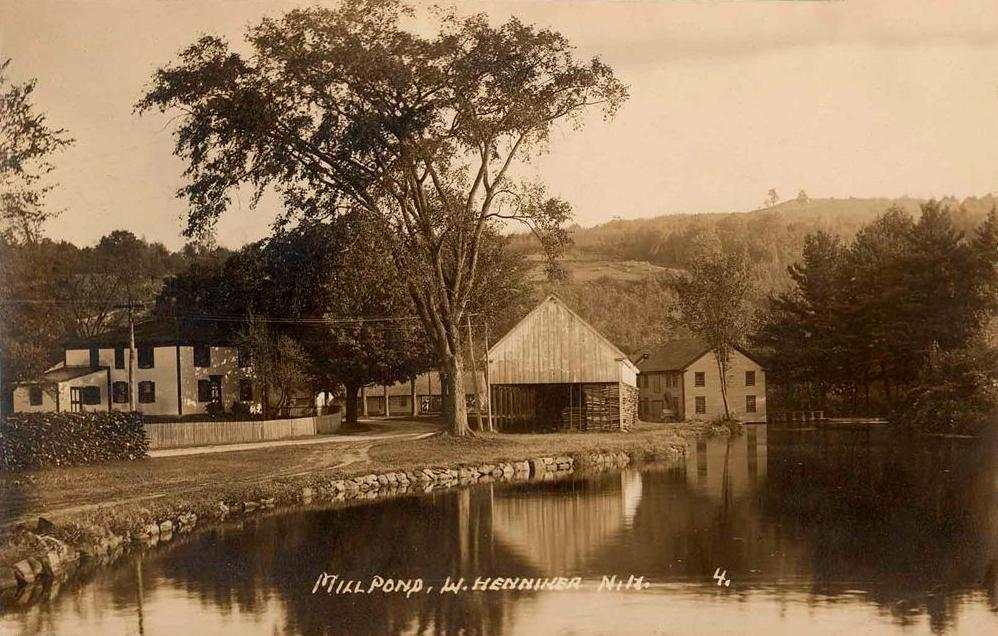
West Henniker millpond in 1914

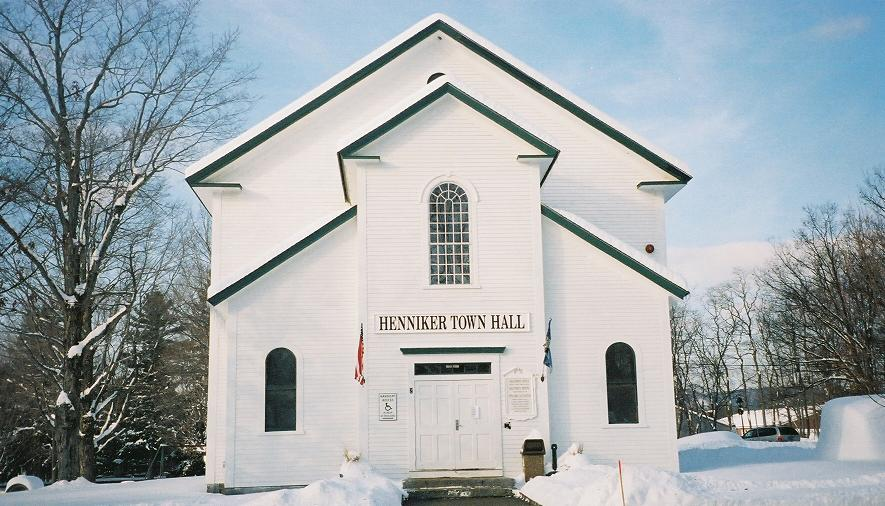
Town Hall

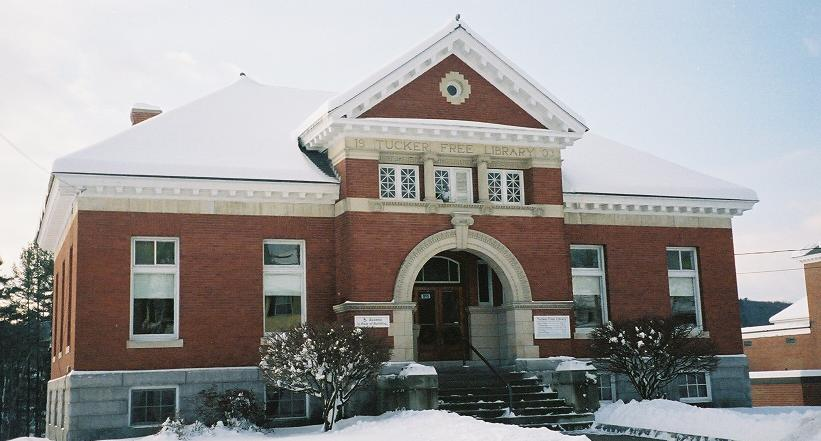
Tucker Free Library

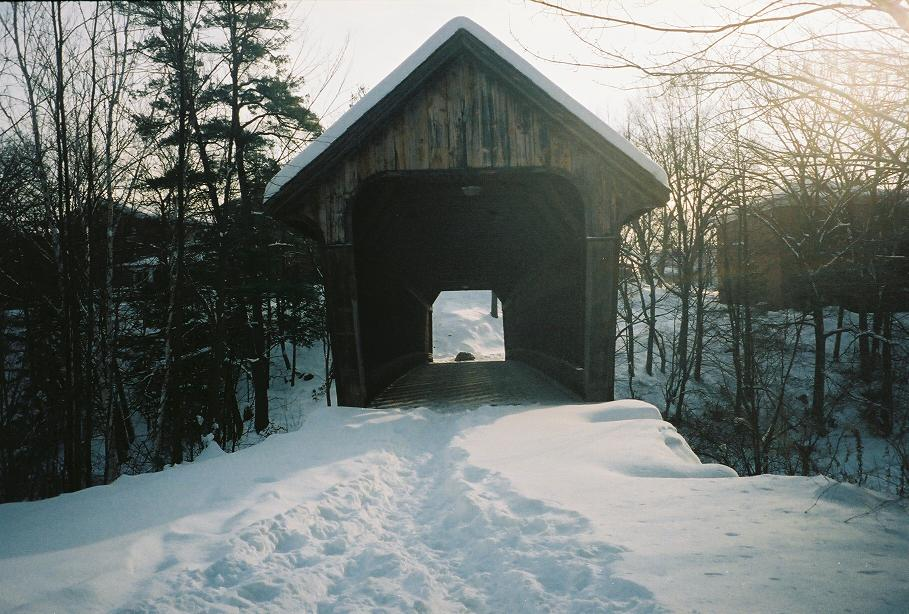
Covered bridge

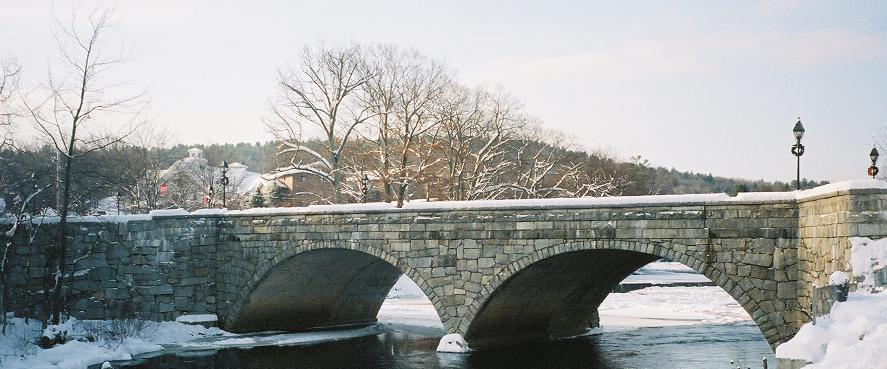
Edna Dean Proctor Bridge over the Contoocook River

== Geography ==
According to the United States Census Bureau, the town has a total area of 44.8 square miles (116.0 km^{2}), of which 44.1 square miles (114.3 km^{2}) are land and 0.69 square miles (1.8 km^{2}) are water, comprising 1.52% of the town. The village of Henniker, or census-designated place (CDP), has a total area of 1.4 square miles (3.6 km^{2}), all land. Henniker is drained by the Contoocook River and its tributary Amey Brook. The town's southwestern corner is drained by headwaters of Dudley Brook, leading to the Piscataquog River in neighboring Weare. The town lies fully within the Merrimack River watershed.

Craney Hill, elevation 1,402 feet (427 m) above sea level and home of the Pats Peak ski area, is in the south. The highest point in Henniker is an unnamed summit near the town's northwestern corner, with an elevation of 1,552 ft (473 m).

Henniker is crossed by U.S. Route 202 and state routes 9 and 114.

=== Adjacent municipalities ===
- Warner (north)
- Hopkinton (east)
- Weare (southeast)
- Deering (southwest)
- Hillsborough (west)
- Bradford (northwest)

== Demographics ==
Historical population
Census	Pop.	Note	%±
1790	1,127		—
1800	1,476		31.0%
1810	1,608		8.9%
1820	1,900		18.2%
1830	1,725		−9.2%
1840	1,715		−0.6%
1850	1,688		−1.6%
1860	1,500		−11.1%
1870	1,288		−14.1%
1880	1,326		3.0%
1890	1,385		4.4%
1900	1,507		8.8%
1910	1,395		−7.4%
1920	1,344		−3.7%
1930	1,266		−5.8%
1940	1,336		5.5%
1950	1,675		25.4%
1960	1,636		−2.3%
1970	2,348		43.5%
1980	3,246		38.2%
1990	4,151		27.9%
2000	4,433		6.8%
2010	4,836		9.1%
2020	6,185		27.9%
U.S. Decennial Census

As of the census of 2010, there were 4,836 people, 1,780 households, and 1,124 families residing in the town. There were 1,928 housing units, of which 148, or 7.7%, were vacant. The racial makeup of the town was 95.7% white, 1.2% African American, 0.4% Native American, 1.1% Asian, 0.0% Native Hawaiian or Pacific Islander, 0.5% some other race, and 1.1% from two or more races. Of the population, 1.7% were Hispanic or Latino of any race.

Of the 1,780 households, 30.3% had children under the age of 18 living with them, 49.2% were headed by married couples living together, 9.5% had a female householder with no husband present, and 36.9% were non-families. Of all households, 26.3% were made up of individuals, and 7.1% were someone living alone who was 65 years of age or older. The average household size was 2.41, and the average family size was 2.91. 541 residents, or 11.3% of the population, lived in group quarters rather than households.

In the town, 19.1% of the population were under the age of 18, 21.3% were from 18 to 24, 20.1% from 25 to 44, 30.5% from 45 to 64, and 9.0% were 65 years of age or older. The median age was 35.2 years. For every 100 females, there were 102.0 males. For every 100 females age 18 and over, there were 99.5 males.

For the period 2011–2015, the estimated median annual income for a household was $67,197, and the median income for a family was $80,845. Male full-time workers had a median income of $67,755 versus $49,677 for females. The per capita income for the town was $28,377. 10.3% of the population and 3.3% of families were below the poverty line. 12.8% of the population under the age of 18 and 5.5% of those 65 or older were living in poverty.

== Government ==
In the New Hampshire Senate, Henniker is in the 7th District, represented by Republican Daniel Innis. On the New Hampshire Executive Council, Henniker is in the 2nd District, represented by Democrat Karen Liot Hill. In the United States House of Representatives, Henniker is in New Hampshire's 2nd congressional district, represented by Democrat Maggie Goodlander.

== Education ==
Henniker is part of New Hampshire School Administrative Unit #24, which also includes Weare and Stoddard, New Hampshire. Kindergarten and primary school students attend Henniker Community School, while secondary level students attend John Stark Regional High School in Weare. Henniker is also home to New England College, a four-year private liberal arts college. Henniker has a free library for residents, two community centers, and a Parent-Teacher Association.

== Culture ==
=== Religion ===
Henniker has a Congregational church, a Roman Catholic church, a Quaker meeting house, and Community Christian Fellowship.

== Notable people ==
- Amy Beach (1867–1944), composer, pianist
- Laurie D. Cox (1883–1968), landscape architect, college president
- Robert Goodenow (1800–1874), US congressman
- Rufus K. Goodenow (1790–1863), US congressman
- Ocean Born Mary (1720–1814), subject of a local ghost legend
- James W. Patterson (1823–1893), US congressman, senator
- Parker Pillsbury (1809–1898), minister; abolitionist
- Edna Dean Proctor (1829–1923), writer
- Jacob Rice (1787–1879), state legislator, farmer
- Kristen Ulmer (born 1966), extreme skier, writer
- Ted Williams (1918–2002), member of the National Baseball Hall of Fame and Museum

== Sites of interest ==
- Ames State Forest
- Craney Hill State Forest
- Henniker Historical Society at Henniker Academy
- New England College
- Pats Peak
