= New Hampshire Division of Forests and Lands =

Government agency in the U.S. state of New Hampshire

Agency overview
- Preceding agency: State Forestry Department (1910)
- Jurisdiction: New Hampshire
- Headquarters: 172 Pembroke Road; Concord, New Hampshire
- Agency executives: Patrick Hackley, Director and State Forester; Joanne Barry, Business Administrator
- Parent agency: New Hampshire Department of Natural and Cultural Resources
- Website: www.nh.gov/nhdfl

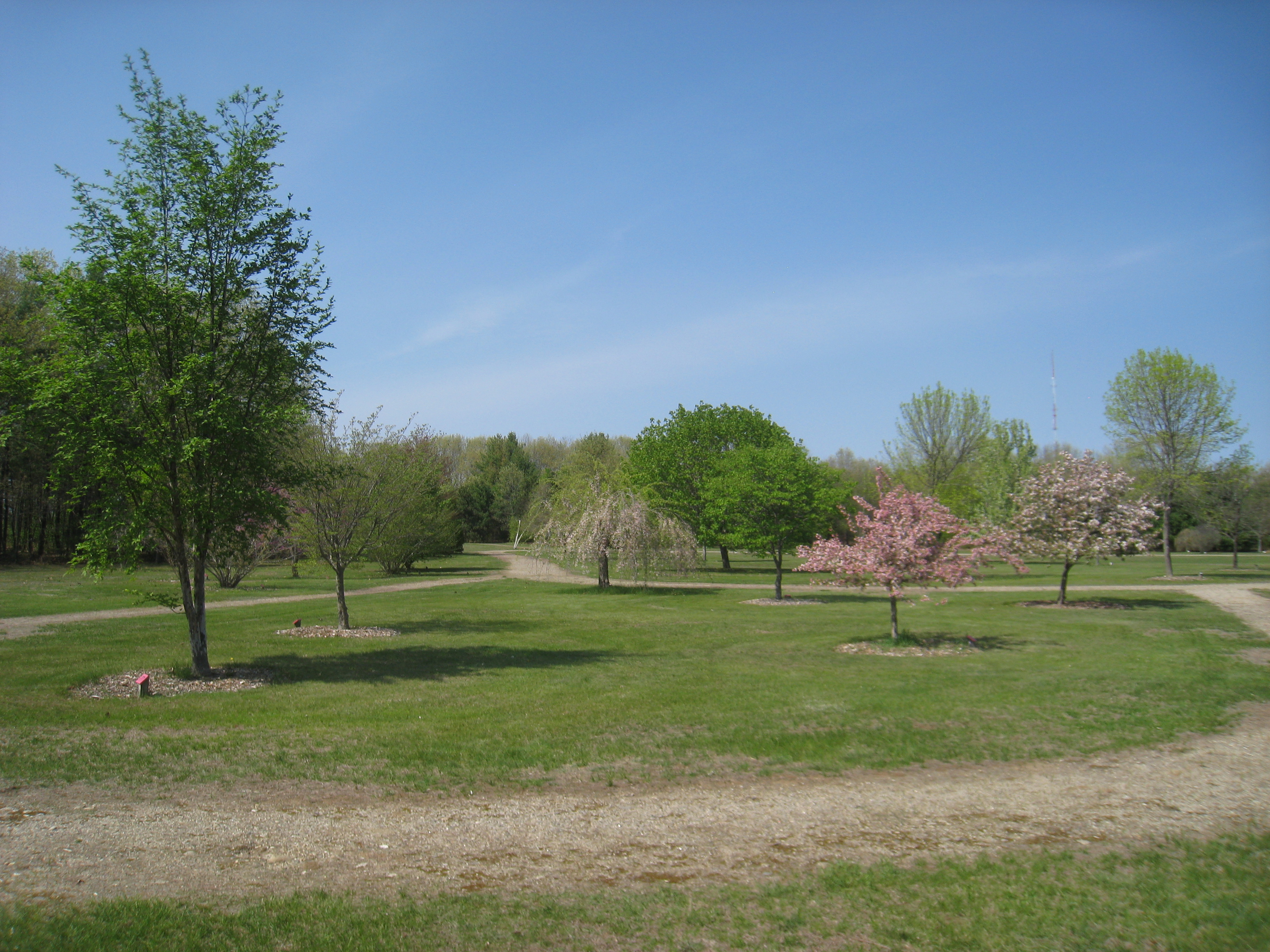
Arboretum at the Urban Forestry Center, located in Portsmouth

The New Hampshire Division of Forests and Lands is a government agency of the U.S. state of New Hampshire. The division "protects and promotes the values provided by trees, forests, and natural communities." Brad Simpkins is director of DHR and the State Forester. The agency's main office is located in Concord.

== History ==
New Hampshire first established a State Forestry Department and hired the first State Forester in 1910. Other elements of the current Division of Forests and Lands date to at least 1917 with the establishment of a "white pine blister rust control program" (white pine blister rust is a tree disease caused by Cronartium ribicola). That control program became the Forest Insect and Disease Program in 1965, and since 1997 has been the Forest Health Section within the division. Since 2017, the division's parent agency has been the New Hampshire Department of Natural and Cultural Resources (DNCR).

Authority for the division comes from Title XIX-A, Forestry; and RSA 217-A, New Hampshire Native Plant Protection.

== Function ==
Per their mission statement, the division provides "responsible management of the State's forested resources; by providing natural resource information and education to the public; and through the protection of these resources for the continuing benefit of the State's citizens, visitors, and forest industry."

The main functions of the division are:

- Forest Health Bureau – "Provide and maintain forest and tree pest control programs in coordination with other state and federal agencies"
- Forest Management Bureau – "forest management of woodlands under state jurisdiction, cultivation and sale of seedlings for forestry and conservation, and the research, demonstration and promotion of scientific forestry"
- Forest Protection Bureau – "responsible for protecting over 4.5 million acres (1,800,000 ha) of both public and private forestlands from the threat of wildland fire and crimes against the forest resource"
- Natural Heritage Bureau – "finds, tracks, and facilitates the protection of New Hampshire's rare plants and exemplary natural communities"
- Planning and Community Forestry Bureau – "deliver accurate resource information, expand knowledge, and motivate...action to maximize the contribution of New Hampshire's forests to the enhancement of their quality of life"

== See also ==
- List of New Hampshire state forests
