= New Hampshire Department of Natural and Cultural Resources =

Government agency in the U.S. state of New Hampshire

New Hampshire Department of Natural and Cultural Resources (DNCR)

Agency overview
- Formed: July 1, 2017
- Preceding agency: Department of Cultural Resources (1998)
- Jurisdiction: New Hampshire
- Headquarters: 172 Pembroke Road; Concord, New Hampshire
- Agency executives: Sarah L. Stewart, Commissioner; Christopher Marino, Business Operations
- Website: www.dncr.nh.gov

The New Hampshire Department of Natural and Cultural Resources (DNCR) is a government agency of the U.S. state of New Hampshire. The main office of DNCR is located in Concord.

== History ==
New Hampshire's Department of Natural and Cultural Resources (DNCR) was established via legislative act on July 1, 2017, as the state combined the Department of Cultural Resources with the Division of Parks and Recreation and the Division of Forest and Lands. The two noted divisions had previously been part of the Department of Resources and Economic Development (DRED), which was dissolved. Other functions within DRED were placed into the Department of Business and Economic Affairs (DBEA), formed at the same time.

DNCR oversees five other state agencies:

- New Hampshire Division of Historical Resources
- New Hampshire Division of Forests and Lands
- New Hampshire Division of Parks and Recreation
- New Hampshire State Council on the Arts
- New Hampshire State Library
