= Deer Mountain Campground =

Park in New Hampshire, United States

- Location within New Hampshire
- Interactive map of Deer Mountain Campground
- Location: Pittsburg, New Hampshire, United States
- Coordinates: 45°11′28″N 71°11′31″W
- Elevation: 1,972 feet (601 m)
- Administrator: New Hampshire Division of Parks and Recreation
- Website: Official website
- New Hampshire State Parks

Deer Mountain Campground is located on U.S. Route 3 in 1,648-acre (667 ha) Connecticut Lakes State Forest in Pittsburg, New Hampshire. The campground is adjacent to the Connecticut River between Second and Third Connecticut Lakes, south of the Canadian border. The area is known for moose watching. Park activities include camping at 25 primitive sites, picnicking, canoeing and fishing.
