= Indian Stream =

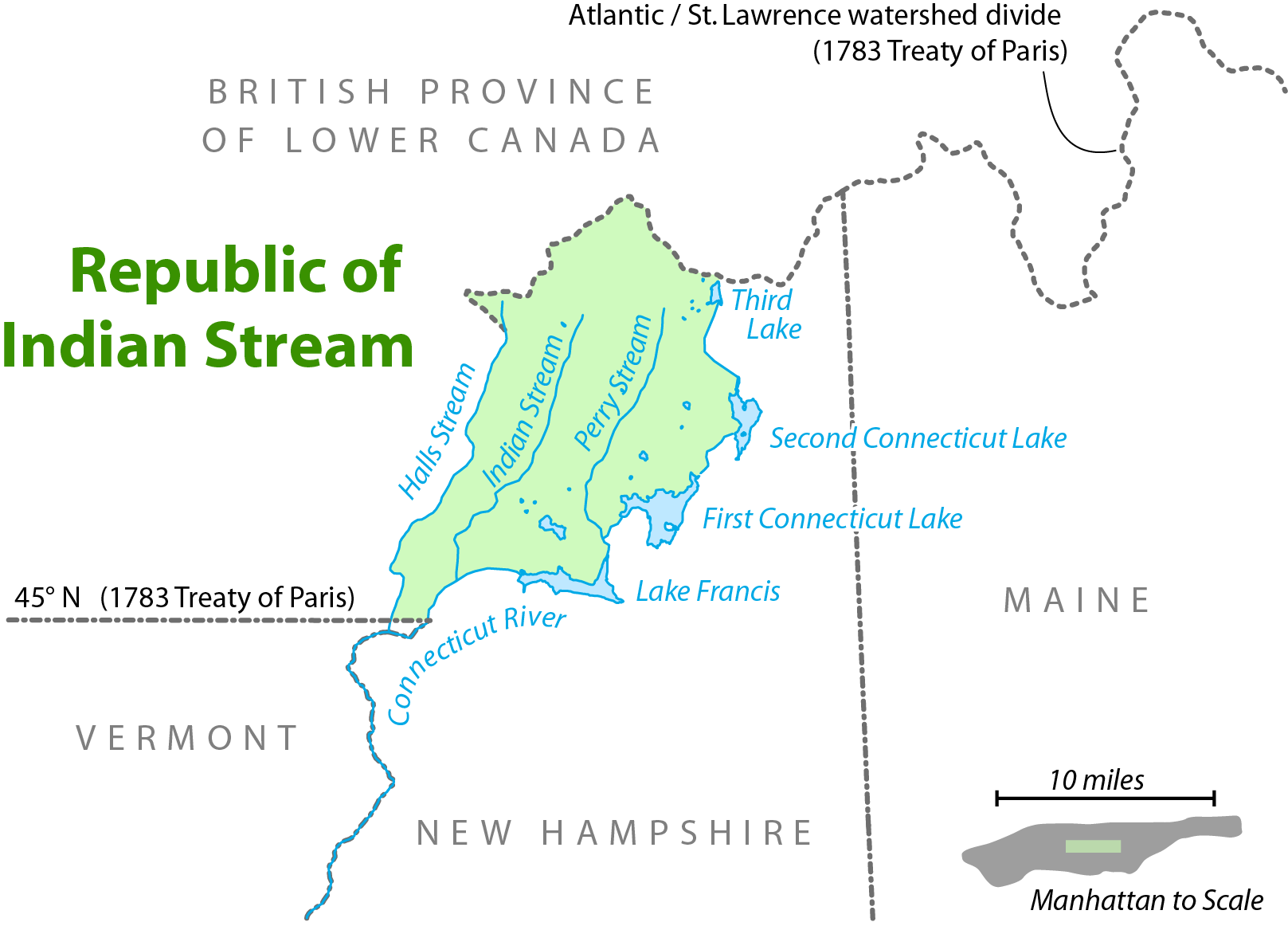
- Map showing the Republic of Indian Stream (1832–1835) with Indian Stream near center of the green area

- Location within New Hampshire Location within the United States

Location
- Country: United States
- State: New Hampshire
- County: Coös
- Town: Pittsburg

Physical characteristics
- Source: Confluence of East and West Branches
  - location: Pittsburg
  - coordinates: 45°12′9″N 71°20′14″W
  - elevation: 1,420 ft (430 m)
- Mouth: Connecticut River
  - location: Pittsburg
  - coordinates: 45°2′32″N 71°26′33″W
  - elevation: 1,158 ft (353 m)
- Length: 19.1 mi (30.7 km)

Indian Stream is a tributary of the Connecticut River, approximately 19.1 miles (30.7 km) long, in New Hampshire in the United States. It rises in the mountains of extreme northern New Hampshire, in Coös County near the Canada–United States border, where the East Branch of Indian Stream joins the West Branch. Indian Stream flows south-southwest, joining the Connecticut 2 miles (3 km) downstream from the village of Pittsburg.

The area around Pittsburg was the subject of a border dispute in the 1830s between the United States and Canada, leading to the short-lived, self-proclaimed Republic of Indian Stream. The border dispute, based upon an ambiguity in the Treaty of Paris (1783), was resolved in 1842, with the river drainage and the land lying east of Halls Stream established as part of the state of New Hampshire.

== See also ==
- List of New Hampshire rivers
