= Back Lake (New Hampshire) =

Lake in Coos County, New Hampshire

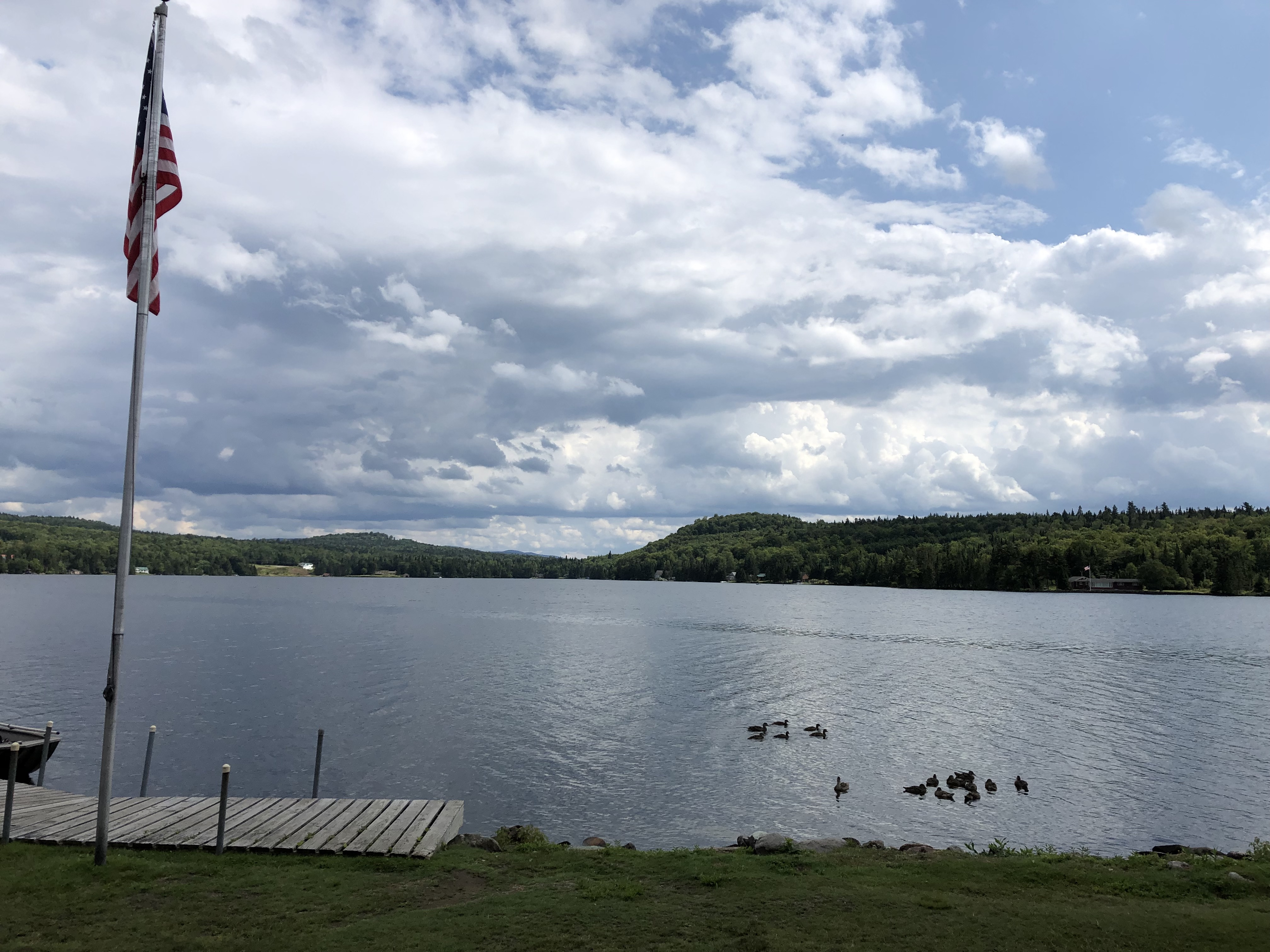
- Looking south across Back Lake, August 2019

- Location in New Hampshire Location in the United States
- Location: Coos County, New Hampshire
- Coordinates: 45°04′49″N 71°21′07″W
- Primary outflows: Back Lake Brook
- Basin countries: United States
- Max. length: 1.4 mi (2.3 km)
- Max. width: 0.6 mi (0.97 km)
- Surface area: 348 acres (1.41 km^{2})
- Average depth: 7 ft (2.1 m)
- Max. depth: 15 ft (4.6 m)
- Surface elevation: 1,575 ft (480 m)
- Settlements: Pittsburg

Back Lake is a 348-acre (141 ha) water body located in Coos County in northern New Hampshire, United States, in the town of Pittsburg. It is part of the Connecticut River watershed. It is situated north of Lake Francis and west of First Connecticut Lake. U.S. Route 3 passes by Back Lake's eastern shore.

The lake is classified as a coldwater fishery, with observed species including brook trout, rainbow trout, brown trout, and brown bullhead.

There are numerous cabins around the lake, and two public boat launch locations. Boats on the lake are generally restricted to a maximum speed of 10 miles per hour (16 km/h), and skicraft have been banned since 2004.

== See also ==
- List of lakes in New Hampshire
