= Luther Parker =

American political figure of the Republic of Indian Stream in the 1830s

Justice of the Peace of the Republic of Indian Stream
- In office July 9th, 1832 – August 5th, 1835
- Preceded by: Office established (Joseph M. Harper as Governor of New Hampshire)
- Succeeded by: Office abolished (Issac Hill as Governor of New Hampshire)

Personal details
- Born: December 18, 1800 Temple, New Hampshire, U.S.
- Died: June 16, 1853 (aged 52) Muskego, Wisconsin, U.S.
- Spouse: Alletta French
- Children: Charles D. Parker
- Occupation: Shoemaker; teacher; politician

Luther Parker (December 18, 1800 – June 16, 1853) was an American pioneer, teacher, and politician. He served as justice of the peace (the highest constitutional officer) of the Republic of Indian Stream, located in what is now Pittsburg, New Hampshire. He later was an early settler in present-day Muskego, Wisconsin.

== Biography ==
Born in Temple, New Hampshire, Parker was a shoemaker and taught school in Coos County, New Hampshire. After his marriage in 1827, he and his wife, Alletta, moved to what would become the Republic of Indian Stream, where he operated a store. Parker helped to draft the Indian Stream Constitution and served as justice of the peace, a role that made him one of the primary leaders of the Republic of Indian Stream. In 1835, the Canadian authorities arrested Parker. In 1836, he and his family moved to Muskego, Waukesha County, Wisconsin Territory. In 1846, Parker served in the Wisconsin Territorial House of Representatives, first as a Democrat and then as a member of the Free Soil Party. In 1851, Parker served on the Waukesha County Board of Supervisors. He died in Muskego in 1853 at the age of 52.

== Legacy ==
Parker's son, Charles D. Parker, served as the Lieutenant Governor of Wisconsin from 1874 to 1878. In Muskego, Wisconsin, the cemetery where Luther Parker is buried is named in his honor. In Pittsburg, New Hampshire, a marker on the southwestern shore of First Connecticut Lake commemorates Parker's contributions to the Republic of Indian Stream, while a metal stele featuring a silhouette of Parker was erected in the town park in 2016.

Marker for Parker at First Connecticut Lake

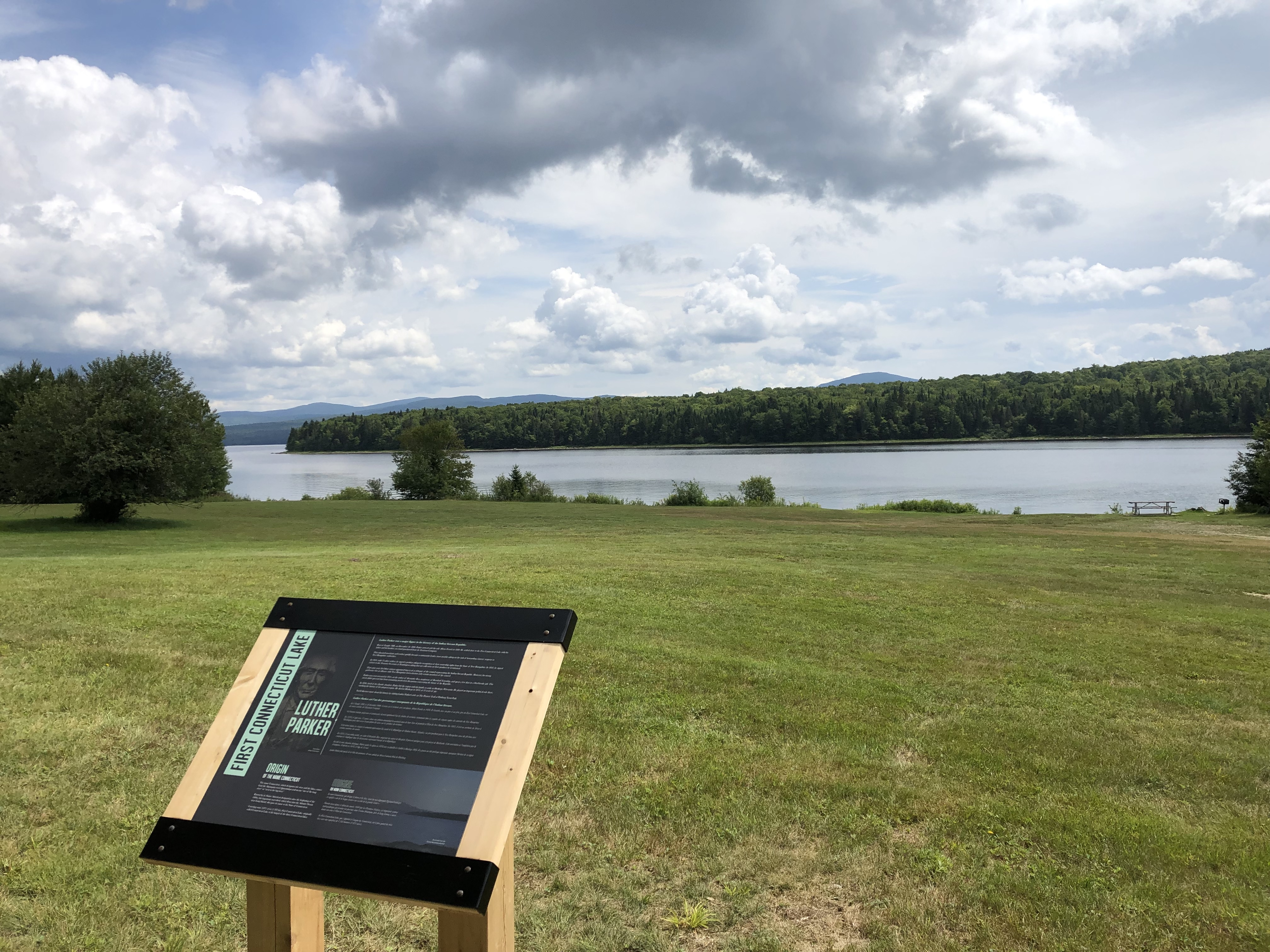
Marker, and view across a section of the lake

Metal stele erected in 2016
