= Republic of Indian Stream =

Short-lived 1830s republic in present-day U.S. state of New Hampshire

Coordinates: 45°9′N 71°20′W

- 1832–December 1840
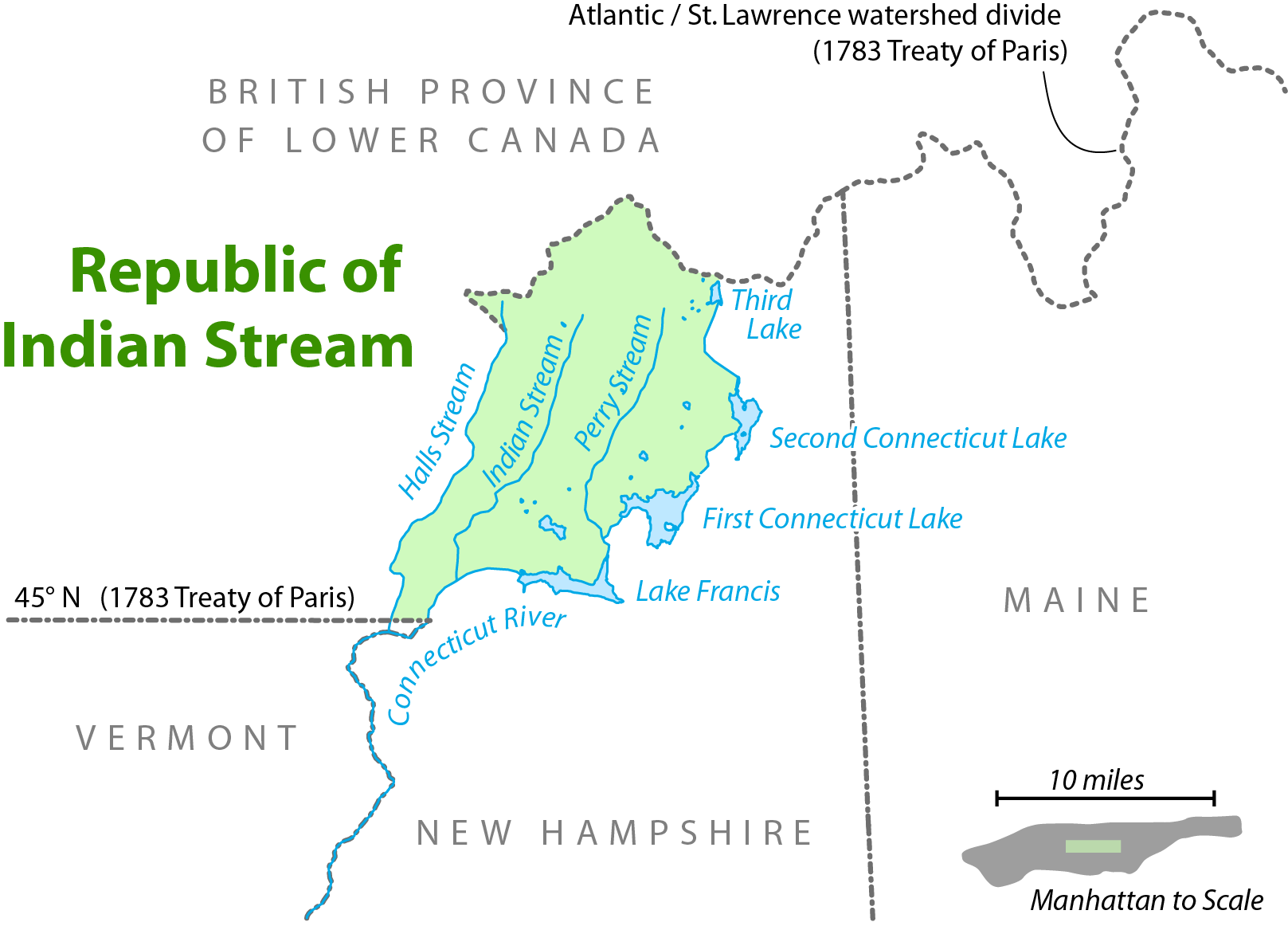
- Location of the Republic of Indian Stream, bordered to the north by the British colony of Lower Canada and to the south by the American state of New Hampshire.
- Status: Unrecognized state
- Capital: Entire area later renamed Pittsburg, New Hampshire
- Largest city: N/A
- Common languages: English
- Government: Republic
- Justice of the Peace
  - 1832−1835: Luther Parker
- Elected council
  - 1835: Richard J. Blanchard, Jeremiah Tabor, Burley Blood, Abner Hyland, William White
- History
  - Independence declared: July 9, 1832
  - Independence relinquished: 1835
  - Annexation by New Hampshire: August 5, 1835
  - Citizens resolution favoring New Hampshire: April 2, 1836
  - Becomes part of Pittsburg, New Hampshire: December 1840
Preceded by	Succeeded by
Lower Canada	New Hampshire

The Republic of Indian Stream or the Indian Stream Republic was an unrecognized republic in North America, along the section of the border that divides the current Canadian province of Quebec from the U.S. state of New Hampshire. It existed from July 9, 1832, to August 5, 1835. Described as "Indian Stream Territory, so-called" by the United States census-taker in 1830, the area was named after Indian Stream, a small watercourse. It had an organized elected government and constitution and served about three hundred citizens.

== History ==
=== Settlement ===
The area was first settled by Europeans under a land grant, from King Philip, an Abenaki man, named after Metacomet, who was also called King Philip.

This grant was sold to one land-speculation company, while a second group of Indians from the same tribe made representations to another company of Europeans that their chief had been deposed and that they were empowered to issue a grant to the second company. Following the Revolutionary War, both companies surveyed the territories and issued their own land grants to settlers, which frequently overlapped one another. After the War of 1812, when both companies were in financial straits, they merged and reconciled all land claims.

=== Establishment ===
The establishment of Indian Stream as an independent nation was, essentially, the result of the ambiguous boundary between the United States and British Lower Canada as defined in the 1783 Treaty of Paris. There were three possible interpretations of where "the northwesternmost head of the Connecticut River" might be. As a result, the area in and around the three tributaries that fed into the head of the Connecticut River was not definitively under the jurisdiction of either the United States or Lower Canada (which was formed in 1791).

The relevant text from the treaty reads:

... [westward] along the said highlands which divide those rivers that empty themselves into the river St. Lawrence, from those which fall into the Atlantic Ocean, to the northwesternmost head of the Connecticut River; thence down along the middle of that river to the forty-fifth degree of north latitude; from thence by a line due west on said latitude ...

The Republic encompassed the northern reaches of what is now the state of New Hampshire, including the four Connecticut Lakes. While the British claimed the southeasternmost branch (the chain of Connecticut Lakes), the U.S. claimed the border as it is today (i.e., Halls Stream to the west, which is, arguably, the "northwesternmost headwater" of the Connecticut). Both sides sent in tax collectors and debt-collecting sheriffs. The double taxation angered the population, and the Republic was formed to put an end to the issue until such time as the United States and Great Britain could reach a settlement on the boundary line. Some of the citizenry considered Indian Stream to be part of the U.S. but not a part of New Hampshire. The Indian Stream assembly declared independence on July 9, 1832, and produced a constitution. One of the drafters of the constitution was Luther Parker, who served as Justice of the Peace for the Republic from 1832 to 1835.

The Constitution of Indian Stream states in "Part Second – Form of Government":

The people inhabiting the territory formerly called Indian Stream Territory do hereby solemnly and mutually agree with each other to form themselves into a body politic by the name of Indian Stream and in that capacity to exercise all the powers of a free, sovereign and independent state, so far as it relates to our own internal government till such time as we can ascertain to what government we properly belong.

=== Annexation to New Hampshire ===
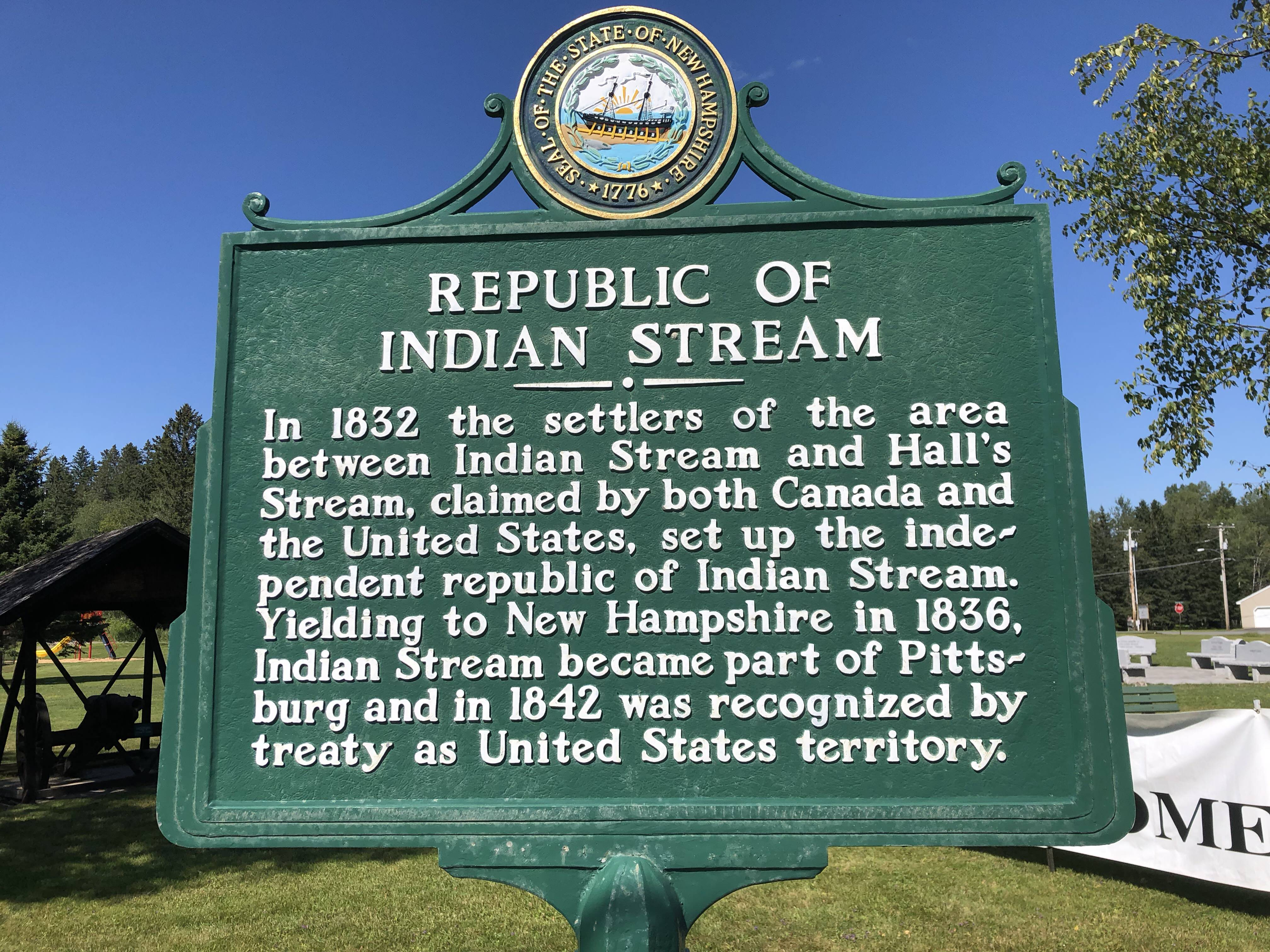
New Hampshire historical marker (number 1) for the Republic of Indian Stream in Pittsburg

The independence declaration did not cause the sheriff of Coös County to cease his involvement in affairs, with later events leading to an impending invasion by New Hampshire. On July 30, 1835, this sheriff asked for the militia. Two companies of infantry from the towns around Colebrook met at Stewartstown, ready to march into the disputed territory. The sheriff preceded them and, on August 4, met with between 30 and 40 members of the assembly, to whom he issued an ultimatum. Threatened with forcible occupation, most of the gathered assembly capitulated and relented to being annexed by New Hampshire. The Republic ceased to operate independently the next day when five leaders of Indian Stream wrote to a British official in Sherbrooke, Lower Canada, that, with a response to their petition for protection by the British not having occurred in time, Indian Stream had agreed to annexation by New Hampshire. One of the "Streamers", Richard I. Blanchard, agreed to serve as a deputy sheriff of Coös County. The militia stayed in Stewartstown and dispersed to their homes on August 6.

The annexation of Indian Stream by New Hampshire did not resolve the land dispute. Local British officials took a dim view of the annexation. An incident soon tested the situation. In October 1835, Blanchard led a small party to arrest John Tyler for an unpaid hardware-store debt. After the arrest, Tyler was freed on the road back to Coös County by a group of his neighbors. In reporting the incident to the British magistrate, Tyler falsely stated under oath that the location of his arrest was Drayton, Lower Canada. The magistrate then issued a warrant for Blanchard's arrest, which was carried out by a deputy and a few members of the British faction of Streamers, who returned with Blanchard toward the magistrate's house in Lower Canada.

Along the way, a group of Streamers stopped them in the road, rescued Blanchard and returned with their freed comrade to Indian Stream. The deputy's party continued on to the magistrate's house. Several hours later, there was a commotion in the road nearby from a posse of armed Streamers, emboldened by liquor, bent on making an impression. The invading posse shot the deputy through the thigh and then captured the hobbled magistrate with a blow of a saber to his scalp during a struggle. They returned to Canaan, Vermont, with the bleeding magistrate as prisoner, where local leaders treated his wound and released him immediately. In the aftermath, a detachment of fifty New Hampshire militia, including troops and officers, occupied the territory from mid-November until February 18, 1836. On April 2, 1836, a resolution "that New Hampshire has a right to exercise an unconditional control over the territory of Indian Stream" was approved by the citizens of Indian Stream.

This international incident caused a diplomatic crisis. The British ambassador to the United States protested to President Andrew Jackson and the Secretary of State. Both governments, appalled at the idea of war over a matter so trivial as a hardware-store debt, determined to take measures so that matters did not escalate, and an uneasy peace endured in the years preceding the conclusion of a treaty settling the border.

In July 1837, Lord Palmerston in London dismissed all charges in the British Judiciary System arising from the incident and reiterated the British position that the territory was part of British North America. The area was still described as Indian Stream at the time of the U.S. census taken on June 1, 1840, when the local population totalled 315. Upon petition by the residents, the area was incorporated as the town of Pittsburg in 1840.

In 1842, the land dispute was definitively resolved by the Webster–Ashburton Treaty, and the land was assigned to New Hampshire. The 1845 Lewis Robinson "Map of New Hampshire based on the latest authorities" shows the boundary as being north of the town of Clarksville but just south of modern-day Pittsburg.

== See also ==
- Aroostook War
- Caroline affair
- Republic of Madawaska
