= Lake Francis State Park =

State park in Coös County, New Hampshire, United States

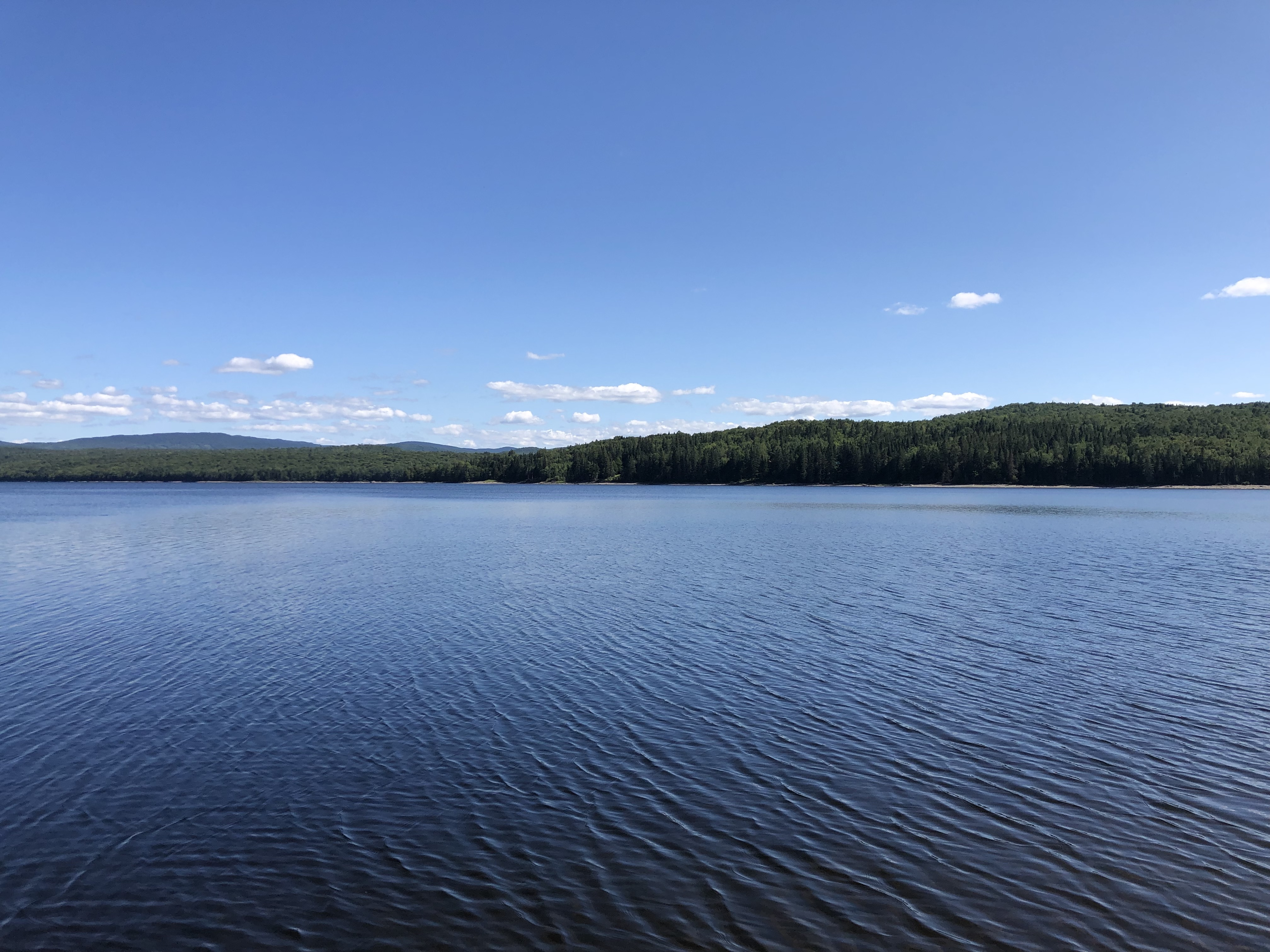
- View of Lake Francis
- Interactive map of Lake Francis State Park
- Location: Pittsburg, New Hampshire, United States
- Coordinates: 45°03′40″N 71°18′04″W
- Area: 38 acres (15 ha)
- Elevation: 1,421 feet (433 m)
- Established: 1976
- Administrator: New Hampshire Division of Parks and Recreation
- Website: Official website
New Hampshire State Parks
Lake Francis State Park
- Location within New Hampshire

Lake Francis State Park is a public recreation area located on Lake Francis in the town of Pittsburg, New Hampshire, United States. The state park has a boat launch, visitor center, and playground and offers opportunities for fishing, canoeing on the reservoir and upper part of the Connecticut River, ATV riding, camping, and snow sports.

The park saw its genesis with the transfer in 1976 of 17 acres of land on Lake Francis from the New Hampshire Water Resources Board to the Department of Resources and Economic Development.
