= Mount Magalloway =

Mountain in New Hampshire, United States

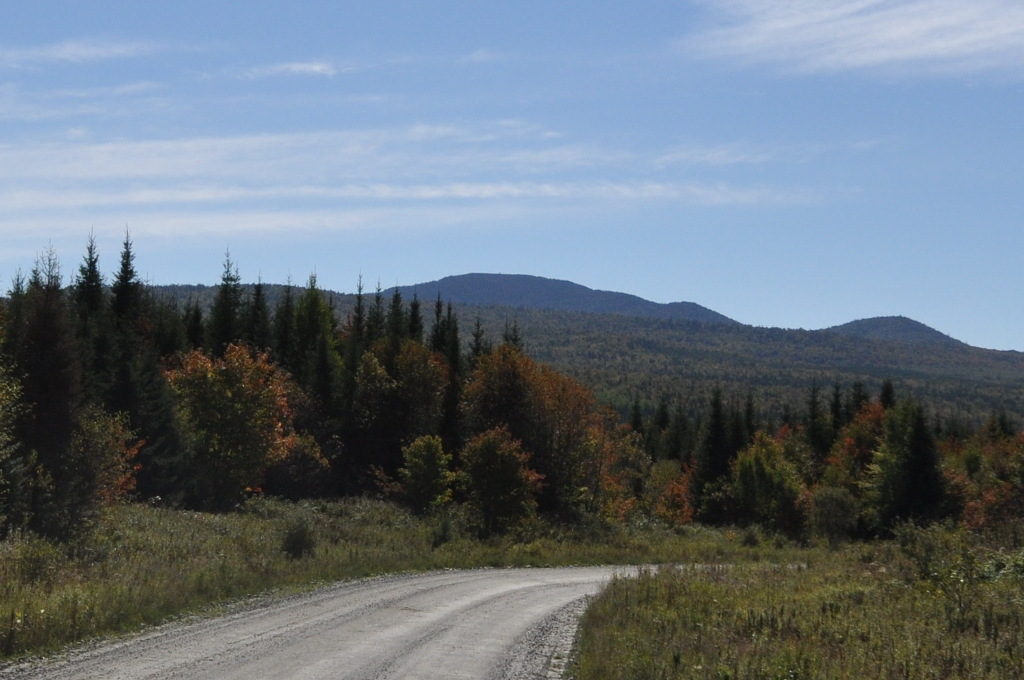
- Mount Magalloway from Magalloway Rd.

Highest point
- Elevation: 3,383 ft (1,031 m)
- Coordinates: 45°3′49″N 71°9′47″W

Geography
- Location within New Hampshire
- Location: Pittsburg, Coös County, New Hampshire, U.S.

Climbing
- Easiest route: Hike

Mount Magalloway (or Magalloway Mountain) is a mountain in the Great North Woods region of New Hampshire in the United States. With a summit elevation of 3,383 feet (1,031 m), it is one of the tallest peaks in Pittsburg, the state's northernmost community. From the observation tower at its summit, three states and the Canadian province of Quebec are visible. The mountain is climbable via a trail less than 1 mile (1.6 km) long that begins at the end of a logging road off Magalloway Road in eastern Pittsburg and ascends about 800 feet (240 m). The summit area includes a former watcher's cabin that is available for rent by the state.
