= Lake Francis (Murphy Dam) =

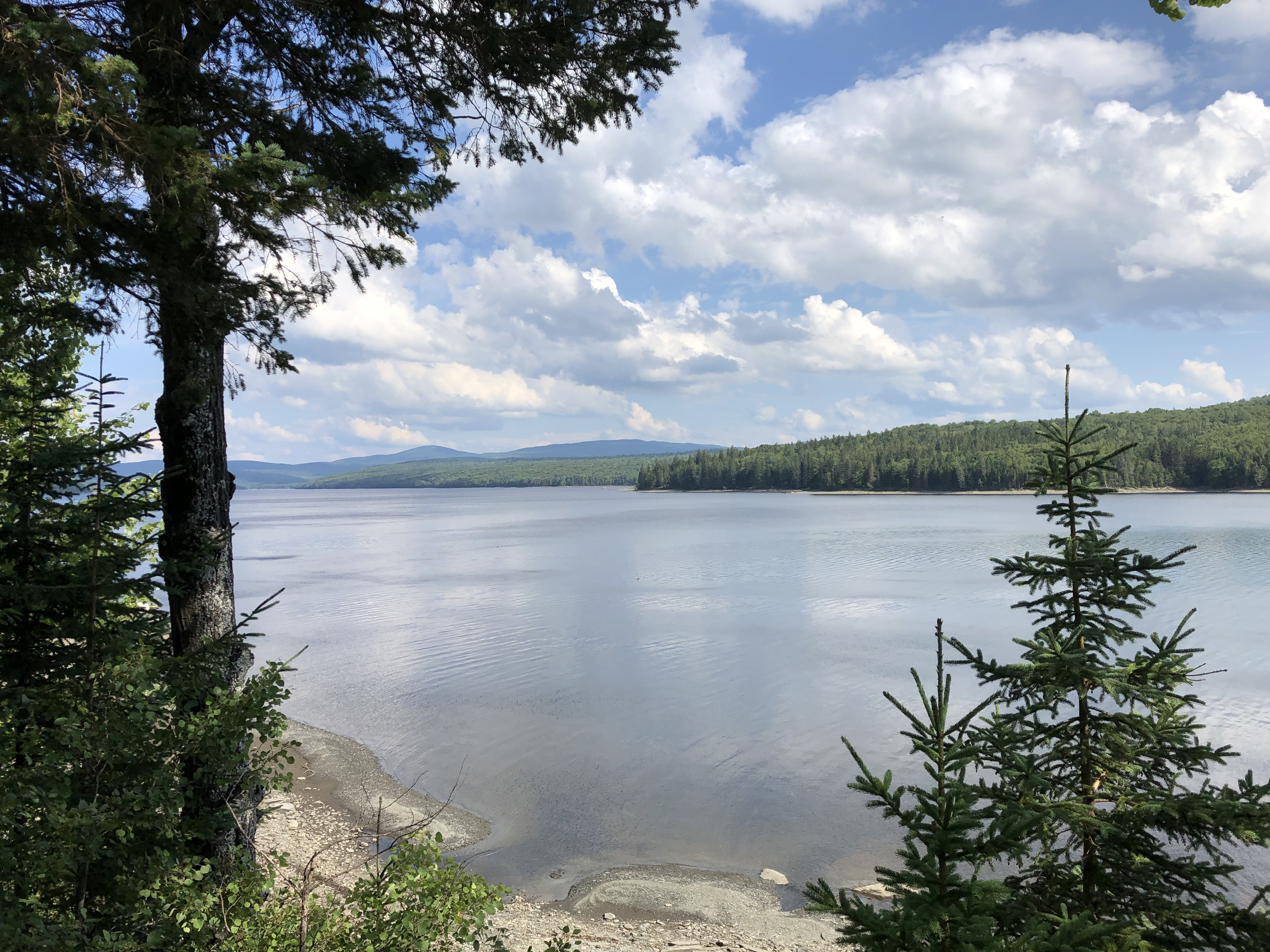
- Lake Francis as seen from U.S. Route 3 along its northern shore

- Location within New Hampshire Location within the United States
- Location: Coos County, New Hampshire
- Coordinates: 45°2′24″N 71°19′48″W
- Type: Reservoir
- Etymology: Francis P. Murphy
- Primary inflows: Connecticut River
- Primary outflows: Connecticut River
- Basin countries: United States
- Max. length: 5.4 mi (8.7 km)
- Max. width: 1.3 mi (2.1 km)
- Surface area: 1,934 acres (783 ha)
- Average depth: 40 feet (12 m)
- Max. depth: 82 feet (25 m)
- Surface elevation: 1,379 ft (420 m)
- Settlements: Pittsburg; Clarksville

Lake Francis is a reservoir on the Connecticut River in northern New Hampshire, United States. The lake is located in Coos County, east of the village of Pittsburg and along the boundary between the towns of Pittsburg and Clarksville. The lake is impounded by Murphy Dam, built in 1940 as a flood control project. The 117-foot (36 m) earthen dam is owned by the Water Division of the state's Department of Environmental Services, and is operated by TC Energy (formerly TransCanada Corporation).

Lake Francis and Murphy Dam are named after Francis P. Murphy, who served as the Governor of New Hampshire from 1937 to 1941. The lake covers nearly 2,000 acres (8 km^{2}), has a capacity of 131,375 acre-feet (162,049,000 m^{3}), and has average and maximum depths of 40 feet (12 m) and 82 feet (25 m), respectively.

The lake is classified as a coldwater fishery, with observed species including rainbow trout, brown trout, landlocked salmon, lake trout, and chain pickerel. There are two public boat launch locations, and ice fishing is permitted from January through March.

Lake Francis State Park is located on the northeast side of the lake, where the Connecticut River flows in. North of Lake Francis is Back Lake, while First Connecticut Lake (one of a series of four Connecticut Lakes that serve as the headwaters of the Connecticut River) lies to the northeast.

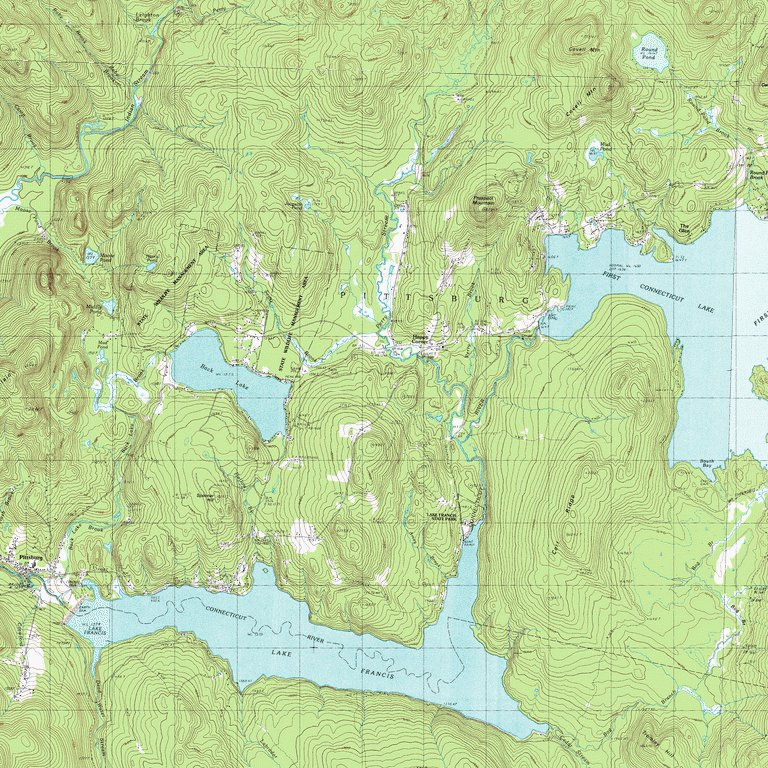
Topographical map of Lake Francis (bottom center), with Back Lake to its north, and First Connecticut Lake to the northeast

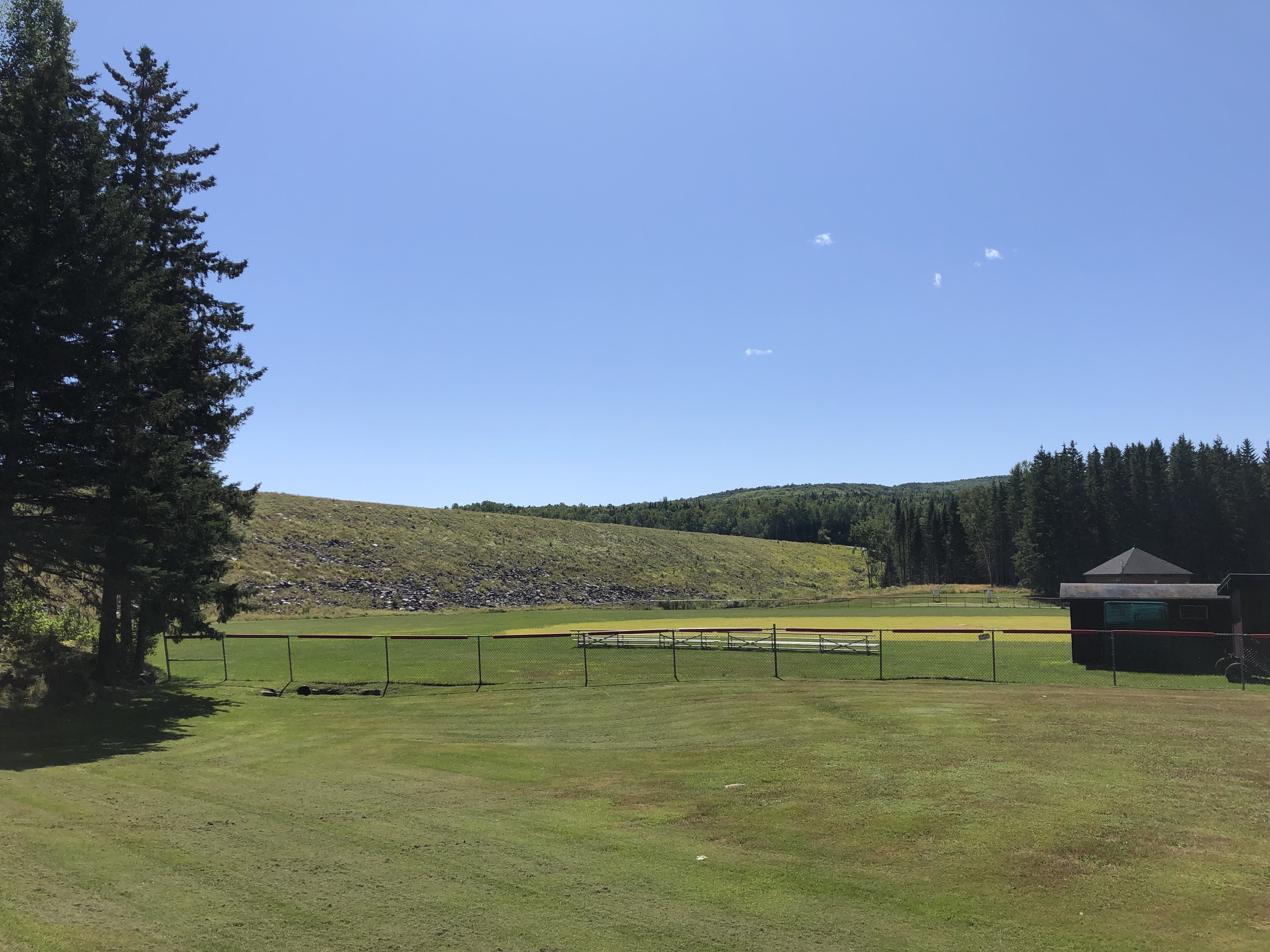
View of Murphy Dam looking up at the embankment; fence in the foreground is part of a local baseball field

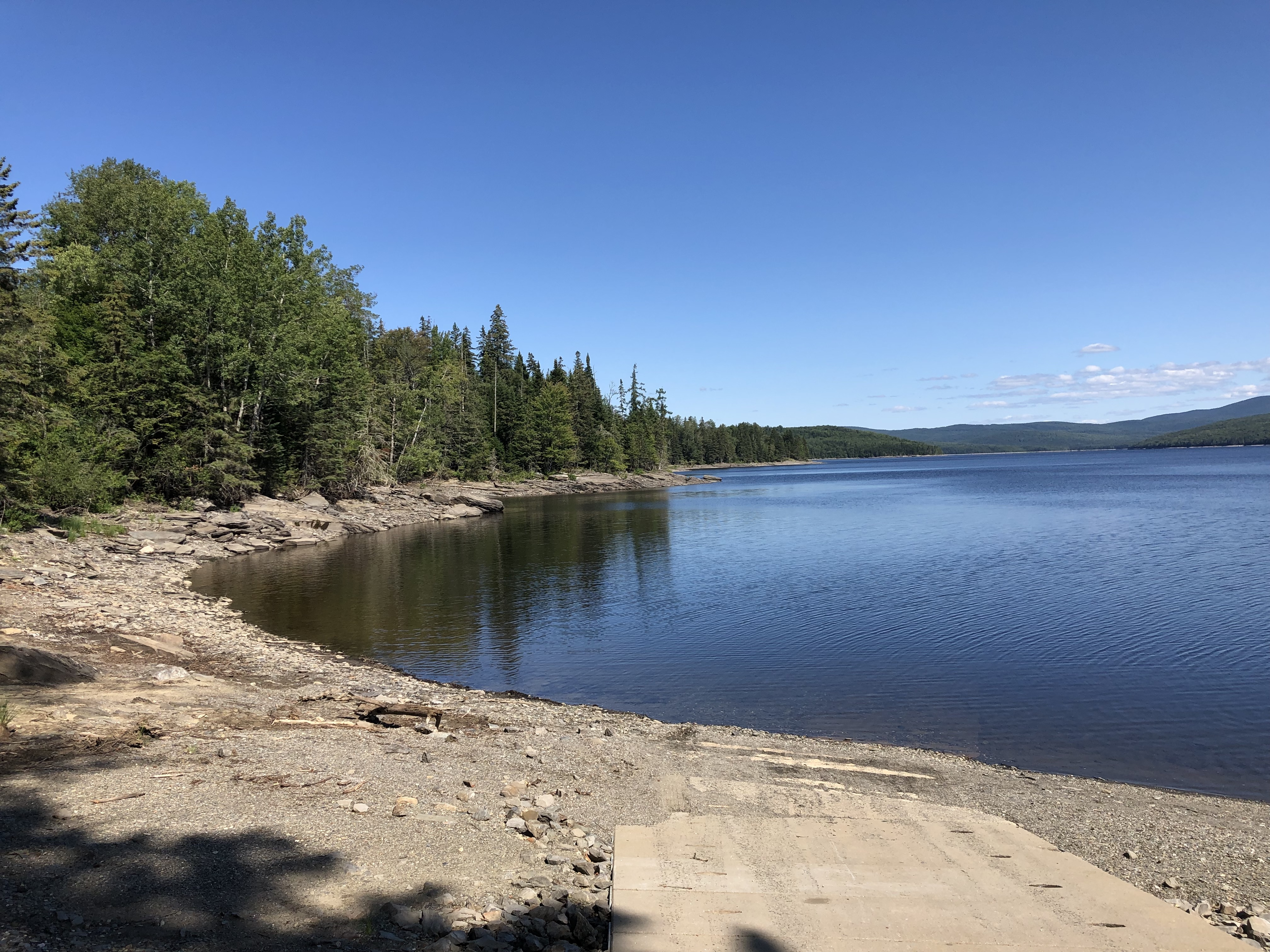
View of Lake Francis at the public boat launch along U.S. Route 3

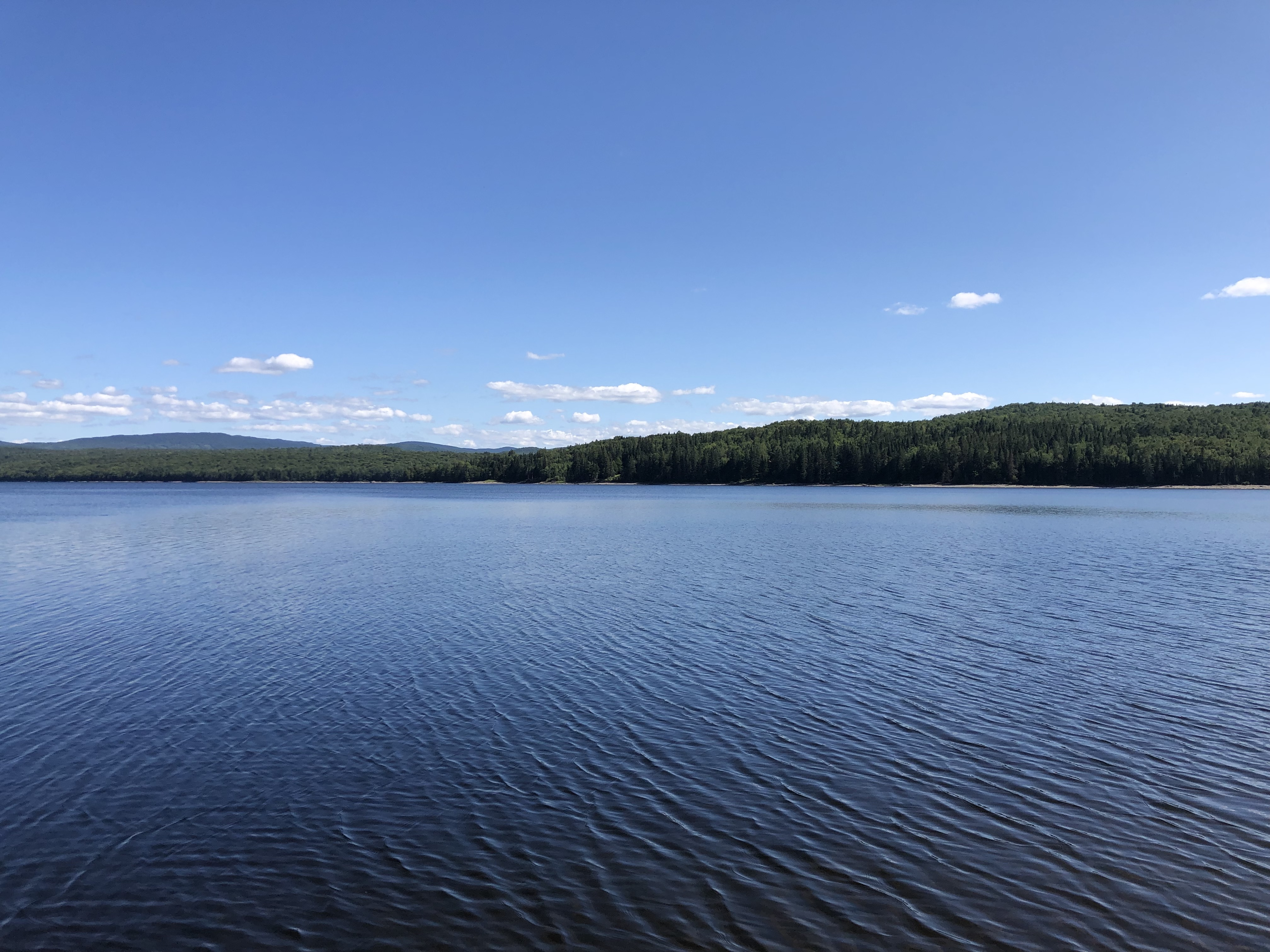
View looking south from near the boat launch

== See also ==
- List of lakes in New Hampshire
