= Pittsburg, New Hampshire =

- Town
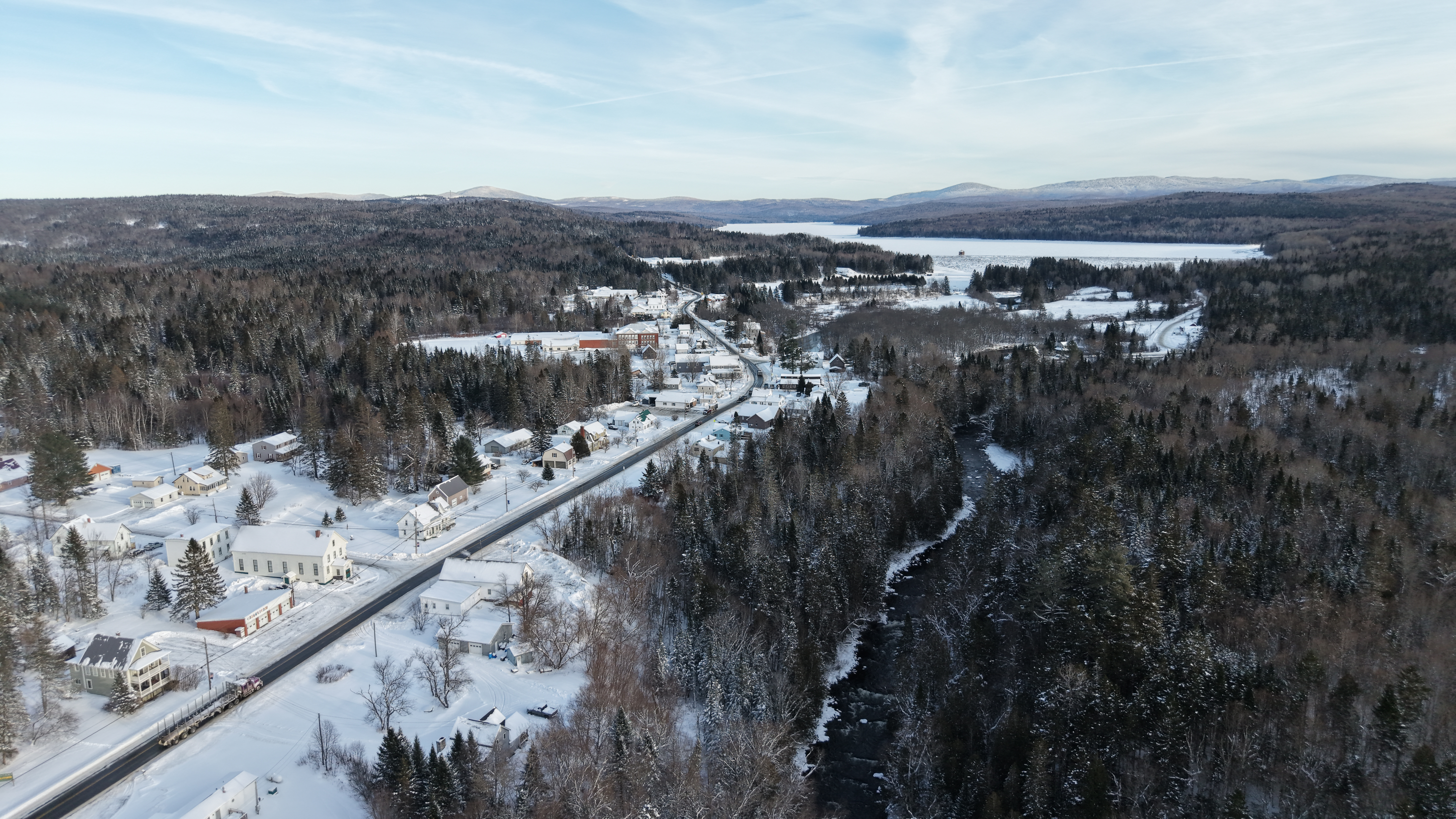
- Pittsburg, NH, from the west

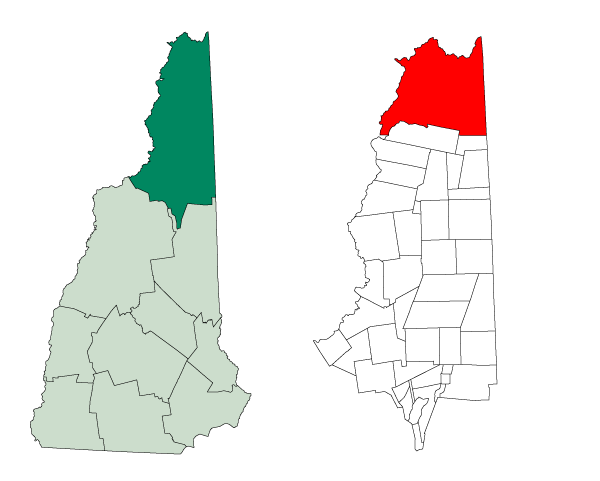
- Location in Coös County, New Hampshire
- Coordinates: 45°08′32″N 71°16′24″W
- Country: United States
- State: New Hampshire
- County: Coös
- Incorporated: 1840
- Named for: William Pitt, 1st Earl of Chatham
- Villages: Pittsburg; Happy Corner; Idlewilde

Area
  - Total: 291.3 sq mi (754.5 km^{2})
  - Land: 281.3 sq mi (728.6 km^{2})
  - Water: 10.0 sq mi (25.8 km^{2}) 3.43%
- Elevation: 1,959 ft (597 m)

Population (2020)
  - Total: 800
  - Density: 2.8/sq mi (1.1/km^{2})
- Time zone: UTC−5 (Eastern)
  - Summer (DST): UTC−4 (Eastern)
- ZIP code: 03592
- Area code: 603
- FIPS code: 33-61780
- GNIS feature ID: 871099
- Website: pittsburg-nh.gov

Pittsburg is the largest town by area in New England, located in Coös County, New Hampshire, United States. The population was 800 at the 2020 census. It is the northernmost town in New Hampshire, and makes up about 3% of the state's area. U.S. Route 3 is the only major highway in the town, although the northern terminus of New Hampshire Route 145 also lies within Pittsburg.

Pittsburg is part of the Berlin, New Hampshire micropolitan area.

== History ==
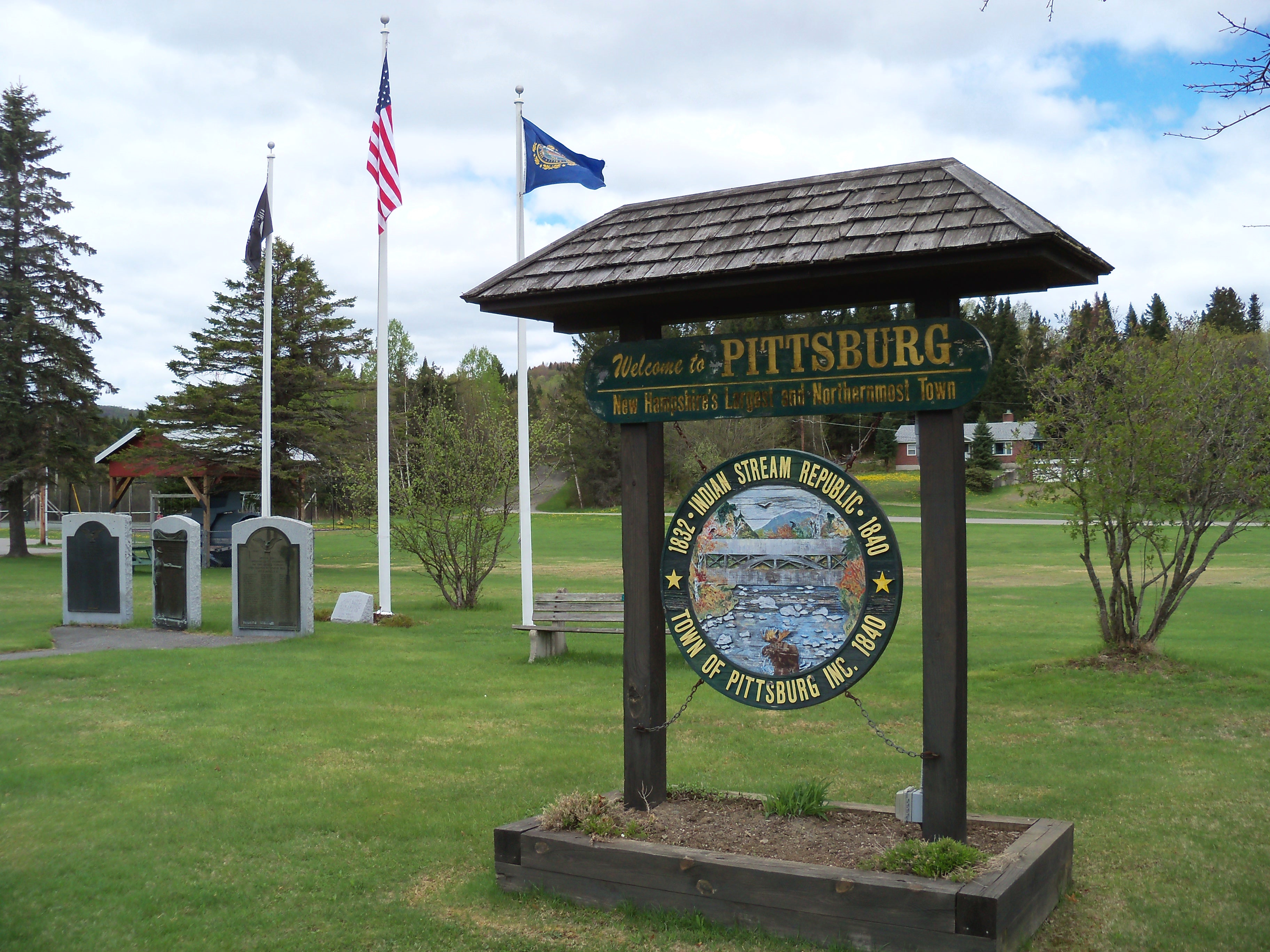
Park in Pittsburg

Pittsburg derives its name from William Pitt, Prime Minister of Great Britain. Prior to its incorporation in 1840, the area was settled c. 1810 and known as the Territory of Indian Stream. It had the unique distinction of having been its own microstate briefly during the 1830s, called the Republic of Indian Stream, due to an ambiguous boundary between the United States and Canada.

The Indian Stream Schoolhouse on Tabor Road, which dates to 1897, is listed in both the National Register of Historic Places and the New Hampshire State Register of Historic Places; the town hall on Main Street, which dates to 1883, is listed in the State Register.

== Geography ==
Pittsburg shares an international border with Québec province, Canada, to its west and north, and borders the states of Maine (to the east) and Vermont (a very small portion to the southwest). Directly to the south is Clarksville. Pittsburg is the only New Hampshire municipality to border Canada, the only one that borders both Maine and Vermont, the only one to share a land border with Vermont, and the only town entirely north of the 45th parallel. Pittsburg contains the only part of New Hampshire west of the Connecticut River, as that river defines the Vermont state line from Clarksville southward. The Pittsburg–Chartierville Border Crossing, New Hampshire's only Canadian border crossing, is located in the town, at the northern terminus of U.S. Route 3. The western edge of Pittsburg is defined by Halls Stream, being the "northwesternmost headwaters of the Connecticut River", which defined (ambiguously) the border in the Treaty of Paris of 1783.

Contained within the boundaries of Pittsburg are the Connecticut Lakes, which form the beginning of the Connecticut River. Early maps (e.g. 1854) also show several grants that were incorporated into the eastern edge of Pittsburg, including Carlisle No. 1, Webster/Carlisle No. 2 and Hubbards No. 3, all north of Atkinson and Gilmanton Academy Grant.

According to the United States Census Bureau, the town has a total area of 291.3 square miles (754.5 km^{2}), the largest in New Hampshire and New England of any municipality incorporated as a town. A total of 281.3 square miles (728.6 km^{2}) of Pittsburg are land and 10.0 square miles (25.8 km^{2}) are water, the latter comprising 3.43% of the town.

The highest point in Pittsburg is the summit of Stub Hill, at 3,627 feet (1,106 m). Mount Magalloway, elevation 3,383 feet (1,031 m), is a prominent summit reachable by hiking trail.

=== Adjacent municipalities ===
- Chartierville, Quebec, Canada (north)
- Notre-Dame-des-Bois, Quebec, Canada (northeast)
- North Oxford, Maine (east)
- Atkinson and Gilmanton Academy Grant (southeast)
- Clarksville (south)
- Canaan, Vermont (southwest)
- East Hereford, Quebec, Canada (west)
- Saint-Venant-de-Paquette, Quebec, Canada (west)
- Saint-Malo, Quebec, Canada (west)
- Saint-Isidore-de-Clifton, Quebec, Canada (northwest)

== Climate ==
According to the Köppen Climate Classification system, First Connecticut Lake has a warm-summer humid continental climate, abbreviated "Dfb" on climate maps. The hottest temperature recorded at First Connecticut Lake was 93 °F (33.9 °C) on July 8, 1921, and July 19, 1953, while the coldest temperature recorded was −45 °F (−42.8 °C) on February 1, 1920.

Climate data for First Connecticut Lake, New Hampshire, 1991–2020 normals, extremes 1918–present
Month	Jan	Feb	Mar	Apr	May	Jun	Jul	Aug	Sep	Oct	Nov	Dec	Year
Record high °F (°C)	60 (16)	64 (18)	77 (25)	83 (28)	91 (33)	91 (33)	93 (34)	92 (33)	89 (32)	83 (28)	72 (22)	63 (17)	93 (34)
Mean maximum °F (°C)	45.3 (7.4)	47.5 (8.6)	55.0 (12.8)	70.5 (21.4)	79.9 (26.6)	84.5 (29.2)	85.1 (29.5)	83.6 (28.7)	80.6 (27.0)	71.6 (22.0)	61.1 (16.2)	49.4 (9.7)	87.0 (30.6)
Mean daily maximum °F (°C)	22.4 (−5.3)	25.2 (−3.8)	34.2 (1.2)	47.1 (8.4)	61.5 (16.4)	70.4 (21.3)	75.0 (23.9)	73.6 (23.1)	66.4 (19.1)	52.8 (11.6)	39.9 (4.4)	28.7 (−1.8)	49.8 (9.9)
Daily mean °F (°C)	11.1 (−11.6)	12.8 (−10.7)	21.9 (−5.6)	36.3 (2.4)	49.9 (9.9)	59.3 (15.2)	64.2 (17.9)	62.7 (17.1)	55.1 (12.8)	43.5 (6.4)	31.8 (−0.1)	19.9 (−6.7)	39.0 (3.9)
Mean daily minimum °F (°C)	−0.3 (−17.9)	0.4 (−17.6)	9.6 (−12.4)	25.5 (−3.6)	38.3 (3.5)	48.3 (9.1)	53.4 (11.9)	51.7 (10.9)	43.9 (6.6)	34.1 (1.2)	23.7 (−4.6)	11.1 (−11.6)	28.3 (−2.0)
Mean minimum °F (°C)	−27.0 (−32.8)	−24.6 (−31.4)	−18.5 (−28.1)	6.6 (−14.1)	25.1 (−3.8)	32.6 (0.3)	40.7 (4.8)	38.4 (3.6)	28.7 (−1.8)	19.6 (−6.9)	4.6 (−15.2)	−14.0 (−25.6)	−30.0 (−34.4)
Record low °F (°C)	−44 (−42)	−45 (−43)	−36 (−38)	−17 (−27)	14 (−10)	25 (−4)	29 (−2)	28 (−2)	18 (−8)	8 (−13)	−13 (−25)	−44 (−42)	−45 (−43)
Average precipitation inches (mm)	3.02 (77)	2.37 (60)	3.04 (77)	3.60 (91)	4.47 (114)	5.14 (131)	4.91 (125)	4.76 (121)	4.00 (102)	4.63 (118)	3.62 (92)	3.57 (91)	47.13 (1,199)
Average snowfall inches (cm)	30.3 (77)	28.4 (72)	24.6 (62)	9.7 (25)	1.0 (2.5)	0.0 (0.0)	0.0 (0.0)	0.0 (0.0)	0.0 (0.0)	2.5 (6.4)	14.6 (37)	31.9 (81)	143.0 (363)
Average extreme snow depth inches (cm)	22.3 (57)	27.9 (71)	29.4 (75)	16.9 (43)	0.9 (2.3)	0.0 (0.0)	0.0 (0.0)	0.0 (0.0)	0.0 (0.0)	1.2 (3.0)	6.9 (18)	14.9 (38)	30.6 (78)
Average precipitation days (≥ 0.01 in)	18.3	14.6	15.2	15.0	14.6	15.2	14.8	14.1	12.1	15.5	16.7	19.3	185.4
Average snowy days (≥ 0.1 in)	16.8	13.5	11.5	5.3	0.7	0.0	0.0	0.0	0.0	1.7	8.6	15.5	73.6
Source 1: NOAA
Source 2: National Weather Service

== Demographics ==
Historical population
Census	Pop.	Note	%±
1840	315		—
1850	425		34.9%
1860	413		−2.8%
1870	400		−3.1%
1880	581		45.3%
1890	609		4.8%
1900	687		12.8%
1910	624		−9.2%
1920	1,311		110.1%
1930	671		−48.8%
1940	820		22.2%
1950	697		−15.0%
1960	639		−8.3%
1970	726		13.6%
1980	780		7.4%
1990	901		15.5%
2000	867		−3.8%
2010	869		0.2%
2020	800		−7.9%
U.S. Decennial Census

As of the census of 2000, there were 867 people, 386 households, and 264 families residing in the town. The population density was 3.1 people per square mile (1.2/km^{2}). There were 1,281 housing units at an average density of 4.5 per square mile (1.8/km^{2}). The racial makeup of the town was 98.27% White, 0.12% African American, 0.58% Native American, 0.23% from other races, and 0.81% from two or more races. Hispanic or Latino of any race were 0.46% of the population.

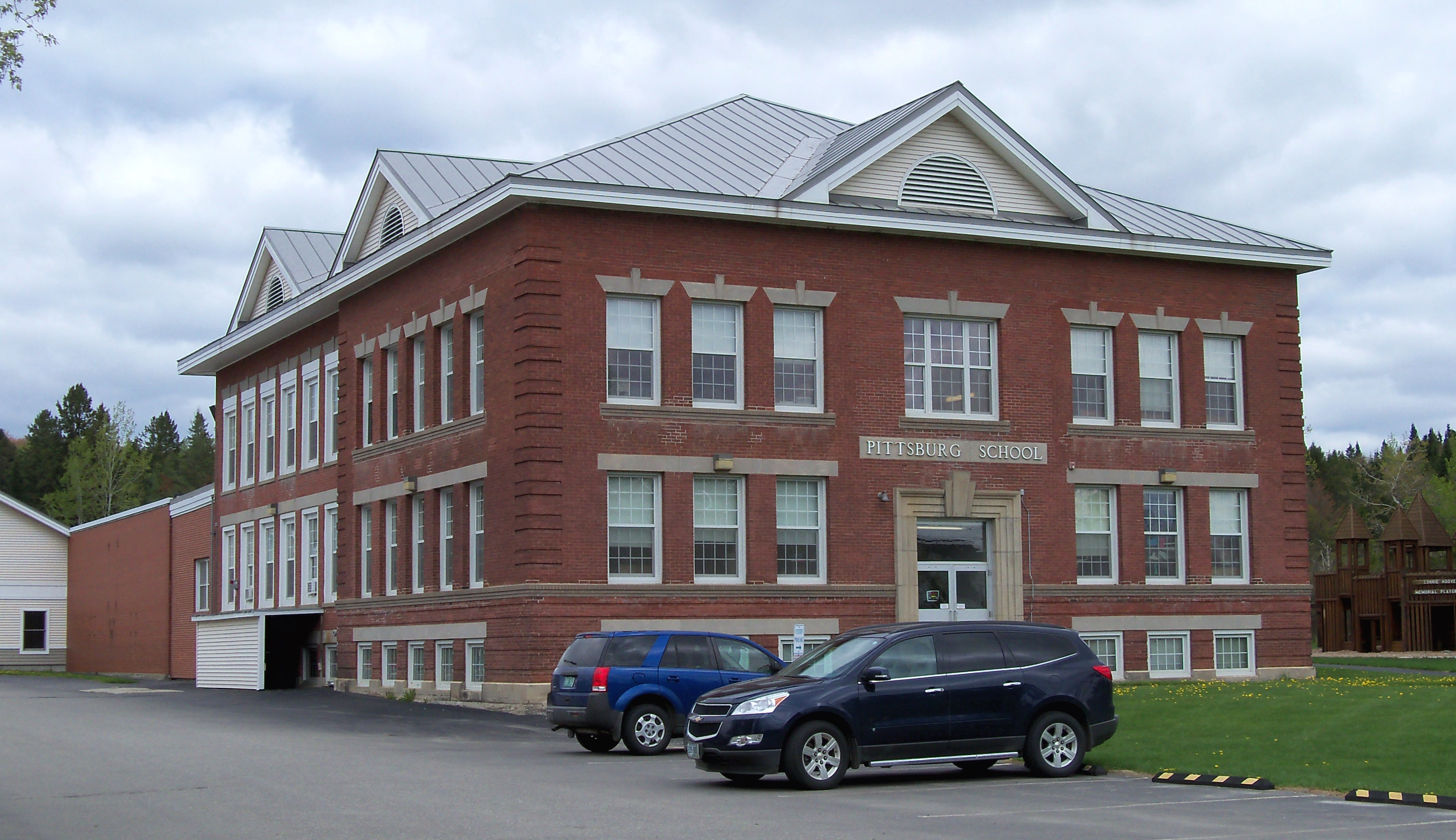
Pittsburg School

There were 386 households, out of which 22.3% had children under the age of 18 living with them, 59.1% were married couples living together, 4.4% had a female householder with no husband present, and 31.6% were non-families. 26.7% of all households were made up of individuals, and 14.8% had someone living alone who was 65 years of age or older. The average household size was 2.24 and the average family size was 2.67.

In the town, the population was spread out, with 18.9% under the age of 18, 5.4% from 18 to 24, 23.8% from 25 to 44, 32.9% from 45 to 64, and 19.0% who were 65 years of age or older. The median age was 46 years. For every 100 females, there were 105.9 males. For every 100 females age 18 and over, there were 105.6 males.

The median income for a household in the town was $38,516, and the median income for a family was $42,500. Males had a median income of $31,250 versus $25,455 for females. The per capita income for the town was $17,703. About 5.0% of families and 7.4% of the population were below the poverty line, including 7.8% of those under age 18 and 11.5% of those age 65 or over.

In 2014 the largest ancestry groups reported in Pittsburg were English (30.9%), French or French Canadian (21.0%), Irish (9.8%), and "American" (9.2%).

== Tourism ==
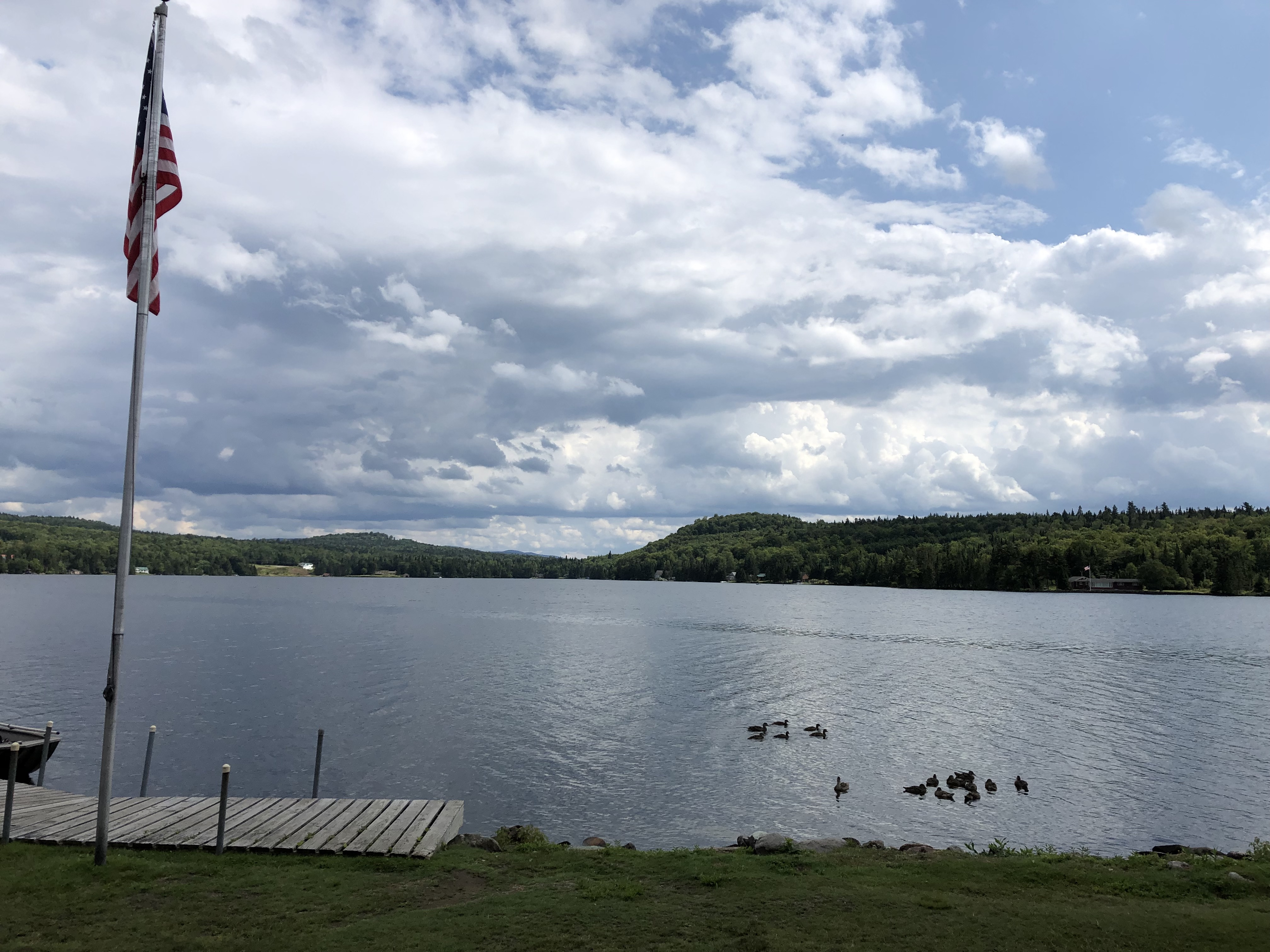
Looking south across Back Lake, August 2019

Pittsburg is a destination for snowmobile and ATV enthusiasts year round. In the winter months thousands of people visit Pittsburg to take advantage of the state-funded and club-supported and maintained trails that can bring snowmobilers from elsewhere in the state of New Hampshire to Pittsburg, with access to the states of Maine, Vermont and the border crossing to Canada. Some of the same trails are used in the summer for ATVs.

Another focus in the area for tourists is fishing and hunting. Pittsburg is home to the four Connecticut Lakes, Back Lake, part of Lake Francis, and numerous smaller water bodies. The lakes are annually stocked with fish and allow for fishing weekends. The area is known for fly fishing. Two sections of the Connecticut River are fly fishing only, including the "Trophy Stretch". The Connecticut Lakes Region has attracted anglers and hunters since the early 1900s. There are maps on the local snowmobile club's website that show trails in Pittsburg as well as roads and access points to the lakes and rivers.

Lake Francis State Park allows for lakeside camping, fishing, and canoeing on the lake or the Connecticut River. Deer Mountain Campground enables camping and picnicking on the Connecticut River.

Pittsburg fell within the path of totality during the solar eclipse of April 8, 2024.

== Notable people ==
- Edgar Aldrich (1848–1921), United States District Judge for the District of New Hampshire
- Harry B. Amey (1868–1949), United States Attorney for Vermont
- Luther Parker (1800–1853), political figure in the Republic of Indian Stream in the 1830s

== See also ==
- Connecticut Lakes State Forest
- Fourth Connecticut Lake Trail
