= Connecticut Lakes State Forest =

State forest in Coos County, New Hampshire

Coordinates: 45°12′4″N 71°11′42″W

- Location: Coös County, NH
- Nearest city: Pittsburg, New Hampshire
- Area: 1,648 acres (6.67 km^{2})
- Established: 1935
- Governing body: New Hampshire Department of Natural and Cultural Resources

Connecticut Lakes State Forest is a 1,648-acre (667 ha) state forest in the town of Pittsburg, New Hampshire, in the United States. The forest forms a narrow strip on either side of U.S. Route 3, running south from the Canadian border around Third and south past Second Connecticut Lake before ending up short of First Connecticut Lake. The area is known for its moose viewing opportunities in late spring and summer during the mornings and evenings, earning it the name nickname "Moose Alley".

== Climate ==
Stub Hill (New Hampshire) is a mountain peak in Connecticut Lakes State Forest, located 5 miles (8 km) east of First Connecticut Lake.

Climate data for Stub Hill 45.1077 N, 71.0986 W, Elevation: 3,406 ft (1,038 m) (1991–2020 normals)
Month	Jan	Feb	Mar	Apr	May	Jun	Jul	Aug	Sep	Oct	Nov	Dec	Year
Mean daily maximum °F (°C)	15.8 (−9.0)	18.1 (−7.7)	26.9 (−2.8)	42.4 (5.8)	55.9 (13.3)	64.9 (18.3)	69.4 (20.8)	68.3 (20.2)	61.7 (16.5)	48.5 (9.2)	32.5 (0.3)	22.3 (−5.4)	43.9 (6.6)
Daily mean °F (°C)	7.8 (−13.4)	9.7 (−12.4)	19.1 (−7.2)	33.1 (0.6)	46.9 (8.3)	56.2 (13.4)	60.8 (16.0)	59.4 (15.2)	52.2 (11.2)	38.9 (3.8)	26.4 (−3.1)	13.7 (−10.2)	35.3 (1.9)
Mean daily minimum °F (°C)	−0.3 (−17.9)	1.4 (−17.0)	11.3 (−11.5)	23.9 (−4.5)	37.9 (3.3)	47.4 (8.6)	52.1 (11.2)	50.5 (10.3)	42.6 (5.9)	29.3 (−1.5)	20.2 (−6.6)	5.2 (−14.9)	26.8 (−2.9)
Average precipitation inches (mm)	4.41 (112)	3.39 (86)	4.24 (108)	4.23 (107)	5.30 (135)	6.50 (165)	6.13 (156)	5.73 (146)	5.03 (128)	5.75 (146)	4.58 (116)	4.74 (120)	60.03 (1,525)
Source: PRISM Climate Group

== See also ==
- List of New Hampshire state forests
