= Connecticut Lakes =

Group of four lakes in northern New Hampshire, United States

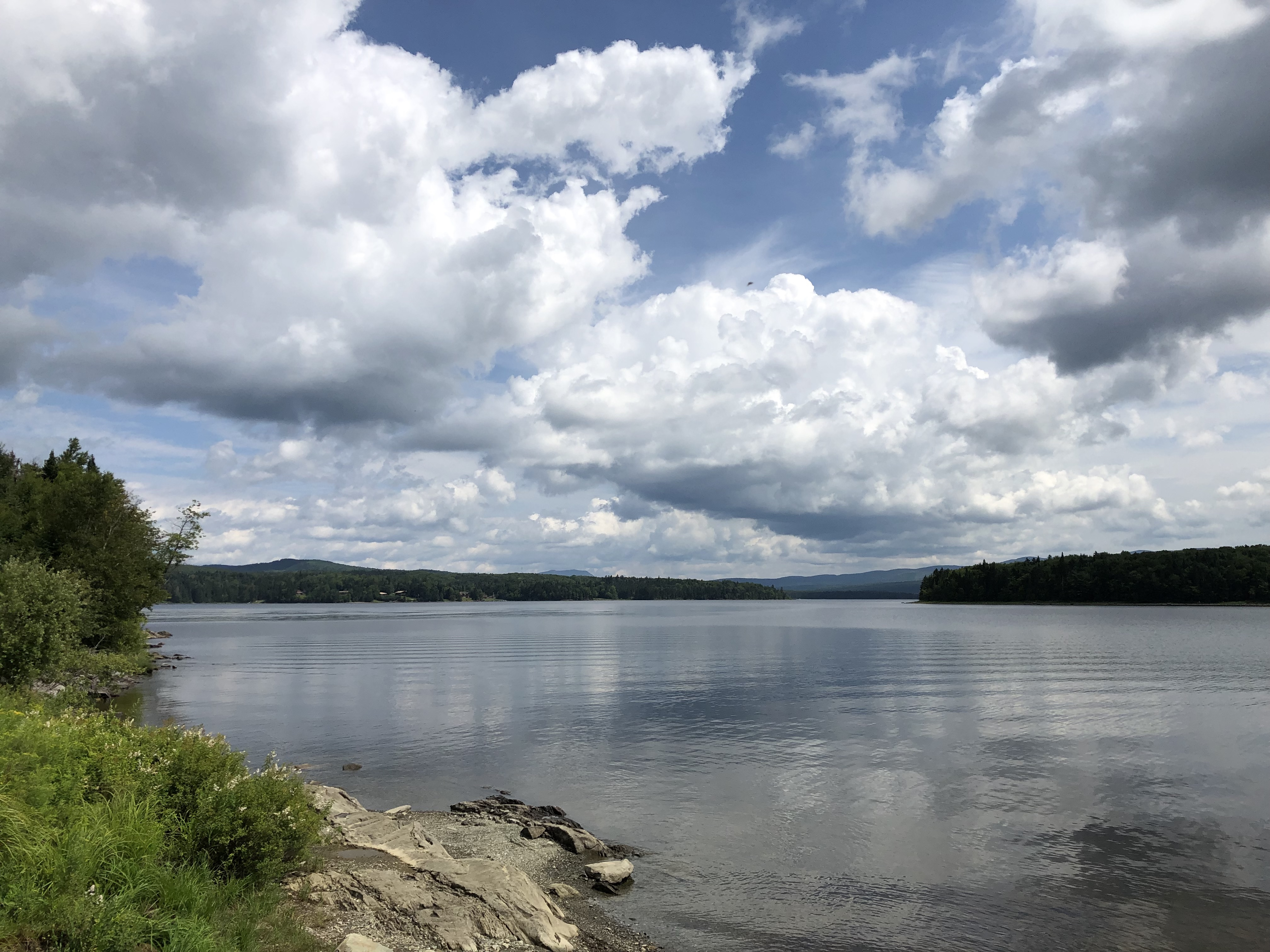
View across a section of First Connecticut Lake

The Connecticut Lakes are a group of lakes in Coos County, northern New Hampshire, United States, situated along the headwaters of the Connecticut River. They are accessed via the northernmost segment of U.S. Route 3, between the village of Pittsburg and the Canada port of entry south of Chartierville, Quebec. The lakes are located within the boundaries of Pittsburg, but are far from the town center. Connecticut Lakes State Forest adjoins them.

There are four lakes: First, Second, Third and Fourth Connecticut Lake, numerically running south to north. The lakes decrease in size and increase in elevation, sequentially from first to fourth. The fourth lake is the source of the Connecticut River. The first three lakes can be viewed and accessed from U.S. Route 3, while the only access to the fourth lake is via the Fourth Connecticut Lake Trail, which goes in and out of Canada. All lakes are north of the 45th parallel.

Lake Francis lies to the south of the four Connecticut Lakes. It is a man-made reservoir and the last of the major lakes along the Connecticut River in northern New Hampshire.

== The lakes ==
=== First Connecticut Lake ===
First Connecticut Lake
- Location within New Hampshire
- Location: Coos County, New Hampshire
- Coordinates: 45°5′37″N 71°14′52″W
- Primary inflows: Connecticut River
- Primary outflows: Connecticut River
- Basin countries: United States
- Max. length: 5.3 mi (8.5 km)
- Max. width: 2.7 mi (4.3 km)
- Surface area: 3,071 acres (1,243 ha)
- Average depth: 56 ft (17 m)
- Max. depth: 163 ft (50 m)
- Surface elevation: 1,638 ft (499 m)
- Settlements: Pittsburg

First Connecticut Lake is located in the town of Pittsburg, 7 miles (11 km) northeast of the village center. At 3,071 acres (1,243 ha), it is the eighth-largest lake located entirely in New Hampshire. It is the lowest in elevation and largest in surface area of the four Connecticut Lakes.

Fish species include landlocked salmon and lake trout. The lake has average and maximum depths of 56 feet (17 m) and 163 feet (50 m), respectively. There are three public boat launch locations, and ice fishing is permitted from January through March. Outflow of the lake into the Connecticut River is controlled via the First Lake Dam, located near U.S. Route 3 at the southwestern shore.

A marker along the southwestern shore of the lake commemorates Luther Parker, a historical figure of the Republic of Indian Stream in the 1830s.

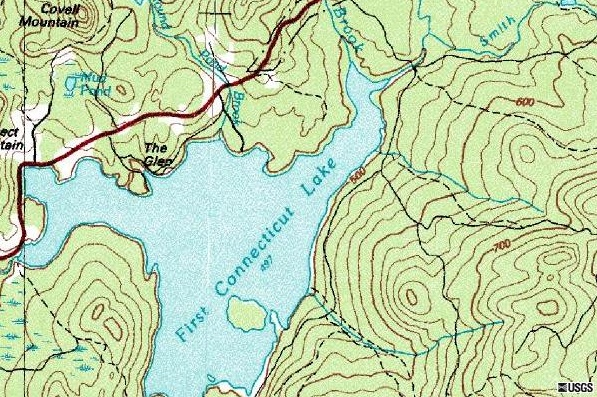
Topographic map of First Connecticut Lake

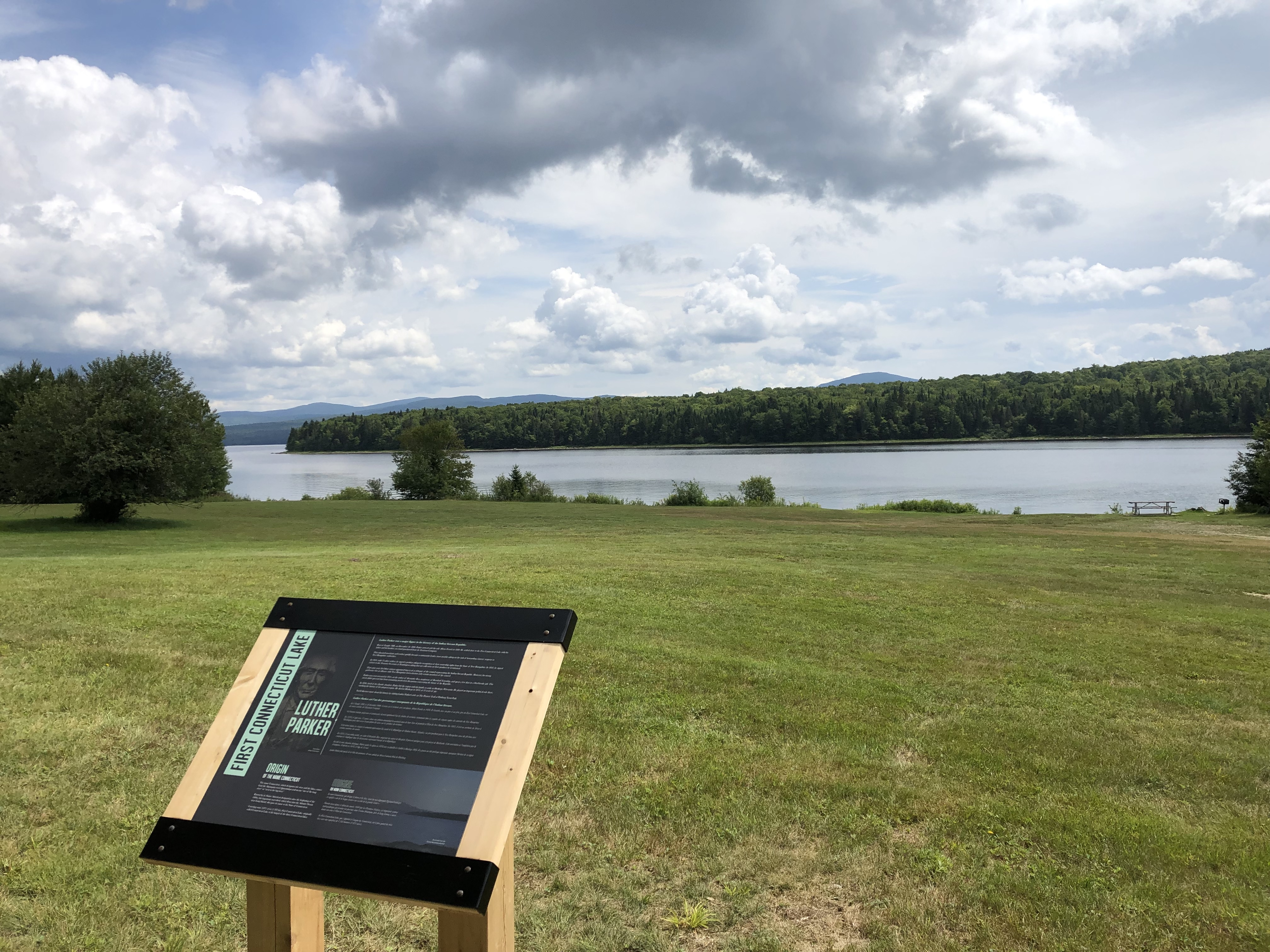
Marker for Luther Parker at First Connecticut Lake

=== Second Connecticut Lake ===
Second Connecticut Lake
- Location within New Hampshire
- Location: Coos County, New Hampshire
- Coordinates: 45°9′23″N 71°10′14″W
- Primary inflows: Connecticut River
- Primary outflows: Connecticut River
- Basin countries: United States
- Max. length: 3.1 mi (5.0 km)
- Max. width: 1.3 mi (2.1 km)
- Surface area: 1,102 acres (4 km^{2})
- Average depth: 20 ft (6.1 m)
- Max. depth: 63 ft (19 m)
- Surface elevation: 1,866 ft (569 m)
- Islands: 3
- Settlements: Pittsburg

Second Connecticut Lake, known in the past as Lake Carmel, is a 1,102-acre (446 ha) water body in the town of Pittsburg, 15 miles (24 km) northeast of the village center. The second lake is 228 feet (69 m) higher in elevation than the first lake, and shallower.

Fish species include brook trout, landlocked salmon, and lake trout. There is one public boat launch location, and ice fishing is permitted from January through March. Outflow of the lake into the Connecticut River is controlled via the Second Lake Dam, located near U.S. Route 3 at the southwestern shore.

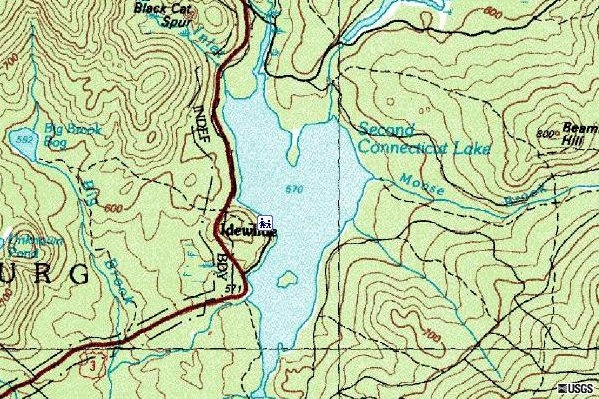
Topographic map of Second Connecticut Lake

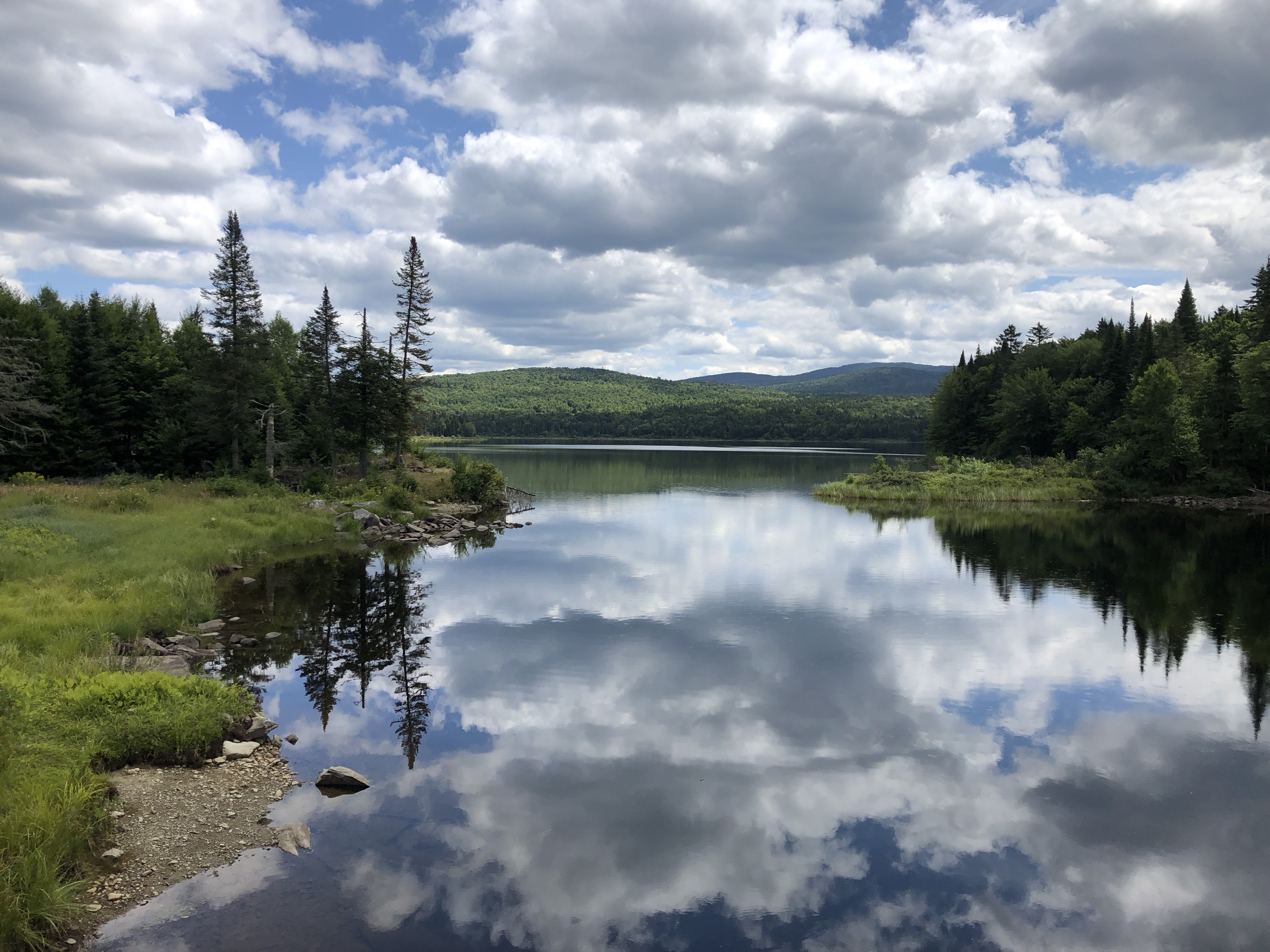
Second Connecticut Lake near the Second Lake Dam

=== Third Connecticut Lake ===
Third Connecticut Lake
- Location within New Hampshire
- Location: Coos County, New Hampshire
- Coordinates: 45°14′15″N 71°12′0″W
- Primary inflows: Connecticut River
- Primary outflows: Connecticut River
- Basin countries: United States
- Max. length: 1.1 mi (1.8 km)
- Max. width: 0.5 mi (0.80 km)
- Surface area: 231 acres (93 ha)
- Average depth: 42 ft (13 m)
- Max. depth: 101 ft (31 m)
- Surface elevation: 2,188 ft (667 m)
- Settlements: Pittsburg

Third Connecticut Lake, at one time known as Lake St. Sophia, is a 231-acre (93 ha) water body in the town of Pittsburg, situated 20 miles (32 km) northeast of the village center, and less than 1 mile (1.6 km) south of the Canadian border. It reaches a maximum depth of approximately 100 feet (30 m), and sits 322 feet (98 m) higher in elevation than the second lake.

Fish species include rainbow trout and lake trout. There is one public boat launch location, off of U.S. Route 3 along the eastern shore of the lake. Ice fishing is permitted from January through March.

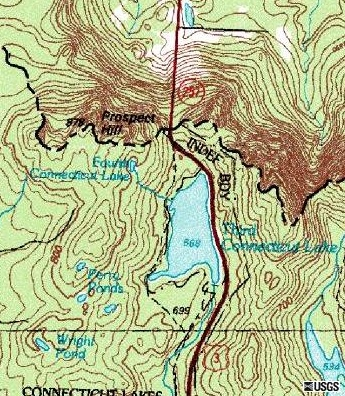
Topographic map of the Third and Fourth Connecticut Lakes

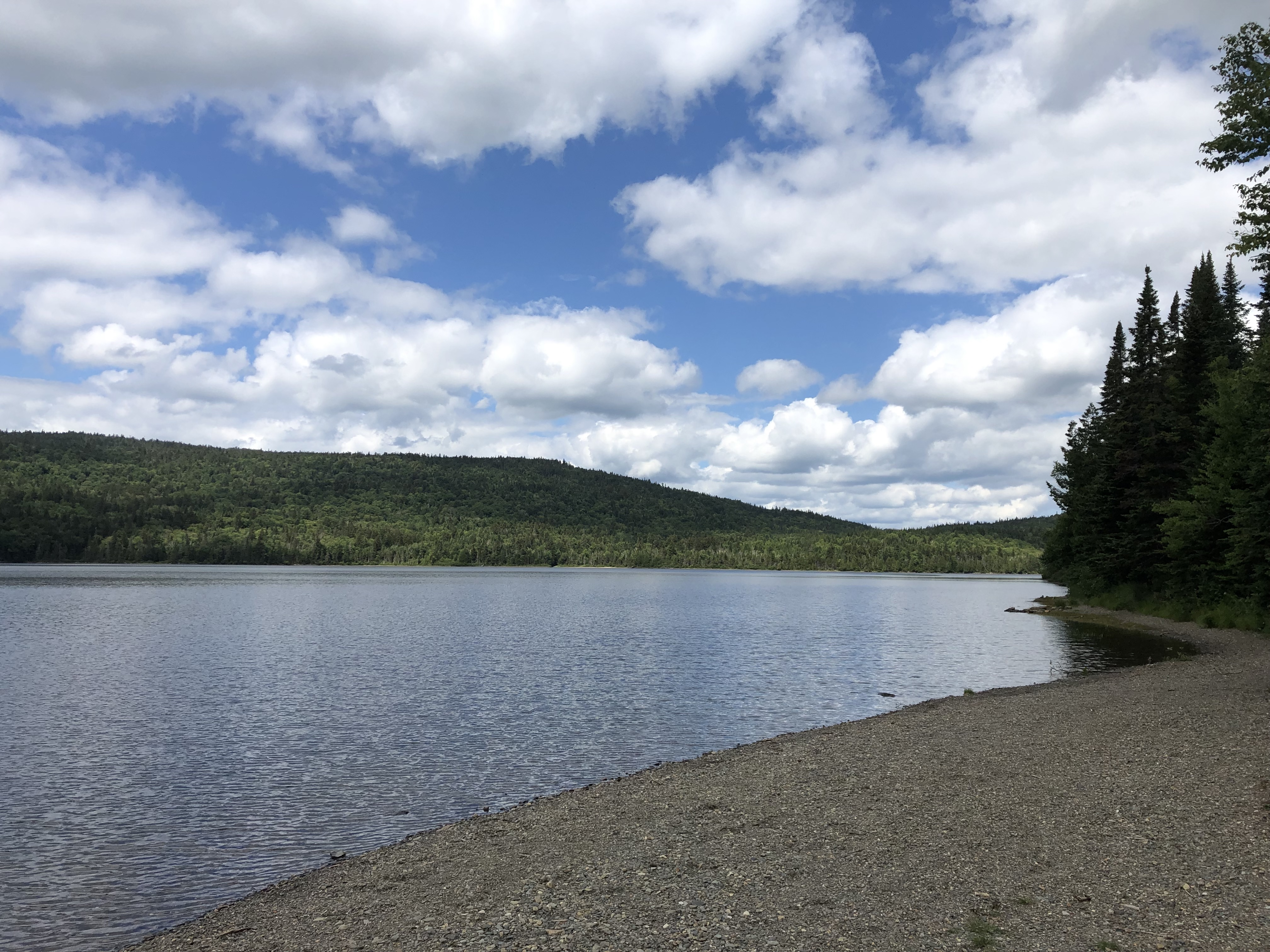
Third Connecticut Lake near the public boat launch along U.S. Route 3

=== Fourth Connecticut Lake ===
Fourth Connecticut Lake
- Location within New Hampshire
- Location: Coos County, New Hampshire
- Coordinates: 45°14′52″N 71°12′52″W
- Primary outflows: Connecticut River
- Basin countries: United States
- Max. length: 0.1 m (3.9 in)
- Surface area: 1.8 acres (0.73 ha)
- Surface elevation: 2,670 ft (810 m)
- Settlements: Pittsburg

Fourth Connecticut Lake is the northernmost and most remote of the Connecticut Lakes; it is also the smallest, at 1.8 acres (0.73 ha). It is the source of the Connecticut River, and is situated in the town of Pittsburg, 0.5 miles (0.80 km) upstream from and 482 feet (147 m) higher than Third Connecticut Lake. The fourth lake is immediately to the northwest of the third lake. The Fourth Connecticut Lake Trail leads hikers to the lake.

==== Fourth Connecticut Lake Trail ====
The Fourth Connecticut Lake Trail is a public trail maintained by The Nature Conservancy that criss-crosses the international border between New Hampshire and Quebec for 0.6 miles (0.97 km) ending with a 0.5-mile (0.80 km) loop around the Fourth Connecticut Lake. It is one of the few international trails in North America. The land surrounding the lake is owned by The Nature Conservancy.

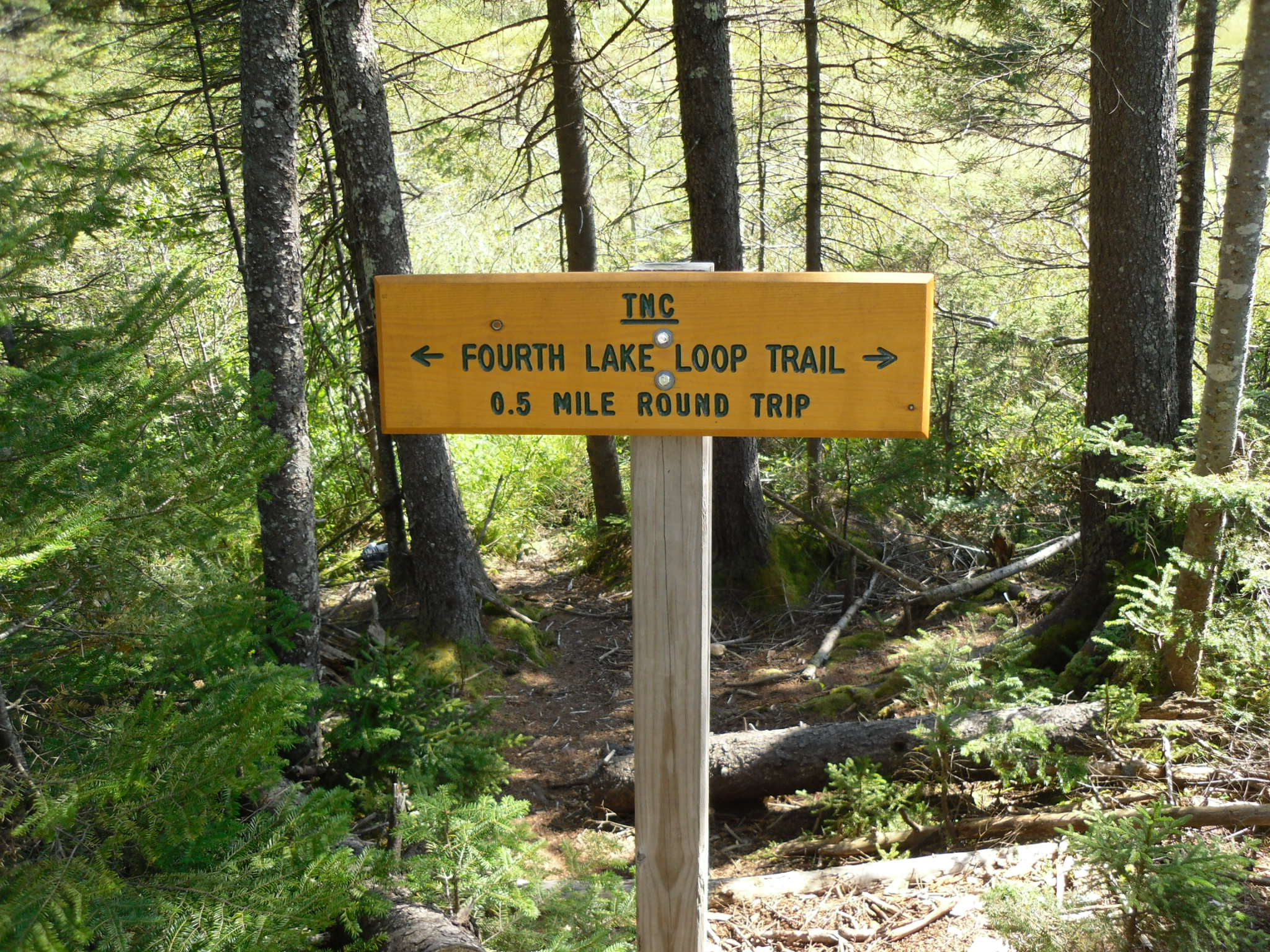
Trail sign

The parking area for hikers is at the American facility of the Pittsburg–Chartierville Border Crossing, located 22 miles (35 km) north of the Pittsburg town center via U.S. Route 3. The trail begins about 50 yards (46 m) to the right of the American building, with a small kiosk at the trailhead.

The trail has no cell phone coverage, requires some non-technical climbing, and starts at a good elevation—hikers should be prepared, even in summer. Pets are not allowed on the trail, and no camping, hunting, or fishing is allowed.

For persons starting in the United States, passports are not needed to hike the trail as, even though parts of the trail are in Canada, the trail starts and ends on the American side of the international border. For persons starting in Canada, a passport or other border crossing document would be required in order to enter the United States at the border facility before hiking the trail.

== Climate ==
According to the Köppen Climate Classification system, First Connecticut Lake has a warm-summer humid continental climate, abbreviated "Dfb" on climate maps. The hottest temperature recorded at First Connecticut Lake was 93 °F (33.9 °C) on July 8, 1921 and July 19, 1953, while the coldest temperature recorded was −45 °F (−42.8 °C) on February 1, 1920.

Climate data for First Connecticut Lake, New Hampshire, 1991–2020 normals, extremes 1918–present
Month	Jan	Feb	Mar	Apr	May	Jun	Jul	Aug	Sep	Oct	Nov	Dec	Year
Record high °F (°C)	60 (16)	64 (18)	77 (25)	83 (28)	91 (33)	91 (33)	93 (34)	92 (33)	89 (32)	83 (28)	73 (23)	63 (17)	93 (34)
Mean maximum °F (°C)	45.3 (7.4)	47.5 (8.6)	55.0 (12.8)	70.5 (21.4)	79.9 (26.6)	84.5 (29.2)	85.1 (29.5)	83.6 (28.7)	80.6 (27.0)	71.6 (22.0)	61.1 (16.2)	49.4 (9.7)	87.0 (30.6)
Mean daily maximum °F (°C)	22.4 (−5.3)	25.2 (−3.8)	34.2 (1.2)	47.1 (8.4)	61.5 (16.4)	70.4 (21.3)	75.0 (23.9)	73.6 (23.1)	66.4 (19.1)	52.8 (11.6)	39.9 (4.4)	28.7 (−1.8)	49.8 (9.9)
Daily mean °F (°C)	11.1 (−11.6)	12.8 (−10.7)	21.9 (−5.6)	36.3 (2.4)	49.9 (9.9)	59.3 (15.2)	64.2 (17.9)	62.7 (17.1)	55.1 (12.8)	43.5 (6.4)	31.8 (−0.1)	19.9 (−6.7)	39.0 (3.9)
Mean daily minimum °F (°C)	−0.3 (−17.9)	0.4 (−17.6)	9.6 (−12.4)	25.5 (−3.6)	38.3 (3.5)	48.3 (9.1)	53.4 (11.9)	51.7 (10.9)	43.9 (6.6)	34.1 (1.2)	23.7 (−4.6)	11.1 (−11.6)	28.3 (−2.0)
Mean minimum °F (°C)	−27.0 (−32.8)	−24.6 (−31.4)	−18.5 (−28.1)	6.6 (−14.1)	25.1 (−3.8)	32.6 (0.3)	40.7 (4.8)	38.4 (3.6)	28.7 (−1.8)	19.6 (−6.9)	4.6 (−15.2)	−14.0 (−25.6)	−30.0 (−34.4)
Record low °F (°C)	−44 (−42)	−45 (−43)	−36 (−38)	−17 (−27)	14 (−10)	25 (−4)	29 (−2)	28 (−2)	18 (−8)	8 (−13)	−13 (−25)	−44 (−42)	−45 (−43)
Average precipitation inches (mm)	3.02 (77)	2.37 (60)	3.04 (77)	3.60 (91)	4.47 (114)	5.14 (131)	4.91 (125)	4.76 (121)	4.00 (102)	4.63 (118)	3.62 (92)	3.57 (91)	47.13 (1,199)
Average snowfall inches (cm)	30.3 (77)	28.4 (72)	24.6 (62)	9.7 (25)	1.0 (2.5)	0.0 (0.0)	0.0 (0.0)	0.0 (0.0)	0.0 (0.0)	2.5 (6.4)	14.6 (37)	31.9 (81)	143.0 (363)
Average extreme snow depth inches (cm)	22.3 (57)	27.9 (71)	29.4 (75)	16.9 (43)	0.9 (2.3)	0.0 (0.0)	0.0 (0.0)	0.0 (0.0)	0.0 (0.0)	1.2 (3.0)	6.9 (18)	14.9 (38)	30.6 (78)
Average precipitation days (≥ 0.01 in)	18.3	14.6	15.2	15.0	14.6	15.2	14.8	14.1	12.1	15.5	16.7	19.3	185.4
Average snowy days (≥ 0.1 in)	16.8	13.5	11.5	5.3	0.7	0.0	0.0	0.0	0.0	1.7	8.6	15.5	73.6
Source 1: NOAA
Source 2: National Weather Service

== Connecticut Lakes Natural Area ==
USGS map of First, Second, and Third Connecticut Lakes (bottom to top)

The 25,000 acres (10,000 ha) surrounding the lakes was set aside as a land conservation project in 2002 by the New Hampshire Fish and Game Department. The protected area is within the towns of Clarksville and Pittsburg, up to the border with Canada.

== See also ==
- List of lakes in New Hampshire
