= Pequawket (disambiguation) =

The Pequawket were a Native-American tribe around the Maine-New Hampshire border. They have since gone extinct.

Pequawket may also refer to the following places in the US:

== Maine ==
- Pequawket Lake

== New Hampshire ==
- Kearsarge North, also known as Pequawket
- Pequawket Brook
- Pequawket Fire Tower
- Pequawket Ponds
