= WPQR =

- Conway, New Hampshire; United States
- Broadcast area: Mount Washington Valley
- Frequency: 1050 kHz

Ownership
- Owner: Mt. Washington Radio & Gramophone, L.L.C.
- Sister stations: WBNC; WMWV; WVMJ

History
- First air date: December 21, 1955
- Last air date: October 17, 2012
- Former call signs: WJWG (1955–1957); WBNC (1957–2012); WPQR (2012–2013)

Technical information
- Facility ID: 49203
- Class: D
- Power: 1,000 watts (day); 63 watts (night)
- Transmitter coordinates: 43°58′48.3″N 71°6′37.2″W
- Translator: 95.3 W237BX (North Conway)

WPQR (1050 AM) was a radio station licensed to Conway, New Hampshire, United States, serving the Mount Washington Valley of the White Mountains. The station was last owned by Mt. Washington Radio & Gramophone, L.L.C. It carried a tourist information format (similar to highway advisory radio) with a simulcast on FM translator W237BX (95.3) in North Conway.

AM 1050 is a clear channel frequency. For much of its history, WPQR (previously WBNC) had been a daytimer, required to go off the air at night because of that. Two 50,000–watt stations, CHUM in Toronto and WEPN in New York City, dominate the frequency in New England at night. While WPQR transmitted 1,000 watts by day, it eventually was permitted by the Federal Communications Commission (FCC) to stay on the air at night with 63 watts.

WPQR went dark on October 17, 2012, along with its translator, W237BX. The tourist information format, call letters and FM translator were then transferred to the new station on 1340 kHz (then WPQR) which picked up the WBNC call sign. The translator remained W237BX. WPQR's license was deleted on November 14, 2013, after being surrendered by the licensee on November 6, 2013.
