= Pequawket Ponds =

Group of ponds in Albany, Conway, and Madison, NH

Pequawket Pond
- Satellite view of Pequawket Pond, courtesy of the USGS
- Location: Conway and Albany, New Hampshire
- Type: Lake
- Etymology: Native American tribe
- Primary inflows: Pequawket Brook
- Basin countries: United States
- Surface area: 120 acres (49 ha)
- Average depth: 13 ft (4.0 m)
- Max. depth: 54 ft (16 m)
- Surface elevation: 456 ft (139 m)
- Islands: 0
- Settlements: Albany, Conway

The Pequawket Ponds are a group of freshwater lakes and ponds in the towns of Albany, Conway, and Madison, New Hampshire, United States. The ponds are part of the Saco River watershed, being fed by Pequawket Brook, which, shortly after exiting Pequawket Pond, meets the Swift River, a Saco River tributary. Pequawket Pond's main peninsula makes up the Pequawket Pond Reserve.

== Geography ==
Pequawket Pond is located near the Conway town center, on the border of Albany. It is fed by Pequawket Brook, a Swift River tributary. It is situated north of Upper Pequawket Pond, located upstream along New Hampshire Route 113.

Upper Pequawket Pond
- Satellite view of Upper Pequawket Pond (center) and Tight Pond (bottom), courtesy of the USGS
- Location: Madison, New Hampshire
- Group: Pequawket Ponds
- Type: Pond
- Etymology: Native American tribe
- Primary inflows: Pequawket Brook
- Basin countries: United States
- Surface area: 20 acres (8.1 ha)
- Max. depth: 15 ft (4.6 m)
- Surface elevation: 459 ft (140 m)
- Islands: 0
- Settlements: Madison

Upper Pequawket Pond is located along New Hampshire Route 113, north of Tight Pond and northeast of Ledge Pond. It is located northwest of Oak Hill, and is fed and drained by Pequawket Brook. Ledge Pond Road runs to the west of the pond.

== Hydrology ==
Pequawket Pond is 54 feet (16 m), and covers 120 acres (49 ha) in surface area. It is classified as a warm/cold water fishery, and is a freshwater lake. Upper Pequawket Pond is a marshier water body, and is known for birding.

== Ecology ==
Pequawket Pond is a deep lake, and is classified as a warm/cold water fishery. Some example of fish species there include largemouth bass, yellow perch, and chain pickerel. Upper Pequawket Pond is reported to have the same types of fish.

== Recreation ==
Pequawket Pond offers recreational activities such as boating, swimming, and sunbathing. A boat launch is located on Pequawket Pond, and so are public beaches. Fishing at Pequawket Pond is also a recreational activity there. Upper Pequawket Pond has no beaches, and is mainly a marsh. Fishing can be done at Upper Pequawket Pond, however. The main lake is part of the 24-acre (9.7 ha) Pequawket Pond Reserve, a recreational park composed of the entire main peninsula.

== See also ==
- Pequawket Brook
- Conway, New Hampshire
- List of lakes of New Hampshire
