= Black Cap (mountain) =

Mountain in Conway, New Hampshire, United States

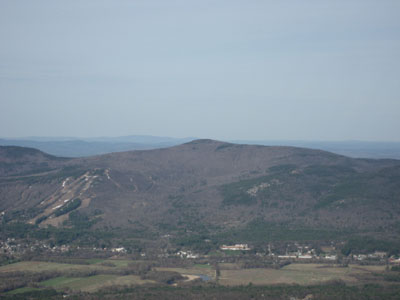
- Black Cap as seen from Middle Moat Mountain

Highest point
- Elevation: 2,369 ft (722 m)
- Coordinates: 44°03′21″N 71°04′00″W

Geography
- Location: Conway, New Hampshire
- Topo map: USGS North Conway East

Black Cap is a mountain located in the town of Conway, New Hampshire, United States. It is located between Kearsarge North Mountain and Peaked Mountain. The rocky summit provides views of Maine and New Hampshire's White Mountains. Cranmore Mountain Resort is located on its western subpeak, Cranmore Mountain.

== Background ==
Black Cap is part of a north-south-trending ridge known as the Green Hills. The next summit to the north on the ridge (towards Kearsarge North) is 2,100-foot (640 m) Hurricane Mountain, and to the southwest is 1,857-foot (566 m) Middle Mountain. Black Cap is located entirely in the watershed of the Saco River, which flows to the Gulf of Maine (Atlantic Ocean) near Saco, Maine. Tributaries of the Saco that flow off the mountain include Artist Brook to the west, Mason Brook to the south, White Lot Brook to the southeast, and Weeks Brook to the east.

Along the trail that leads to the top of Black Cap from Hurricane Mountain, there is a mountain biking trail created by NEMBA (New England Mountain Bike Association) called the Red Tail Trail. This trail descends further down Black Cap and Hurricane Mountain. It lets out near the intersection of Kearsarge Street and Hurricane Mountain Road (on the western side of Hurricane Mountain.)

== See also ==
- Mountain peaks of North America
