= WBNC =

- Conway, New Hampshire; United States
- Broadcast area: Mount Washington Valley
- Frequency: 1340 kHz
- Branding: Easy 95.3

Programming
- Language: English
- Format: Soft adult contemporary

Ownership
- Owner: Conway Broadcasting, LLC
- Sister stations: WMWV; WVMJ

History
- First air date: 2012
- Former call signs: WFRG (10/24-25/2012); WPQR (10/25-11/27/2012)
- Call sign meaning: "Beautiful North Conway"

Technical information
- Licensing authority: FCC
- Facility ID: 161077
- Class: C
- Power: 620 watts
- Transmitter coordinates: 43°58′48.3″N 71°6′37.2″W
- Translator: 95.3 W237BX (North Conway)

Links
- Public license information: Public file; LMS

WBNC (1340 AM; "Easy 95.3") is a radio station licensed to serve Conway, New Hampshire, United States. It is owned by Mt. Washington Radio & Gramophone, L.L.C. which also owns WMWV and WVMJ. WBNC is a class C (local) station. It was granted a license to cover on December 7, 2012. When it came on the air, it inherited the WBNC calls, tourist information format and FM translator W237BX (95.3) from sister station WPQR, which was taken silent.

On March 17, 2017, WBNC changed their format from travelers information to soft adult contemporary, branded as "Easy 95.3".
