= Donald Philbrick =

American politician (1937–2022)

Donald R. Philbrick (August 14, 1937 – January 18, 2022) was an American politician.

Philbrick was born in Conway, New Hampshire, and graduated from Kennett High School. He went to DeVry University in Chicago. Philbrick then served in the United States Air Force from 1954 to 1976. Philbrick then lived with his wife in Eaton, New Hampshire. He served in the New Hampshire House of Representatives and was a Republican.

New Hampshire House of Representatives
| Preceded by Robert W. Foster; Allen R. Wiggin | Member of the New Hampshire House of Representatives from the 4th Carroll district 1992–2002 | Succeeded by Carolyn Brown; Gene G. Chandler; Howard C. Dickinson; Henry P. Mock |
| Preceded by David L. Babson, Jr; L. Randy Lyman | Member of the New Hampshire House of Representatives from the 5th Carroll district 2002–2004 | Succeeded by Jim Martin; J. Lisbeth Olimpio; Martha A. Pike |
| Preceded by District created | Member of the New Hampshire House of Representatives from the 2nd Carroll district 2004–2006 | Succeeded by Bob Bridgham |
