= Carroll Reed =

Ski instructor (1905–1995)

Carroll Reed (1905–1995) was a ski instructor and promoter of the sport of skiing in New Hampshire, United States. He was the developer of the Eastern Slope Ski School and among the developers of the Cranmore Mountain Resort in North Conway, New Hampshire. Carroll Reed, along with Bob Levy, purchased the North Conway railroad station and yard. The two brought in Dwight Smith and the three founded the Conway Scenic Railroad in 1974. Car #3234 is named after Carroll Reed.
