= Magic 104 =

Magic 104 may refer to:

- Magic 104, the former moniker of a radio station (104.1 FM), KMGL, licensed to Oklahoma City, Oklahoma, United States, which is now Magic 104.1
- Magic 104, the former moniker of a radio station (104.1 FM), WMRQ, licensed to Waterbury, Connecticut, United States, which is now Radio 104.1
- WVMJ, a radio station (104.5 FM) licensed to Conway, New Hampshire, United States
