= Kearsarge, New Hampshire =

Unincorporated community in New Hampshire, United States

- Unincorporated community
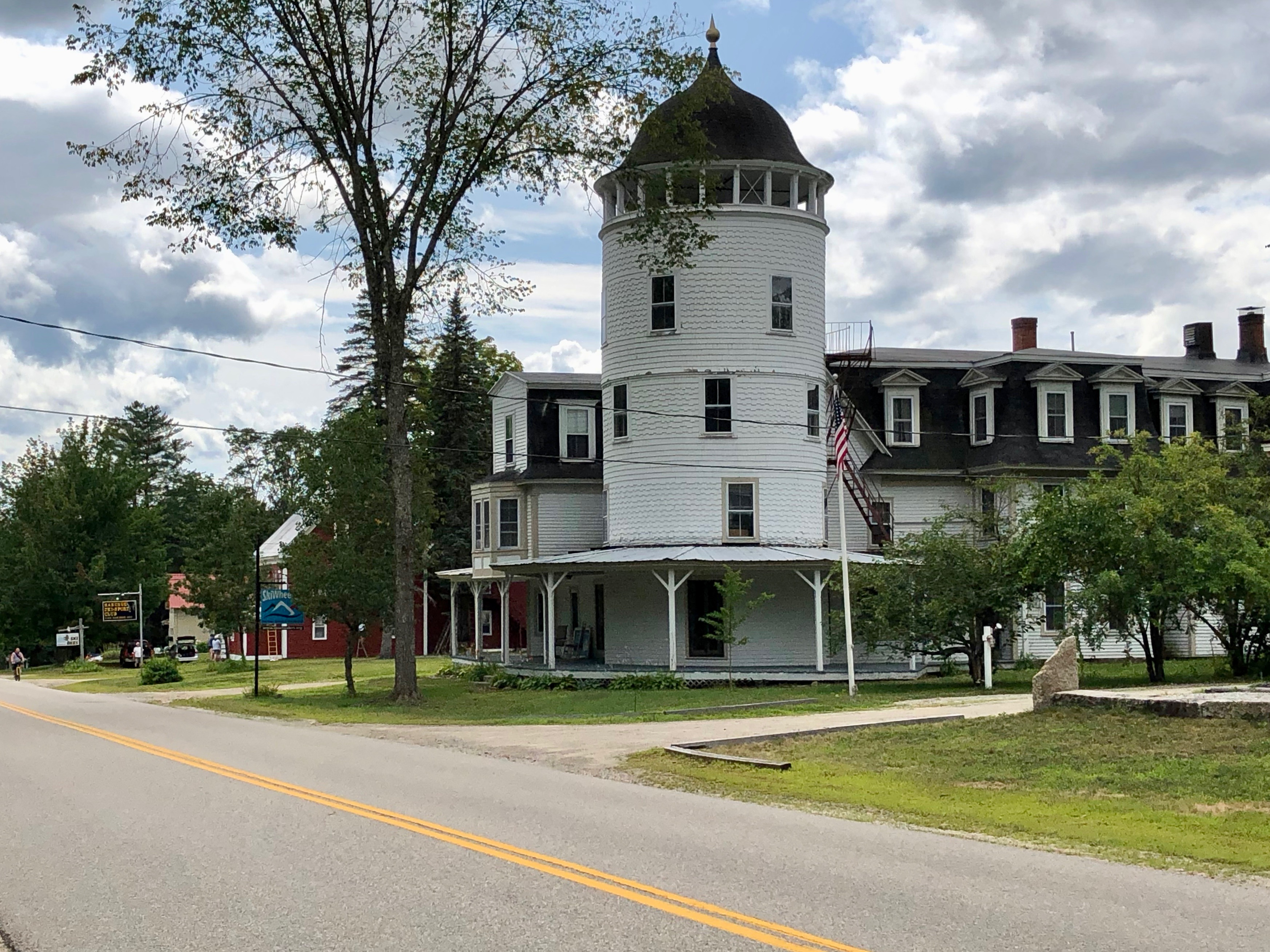
- Along Kearsarge Road

- Location within New Hampshire Location within the United States
- Coordinates: 44°04′26″N 71°07′01″W
- Country: United States
- State: New Hampshire
- County: Carroll
- Town: Conway
- Elevation: 676 ft (206 m)
- Time zone: UTC-5 (Eastern (EST))
  - Summer (DST): UTC-4 (EDT)
- ZIP code: 03847
- Area code: 603
- GNIS feature ID: 872124

Kearsarge is a community within the towns of Conway and Bartlett in Carroll County, New Hampshire, United States. It shares its name with Kearsarge North, a 3,268-foot (996 m) summit which overlooks the community from the north. It is 1.5 miles (2.4 km) north of the village of North Conway, with its center around the intersection of Kearsarge Road with Hurricane Mountain Road.

Kearsarge has a different ZIP code (03847) from North Conway, the town of Conway, and Bartlett, and shares a staffed post office with the community of Intervale. The U.S. Postal Service closed Kearsarge's former post office in March 2014 and relocated the post office boxes for the 03847 ZIP code to the Intervale post office. No new PO boxes will be issued in the 03847 ZIP code.

The Kearsarge Lighting Precinct, founded on May 29, 1957, overlays the municipal boundary between Conway and Bartlett and has the power to enact and enforce zoning regulations.
