= Leanne Smith =

American alpine skier

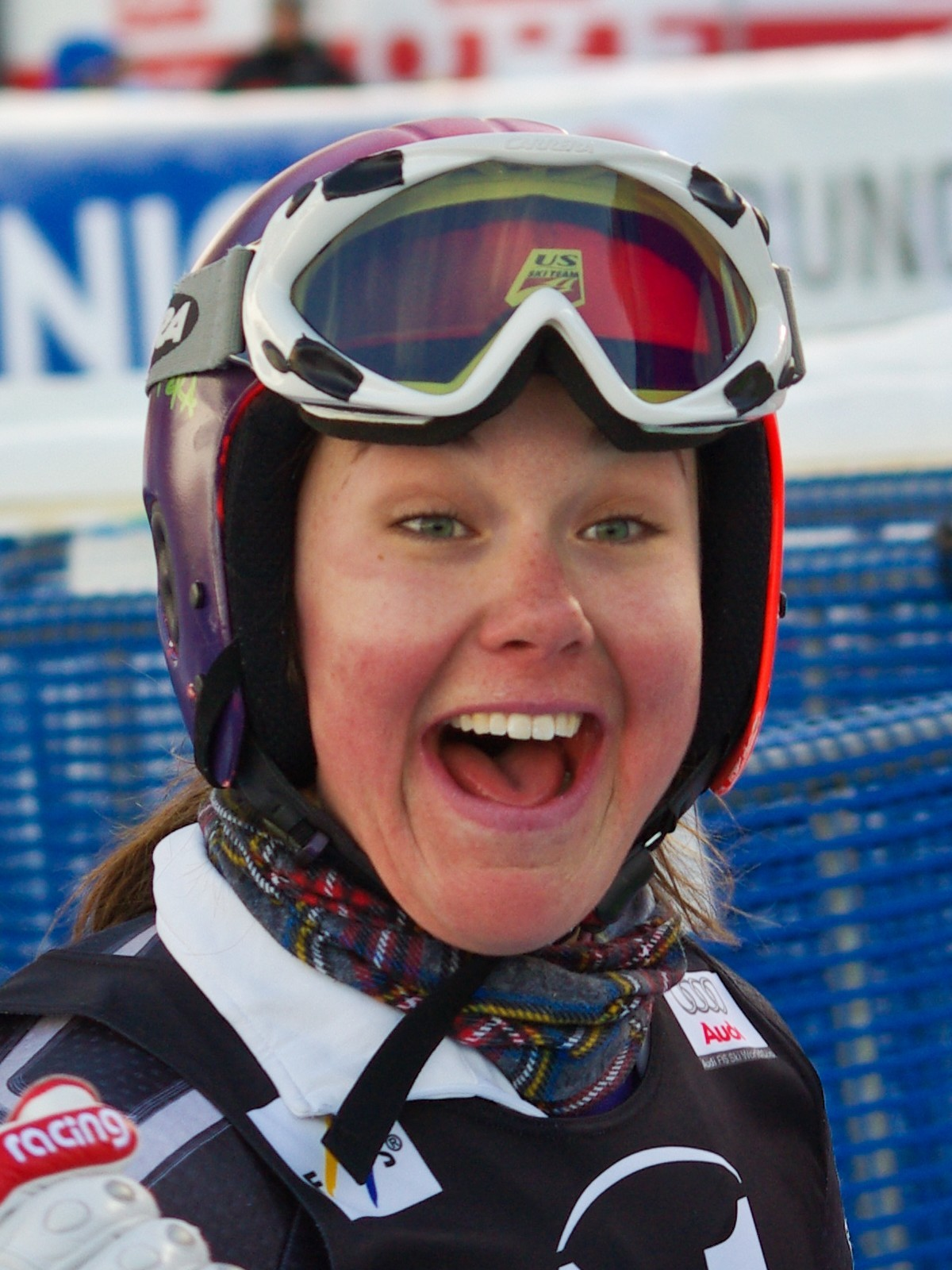
- Smith in January 2009

Personal information
- Born: May 28, 1987 (age 39) North Conway, New Hampshire, U.S.
- Height: 5 ft 5 in (165 cm)

Skiing career
- Sport: Alpine skiing
- Club: Mt. Washington Valley
- Disciplines: Downhill, Super-G, Combined
- World Cup debut: December 1, 2007 (age 20)

Olympics
- Teams: 2 – (2010, 2014)
- Medals: 0

World Championships
- Teams: 2 – (2011, 2013)
- Medals: 0

World Cup
- Seasons: 7th – (2008–14)
- Wins: 0
- Podiums: 2 – (2 DH)
- Overall titles: 0 – (25th in 2013)
- Discipline titles: 0 – (12th in DH & SG, 2013)

Leanne Smith (born May 28, 1987) is an American World Cup alpine ski racer and specializes in the speed events.

== Early life ==
Born in North Conway, New Hampshire, Smith attended A. Crosby Kennett High School. She spent her skiing time on the local mountain, Cranmore, where the founder of the first skiing school in the United States, Hannes Schneider, arrived from Austria. Following Cranmore, she trained with the Mount Washington Valley Ski Team, coached by Kurt Simard. Smith graduated from high school in 2005, and then attended the University of New Hampshire in Durham and raced for the Wildcats in 2006.

== U.S. Ski Team ==
After her freshman year at UNH, Smith joined the U.S. Ski Team for the 2007 season, on the developmental team. She moved up to the World Cup team the following season and made her debut in December 2007 in Canada at Lake Louise and finished 23rd in the downhill.

Smith's best World Cup finish is 2nd in a downhill at Val-d'Isère in December 2012. She represented the U.S. at the Winter Olympics in 2010 and 2014, and at the World Championships in 2011 and 2013.

== World Cup results ==
=== Season standings ===
Season	Age	Overall	Slalom	Giant Slalom	Super G	Downhill	Combined
2008	20	88	—	—	36	45	35
2009	21	94	—	—	43	41	41
2010	22	75	—	—	41	36	31
2011	23	30	—	—	15	22	19
2012	24	38	—	—	16	25	28
2013	25	25	—	—	12	12	37
2014	26	52	—	—	19	30	—

=== Top ten finishes ===
- 2 podiums – (2 DH)

Season	Date	Location	Discipline	Place
2011	21 Jan 2011	Cortina d'Ampezzo, Italy	Super G	8th
2011	4 Mar 2011	Tarvisio, Italy	Super Combined	9th
2012	15 Jan 2012	Cortina d'Ampezzo, Italy	Super G	10th
2012	28 Jan 2012	St. Moritz, Switzerland	Downhill	7th
2012	15 Mar 2012	Schladming, Austria	Super G	5th
2013	2 Dec 2012	Lake Louise, Canada	Super G	8th
2013	14 Dec 2012	Val-d'Isère, France	Downhill	2nd
2013	19 Jan 2013	Cortina d'Ampezzo, Italy	Downhill	3rd
2013	20 Jan 2013	Cortina d'Ampezzo, Italy	Super G	6th
2014	8 Dec 2013	Lake Louise, Canada	Super G	6th

== World Championship results ==
Year	Age	Slalom	Giant Slalom	Super-G	Downhill	Combined
2011	23	—	—	19	DNF	DSQ1
2013	25	—	—	16	12	DNS2

== Olympic results ==
Year	Age	Slalom	Giant Slalom	Super-G	Downhill	Combined
2010	22	—	—	18	—	21
2014	26	—	—	18	—	DNF2
