= Redstone, New Hampshire =

Unincorporated community in New Hampshire, United States

- Unincorporated community
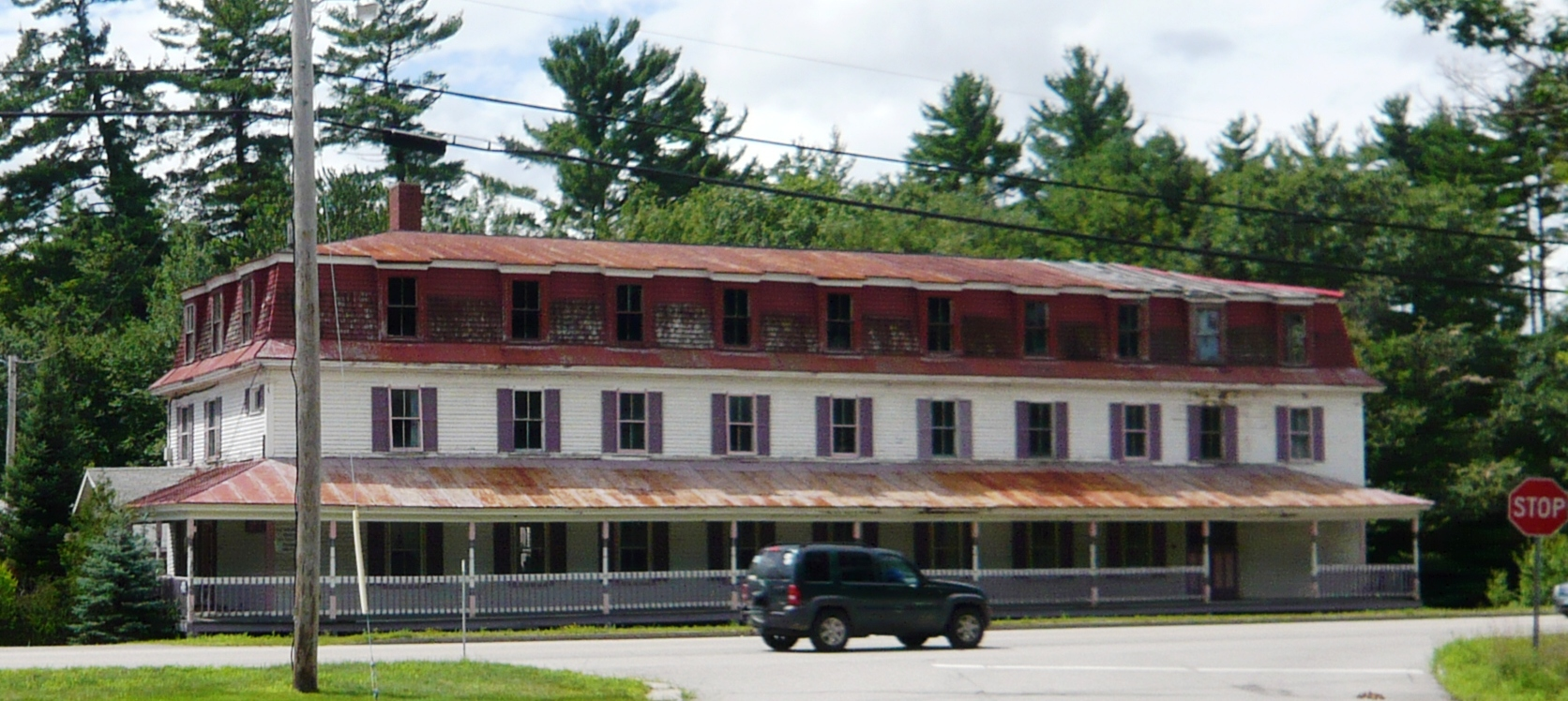
- Old boarding house for quarry workers

- Location within New Hampshire Location within the United States
- Coordinates: 44°0′53″N 71°06′04″W
- Country: United States
- State: New Hampshire
- County: Carroll
- Town: Conway
- Elevation: 486 ft (148 m)
- Time zone: UTC-5 (Eastern (EST))
  - Summer (DST): UTC-4 (EDT)
- ZIP Code: 03813 (Center Conway)
- Area code: 603
- GNIS feature ID: 872558

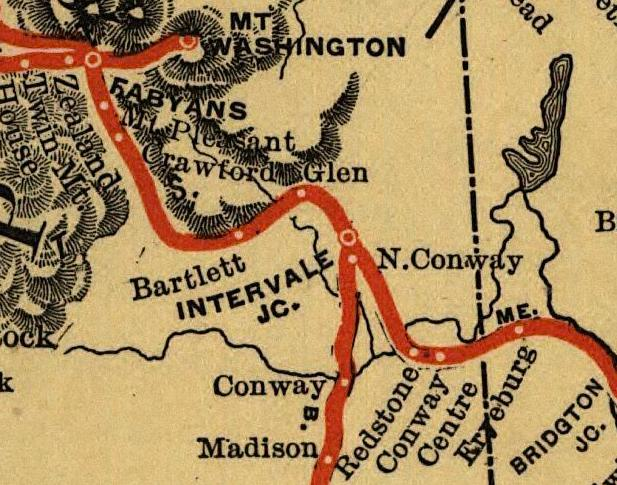
Detail of 1898 Boston & Maine railroad map showing the stop for Redstone, New Hampshire at the quarry location across from the old workers boarding house

Redstone is an unincorporated community within the town of Conway in Carroll County, New Hampshire, United States. It is located on the road from Center Conway to North Conway at the base of Rattlesnake Mountain. From the late 19th century until circa 1950, Redstone was known for its quarry of "red" granite which was mined extensively.

== History ==
The first road through Redstone was made in 1765 and 1766. One of the first products to be taken from the hills nearby were rattlesnakes, whose venom was valued for medicinal properties (thus the name Rattlesnake Mountain). This practice stopped after a fire raged over the hills in the 1870s, killing the rattlesnake population, and exposing the rocky slopes to erosion. This led to exploiting the mountain for one of the most important mineral products of New Hampshire, which has long been known as the "Granite State". The Conway quarries, four in number in 1908, were on either side of the Saco River, south-east and south-west of North Conway; their output is coarse constructional stones, all biotite or biotite-hornblende, but varying in colour, pinkish ("red") and dark-yellow greenish-grey ("green") varieties being found remarkably near each other at Redstone, on the east side of the Saco valley. The finer varieties take a high polish and are used for monuments, and the coarser grades are used for construction, especially of railway bridges, and for paving and curbing.

The Portland and Ogdensburg Railroad built the rail from Center Conway through Redstone to North Conway in 1865, but the Redstone stop along the line was formed after the Maine Central took over. The quarry received orders for stone abutments for three bridges between 1876 and 1880; the North Conway bridge, the Center Conway bridge, and the Mill Brook bridge south of Center Conway. It was during this time that the granite's splitting qualities drew the attention of the Maine Central roadmaster George W. Wagg, and Redstone was adopted by the Maine and New Hampshire Granite Company. A railroad station was erected in 1888, and the village got its own post office the following year. There was also a small nondenominational church built on the Quarry Road. The quarry workers were housed in tenements and a large boarding house called "the Schooner", which itself could house 80 men whose pay was reduced by fixed costs for their room and board. By 1889, 300 men were employed at Redstone, shipping six to nine railroad cars of rough granite daily.

Redstone granite can be found in many old station buildings of the Boston & Maine Railroad. In its heyday, the quarry at Redstone had more than twenty derricks in operation. Huge slabs of red, pink, or green granite were shipped near and far with the Boston & Maine railroad, whose cars went directly into the quarry for loading. You could say the growth of the quarry matched the growth of the railroad line, as each new train station was built with Redstone granite.

New Hampshire granites were used for building as early as 1623. The value of granite quarried in the state increased from a few hundred thousand dollars' worth in 1887 to upwards of a million dollars' worth in 1902, when building stone was valued at $619,916, monumental stone at $346,735 and paving stone at $101,548. In that year New Hampshire ranked fourth among the states in output of granite, with 6.3% of the total value of granite quarried in the entire country; in 1908 the value of granite ($867,028) was exceeded by that of each of seven other states but was more than one half of the total value of all mineral products of the state.

== Hiking ==
The quarry closed in 1942. Today, the granite is protected through The Nature Conservancy, thanks to a 1990 bequest by Anna B. Stearns for the Green Hills Preserve. A hiking trail leads along a ridge with views of the White Mountains and ends at the old quarry site.
