= Kenneth Ward =

American politician

Member of the New Hampshire House of Representatives from the Strafford 2nd district
- In office 2008–2010

Member of the New Hampshire House of Representatives from the Strafford 21st district
- In office 2012–2016

Personal details
- Born: July 19, 1962 (age 64) North Conway, New Hampshire, U.S.
- Party: Republican
- Education: University of New Hampshire

Kenneth Ward (born July 19, 1962) is an American politician. A member of the Republican Party, he served in the New Hampshire House of Representatives from 2008 to 2010 and again from 2012 to 2016.
