= WMWV =

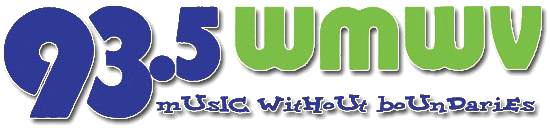
- Conway, New Hampshire; United States
- Broadcast area: Mount Washington Valley
- Frequency: 93.5 MHz

Programming
- Format: Adult album alternative
- Affiliations: AP Radio

Ownership
- Owner: Greg Frizzell; (Mt. Washington Radio & Gramophone, L.L.C.)
- Sister stations: WBNC; WVMJ

History
- First air date: June 23, 1967 (as WBNC-FM)
- Former call signs: WBNC-FM (1967–1979)
- Call sign meaning: Mount Washington Valley

Technical information
- Licensing authority: FCC
- Facility ID: 49200
- Class: A
- ERP: 1,850 watts
- HAAT: 129 meters (423 ft)
- Transmitter coordinates: 43°56′48.2″N 71°8′22.2″W

Links
- Public license information: Public file; LMS
- Website: www.wmwv.com

WMWV (93.5 FM) is a radio station broadcasting an Adult album alternative format. Licensed to Conway, New Hampshire, United States, the station serves the Mount Washington Valley area. The station is owned by Mt. Washington Radio & Gramophone, L.L.C. and features programming from AP Radio. Their studio is located in Settlers Green in North Conway.

== History ==
The station went on the air as WBNC-FM on June 23, 1967. On November 2, 1979, the station changed its call sign to the current WMWV.
