= Conway Lake =

Lake in Carroll County, New Hampshire

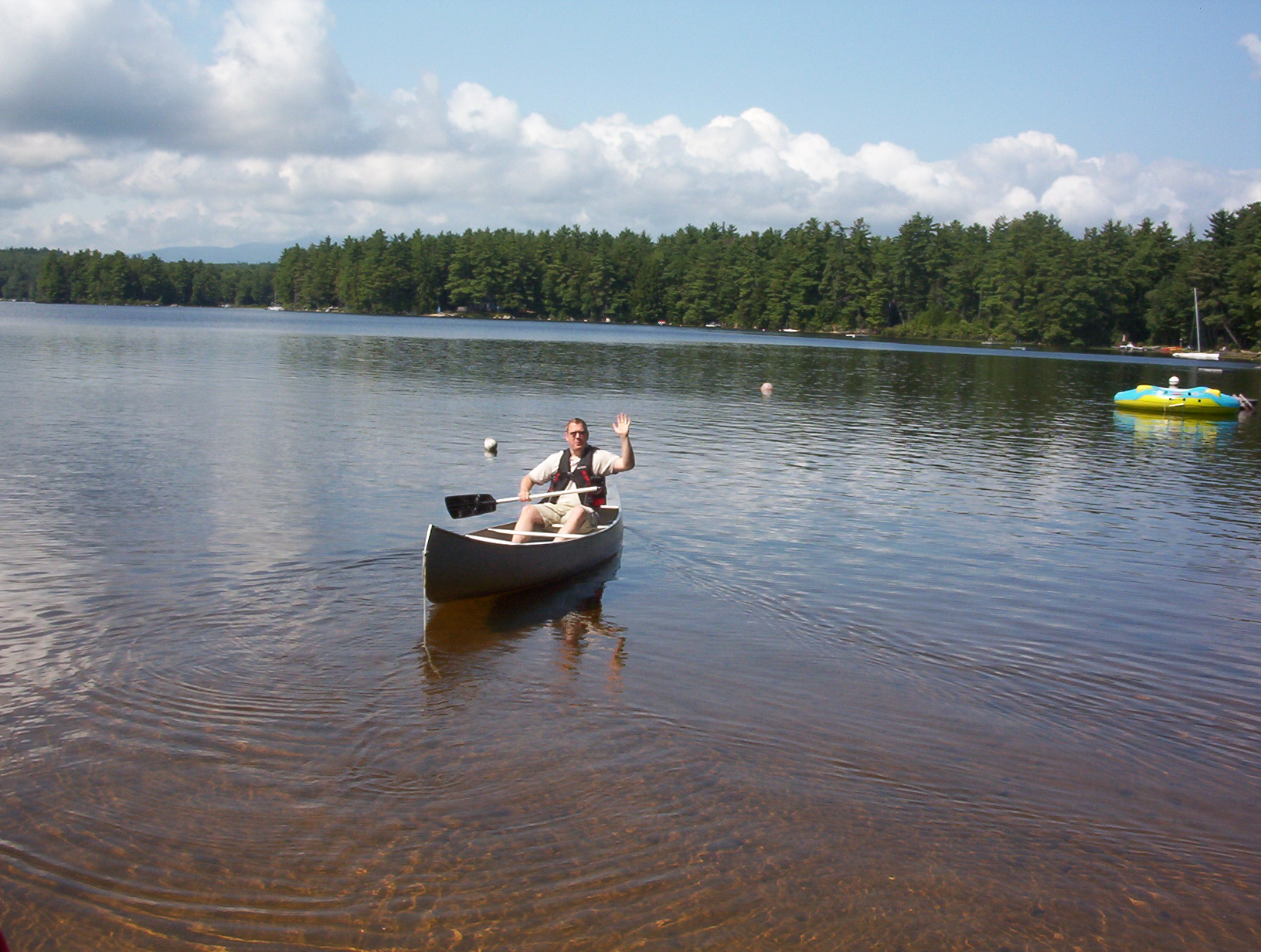
- Conway Lake in summer

- Location within New Hampshire Location within the United States
- Location: Carroll County, New Hampshire
- Coordinates: 43°57′45″N 71°03′28″W
- Lake type: Natural w/ dam
- Primary inflows: Snow Brook
- Primary outflows: Mill Brook
- Basin countries: United States
- Max. length: 4.0 mi (6.4 km)
- Max. width: 1.4 mi (2.3 km)
- Surface area: 1,316 acres (5 km^{2})
- Average depth: 15 ft (4.6 m)
- Max. depth: 45 ft (14 m)
- Shore length^{1}: 19.2 miles (30.9 km)
- Surface elevation: 437 ft (133 m)
- Settlements: Conway; Eaton
- ^{1} Shore length is not a well-defined measure.

Conway Lake is a 1,316-acre (5 km^{2}) water body with a maximum depth of 45 feet (14 m), located in Carroll County in eastern New Hampshire, in the United States. The lake is located in the towns of Conway and Eaton, just to the east of the White Mountains, and is part of the Saco River watershed.

== History ==
Conway Lake was formerly known as Walker's Pond. At the northern edge of the lake on Mill Street there is a park by that name that comprises the Conway Lake Dam and original mill site. In 1773, 100 acres (40 ha) were granted to Captain Timothy Walker by the town of Conway, in order to build a sawmill and gristmill. It was later sold to H. B. Cotton, who began to make boxes and piano backings. Henry Peary was the last owner of the mill, but it burned down and was never rebuilt, hurting the town's economy. In 1817 the Gazetteer of the State of New Hampshire said of Conway: "It contains 4 corn mills, 5 saw mills, 1 mill for dressing cloth, 2 carding machines, 3 distilleries, and 3 retail stores."

It was not until the coming of the train tracks in 1865 that the mills started to prosper. At that time logs were floated over Conway Lake for processing before being hauled off by freight car to Portsmouth and other places. Together with the nearby granite from Redstone, the mills on Mill Street were responsible for producing wood for several train stations in New England.

A public beach was added in 1952, deeded to the town from Public Service Company of New Hampshire. The town raised $100 for improvements to the beach. With the success of the public beach the town soon added a boat launch.

Sokoki Native American relics have been found on the lake. George Chapman found artifacts around 1965. They were found in the Sokoki village on the north shore of the lake.

== Fish species ==
Species in Conway Lake include the following warm-water freshwater fish: chain pickerel, hornpout (same as BBH – brown bullhead), landlocked salmon, largemouth bass, rainbow trout, and smallmouth bass. The New Hampshire Fish and Game Department manages the lake for landlocked salmon; fishing licenses are required, and the lake waters are patrolled regularly.

== Uses ==
Through the years, Conway Lake has been a source for recreation. There is one public beach located off Mill Street in Conway. The lake is utilized for swimming, boating, canoeing, and fishing.

== Wildlife ==
The lake is home to herons, loons, eagles, deer, snakes, stinkpot turtles, painted turtles and snapping turtles.

== See also ==
- List of lakes in New Hampshire
