= Conway (CDP), New Hampshire =

Census-designated place in New Hampshire, United States

Conway, New Hampshire
- Census-designated place
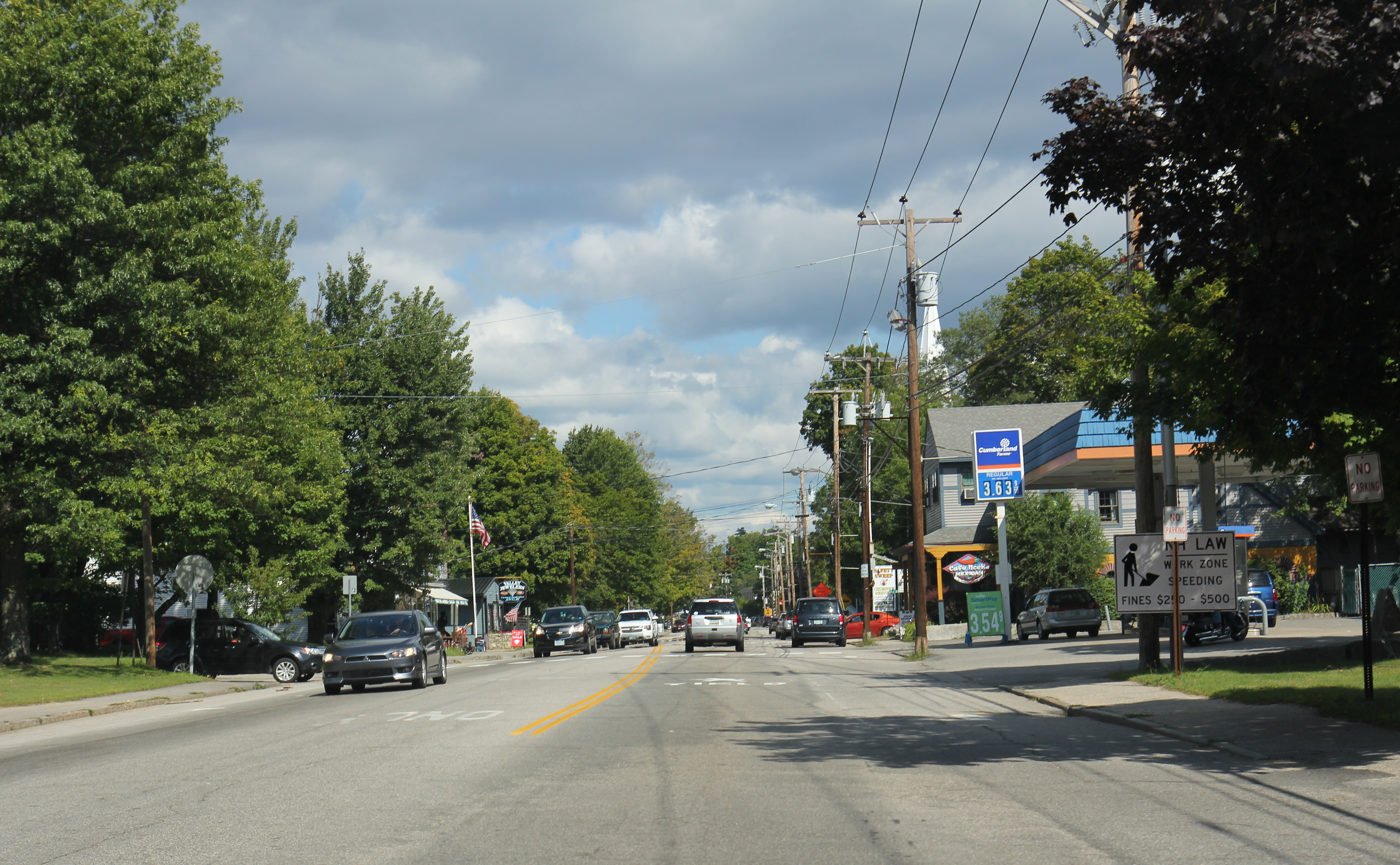
- Conway on NH 16

- Location within New Hampshire Location within the United States
- Coordinates: 43°58′45″N 71°07′13″W
- Country: United States
- State: New Hampshire
- County: Carroll
- Town: Conway

Area
  - Total: 7.42 sq mi (19.22 km^{2})
  - Land: 7.05 sq mi (18.25 km^{2})
  - Water: 0.37 sq mi (0.97 km^{2})
- Elevation: 456 ft (139 m)

Population (2020)
  - Total: 3,576
  - Density: 507.5/sq mi (195.94/km^{2})
- Time zone: UTC-5 (Eastern (EST))
  - Summer (DST): UTC-4 (EDT)
- ZIP Codes: 03818 (Conway); 03813 (Center Conway); 03860 (North Conway)
- Area code: 603
- FIPS code: 33-14580
- GNIS feature ID: 2378057

Conway is a census-designated place (CDP) and the primary village in the town of Conway, New Hampshire, United States. The population was 3,576 at the 2020 census. It is the most populous community in the town of Conway, ahead of North Conway.

== Geography ==
According to the United States Census Bureau, the Conway CDP has a total area of 7.4 square miles (19.2 km^{2}), of which 7.1 square miles (18.3 km^{2}) are land and 0.39 square miles (1.0 km^{2}), or 5.06%, are water.

The village lies in the southwestern part of the town of Conway, situated at the juncture of the Saco River, the Swift River, and Pequawket Brook. The CDP is bordered to the west by the town of Albany, to the south by the town of Madison, and to the north by North Conway. New Hampshire Route 16, Route 113, and Route 153 converge at the village center. Route 112, the Kancamagus Highway, has its eastern terminus in the western part of the village.

== Demographics ==
Historical population
Census	Pop.	Note	%±
1950	1,238		—
1960	1,143		−7.7%
1970	1,489		30.3%
1980	1,781		19.6%
1990	1,604		−9.9%
2000	1,692		5.5%
2010	1,823		7.7%
2020	3,576		96.2%
U.S. Decennial Census

As of the census of 2010, there were 1,823 people, 853 households, and 441 families residing in the CDP. The population density was 628.6 inhabitants per square mile (242.7/km^{2}). There were 1,062 housing units, of which 209, or 19.7%, were vacant. 147 of the vacant units were seasonal or vacation properties. The racial makeup of the town was 97.4% White, 0.1% African American, 0.7% Native American, 0.4% Asian, 0.2% some other race, and 1.2% from two or more races. 0.4% of the population were Hispanic or Latino of any race.

There were 853 households, out of which 25.4% had children under the age of 18 living with them, 34.3% were headed by married couples living together, 12.4% had a female householder with no husband present, and 48.3% were non-families. 38.6% of all households were made up of individuals, and 13.6% were someone living alone who was 65 years of age or older. The average household size was 2.14, and the average family size was 2.85.

In the CDP, the population was spread out, with 20.6% under the age of 18, 8.1% from 18 to 24, 25.8% from 25 to 44, 30.2% from 45 to 64, and 15.4% who were 65 years of age or older. The median age was 42.6 years. For every 100 females, there were 93.1 males. For every 100 females age 18 and over, there were 88.8 males.

For the period 2007–11, the estimated median annual income for a household was $34,250, and the median income for a family was $60,135. Male full-time workers had a median income of $42,303 versus $26,635 for females. The per capita income for the CDP was $24,752. 18.6% of the population and 7.9% of families were below the poverty line.
