= Ed Ashnault =

American basketball coach (1934–2021)

Personal information
- Born: December 29, 1934
- Died: May 6, 2021 (aged 86)

Career information
- High school: Kennett (North Conway, New Hampshire)
- College: Plymouth State

Career history

Coaching
- 1960–1964: Wilton HS
- 1964–1967: Dickinson
- 1967–1972: Colgate
- 1972–1974: William & Mary

Career highlights
- Plymouth State University Hall of Fame (2002)

Edward Joseph Ashnault (December 29, 1934 – May 6, 2021) was an American basketball coach for the Dickinson College Red Raiders (1964–67), Colgate Raiders (1967–72), and William & Mary Tribe (1972–74) He finished his two-year stint at W&M with a 10-12 Southern Conference record (19–35 overall).

Ashnault died on May 6, 2021, at the age of 86.
