= WVMJ =

- Conway, New Hampshire; United States
- Broadcast area: North Conway, New Hampshire
- Frequency: 104.5 MHz
- Branding: Magic 104

Programming
- Format: Top 40 (CHR)

Ownership
- Owner: Mt. Washington Radio & Gramophone, L.L.C.
- Sister stations: WBNC; WMWV

History
- Former call signs: WMLY (1989–1995); WBNC-FM (1995–2001)

Technical information
- Licensing authority: FCC
- Facility ID: 49204
- Class: A
- ERP: 1,850 watts
- HAAT: 130.8 meters (429 ft)
- Transmitter coordinates: 43°56′48.2″N 71°8′22.2″W
- Translator: 98.1 W251BD (Berlin)

Links
- Public license information: Public file; LMS
- Webcast: Listen live
- Website: www.conwaymagic.com

WVMJ (104.5 MHz) is a commercial FM radio station broadcasting a CHR format, known as "Magic 104". Licensed to Conway, New Hampshire, the station serves the Mount Washington Valley of Northeast New Hampshire and the Sebago Lake Region of Maine. On weekends, it carries American Top 40 hosted by Ryan Seacrest, and syndicated by Premiere Networks.

The station is owned by Mt. Washington Radio & Gramophone, L.L.C. Programming is simulcast on FM translator station W251BD on 98.1 MHz in Berlin, New Hampshire.

== History ==
Before the station was built, its construction permit was assigned the call sign WMLY on June 28, 1989. It took several years to sign-on but finally began broadcasting on October 23, 1995. It took the callsign WBNC-FM. As WBNC-FM, it aired a country music format simulcast with co-owned WBNC (1050 AM). On December 17, 2001, it changed callsigns to WVMJ. WVMJ changed formats to contemporary hit radio and its moniker to Magic 104 on December 26, 2001.

== Translator ==
Broadcast translator for WVMJ
Call sign	Frequency	City of license	FID	ERP (W)	HAAT	Class	Transmitter coordinates	FCC info
W251BD	98.1 FM	Berlin, New Hampshire	141693	10	183.7 m (603 ft)	D	44°30′19″N 71°10′56″W	LMS
