= Pequawket Lake =

Lake in York County, Maine

- Horn Pond, Horne Pond, Pequaket Lake
- Satellite view of Pequawket Lake (Horne Pond), courtesy of the USGS
- Location: Limington, Maine
- Type: Glacial lake
- Etymology: Native American tribe
- Primary inflows: Horne Pond Brook, Stone Brook, Hanscomb Brook
- Basin countries: United States
- Managing agency: Pequawket Lake Preservation Association
- Built: 1915
- Surface area: 166 acres (67 ha)
- Average depth: 22 ft (6.7 m)
- Max. depth: 58 ft (18 m)
- Shore length^{1}: 3.9 miles (6.3 km)
- Surface elevation: 280 ft (85 m)
- Islands: 0
- Settlements: Limington
- ^{1} Shore length is not a well-defined measure.

Pequawket Lake, also known as Horne Pond, is a 166-acre (67 ha) freshwater lake in the town of Limington, York County, Maine. It is fed by Horne Pond Brook, and is located near Websters Mill Pond (also known as Blakes Mill Pond) and Ward Pond to the south, and Dollar Pond, a small, circular marsh, to the northeast.

== History ==
Pequawket Lake formed as a glacial lake nearly 15,000 years ago due to deep glacial erosion. Pequawket Lake was initially called "Horn Pond", because two of its coves made the lake look like it had bull's horns. Around the 17th century, when Europeans were first exploring the Limington area, they came across this lake and gave it that name. In 1917, the nae was changed to Pequaket Lake, however, the official name remained Horne Pond (this time with an "e"), because the "Pequaket Lake" name change was not a government move. The name eventually gained a "W", and is today referred to as both Horne Pond and Pequawket Lake. Today, the official name is undecided, though the Pequawket Lake Preserve mainly refers to it as Pequawket Lake.

== Geography ==
Pequawket Lake is located 280 feet above sea level, and is located next to three other ponds; Ward Pond and Websters Mill Pond to the south, and a small, circular marsh called Dollar Pond to the northeast. It is part of the Saco River watershed. Horne Pond Brook flows south from the lake into Hamlin Brook, which continues southward until it meets the Little Ossipee River, which flows east into the Saco River, which eventually meets the Gulf of Maine. Stone Brook and Hanscomb Brook are also inflows of Pequawket Lake.

== Hydrology ==
Pequawket Lake is a large, 166-acre lake with an average depth of 22 feet, and a maximum depth of 58 feet. It has a 3.9 mile perimeter, and is a coldwater fishery. It is part of the Saco River watershed, with its primary inflow, Horne Pond Brook, meeting Hamlin Brook, a Little Ossipee River tributary. The Little Ossipee River itself is a tributary of the Saco River.

== Ecology ==
Classified as a coldwater fishery, Pequawket Lake is stocked with fish species such as brook trout, brown trout, rainbow smelt, smallmouth bass, white perch, yellow perch, chain pickerel, golden shiner, fallfish, white sucker, hornpout, banded killifish, pumpkinseed sunfish, redbreast sunfish, and American eel. There are no known harmful or invasive species in the lake. The average surface temperature at Pequawket Lake is 74°F, while 35 feet deep is 41°F.

The lakeshore of Pequawket Lake is mainly composed of hardwood and softwood frests, marshes, bogs, and of course, beaches. White pines, oaks, maples, hemlocks, alders, and beeches are some of the lakeshore's flora. Chokeberry, shadbush, winterberry, and sweet fern make up a dense shrub habitat along the shore, which prevents erosion. The Northern Pitcher Plant can be found in the area's more acidic areas.

At least one pair of mating loons returns to Pequawket Lake every year, after spending their winter in the warm, usually ocean water. Ducks, eagles, frogs, turtles, white-tailed deer, snakes, bats, opussums, racoons, porcupines, sometimes even moose, and bears, can be seen in Pequawket Lake and its surrounding areas.

== Spillway ==
At Pequawket Lake's southern shore, a 150-foot concrete and timber-crib spillway was built to help regulate the lake's water levels after storms and snowmelt. Built in 1915 as a dam, the spillway sends water further into Horne Pond Brook, which is carried to Websters Mill Pond. In 1965, Central Maine Power purchased the spillway for a grand total of $1. Later, the Pequawket Lake Improvement Association set forth plans to continue maitenance. As the years passed, maintaining the dam proved to be expensive, and in the 1990s, the Maine DEP suggested hat the steel plate and guides of the dam be fully removed. This action would allow the water level to naturally rise and fall, changing it from a dam to a spillway. To this day, the water level changes naturally, and the spillway's design allows fish to pass in and out of the lake for feeding, breeding, and migration.

== See also ==
- Little Ossipee River
- Saco River
- List of lakes of Maine
