= Center Conway, New Hampshire =

Unincorporated community in New Hampshire, United States

- Unincorporated community
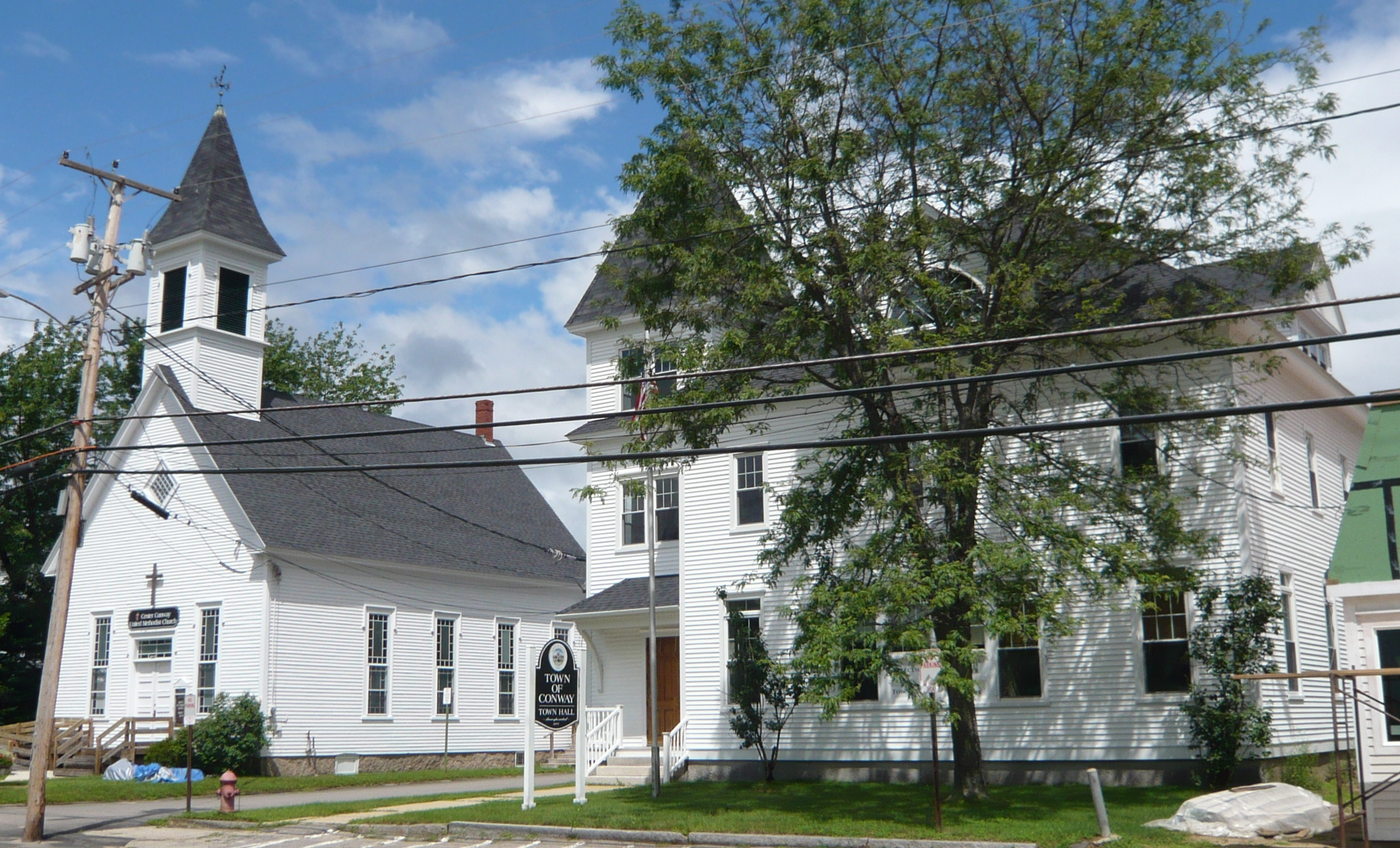
- Main street of Center Conway, New Hampshire. On the right is the old Town House, and on the left is the United Methodist Church.

- Location within New Hampshire Location within the United States
- Coordinates: 43°59′44″N 71°03′40″W
- Country: United States
- State: New Hampshire
- County: Carroll
- Town: Conway
- Elevation: 459 ft (140 m)
- Time zone: UTC-5 (Eastern (EST))
  - Summer (DST): UTC-4 (EDT)
- ZIP code: 03813
- Area code: 603
- GNIS feature ID: 871651

Center Conway is an unincorporated community within the town of Conway in Carroll County, New Hampshire, United States. From the late 19th century until the Second World War, Center Conway was known for its corn cannery. Today the homes are mostly residential, with many vacationers visiting the scenic Conway Lake. The old corn farms have given way to modern businesses, though summer corn is still harvested from local corn fields.

== History ==
Center Conway is the oldest settlement of Conway, New Hampshire. The first annual town meeting of Conway was held there on February 20, 1770, by Thomas Merrill and Joshua Heath. Until the town house was built in 1837, the town meetings were held in homes or taverns.

== Seasonal vacationers ==
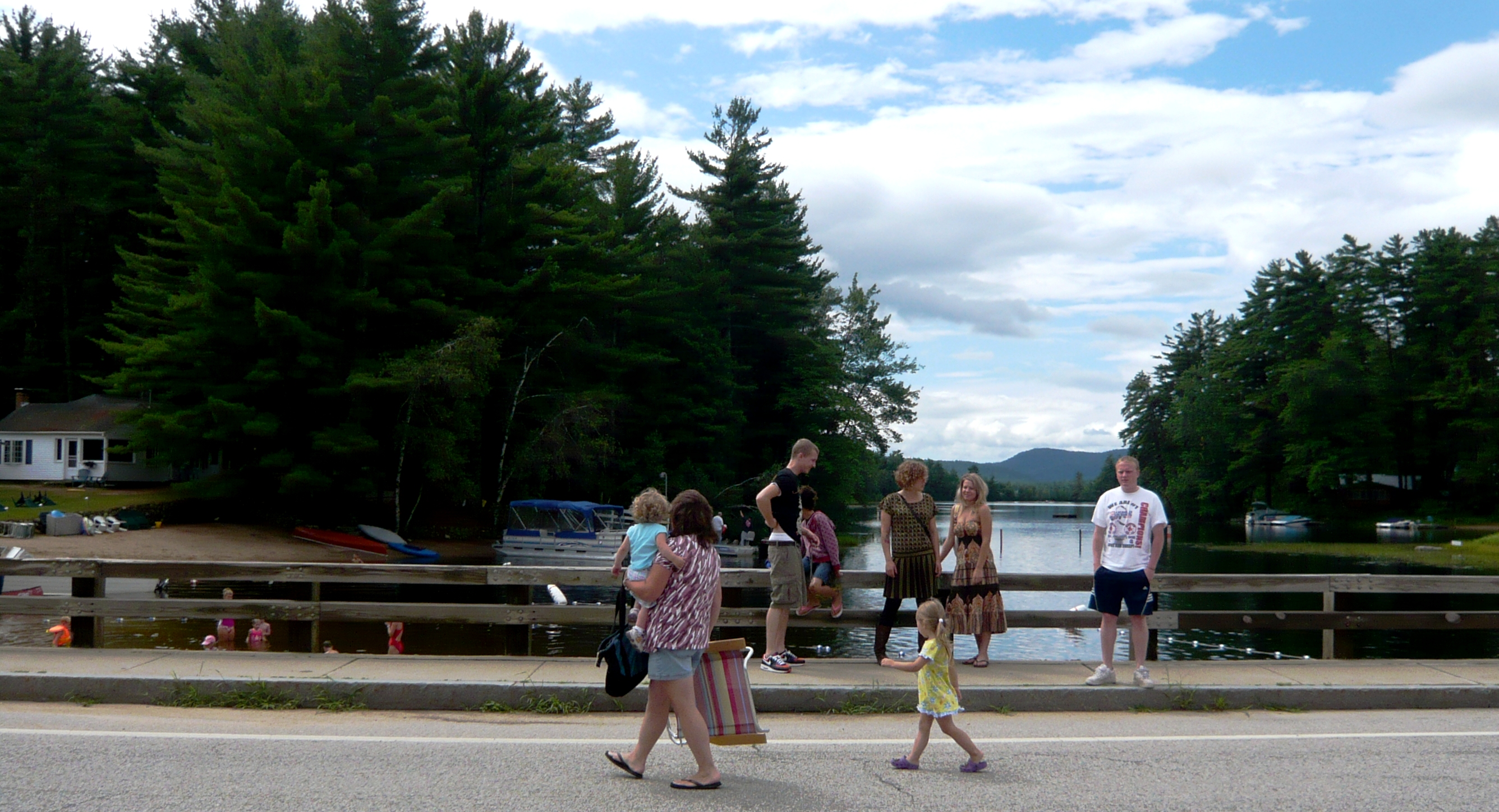
Town beach on Conway Lake in Center Conway

Though the village has grown during the last century, most of its inhabitants are holiday visitors, who take advantage of the scenic setting surrounding Conway Lake and the White Mountains. Formerly, visitors came only in the summer, but more and more families are winterizing their summer homes for skiing on nearby Mt. Cranmore.
