= Eaton, New Hampshire =

- Town
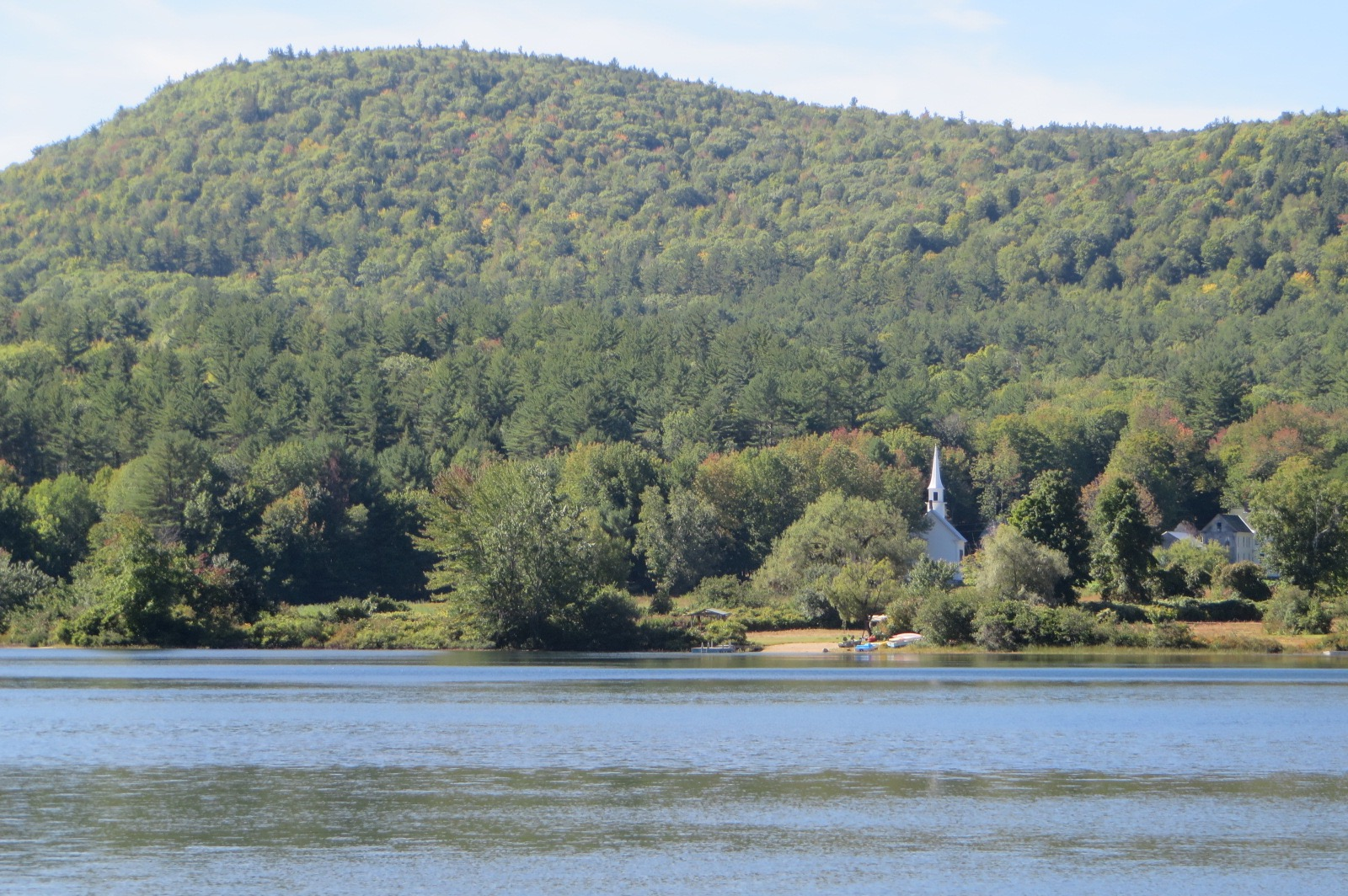
- The "Little White Church" in Eaton Center overlooking Crystal Lake

- Seal

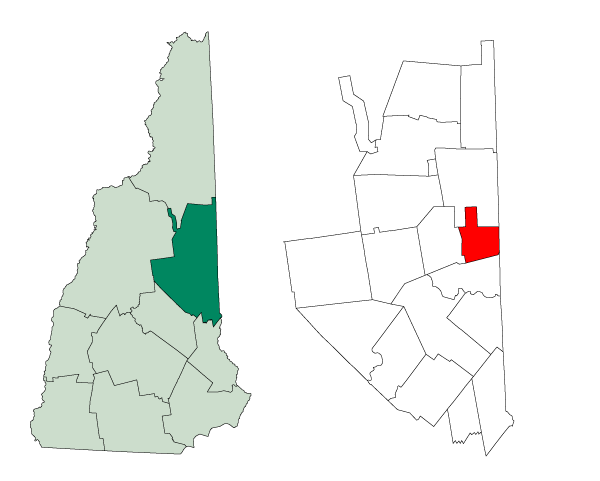
- Location in Carroll County, New Hampshire
- Coordinates: 43°53′34″N 71°02′36″W
- Country: United States
- State: New Hampshire
- County: Carroll
- Incorporated: 1766
- Villages: Eaton Center; Snowville

Area
  - Total: 25.6 sq mi (66.3 km^{2})
  - Land: 24.3 sq mi (62.9 km^{2})
  - Water: 1.3 sq mi (3.4 km^{2}) 5.07%
- Elevation: 1,099 ft (335 m)

Population (2020)
  - Total: 405
  - Density: 17/sq mi (6.4/km^{2})
- Time zone: UTC-5 (Eastern)
  - Summer (DST): UTC-4 (Eastern)
- ZIP code: 03832
- Area code: 603
- FIPS code: 33-23380
- GNIS feature ID: 873587
- Website: www.eatonnh.gov

Eaton is a town in Carroll County, New Hampshire, United States. The population was 405 at the 2020 census, and an estimated 429 in 2025. Eaton includes the villages of Eaton Center and Snowville.

== History ==
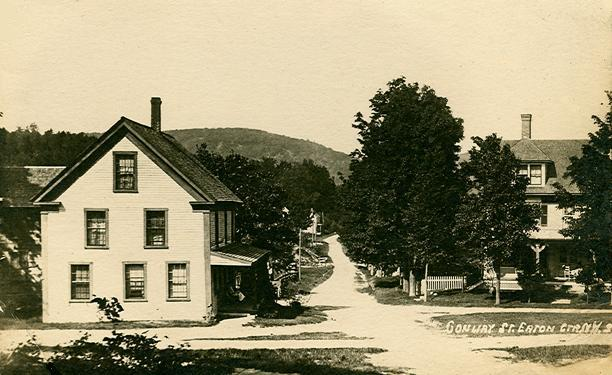
Conway Street in Eaton c. 1910

Eaton was incorporated in 1766 by colonial Governor Benning Wentworth, and named for Governor Theophilus Eaton of Connecticut, a generous contributor to the funds needed to settle Massachusetts in 1630. He later formed a colony at New Haven, Connecticut, along with Reverend John Davenport and David Yale, great-grandfather of Yale University's founder, Elihu Yale.

The "Little White Church" is a town landmark. The village of Snowville is named for the Snow family, who started a sawmill there in 1825. Waukeela, a summer camp for girls, has been in Eaton for 104 years as of 2026. It occupies 45 acres (180,000 m^{2}) on Crystal Lake.

== Geography ==
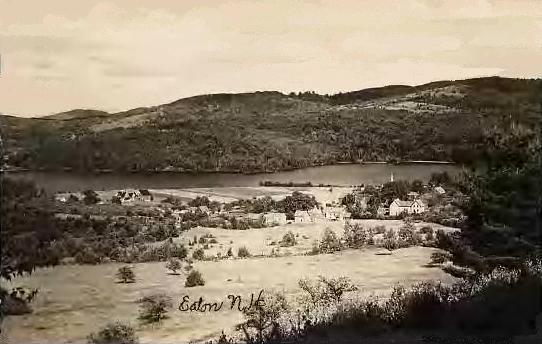
Eaton in 1909

According to the United States Census Bureau, the town has a total area of 25.6 square miles (66.3 km^{2}), of which 24.3 square miles (62.9 km^{2}) are land and 1.3 square miles (3.4 km^{2}) are water, comprising 5.07% of the town. Conway Lake is on the northern boundary, and Crystal Lake is in the center. Eaton lies fully within the Saco River watershed. The highest point in town is 1,730 feet (530 m) above sea level on its southern boundary, just north of the 1,806-foot (550 m) summit of Cragged Mountain. Eaton is bounded on the east by the Maine state line.

== Demographics ==
Historical population
Census	Pop.	Note	%±
1790	254		—
1800	381		50.0%
1810	535		40.4%
1820	1,071		100.2%
1830	1,432		33.7%
1840	1,710		19.4%
1850	1,743		1.9%
1860	780		−55.2%
1870	657		−15.8%
1880	629		−4.3%
1890	514		−18.3%
1900	365		−29.0%
1910	380		4.1%
1920	237		−37.6%
1930	210		−11.4%
1940	196		−6.7%
1950	221		12.8%
1960	151		−31.7%
1970	221		46.4%
1980	256		15.8%
1990	362		41.4%
2000	375		3.6%
2010	393		4.8%
2020	405		3.1%
2024 (est.)	428		5.7%
U.S. Decennial Census

As of the census of 2000, there were 375 people, 157 households, and 111 families residing in the town. The population density was 15.4 inhabitants per square mile (5.9/km^{2}). There were 239 housing units at an average density of 9.8 per square mile (3.8/km^{2}). The racial makeup of the town was 98.67% White, 0.27% African American, 0.27% Asian, and 0.80% from two or more races.

There were 157 households, out of which 29.9% had children under the age of 18 living with them, 61.1% were married couples living together, 7.6% had a female householder with no husband present, and 28.7% were non-families. 23.6% of all households were made up of individuals, and 7.0% had someone living alone who was 65 years of age or older. The average household size was 2.38 and the average family size was 2.85.

In the town, the population was spread out, with 23.5% under the age of 18, 4.0% from 18 to 24, 21.6% from 25 to 44, 38.9% from 45 to 64, and 12.0% who were 65 years of age or older. The median age was 45 years. For every 100 females, there were 96.3 males. For every 100 females age 18 and over, there were 92.6 males.

The median income for a household in the town was $46,429, and the median income for a family was $53,750. Males had a median income of $31,458 versus $23,750 for females. The per capita income for the town was $21,122. About 3.6% of families and 7.2% of the population were below the poverty line, including 7.6% of those under age 18 and 15.9% of those age 65 or over.

=== Adjacent municipalities ===
- Conway (north)
- Brownfield, Maine (east)
- Porter, Maine (southeast)
- Freedom (south)
- Madison (west)
