= Pequawket Brook =

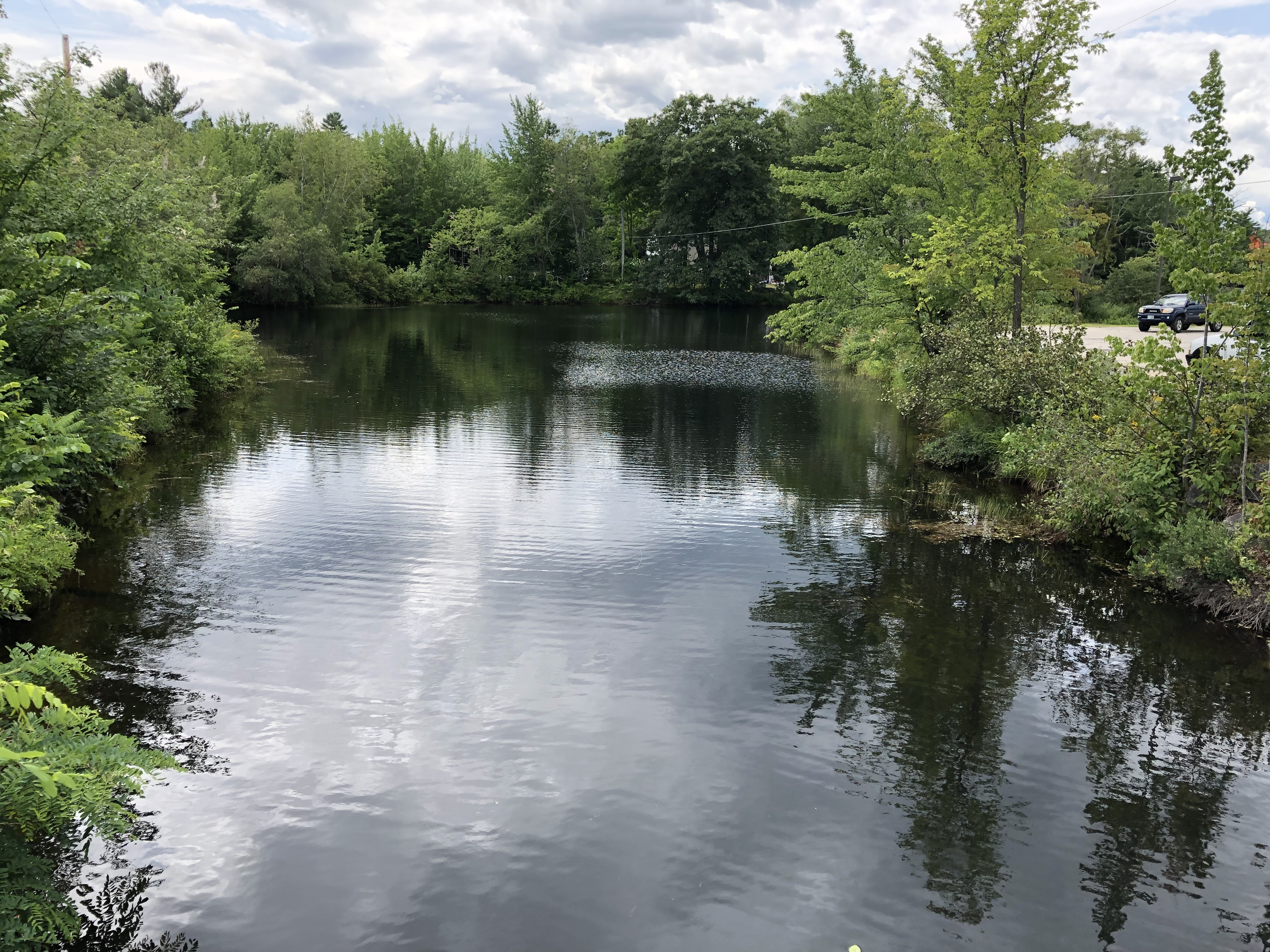
- Pequawket Brook near its outlet from Pequawket Pond in Conway, NH

- Location within New Hampshire Location within the United States

Location
- Country: United States
- State: New Hampshire
- County: Carroll
- Towns: Madison, Albany, Conway

Physical characteristics
- Source
  - location: Madison
  - coordinates: 43°54′36″N 71°10′0″W
  - elevation: 510 ft (160 m)
- Mouth: Swift River
  - location: Conway
  - coordinates: 43°59′3″N 71°7′28″W
  - elevation: 445 ft (136 m)
- Length: 6.4 mi (10.3 km)

Basin features
- Tributaries
  - left: Cream Brook
  - right: Banfield Brook, Page Randall Brook

Pequawket Brook is a 6.4-mile-long (10.3 km) stream near the White Mountains of New Hampshire in the United States. It lies within the watershed of the Saco River, which flows to the Atlantic Ocean in Maine. The brook is under the jurisdiction of the New Hampshire Comprehensive Shoreland Protection Act.

Pequawket Brook rises in the town of Madison, New Hampshire, near a low height of land north of Silver Lake. The brook flows north past extensive sand and gravel excavations to Conway, where it enters Pequawket Pond, a natural pond that has been enlarged by an impoundment in the center of Conway village. Below the pond dam, the brook flows north for one-half mile to the Swift River, just one-half mile above the confluence with the Saco River.

New Hampshire Route 113 follows the brook in northern Madison. NH-16 follows the brook from NH-113 to Conway village.

The Conway Branch rail line follows the brook and ponds.

== See also ==
- List of rivers of New Hampshire
