= Conway, New Hampshire =

- Town
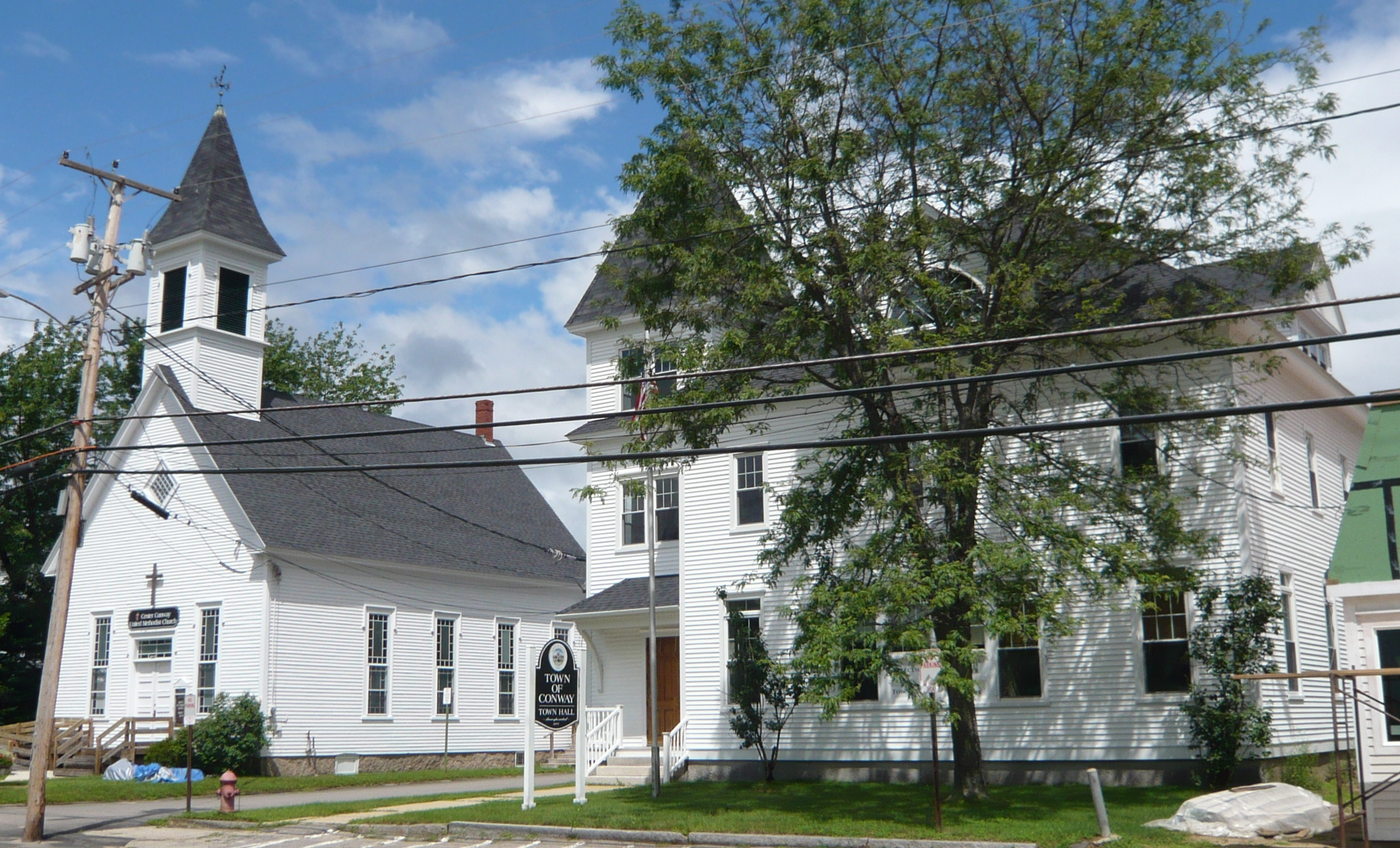
- Town Hall (right) in Center Conway

- Seal

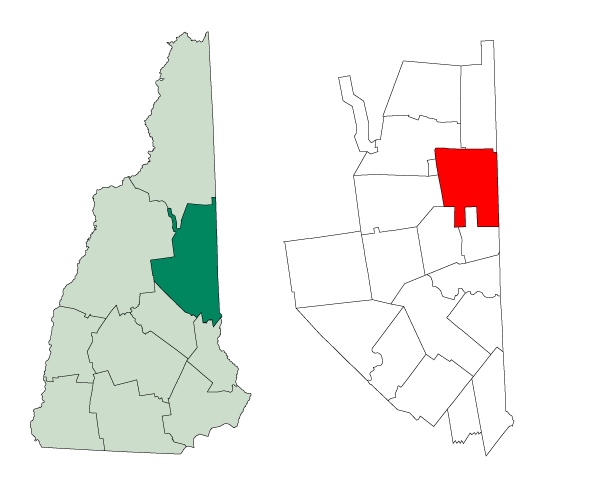
- Location in Carroll County, New Hampshire
- Coordinates: 44°00′31″N 71°04′18″W
- Country: United States
- State: New Hampshire
- County: Carroll
- Incorporated: 1765
- Villages: Conway; Center Conway; East Conway; Intervale; Kearsarge; North Conway; Redstone

Government
  - Type: New England town

Area
  - Total: 71.7 sq mi (185.8 km^{2})
  - Land: 69.5 sq mi (180.0 km^{2})
  - Water: 2.2 sq mi (5.8 km^{2}) 3.14%
- Elevation: 466 ft (142 m)

Population (2020)
  - Total: 9,822
  - Density: 141/sq mi (54.6/km^{2})
- Time zone: UTC-5 (Eastern)
  - Summer (DST): UTC-4 (Eastern)
- ZIP codes: 03813 (Center Conway); 03818 (Conway); 03847 (Kearsarge); 03860 (North Conway)
- Area code: 603
- FIPS code: 33-14660
- GNIS feature ID: 873570
- Website: conwaynh.gov

Conway is a town in Carroll County, New Hampshire, United States. It is the most populous community in the county, with a population of 9,822 at the 2020 census, down from 10,115 at the 2010 census, with another increase up to an estimate of 10,308 in 2025. The town is on the southeastern edge of the White Mountain National Forest. There are five villages in the town: Conway, North Conway, Center Conway, Redstone and Kearsarge. Additionally, it shares a portion of the village of Intervale with the neighboring town of Bartlett.

Conway serves as the main economic and commercial hub for Carroll County. Tourism remains Conway's biggest economic engine, with numerous lodging and rental properties serving visitors to the eastern White Mountains and the Mount Washington Valley, while the technology sector makes up the second largest source of employment. Sites of interest in the town include natural sites such as Cathedral Ledge (popular with climbers), Echo Lake and Conway Lake, as well as several nearby ski resorts. The Conway Scenic Railroad provides day trips to various locations. The village of North Conway features a popular outlet shopping district.

== History ==
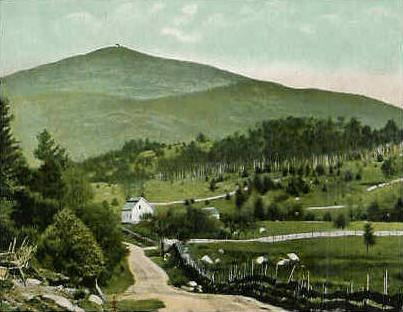
Mount Kearsarge in 1910

The region was once home to the Pequawket Indians, an Algonquian Abenaki tribe. Along the Saco River they fished, hunted or farmed, and lived in wigwams sheltered within stockades. In 1642, explorer Darby Field of Exeter paddled up the Saco in a canoe, and reported seeing "Pigwacket," an Indian community stretching from present-day Conway to Fryeburg, Maine. The Pequawket tribe dwindled from disease, probably smallpox brought from abroad. In May 1725, during Dummer's War, 36 men from Dunstable, Massachusetts led by John Lovewell skirmished with the Pequawket. The Pequawket losses are not known but the result of the day's battle was the withdrawal of the tribe from the area.

In 1765, colonial Governor Benning Wentworth chartered sixty-five men to establish "Conway", named for Henry Seymour Conway, who was later named Commander in Chief of the British Army. To keep his land, a settler had to plant 5 acres (20,000 m^{2}) for every fifty in his share, and to do it within five years. The first roads were built in 1766. Construction of the first meetinghouse began at Redstone. Never completed, it could only be used in summer, with services held whenever a minister visited. Eventually, the partly finished meetinghouse was moved to Center Conway. In 1775, the town raised small sums to build two schoolhouses, one in North Conway. By 1849, however, the town had twenty school districts.

By the middle-19th century, artists had discovered the romantic beauties of the White Mountains, and "Artist Falls Brook" became a favorite setting for landscape paintings. King Edward VII of the United Kingdom bought twelve White Mountain paintings to hang in Windsor Castle. Among the artists to work here were Asher B. Durand and Benjamin Champney, the latter known to paint Mount Washington while sitting in the middle of Main Street.

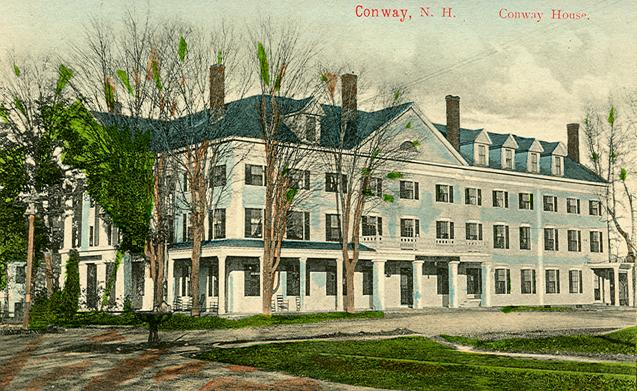
Conway House c. 1910

The Portsmouth, Great Falls and Conway Railroad entered Conway in 1871. The railroad was bought by the Boston & Maine, and joined in town by rival Maine Central. They transported freight, mostly wood and wood products, away from Conway, and they brought tourists. Numerous inns and taverns were built in the 19th and 20th centuries, and tourism remains today a principal business. The first ski trail began operating in 1936 at Mount Cranmore, where Hannes Schneider of Austria provided instruction starting in 1939. In 1959, the Kancamagus Highway opened, connecting Conway with Lincoln. It travels through Kancamagus Pass, named for a Pennacook chief, and at 2,850 feet (870 m) above sea level is the highest paved through-road in New Hampshire.

Since the 1930s, the population of the nearby city of Berlin has decreased significantly, from 20,018 in 1930 to 10,051 in 2010. This decline, coupled with the population increase in Conway and the surrounding community, has led to higher levels of economic development in the Conway area than the rest of northern New Hampshire. Conway has both a tourism-based economy and service economy. As of 2002, the largest employer in the town was Memorial Hospital, employing 350 people, followed by the Conway School District, Hannaford Bros. Co., Red Jacket Resorts, and Walmart.

== Geography ==
According to the United States Census Bureau, the town has a total area of 71.7 square miles (185.8 km^{2}), of which 69.5 square miles (180.0 km^{2}) are land and 2.2 square miles (5.8 km^{2}) are water, comprising 3.14% of the town. Conway is drained by the Saco River and its tributary, the Swift River. The highest point in the town is Black Cap at 2,369 feet (722 m) above sea level.

=== Adjacent municipalities ===
- Chatham (north)
- Fryeburg, Maine (east)
- Brownfield, Maine (southeast)
- Eaton (south)
- Madison (southwest)
- Albany (west)
- Hale's Location (west)
- Bartlett (northwest)

=== Villages ===
Conway is divided into a number of separate villages. The largest is Conway village, in the southwestern part of town, while North Conway is known as a destination for outlet shopping.

The villages of Conway include:

- Conway Village
- North Conway
- Center Conway
- Redstone
- Kearsarge
- Intervale
- East Conway
- South Conway
- Quint

== Demographics ==
Historical population
Census	Pop.	Note	%±
1790	574		—
1800	705		22.8%
1810	1,080		53.2%
1820	1,365		26.4%
1830	1,601		17.3%
1840	1,811		13.1%
1850	1,767		−2.4%
1860	1,624		−8.1%
1870	1,607		−1.0%
1880	2,094		30.3%
1890	2,331		11.3%
1900	3,154		35.3%
1910	3,413		8.2%
1920	3,102		−9.1%
1930	3,217		3.7%
1940	3,651		13.5%
1950	4,109		12.5%
1960	4,298		4.6%
1970	4,865		13.2%
1980	7,158		47.1%
1990	7,940		10.9%
2000	8,604		8.4%
2010	10,115		17.6%
2020	9,822		−2.9%
2024 (est.)	10,296		4.8%
U.S. Decennial Census

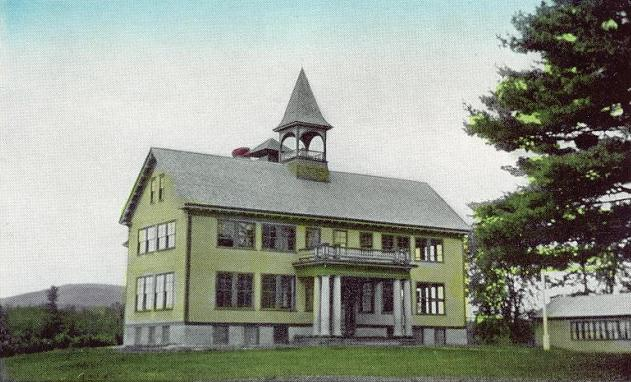
Conway Grammar School c. 1915

As of the census of 2010, there were 10,115 people, 4,479 households, and 2,638 families residing in the town. The population density was 145.7 inhabitants per square mile (56.3/km^{2}). There were 6,921 housing units at an average density of 99.7 units per square mile (38.5 units/km^{2}). The racial makeup of the town was 96.9% White, 0.3% African American, 0.4% Native American, 1.0% Asian, 0.04% Pacific Islander, 0.2% some other race, and 1.2% from two or more races. 1.0% of the population were Hispanic or Latino of any race.

There were 4,479 households, out of which 25.7% had children under the age of 18 living with them, 43.9% were headed by married couples living together, 10.4% had a female householder with no husband present, and 41.1% were non-families. 32.1% of all households were made up of individuals, and 11.4% were someone living alone who was 65 years of age or older. The average household size was 2.22, and the average family size was 2.78.

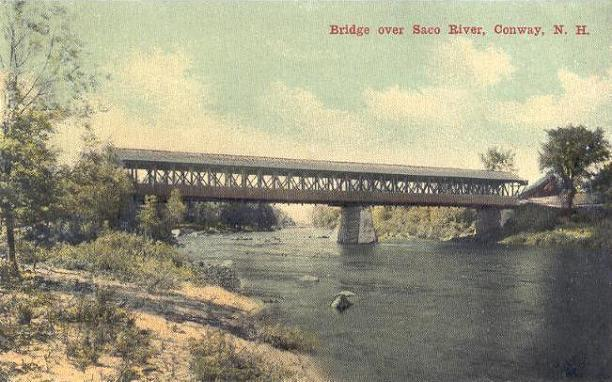
Bridge over Saco River in 1911

In the town, the population was spread out, with 19.7% under the age of 18, 6.8% from 18 to 24, 24.3% from 25 to 44, 32.1% from 45 to 64, and 17.2% who were 65 years of age or older. The median age was 44.5 years. For every 100 females, there were 96.8 males. For every 100 females age 18 and over, there were 92.9 males.

For the period 2007–2011, the estimated median annual income for a household in the town was $44,700, and the median income for a family was $52,083. Male full-time workers had a median income of $36,337 versus $32,525 for females. The per capita income for the town was $25,427. 12.5% of the population and 5.6% of families were below the poverty line, as well as 16.2% of people under the age of 18 and 13.2% of those 65 or older.

== Economy ==
Tourism plays a major role in Conway's economy, with the town providing access to the White Mountains. There is one ski area, Cranmore Mountain Resort, in Conway and several others nearby. North Conway is a major shopping destination with outlet and department stores. Hotels, bed and breakfasts, and inns can be found in every village, including the historic Eastern Slope Inn in North Conway.

In addition to tourism, the Mount Washington Valley Economic Council has been growing the technology industry through business parks and economic assistance. The largest technology employer in the region is The Echo Group, an electronic health record software developer.

With nearly 20% of Carroll County's population residing in Conway, the town is the commercial center for the county as well as a large area of rural western Maine, with heavy development along the portion of U.S. Route 302 and New Hampshire Route 16 that are co-signed through town. In addition to the factory outlet stores, there are also big-box stores, supermarkets, restaurants, and hotels.

== Government ==
Conway has a New England town form of government. The executive branch consists of the five-member board of selectmen who are elected, while the town manager is employed by the selectmen to be the chief administrator of the town. The legislative branch is the open town meeting. The town adopted this form in 1956.

John Eastman is the town manager of Conway.

== Education ==
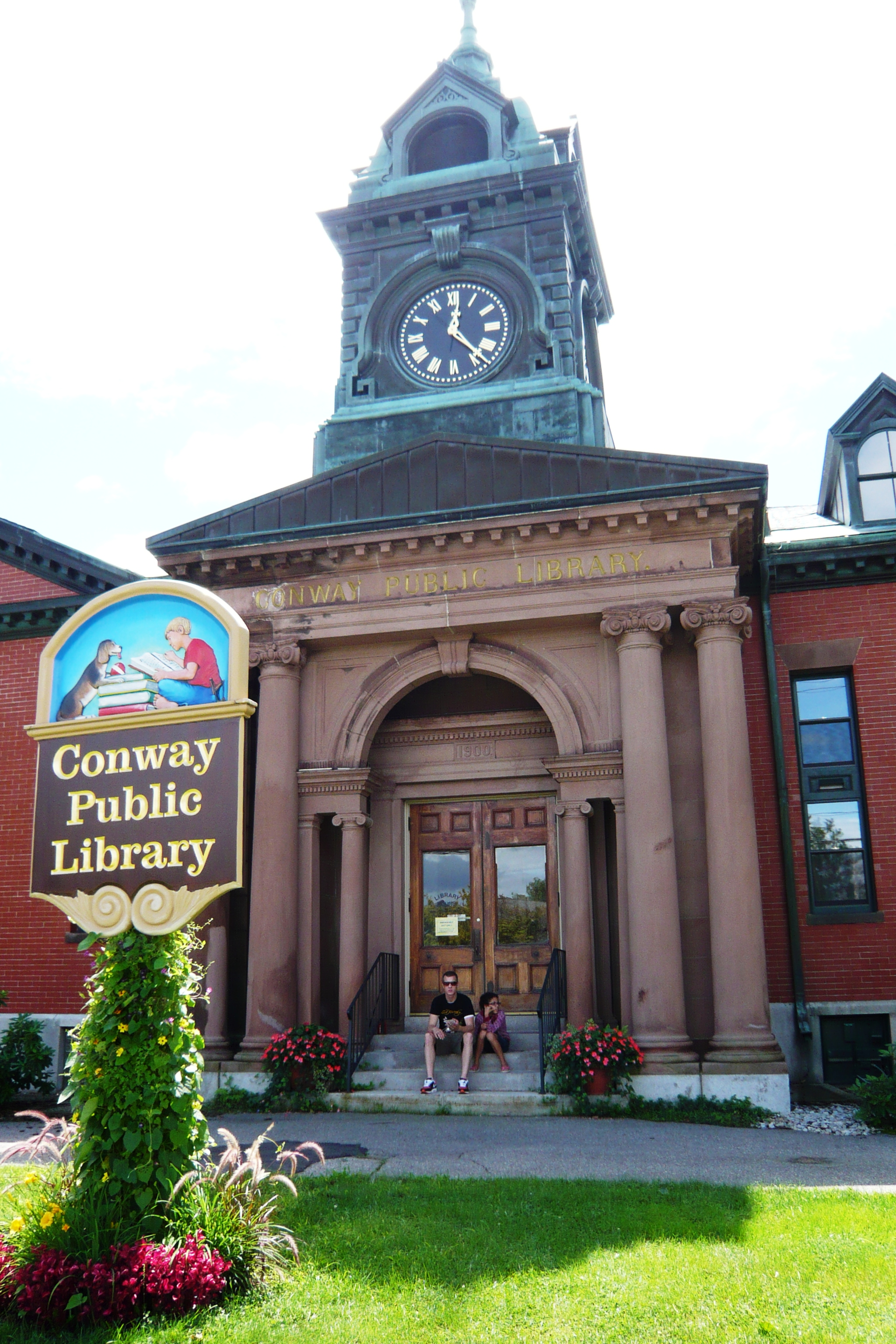
Library in Conway, New Hampshire

=== High school ===
- Kennett High School

=== Elementary and middle schools ===
- A. Crosby Kennett Middle School
- Conway Elementary School
- Pine Tree School
- John Fuller Elementary School
- Northeast Woodland Chartered Public School

A. Crosby Kennett High School, built in 1923, was located at 176 Main Street in Conway village until 2007, when a new building opened near the village of Redstone. The former high school building now houses the middle school.

=== Colleges ===
- Granite State College
- White Mountains Community College

== Culture ==
Located in the center of the popular White Mountain National Forest, Conway is the major commercial center for Bartlett, Jackson, Madison, Chatham, Eaton, Hart's Location, and Albany, New Hampshire as well as Fryeburg, Brownfield, Lovell, and Stow, Maine. There are a number of restaurants, two breweries, the year-round Cranmore Mountain Resort, over a hundred local and national stores, and several museums and theatres.

=== Museums ===
The Mount Washington Observatory's Weather Discovery Center, located in downtown North Conway, provides information and interactive exhibits on Mount Washington and the weather that surrounds it, and affords visitors the opportunity to video-conference with observers on the summit.

=== Sites of interest ===
- The Green Hills Preserve, owned by The Nature Conservancy, is in the north-central part of the town, to the east of North Conway.
- Echo Lake State Park is on the western side of town.
- Conway Common Lands State Forest is near the northern border of the town.
- Conway Scenic Railroad
- Tuckerman Brewing Company
- Salyards Center for the Arts
- New England Ski Museum Nordic Skiing Exhibit
- Swift and Saco River covered bridges

== Infrastructure ==
=== Transportation ===
Public bus service is operated by Tri-County Community Action Program Inc. The service, which is called the Blue Loon, operates five days a week.

The nearest airport is Eastern Slopes Regional Airport in Fryeburg, Maine. Eastern Slopes is a general aviation airport. Scheduled commercial service is available from Portland International Jetport in Portland, Maine and Manchester-Boston Regional Airport in Manchester, New Hampshire. Bus service connects Conway and Manchester via Concord Coach Lines.

Four New Hampshire State Routes, one U.S. Route, and one Maine State Route cross Conway.

- NH 16, White Mountain Highway, is the primary road through Conway, connecting Albany in the southwest to Bartlett in the north. It enters town in concurrency with NH 113 in the main village of Conway along Main Street. NH 113 leaves to the east along East Main Street, while NH 16 remains northbound out of the village. It meets US 302 near Redstone, and the two routes continue in concurrency through North Conway, and leaving town at the northern border in the village of Intervale into Bartlett.
- NH 112, the Kancamagus Highway, enters from Albany in the west and reaches its eastern terminus at NH 16/NH 113 in the main village of Conway.
- NH 113 enters town in concurrency with NH 16 from Albany in the west, continues along Main Street, leaves the concurrency at East Main Street towards Center Conway, and then reaches its eastern terminus at US 302 to the east of Center Conway.
- NH 153 enters town from the Eaton in the south, following Eaton Road to Pleasant Street, and meets its northern terminus at NH 16/NH 113 in the main village of Conway.
- US 302 enters at the town's northern border in concurrency with NH 16. Near the village of Redstone, it splits off along Eastman Road, then joins East Main Street through the village of Center Conway at the eastern terminus of NH 113. It leaves town at the Maine border into the town of Fryeburg.
- Maine State Route 113 enters Conway briefly as a bend in the Saco River prevents it from staying in Maine. It follows River Street, East Conway Road, and West Fryeburg Road. The route is maintained by the State of Maine, and despite the common number, does not connect to NH 113.

=== Hospitals ===
Memorial Hospital is located in North Conway. Memorial has a 24-hour emergency department.

== Media ==
The free Conway Daily Sun is published in Conway. Two other papers, The Carroll County Independent and The Mountain Ear also serve Conway. A local Outside Television affiliate broadcasts from North Conway. Several radio stations are based in or have outlets in Conway, including WHOM, WMWV, WOKQ, and WVMJ.

Valley Vision, a public-access network, is available on cable channel 3. The Town of Conway airs programming on Valley Vision under the name Conway Community Television (CCTV).

== Notable people ==
- Sean Doherty (born 1995), Olympic biathlete
- James Farrington (1791–1859), physician, banker, U.S. congressman from New Hampshire
- Donald Philbrick (1937–2022), politician
