= Kearsarge North =

Mountain in the American state of New Hampshire

- Pequawket
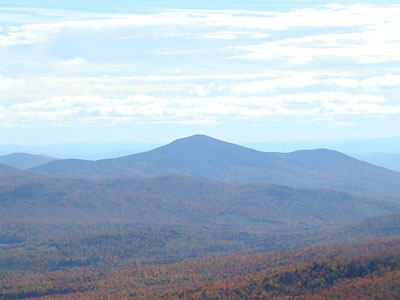
- Kearsarge North as seen from South Baldface

Highest point
- Elevation: 3,268 ft (996 m)
- Prominence: 1,748 ft (533 m)
- Coordinates: 44°06′20″N 71°05′39″W

Geography
- Location: Carroll County, New Hampshire, U.S.
- Parent range: White Mountains
- Topo map: USGS North Conway East

Climbing
- Easiest route: Hike Kearsarge North Trail from Hurricane Mtn Road.

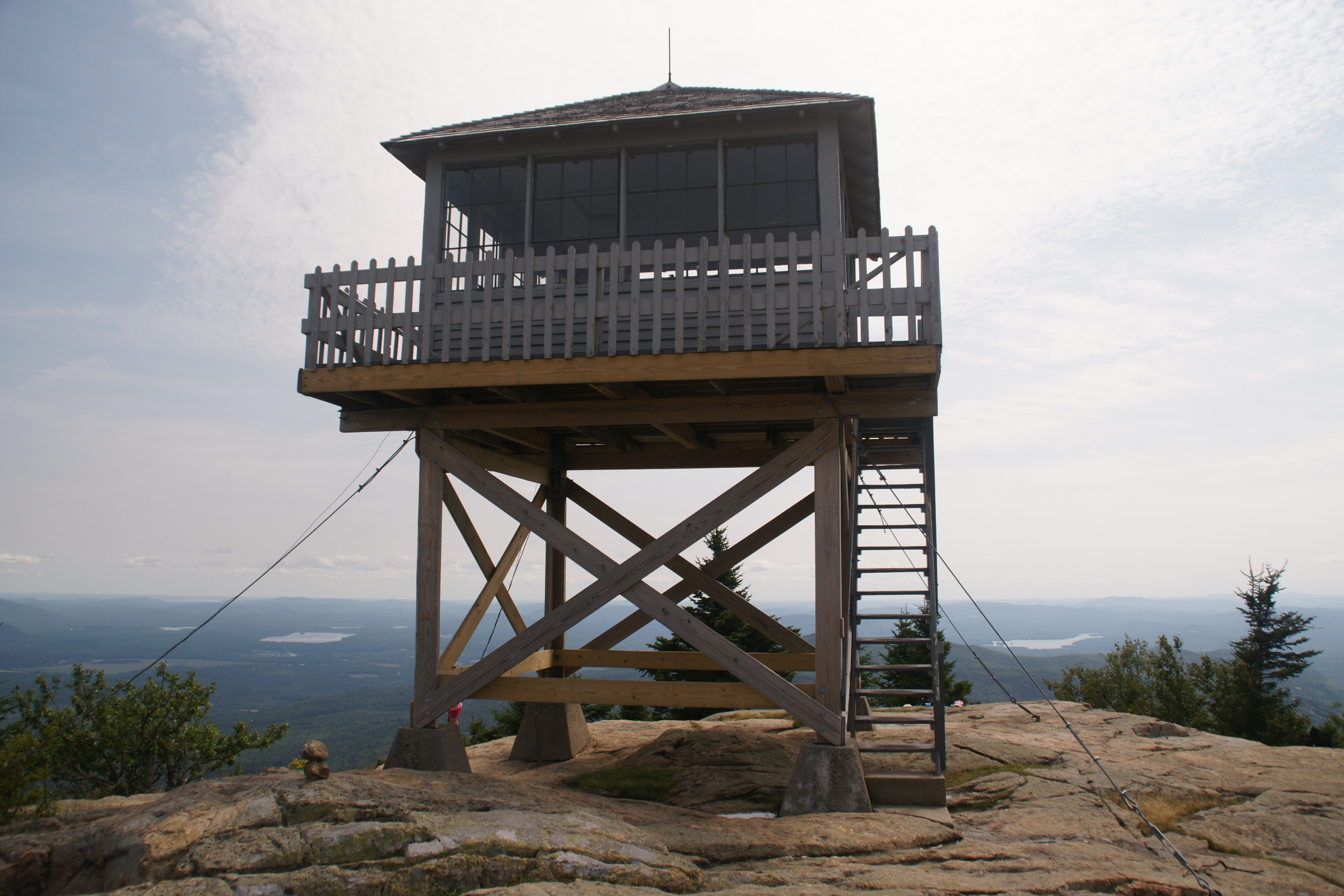
Pequawket fire tower

Kearsarge North is a mountain located about 4 miles (6 km) northeast of North Conway, Carroll County, New Hampshire, United States. The U.S. Board on Geographic Names accepted the name "Pequawket Mountain" in 1915 but it was renamed Kearsarge North in 1957. The Pequawket are a subdivision of the Abenaki people who formerly lived in the area. It is sometimes referred to as Mount Kearsarge, a name officially assigned to a mountain in Merrimack County.

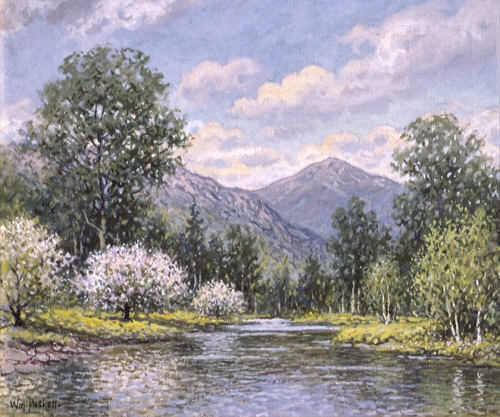
Mount Kearsarge in Spring by William F. Paskell (1866–1951)

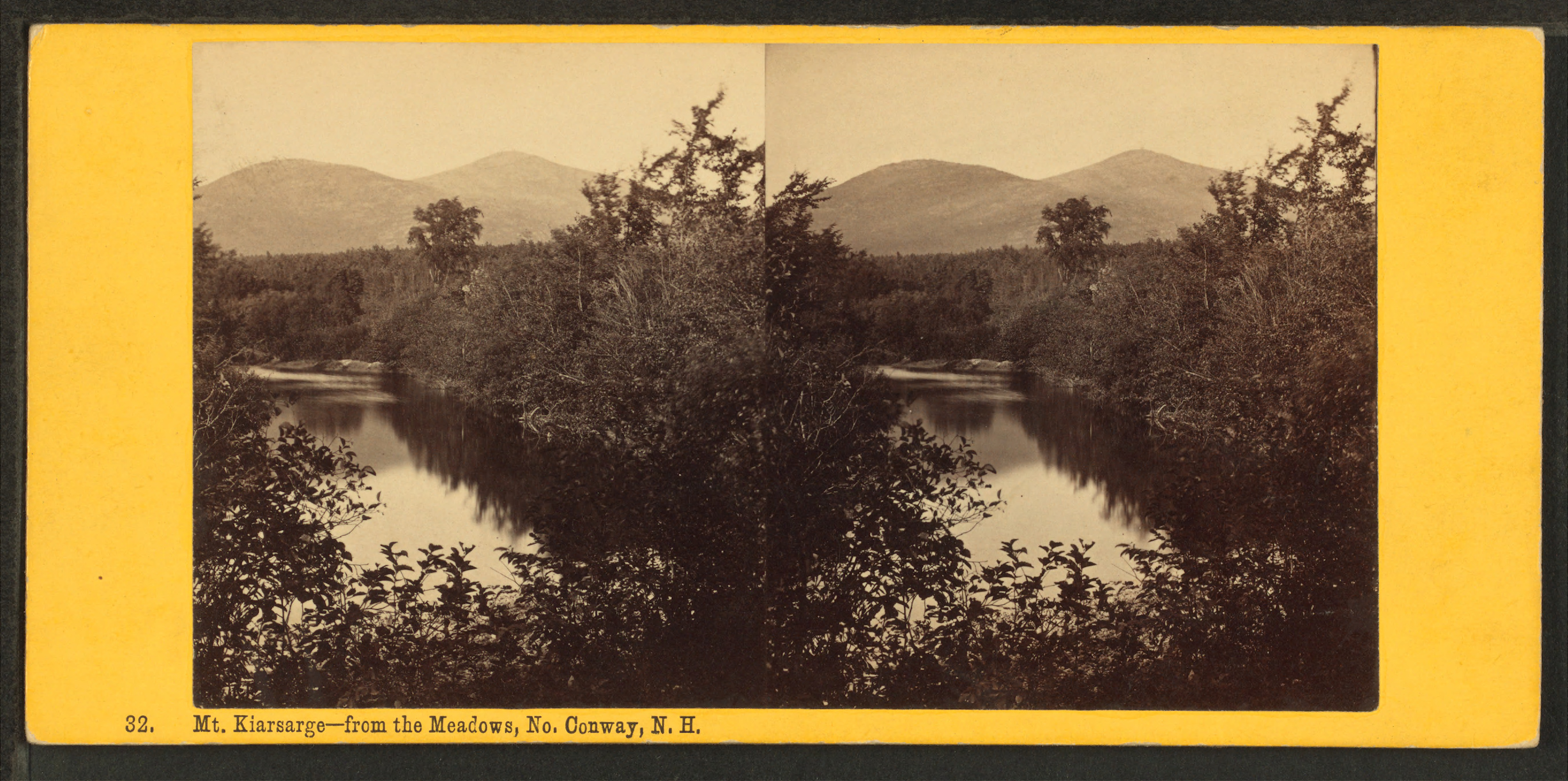
Stereoscopic image titled "Mt. Kiarsarge from the Meadows, No. Conway, N.H." by 19th century North Conway photographer Nathan W. Pease

Kearsarge North is located on the eastern fringe of the White Mountains. It is drained by various brooks into the Saco River.

There are two hiking routes up Kearsarge. The first, and most popular, is the 3.1-mile (5.0 km) Mount Kearsarge North Trail, which ascends 2,600 feet (790 m) from the North Conway side of Hurricane Mountain Road, near Intervale. The Weeks Brook Trail, a much less-used 4.7-mile (7.6 km) route, approaches Kearsarge from the east, from a trailhead on Forest Road 317 in Chatham. It has a slightly higher vertical gain at approximately 2,740 feet.

An inn was built on the summit, only to be twice destroyed by storms. In 1909, the Appalachian Mountain Club granted the New Hampshire Forestry Commission use of the destroyed hotel for a fire lookout.

== Pequawket Fire Tower ==
The Pequawket Fire Tower was built in 1913 and staffed by the state and the US Forest Service until 1960. In 1991, the fire tower was added to the National Historic Lookout Register, and is open to visitors to the summit of Kearsarge North.

== See also ==
- List of mountains in New Hampshire
- White Mountain National Forest
