= North Conway, New Hampshire =

Census-designated place in New Hampshire, United States

- Census-designated place
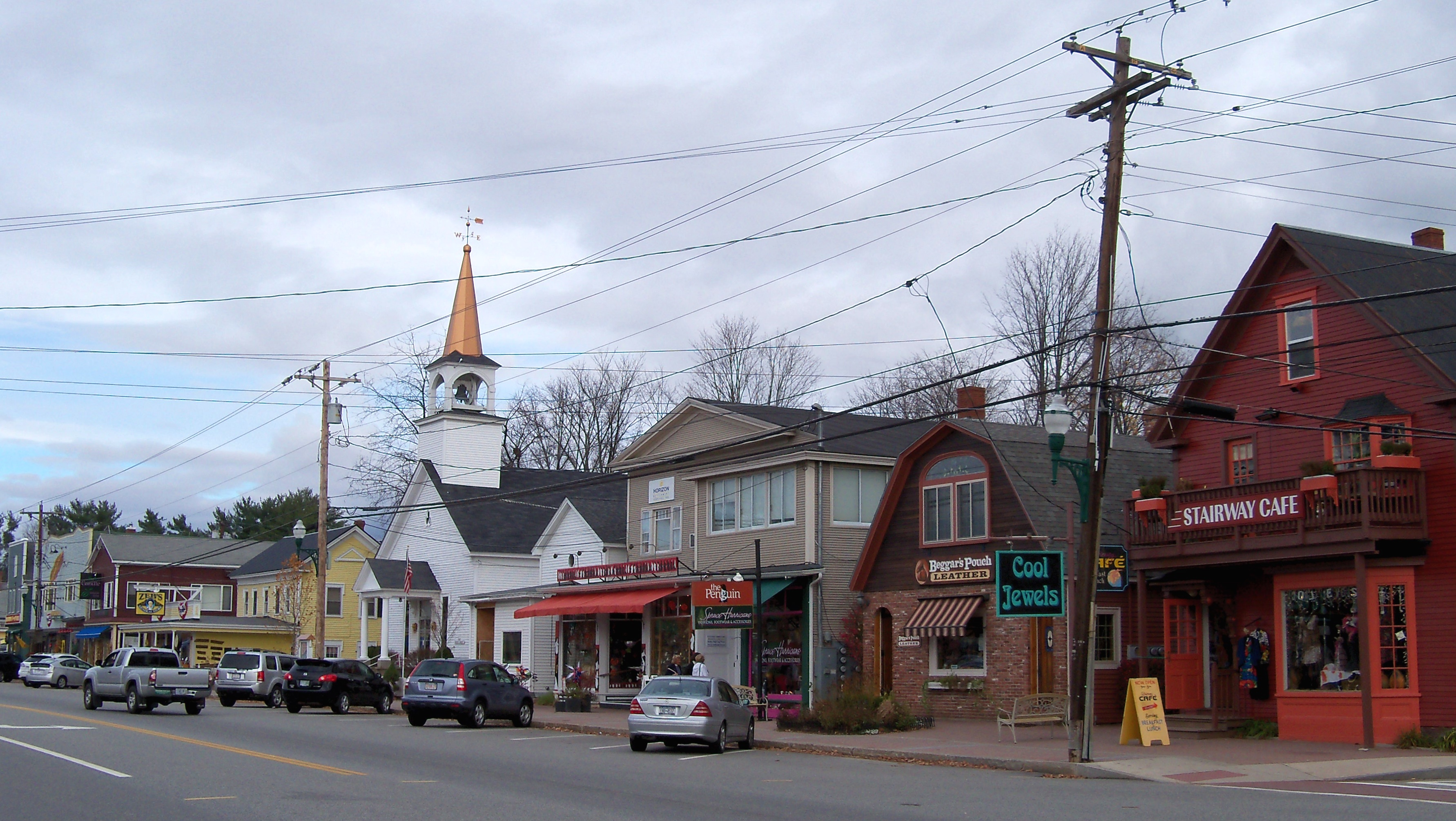
- Buildings in downtown North Conway

- Location within New Hampshire Location within the United States
- Coordinates: 44°03′13″N 71°07′42″W
- Country: United States
- State: New Hampshire
- County: Carroll
- Town: Conway

Area
  - Total: 6.96 sq mi (18.02 km^{2})
  - Land: 6.81 sq mi (17.65 km^{2})
  - Water: 0.14 sq mi (0.37 km^{2})
- Elevation: 581 ft (177 m)

Population (2020)
  - Total: 2,116
  - Density: 310.5/sq mi (119.89/km^{2})
- Time zone: UTC-5 (Eastern (EST))
  - Summer (DST): UTC-4 (EDT)
- ZIP codes: 03860 (North Conway); 03847 (Kearsarge)
- Area code: 603
- FIPS code: 33-53860
- GNIS feature ID: 2378085
- Website: www.conwaynh.org

North Conway is a census-designated place (CDP) and village in eastern Carroll County, New Hampshire, United States. The population was 2,116 at the 2020 census. A year-round resort area, North Conway is the second-largest village within the town of Conway, after the village of Conway proper. North Conway maintains its own fire station, post office and public library, sharing its other services with Conway. The White Mountain National Forest is to the west and north. The area is home to Cathedral Ledge (popular with climbers), Echo Lake State Park, and Cranmore Mountain Resort. North Conway is known for its large number of outlet shops.

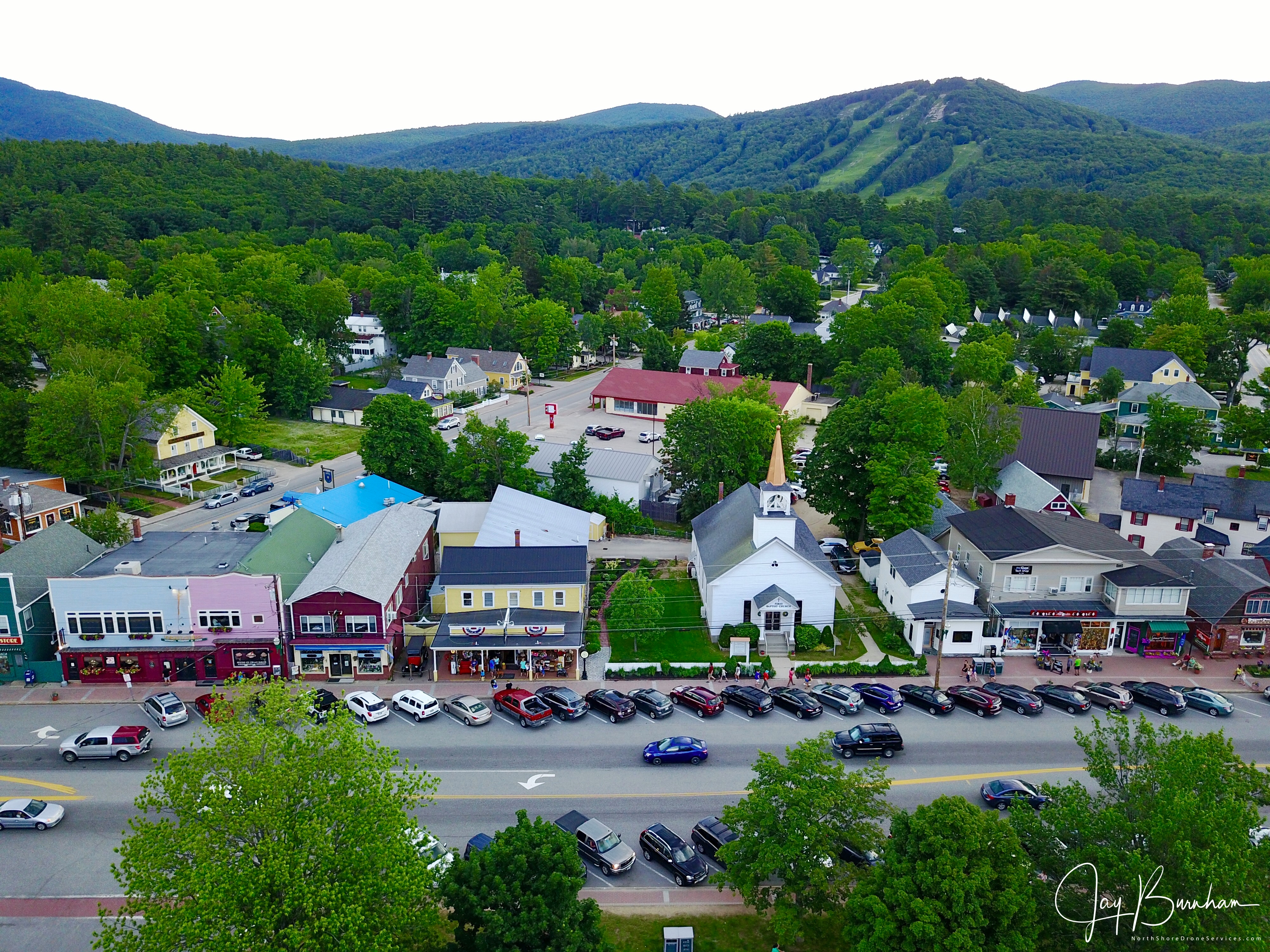
Aerial view of North Conway and Mount Cranmore

== History ==
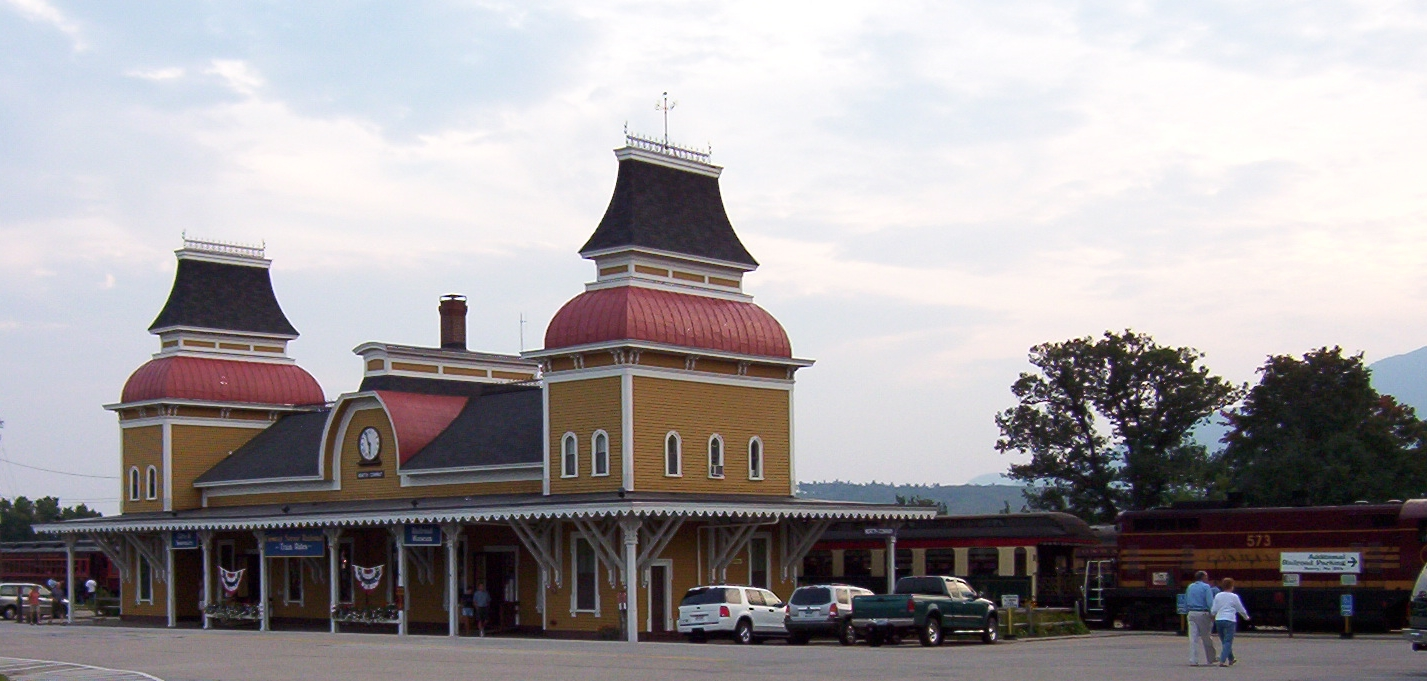
North Conway station

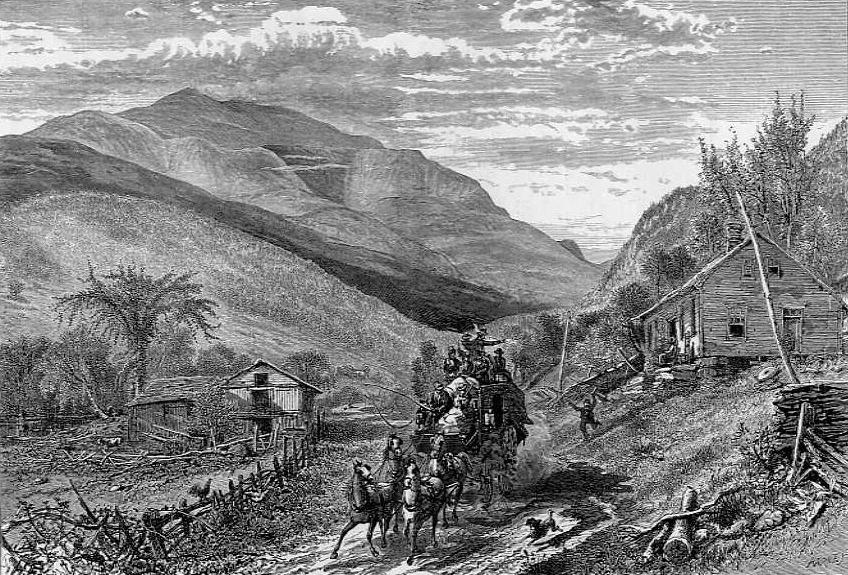
Mount Washington in 1872

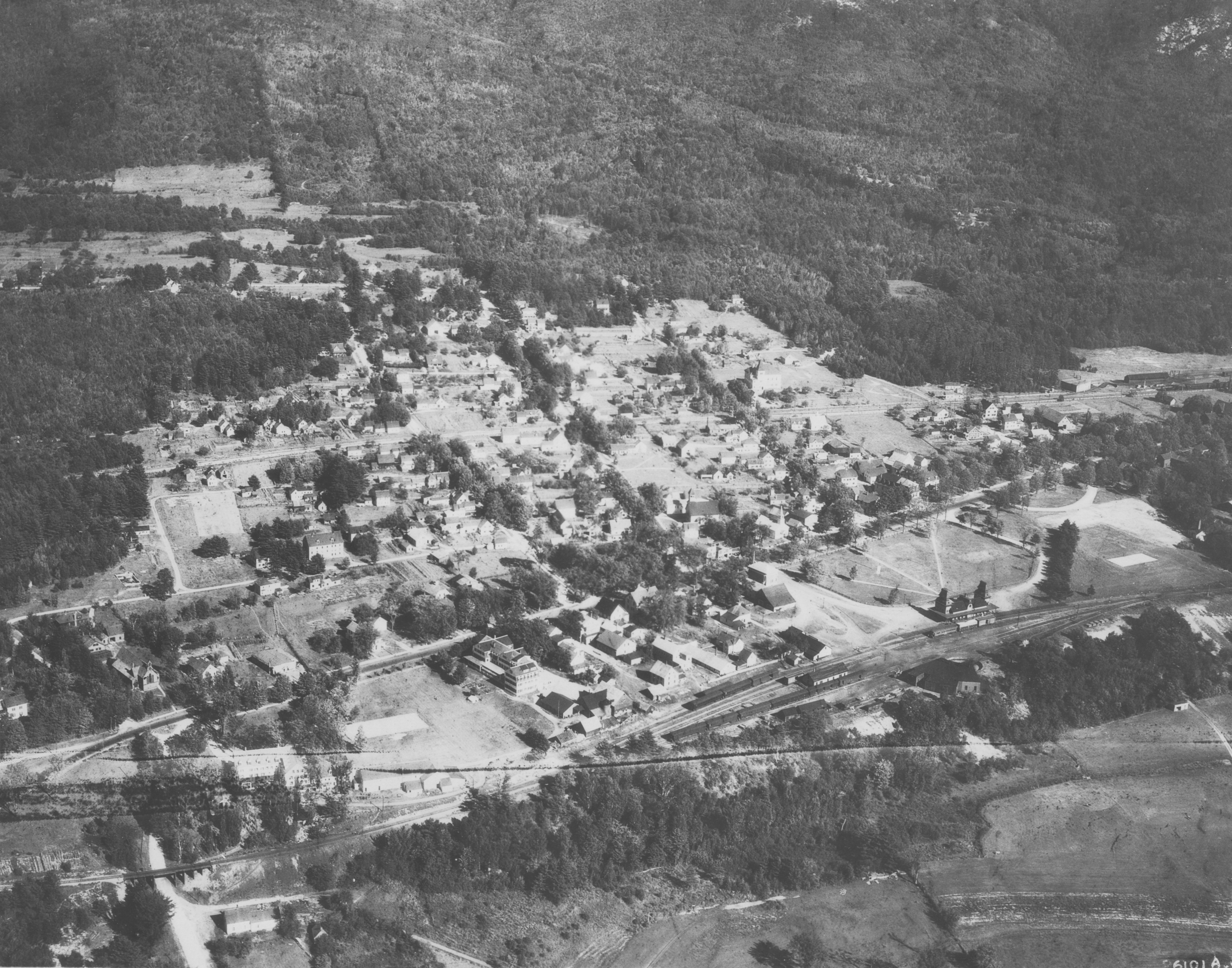
Aerial view of North Conway in 1921

Chartered in 1765 by colonial Governor Benning Wentworth, the town is named for Henry Seymour Conway, ambitious son of a prominent English family, who was elected to the House of Commons at age 20, fought at Culloden, and became Secretary of State. Early settlers called the area Pequawket (known colloquially as "Pigwacket"), adopting the name of the Abenaki Indian village which stretched down the Saco River to its stockaded center at Fryeburg, Maine.

North Conway is in the White Mountains, with Mount Washington to the northwest. The rugged terrain became popular in the 19th century with artists. Their paintings were known collectively as White Mountain art, which in turn attracted tourists to the area, particularly after the Portsmouth, Great Falls & Conway Railroad extended service in 1872 to North Conway. In 1874, the line built a Second Empire depot, designed by Nathaniel J. Bradlee. In 1932, "snow trains" began carrying enthusiasts to "the birthplace of American skiing", as North Conway is known.

== Recreation ==
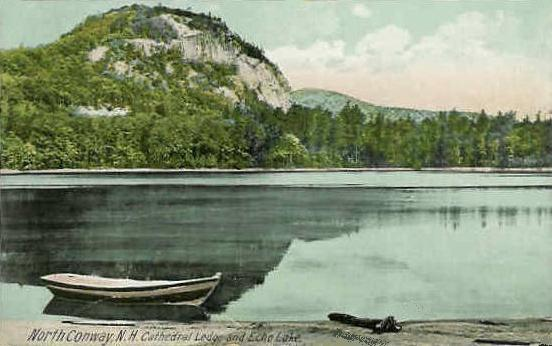
Cathedral Ledge in 1914

North Conway and its surrounding towns offer hiking in the White Mountain National Forest. The area is a major rock climbing destination in the northeastern United States, particularly Cathedral Ledge in Echo Lake State Park. The 500-foot (150 m) cliff overlooks Echo Lake and North Conway from the west. Unlike nearby White Horse Ledge, another rock climbing site, Cathedral Ledge has an automobile road to the summit, which provides fine views of the Saco River Valley.

In late September through early October, tourists arrive to see the autumn foliage on the surrounding mountains and forests. The Conway Scenic Railroad features train rides that leave from the village's Victorian station. In the winter, the village is the nighttime destination for skiers visiting the area resorts, including North Conway's own Cranmore Mountain as well as nearby Attitash Mountain Resort, Black Mountain and Wildcat Mountain.

North Conway is home to the Green Hills Preserve. The preserve encompasses several mountains in the Mt. Washington Valley, and is a low north–south running mountain ridge flanking the east side of Route 16. The preserve includes Rattlesnake Mountain, Middle Mountain, Peaked Mountain, and Black Cap mountain.

== Geography ==
North Conway is located in the northern part of the town of Conway.

According to the United States Census Bureau, the North Conway census-designated place (CDP) includes the village of North Conway plus the Conway portion of the neighboring community of Kearsarge. The CDP has a total area of 6.9 square miles (18.0 km^{2}), of which 6.8 square miles (17.7 km^{2}) are land and 0.2 square miles (0.4 km^{2}), or 2.04%, are water. The Saco River forms the western edge of the North Conway CDP.

=== Climate ===
Climate data for North Conway, New Hampshire (1991–2020 normals, extremes 1959–present)
Month	Jan	Feb	Mar	Apr	May	Jun	Jul	Aug	Sep	Oct	Nov	Dec	Year
Record high °F (°C)	61 (16)	71 (22)	85 (29)	92 (33)	98 (37)	102 (39)	100 (38)	103 (39)	98 (37)	88 (31)	78 (26)	71 (22)	103 (39)
Mean maximum °F (°C)	49.4 (9.7)	52.7 (11.5)	61.6 (16.4)	78.6 (25.9)	87.8 (31.0)	91.9 (33.3)	92.3 (33.5)	90.6 (32.6)	86.7 (30.4)	75.7 (24.3)	65.4 (18.6)	52.9 (11.6)	94.9 (34.9)
Mean daily maximum °F (°C)	30.0 (−1.1)	33.4 (0.8)	41.7 (5.4)	55.1 (12.8)	67.8 (19.9)	76.2 (24.6)	81.4 (27.4)	79.9 (26.6)	72.3 (22.4)	58.7 (14.8)	46.2 (7.9)	35.6 (2.0)	56.5 (13.6)
Daily mean °F (°C)	19.9 (−6.7)	22.3 (−5.4)	31.1 (−0.5)	43.2 (6.2)	55.4 (13.0)	64.6 (18.1)	69.7 (20.9)	67.9 (19.9)	60.0 (15.6)	47.7 (8.7)	36.8 (2.7)	26.6 (−3.0)	45.4 (7.5)
Mean daily minimum °F (°C)	9.9 (−12.3)	11.1 (−11.6)	20.4 (−6.4)	31.3 (−0.4)	43.0 (6.1)	53.1 (11.7)	58.0 (14.4)	55.9 (13.3)	47.7 (8.7)	36.6 (2.6)	27.3 (−2.6)	17.7 (−7.9)	34.3 (1.3)
Mean minimum °F (°C)	−9.4 (−23.0)	−6.9 (−21.6)	0.2 (−17.7)	20.7 (−6.3)	29.7 (−1.3)	41.1 (5.1)	48.5 (9.2)	45.9 (7.7)	33.5 (0.8)	24.6 (−4.1)	13.2 (−10.4)	0.1 (−17.7)	−12.0 (−24.4)
Record low °F (°C)	−34 (−37)	−34 (−37)	−22 (−30)	0 (−18)	18 (−8)	29 (−2)	33 (1)	26 (−3)	20 (−7)	10 (−12)	−4 (−20)	−24 (−31)	−34 (−37)
Average precipitation inches (mm)	3.60 (91)	3.18 (81)	3.67 (93)	4.41 (112)	3.68 (93)	4.53 (115)	4.50 (114)	4.39 (112)	3.67 (93)	5.46 (139)	4.47 (114)	4.55 (116)	50.11 (1,273)
Average snowfall inches (cm)	20.1 (51)	21.8 (55)	15.9 (40)	4.5 (11)	0.0 (0.0)	0.0 (0.0)	0.0 (0.0)	0.0 (0.0)	0.0 (0.0)	0.3 (0.76)	4.5 (11)	16.9 (43)	84.0 (213)
Average extreme snow depth inches (cm)	16.2 (41)	23.2 (59)	20.8 (53)	7.8 (20)	0.0 (0.0)	0.0 (0.0)	0.0 (0.0)	0.0 (0.0)	0.0 (0.0)	0.2 (0.51)	2.9 (7.4)	10.6 (27)	25.1 (64)
Average precipitation days (≥ 0.01 in)	11.2	9.3	10.4	11.3	13.4	14.0	13.5	11.4	10.5	12.8	11.5	12.4	141.7
Average snowy days (≥ 0.1 in)	9.7	8.0	6.9	2.3	0.0	0.0	0.0	0.0	0.0	0.1	2.7	8.1	37.8
Source: NOAA

== Demographics ==
Historical population
Census	Pop.	Note	%±
1960	1,104		—
1970	1,723		56.1%
1980	2,104		22.1%
1990	2,032		−3.4%
2000	2,069		1.8%
2010	2,349		13.5%
2020	2,116		−9.9%
U.S. Decennial Census

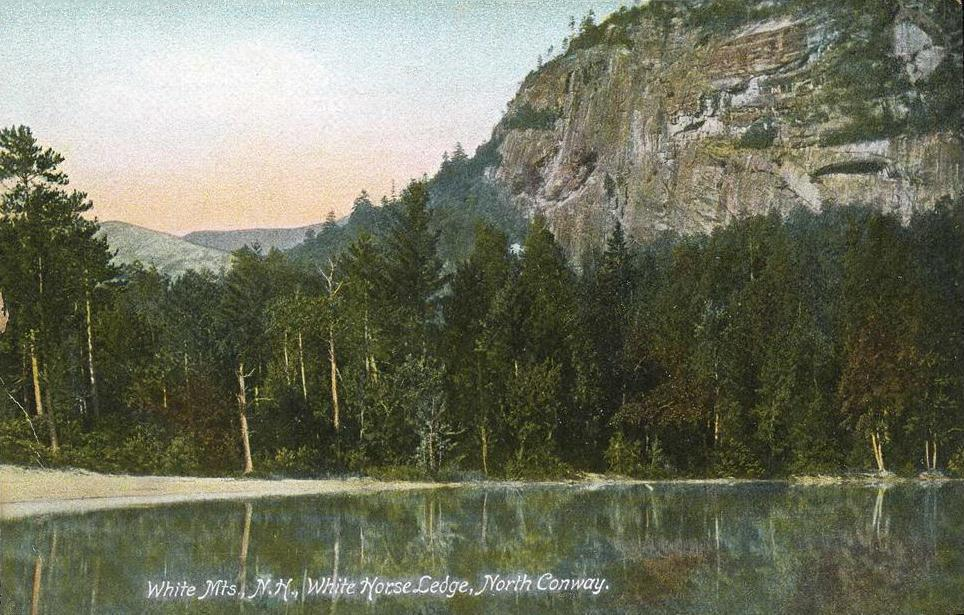
White Horse Ledge and Echo Lake c. 1908

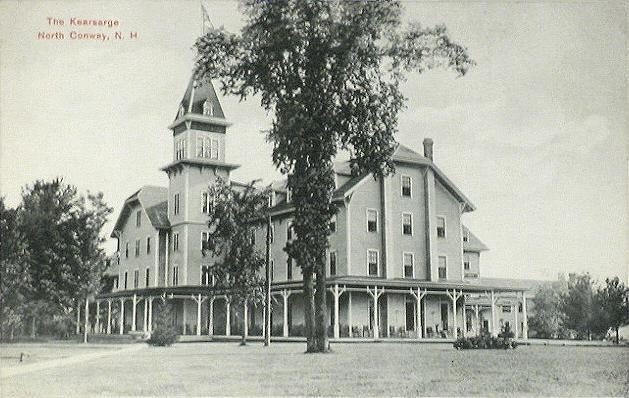
The Kearsarge House c. 1910, an early grand hotel

=== 2020 census ===
As of the 2020 census, North Conway had a population of 2,116. The median age was 53.5 years. 13.8% of residents were under the age of 18 and 29.2% of residents were 65 years of age or older. For every 100 females there were 97.0 males, and for every 100 females age 18 and over there were 91.7 males age 18 and over.

84.4% of residents lived in urban areas, while 15.6% lived in rural areas.

There were 1,047 households in North Conway, of which 19.9% had children under the age of 18 living in them. Of all households, 33.8% were married-couple households, 24.1% were households with a male householder and no spouse or partner present, and 31.6% were households with a female householder and no spouse or partner present. About 39.6% of all households were made up of individuals and 17.3% had someone living alone who was 65 years of age or older.

There were 1,536 housing units, of which 31.8% were vacant. The homeowner vacancy rate was 0.9% and the rental vacancy rate was 13.5%.

Racial composition as of the 2020 census
Race	Number	Percent
White	1,963	92.8%
Black or African American	5	0.2%
American Indian and Alaska Native	5	0.2%
Asian	45	2.1%
Native Hawaiian and Other Pacific Islander	0	0.0%
Some other race	5	0.2%
Two or more races	93	4.4%
Hispanic or Latino (of any race)	34	1.6%

=== 2010 census ===
As of the census of 2010, there were 2,349 people, 1,105 households, and 547 families residing in the CDP. The population density was 546.3 inhabitants per square mile (210.9/km^{2}). There were 1,804 housing units, of which 699, or 38.7%, were vacant. 551 of the vacant units were seasonal or vacation properties. The racial makeup of the CDP was 94.7% White, 0.5% African American, 0.4% Native American, 2.0% Asian, 0.1% Native Hawaiian or other Pacific Islander, 0.6% some other race, and 1.7% from two or more races. Hispanic or Latino of any race were 1.6% of the population.

There were 1,105 households, out of which 23.3% had children under the age of 18 living with them, 33.1% were headed by married couples living together, 11.4% had a female householder with no husband present, and 50.5% were non-families. 39.9% of all households were made up of individuals, and 12.8% were someone living alone who was 65 years of age or older. The average household size was 2.07, and the average family size was 2.73.

In the CDP, the population was spread out, with 18.6% under the age of 18, 8.4% from 18 to 24, 26.8% from 25 to 44, 29.1% from 45 to 64, and 16.8% who were 65 years of age or older. The median age was 42.1 years. For every 100 females, there were 99.9 males. For every 100 females age 18 and over, there were 92.5 males.

=== Income and poverty ===
For the period 2007–11, the estimated median annual income for a household in the CDP was $40,804, and the median income for a family was $46,832. Male full-time workers had a median income of $31,764 versus $23,859 for females. The per capita income for the CDP was $21,664. About 12.1% of families and 21.9% of the population were below the poverty line.

== Notable people ==
- Ed Ashnault — college football and basketball coach; grew up in North Conway
- Benjamin Champney — artist
- Gordon Clapp — actor
- E. E. Cummings — 20th century poet; summer resident
- Jigger Johnson — logger
- Jeff Locke — Major League Baseball player
- Helen Bigelow Merriman — 19th century artist born in North Conway
- Nathan W. Pease — photographer who lived and worked capturing images of area sites
- Carroll Reed — ski instructor; founder of Carroll Reed Sportswear
- Johann "Hannes" Schneider — Austrian ski instructor and founder of the Arlberg Technique
- John Shea — actor, producer and director
- David A. Shirley — chemist
- Leanne Smith — two-time Olympian and World Cup alpine ski racer
- Martha Pearson Smith (1836-?) — poet, musician, temperance activist
- Julia Ruth Stevens — daughter of Babe Ruth
- Kenneth Ward — politician

== Sites of interest ==
- Echo Lake State Park
- Cranmore Mountain

Sites on the National Register of Historic Places:

- North Conway 5 and 10 Cent Store
- Eastern Slope Inn
- Conway Scenic Railroad

== See also ==
North Conway is a village within the town of Conway. The other villages within Conway are:

- Conway village
- Center Conway
- Kearsarge
- Redstone
- White Mountain Airport
