= Cranmore Mountain Resort =

Ski area in New Hampshire, United States

Coordinates: 44°03′23″N 71°06′36″W

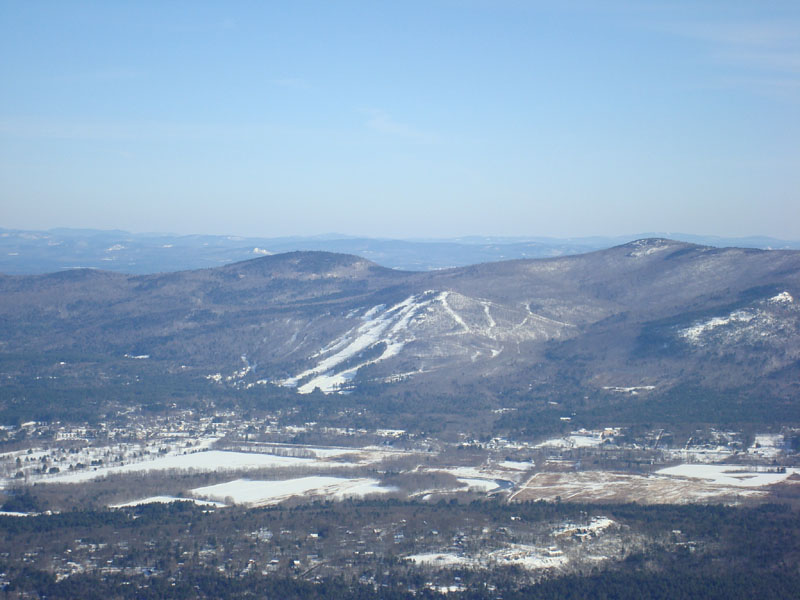
- Cranmore Mountain
- Interactive map of Cranmore Mountain Resort
- Location: North Conway, New Hampshire, US
- Vertical: 1,200 ft (370 m)
- Trails: 56: 28% beginner; 44% intermediate; 28% advanced
- Longest run: 1 m (3 ft 3 in)
- Lift system: 5 chairs, 2 surface lifts
- Snowmaking: 100%
- Website: http://www.cranmore.com/

Cranmore Mountain Resort, operating in the summer with a Mountain Adventure Park, is a ski area located in North Conway, New Hampshire, United States. It began operations in the winter of 1937–38, and was owned until 1984 by the Schneider family. During the late 1980s and 1990s, ownership of the resort changed hands several times; it is now owned by a group of New England businessmen and is undergoing several years of expansion and modernization.

== History ==
Cranmore was founded by local businessman Harvey Gibson and opened for the 1937–1938 season with a single rope tow. For the 1938–1939 season, a new lift, dubbed the Skimobile, which consisted of small cars traveling on a wooden track and was designed by area mechanic George Morton, was installed, rising from the base to about halfway up the mountain. In its early years, Cranmore distinguished itself from other ski areas by its Skimobile, a relatively developed base area and lodging, and a ski school run by European skiers.

In 1939, prominent Austrian skier Hannes Schneider moved to Cranmore at the invitation of Gibson after having been briefly imprisoned in Austria for his anti-Nazi views. Schneider spurred the expansion of Cranmore, with a second stage of the Skimobile installed to the summit and additional trails cut.

During the early 1940s, Cranmore was one of the first ski areas to take an interest in developing trail grooming technology, due to its west-facing exposure, which melted snow during the day that subsequently refroze into ice overnight.

In 1955, the East Bowl area was opened with the construction of a new Roebling double chair; this was followed in 1963 and 1969 by two new Mueller double chairs. Cranmore was sold in 1984 by Herbert Schneider; the new owners installed two new triple chairs in 1986 and 1987. By 1988, the entirety of the Skimobile had been abandoned, and in the early 1990s ownership of Cranmore had changed hands again, with the Bank of Boston purchasing the area, though it was subsequently sold again in 1995 to LBO Resort Enterprises; these owners installed a new Doppelmayr high-speed quad to the summit.

In 1996, LBO and S-K-I merged to form the American Skiing Company, which, facing antitrust concerns from the US Justice Department, sold Cranmore and Waterville Valley Resort to Booth Creek Ski Holdings that November. Booth Creek owned Cranmore until June 2010, when the resort was sold to Brian Fairbank, Tyler Fairbank, and Joseph O'Donnell, operators of the Jiminy Peak ski area in Massachusetts. Immediately after taking control of Cranmore, the new owners announced a multimillion-dollar expansion, including a new Doppelmayr quad chair, new snowmaking, a new mountain coaster and a rebuilt tubing park.

In March 2012, Cranmore announced plans to replace the East double chair, at the time the oldest operating double in New England, with a triple chair purchased from Wachusett Mountain for the 2012–13 season. In 2019, the mountain opened its ski and snowboard season on November 16, the earliest opening in resort history.

== Mountain statistics ==
Cranmore has over 170 acres (69 ha) of skiable terrain, with 56 trails and glades served by 7 lifts—a high-speed quad, a fixed-grip quad, two fixed-grip triples, one fixed-grip double and two surface lifts. 28% of the terrain is designated as easy, 46% is rated intermediate and 26% is expert. The longest run is about 1 mile (1.6 km) long, and all terrain has snowmaking installed. The vertical drop of the mountain is 1,200 feet (370 m).

== Summer ==
In the summer Cranmore operates with a Mountain Adventure Park, including Summer Tubing (using a solid, manmade, slippery base material in place of snow), Bungy Trampoline, Mountain Coaster, Giant Swing, Scenic Chairlift, a Climbing Wall, Spyder Mountain, and more. Cranmore also has New England's newest lift accessed Downhill Mountain Bike Park with a competitive youth race series.
