= Bartlett, New Hampshire =

- Town
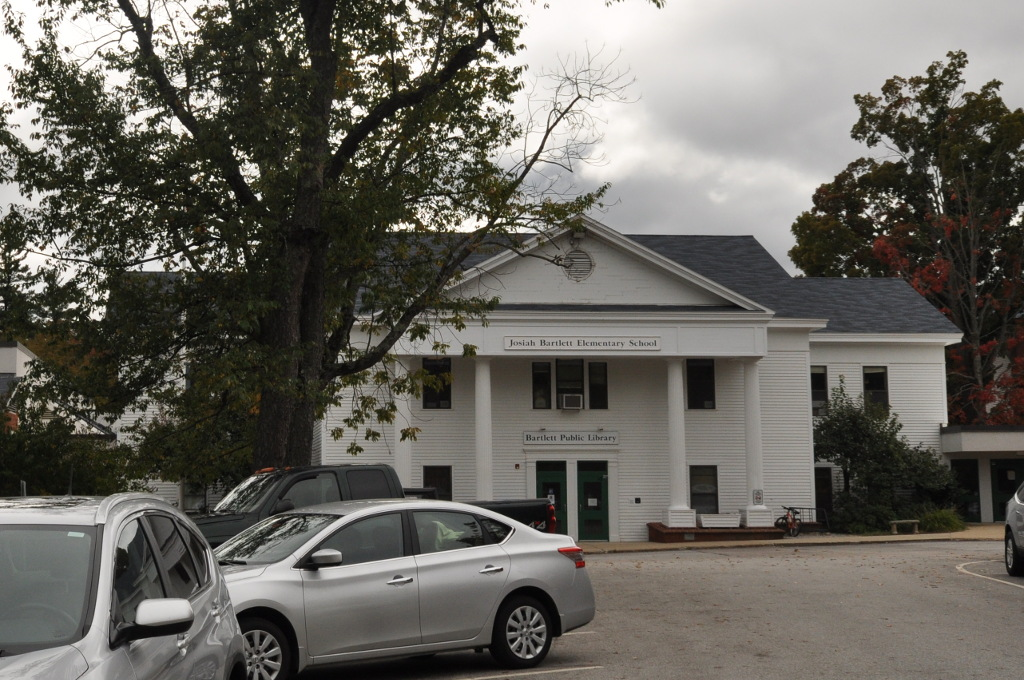
- Bartlett Elementary School and Library
- Motto: "In the Heart of the White Mountains"
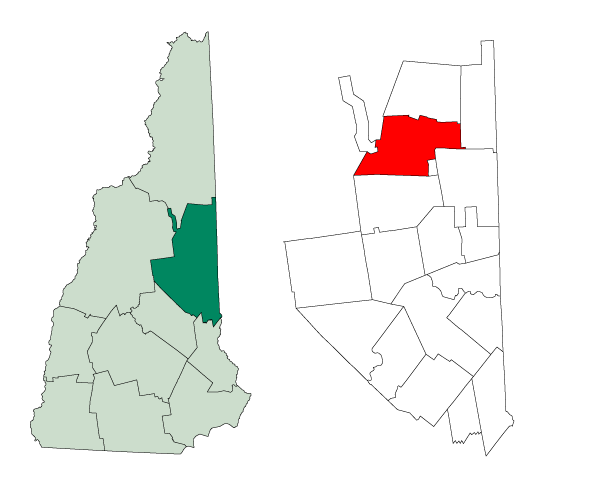
- Location in Carroll County, New Hampshire
- Coordinates: 44°04′40″N 71°14′38″W
- Country: United States
- State: New Hampshire
- County: Carroll
- Incorporated: 1790
- Villages: Bartlett; Glen; Intervale; Lower Bartlett

Area
  - Total: 75.2 sq mi (194.8 km^{2})
  - Land: 74.8 sq mi (193.7 km^{2})
  - Water: 0.42 sq mi (1.1 km^{2}) 0.57%
- Elevation: 748 ft (228 m)

Population (2020)
  - Total: 3,200
  - Density: 43/sq mi (16.5/km^{2})
- Time zone: UTC-5 (Eastern)
  - Summer (DST): UTC-4 (Eastern)
- ZIP codes: 03812 (Bartlett); 03838 (Glen); 03845 (Intervale); 03860 (North Conway)
- Area code: 603
- FIPS code: 33-03700
- GNIS feature ID: 873539
- Website: www.townofbartlett.nh.gov

Bartlett is a town in Carroll County, New Hampshire, United States. The population was 3,200 at the 2020 census, and an estimated 3,335 in 2025, up from 2,788 at the 2010 census. Bartlett includes the unincorporated community of Glen as well as portions of the communities of Kearsarge and Intervale, which the town shares with the neighboring town of Conway. It is set in the White Mountains and is surrounded by the White Mountain National Forest. It is home to the Attitash Mountain Resort and the Story Land theme park.

The main village in town, where 351 people resided at the 2020 census, is defined by the U.S. Census Bureau as the Bartlett census-designated place and is located at the intersection of U.S. Route 302 with Bear Notch Road (Albany Avenue).

== History ==
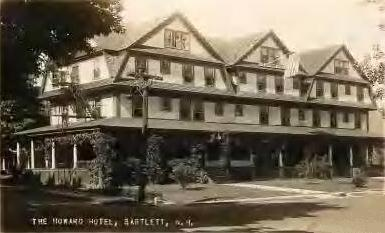
Howard Hotel c. 1920

Settled after 1769 and incorporated in 1790, the town is named for Dr. Josiah Bartlett, the first chief executive to bear the name "governor", a representative to the Continental Congress, and one of New Hampshire's three signers of the Declaration of Independence. Dr. Bartlett founded the New Hampshire Medical Society in 1791. Bartlett became a railroad town in 1875 when the Maine Central Railroad's Mountain Division was built. In 1954, Story Land, a theme park designed for young children, opened in Glen. Attitash ski area opened in the 1960s.

The Bartlett Roundhouse in Bartlett village was listed on the National Register of Historic Places in September 2015.

== Tourism ==
Bartlett's views of the White Mountains have long made tourism a principal business. The town has one covered bridge. Attitash ski area is the sixth largest ski area (by total slope length) in New Hampshire. Bartlett also is home to the Bear Notch Ski Touring area affording Nordic ski enthusiasts trails in the upper Saco River Valley. Bartlett is also an attraction for railfans. The Conway Scenic Railroad, a heritage railway in nearby North Conway, operates a train to the town daily for sightseeing in the spring, summer, and fall.

== Geography ==
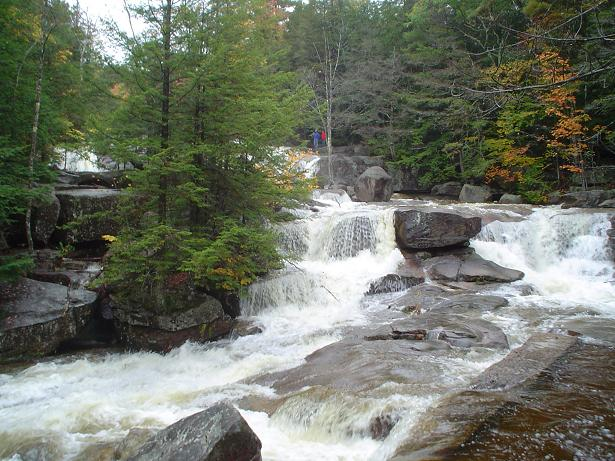
Diana's Baths on Lucy Brook

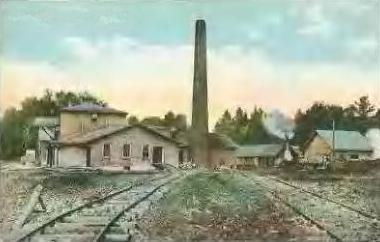
Kearsarge Peg Mill c. 1910

According to the United States Census Bureau, the town has a total area of 75.2 square miles (194.8 km^{2}), of which 74.8 square miles (193.7 km^{2}) are land and 0.4 square miles (1.1 km^{2}), or 0.57%, are water. Bartlett is drained by the Saco River and its tributary, the Ellis River. The highest point in Bartlett is Mount Tremont, elevation 3,371 feet (1,027 m). Mount Parker, elevation 3,004 ft (916 m), is in the north, and Bear Mountain, elevation 3,200 ft (980 m), is on the southern boundary.

In addition to the town center, Bartlett includes the following villages within its limits:

- Glen, home to the Story Land amusement park
- Intervale, a resort community
- Lower Bartlett, between Glen and Intervale, along the East Branch Saco River

Goodrich Falls on the Ellis River is in the northern part of the town, next to NH 16.

== Demographics ==
Historical population
Census	Pop.	Note	%±
1850	761		—
1860	735		−3.4%
1870	629		−14.4%
1880	1,044		66.0%
1890	1,247		19.4%
1900	1,013		−18.8%
1910	1,197		18.2%
1920	1,059		−11.5%
1930	1,119		5.7%
1940	1,154		3.1%
1950	1,074		−6.9%
1960	1,013		−5.7%
1970	1,098		8.4%
1980	1,566		42.6%
1990	2,290		46.2%
2000	2,705		18.1%
2010	2,788		3.1%
2020	3,200		14.8%
2024 (est.)	3,323		3.8%
U.S. Decennial Census

As of the census of 2010, there were 2,788 people, 1,307 households, and 762 families residing in the town. There were 4,115 housing units, of which 2,808, or 68.2%, were vacant. 2,691 of the vacant units were for seasonal or recreational use. The racial makeup of the town was 97.7% white, 0.3% African American, 0.3% Native American, 0.4% Asian, 0.0% Native Hawaiian or Pacific Islander, 0.0% some other race, and 1.3% from two or more races. 0.9% of the population were Hispanic or Latino of any race.

Of the 1,307 households, 21.8% had children under the age of 18 living with them, 46.4% were headed by married couples living together, 8.1% had a female householder with no husband present, and 41.7% were non-families. 31.4% of all households were made up of individuals, and 11.3% were someone living alone who was 65 years of age or older. The average household size was 2.13, and the average family size was 2.66.

In the town, 17.4% of the population were under the age of 18, 5.2% were from 18 to 24, 20.7% from 25 to 44, 36.3% from 45 to 64, and 20.5% were 65 years of age or older. The median age was 49.0 years. For every 100 females, there were 99.3 males. For every 100 females age 18 and over, there were 99.2 males.

For the period 2011–2015, the estimated median annual income for a household was $50,536, and the median income for a family was $80,229. The per capita income for the town was $35,700. 10.0% of the population and 5.0% of families were below the poverty line. 8.2% of the population under the age of 18 and 5.7% of those 65 or older were living in poverty.

== Transportation ==
Two New Hampshire State Routes and one U.S. Route cross Bartlett.

- NH 16, the White Mountain Highway, forms the main north-south route through Bartlett. It enters from the south in concurrency with US 302 in the village of Intervale, then splits to the north on Pinkham Notch Road in the village of Glen, before leaving into the town of Jackson to the north.
- NH 16A, the Intervale Resort Loop, runs parallel to NH 16 and provides access to the resort areas of Intervale.
- US 302 enters town from the west at Hart's Location after descending through Crawford Notch. It enters the main village of Bartlett as Main Street. After passing the Attitash Mountain resort, it crosses the Saco River and joins NH 16 at the village of Glen. The two routes continue in concurrency southbound through the village of Intervale and enter Conway at the southern border.
