= Kennywood Entertainment Company =

Defunct American amusement park chain

- Company type: Private
- Industry: Amusement parks
- Founded: 1906
- Defunct: 2007
- Fate: Sold to Parques Reunidos
- Headquarters: West Mifflin, Pennsylvania
- Area served: Pennsylvania, Connecticut, and New Hampshire

Kennywood Entertainment Company was the operator of five United States amusement parks in Western Pennsylvania, Connecticut, and New Hampshire.

== History ==
Kennywood Entertainment Co. was effectively created in 1906, when F. W. Henninger and Andrew McSwigan bought the Kennywood amusement park from the Mellon family's Monongahela Railway Company. The two families controlled the park and its future sister parks until they sold the parks in 2007. In 1983, they acquired Idlewild Park from the MacDonald family, who had owned it since acquiring it from the Mellons in 1952. In 1989, they opened Sandcastle Waterpark just a few miles from Kennywood. They acquired Lake Compounce in Bristol, Connecticut, in 1996, and Story Land in Glen, New Hampshire in 2007.

On December 11, 2007, Kennywood Entertainment announced that it would be selling all five of its amusement parks to Parques Reunidos, a company based in Madrid, Spain. From 2009 until its sale to Herschend in 2025, Palace Entertainment, the former American subsidiary of Parques Reunidos, took over the role formerly filled by Kennywood Entertainment.

== Amusement parks ==
- Idlewild and Soak Zone, in Ligonier, Pennsylvania
- Kennywood, near Pittsburgh in West Mifflin, Pennsylvania
- Lake Compounce, in Bristol, Connecticut
- Sandcastle Waterpark, also near Pittsburgh in West Homestead, Pennsylvania
- Story Land, in Glen, New Hampshire
