= North Conway station =

North Conway
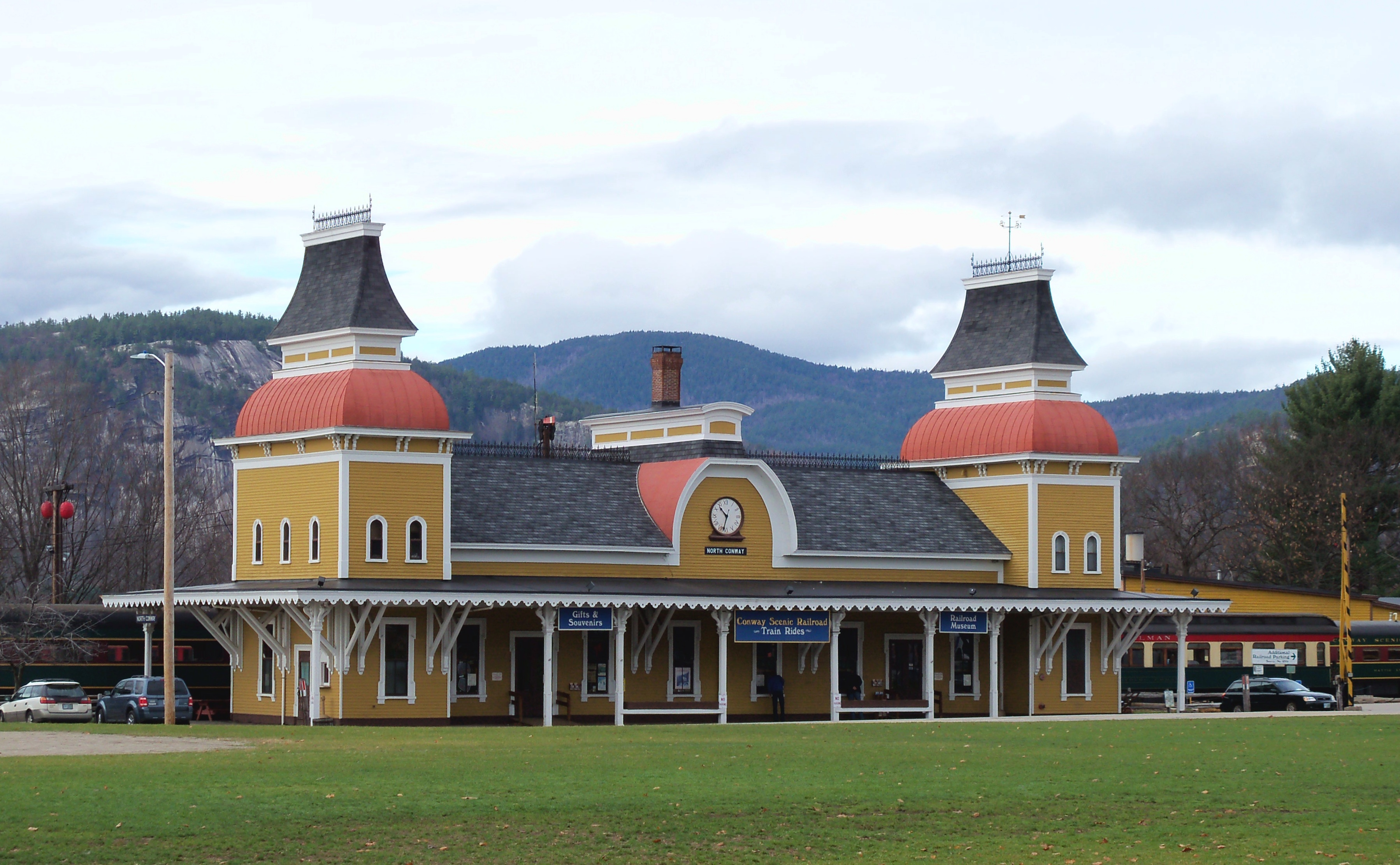
- North Conway station in 2012

General information
- Location: 38 Norcross Circle; North Conway, New Hampshire; United States
- Coordinates: 44°3′6″N 71°7′44″W
- Owner: Conway Scenic Railroad
- Tracks: 1

History
- Opened: 1874
- Closed: 1961
- North Conway Depot and Railroad Yard
- U.S. National Register of Historic Places
- U.S. Historic district
- Built: 1874
- Architect: Nathaniel J. Bradlee
- Architectural style: Russian-Victorian
- NRHP reference No.: 79003792
- Added to NRHP: August 10, 1979
Location

North Conway station is a railway station located in North Conway, New Hampshire. Built in 1874, the depot was designed by Nathaniel J. Bradlee in an eclectic Russian-Victorian style. The station is also the terminus for the Conway Scenic Railroad. Northwest of the station stands a roundhouse, which now houses the Scenic Railroad's rolling stock; it was built around the same time as the station. The yard and depot were added to the National Register of Historic Places in 1979 as North Conway Depot and Railroad Yard.

== Architecture ==
As the northern terminal, North Conway Depot was built to be the most impressive station on the Conway Branch. Architect Nathaniel J. Bradlee used a unique, Russian-inspired Victorian design. The station's floor plan includes a ticket office, a baggage room, and two waiting rooms (one for men and one for women). One of the waiting rooms now serves as a gift shop. Two curving mahogany staircases lead to offices in metal-sheathed domed towers on the second level. An eight-day E. Howard & Co. clock faces the town. The area immediately in front of the station is an open park.

In addition to the station, the yard also includes a freight station, some maintenance of way sheds, and a four-stall roundhouse with an 85-foot (26 m) air-powered turntable, all of which are contemporary with the passenger depot. The roundhouse and turntable are still used by the Conway Scenic Railroad for maintenance and operations of their equipment, and the freight station houses a model railroad. There is also a baggage car that was converted by the Boston & Maine into a crew bunkhouse in 1949, and it too is still used for this purpose by the heritage railroad.

== History ==
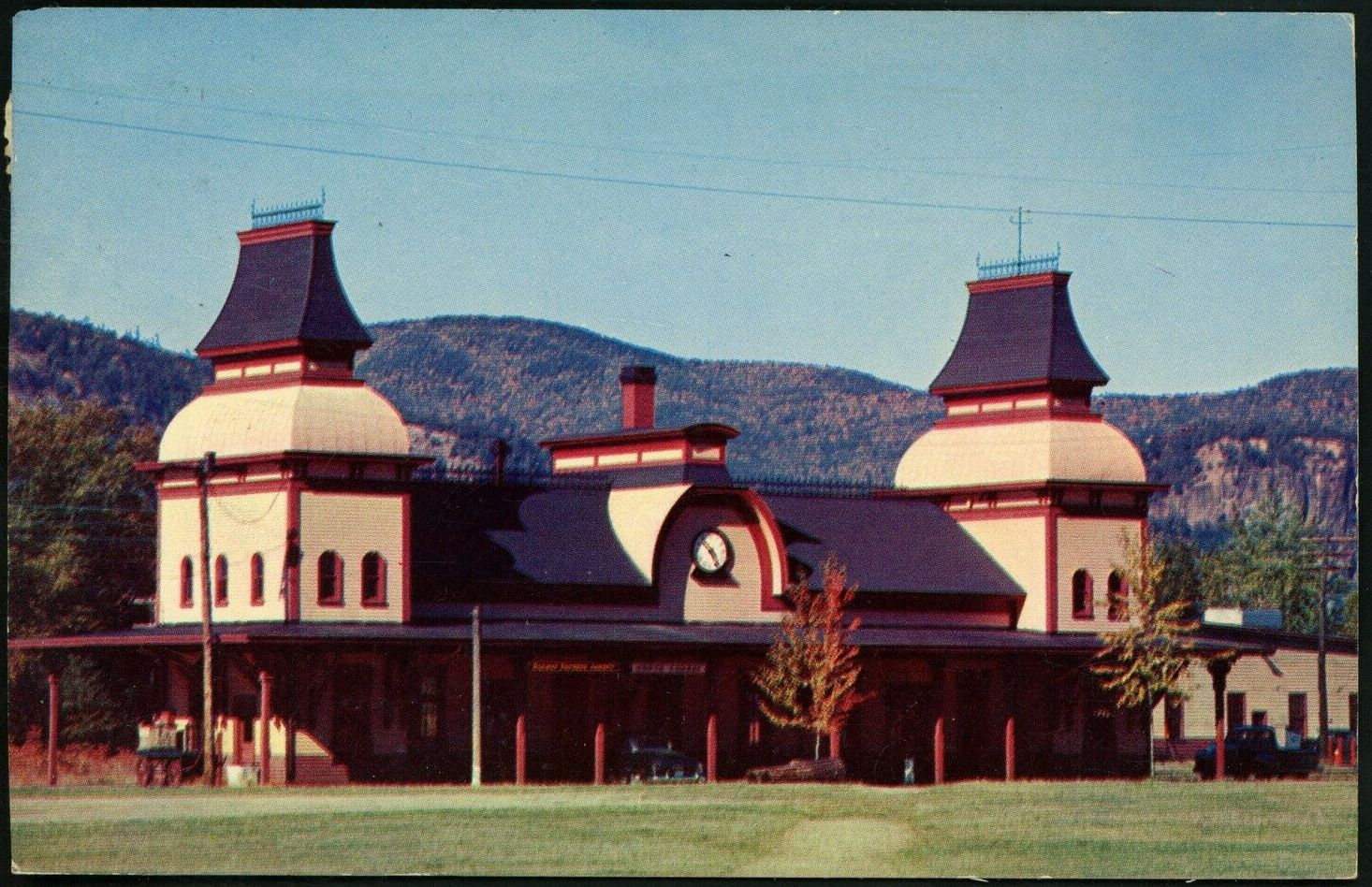
The station on a 1958 postcard

The station was built by the Portsmouth, Great Falls and Conway Railroad in 1874, two years after the Conway Branch was completed. The Portsmouth, Great Falls & Conway was absorbed by the Boston and Maine Railroad in 1890. The station served the village of North Conway for 87 years. The Conway Branch continued slightly north to Intervale just to the north, where it met the Maine Central Railroad Mountain Division. The station saw heavy use in the summer, North Conway being a popular resort destination. Beginning in 1932, downhill skiing made North Conway an increasingly popular destination, and dedicated skier trains unloaded their passengers at the depot.

In the mid-20th century, passenger rail travel declined due to competition with automobile transport. In the later years of passenger service, the Boston & Maine stopped operating traditional locomotive-and-coaches trains, and switched to Budd Rail Diesel Cars. Finally, on December 3, 1961 passenger service to North Conway was abandoned. Just over 10 years later, on 30 October 1972, freight service was also discontinued, and the station, yard, and rail line were abandoned. The station building had been reused as a firehouse and post office by 1968.

Abandonment did not last long. In 1974, three local businessmen and a host of volunteers restored the abandoned terminal and founded a new heritage railway called the Conway Scenic Railroad. More restoration work was done in 1996.

== See also ==
- National Register of Historic Places listings in Carroll County, New Hampshire
