= Canadian National Class O-18-a =

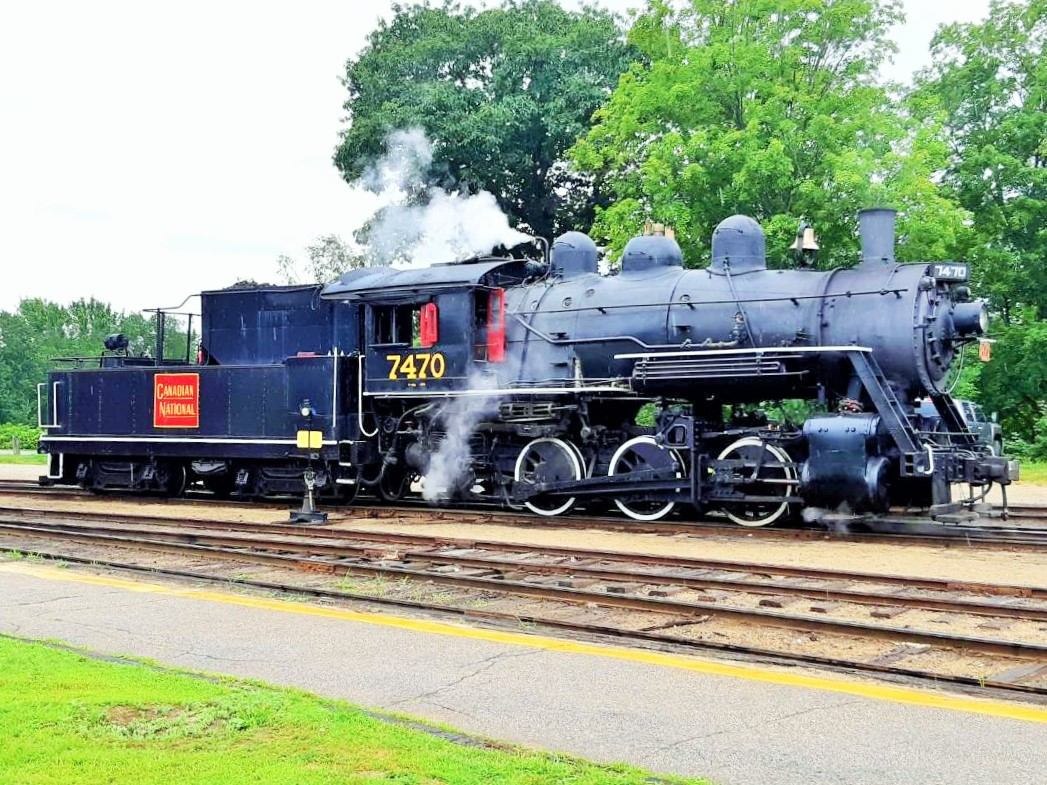
- CN No. 7470 at the Conway Scenic Railroad
Type and origin
- Power type: Steam
- Builder: Grand Trunk Railway's Point St. Charles Shops
- Build date: 1919-1921
- Total produced: 50
Specifications
- Configuration
  - Whyte: 0-6-0
  - UIC: C
- Gauge: 4 ft 8 1/2 in (1,435 mm)
- Driver dia.: 51 in (1.295 m)
- Loco weight: 174,000 lb (78.9 tonnes)
- Fuel type: Coal
- Boiler pressure: 175 lbf/in^{2} (1.21 MPa)
- Cylinders: Two, outside
- Cylinder size: 22 in × 26 in (559 mm × 660 mm)
- Valve gear: Baker
- Valve type: Piston valves
- Loco brake: Air
- Train brakes: Air
- Couplers: Knuckle
Performance figures
- Tractive effort: 36,703 lbf (163.26 kN)
Career
- Operators: Grand Trunk Railway » Canadian National Railways
- Class: GTR: F9; CN: O-18-a
- Numbers: GTR: 1749–1798, CN: 7424–7473
- Preserved: Nos. 7470 and 7456
- Scrapped: 1954–1961
- Disposition: 2 preserved, remainder scrapped

External images
- Locomotive 7456 on display at Montcalm Community College
- 7439 at work in Chatham, Ontario
- 7470, the only operable O-18a locomotive today

CN O-18-a is a class of 0-6-0 steam locomotives formerly owned by Canadian National Railways. They were switchers built by the Grand Trunk Railway's Point St. Charles Shops. Canadian National used the letter O to designate 0-6-0s.

The Grand Trunk Railway built 50 of these locomotives between 1919 and 1921 and designated them F9 Class. The GTR also had 25 more built in 1920 by the Lima Locomotive Works for use in the United States. In 1923, the Grand Trunk Railway was absorbed by the Canadian National Railways. CN classified the homebuilt locomotives O-18-a and the Lima-built F9s became GTW O-18-b class.

The O-18-a locomotives were numbered 1749–1798 by the Grand Trunk, and were renumbered as 7423–7473 by the Canadian National. They operated right up until dieselisation.

Upon retirement, 47 of the 50 locomotives were scrapped, but three were sold. CN 7439 (GTR 1764) was sold to International Harvester in 1958, but was scrapped only three years later in 1961. Canadian National 7456 (GTR 1781) and Canadian National 7470 (GTR 1795) were sold to Canada and Dominion Sugar (Chatham, Ontario) in 1959. These two survive to the present.

O-18-a number 7456 is at Montcalm Community College as a display locomotive, while number 7470 works every now and then at the Conway Scenic Railroad in North Conway, New Hampshire however since September 2022, it has been undergoing refurbishment work to its firebox. It is expected to return in the spring or summer of 2027. However, it could change.
