= Bartlett (CDP), New Hampshire =

Census-designated place in New Hampshire, United States

Bartlett, New Hampshire
- Census-designated place
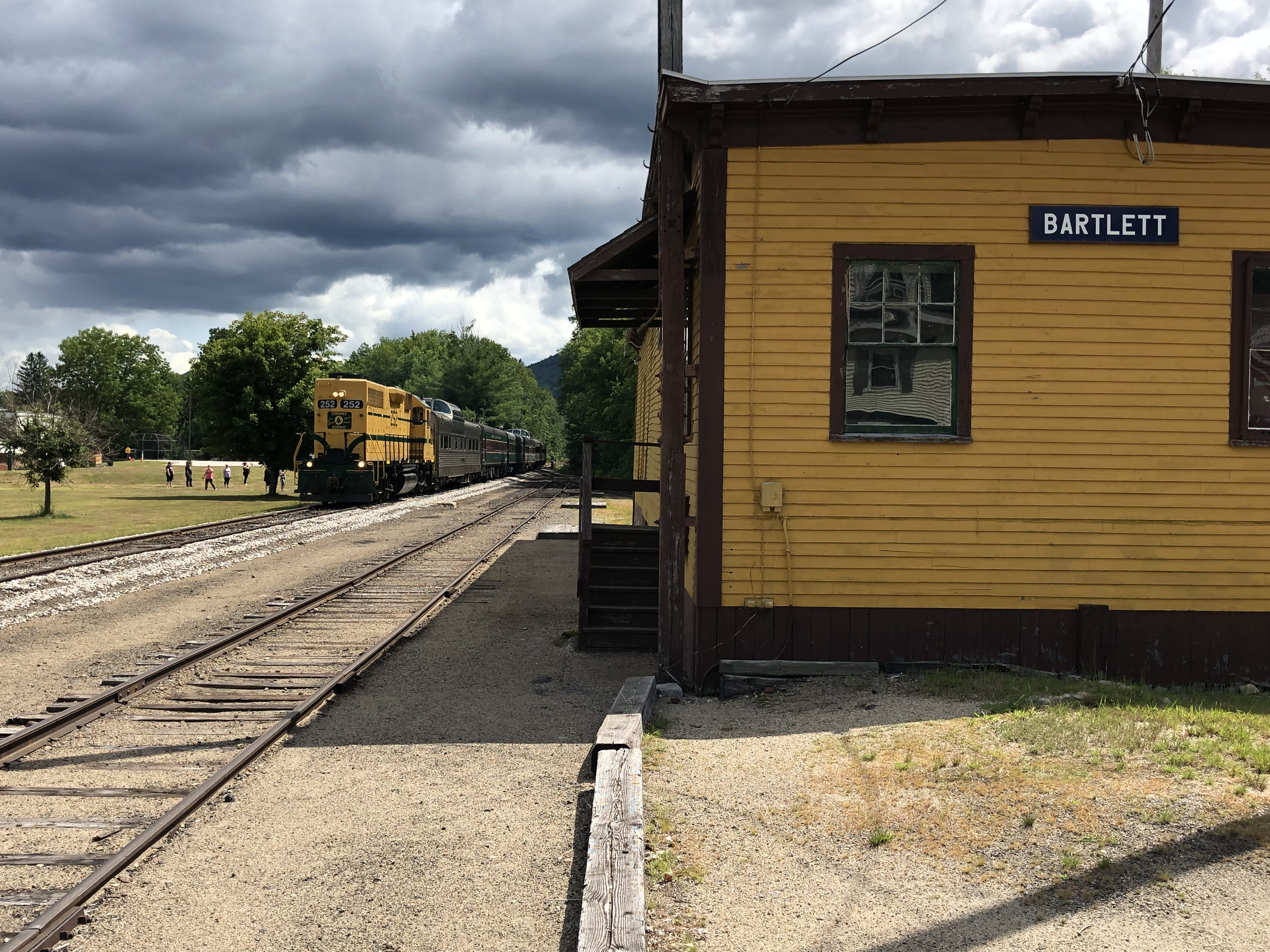
- The Notch Train of the Conway Scenic Railroad approaching Bartlett freight house, August 2019

- Location within New Hampshire Location within the United States Location within North America
- Coordinates: 44°04′24″N 71°16′56″W
- Country: United States
- State: New Hampshire
- County: Carroll
- Town: Bartlett

Area
  - Total: 1.51 sq mi (3.92 km^{2})
  - Land: 1.49 sq mi (3.85 km^{2})
  - Water: 0.023 sq mi (0.06 km^{2})
- Elevation: 692 ft (211 m)

Population (2020)
  - Total: 351
  - Density: 235.8/sq mi (91.06/km^{2})
- Time zone: UTC-5 (Eastern (EST))
  - Summer (DST): UTC-4 (EDT)
- ZIP code: 03812
- Area code: 603
- FIPS code: 33-03620
- GNIS feature ID: 2629712

Bartlett is a census-designated place (CDP) and the main village in the town of Bartlett, New Hampshire, United States. The population was 351 at the 2020 census, out of 3,200 in the entire town of Bartlett.

== Geography ==
The CDP is in the western part of the town of Bartlett, at the junction of U.S. Route 302 with Bear Notch Road. US 302 leads east and south 11 miles (18 km) to North Conway and northwest through Crawford Notch in the White Mountains 36 miles (58 km) to Littleton. Bear Notch Road leads south 9 miles (14 km) across Bear Notch to New Hampshire Route 112 (the Kancamagus Highway) in Albany.

The Bartlett CDP is bordered to the north by the Saco River, to the west by an unnamed brook east of Albany Brook, to the south by the White Mountain National Forest, and to the east by an unnamed brook that flows down the west side of Big Attitash Mountain, separating the CDP from residential development connected to the Attitash Mountain Resort.

According to the U.S. Census Bureau, the Bartlett CDP has a total area of 1.5 square miles (3.9 km^{2}), of which 0.02 square miles (0.06 km^{2}), or 1.57%, are water.

== Demographics ==
Historical population
Census	Pop.	Note	%±
2010	373		—
2020	351		−5.9%
U.S. Decennial Census

As of the census of 2010, there were 373 people, 166 households, and 95 families residing in the CDP. There were 229 housing units, of which 63, or 27.5%, were vacant. 44 of the vacant units were seasonal or vacation properties. The racial makeup of the CDP was 96.5% white, 0.5% African American, and 2.9% from two or more races. 1.1% of the population were Hispanic or Latino of any race.

Of the 166 households in the CDP, 28.9% had children under the age of 18 living with them, 40.4% were headed by married couples living together, 13.9% had a female householder with no husband present, and 42.8% were non-families. 31.3% of all households were made up of individuals, and 10.8% were someone living alone who was 65 years of age or older. The average household size was 2.25, and the average family size was 2.79.

20.6% of residents in the CDP were under the age of 18, 6.6% were from age 18 to 24, 21.6% were from 25 to 44, 36.5% were from 45 to 64, and 15.0% were 65 years of age or older. The median age was 41.5 years. For every 100 females, there were 95.3 males. For every 100 females age 18 and over, there were 89.7 males.

For the period 2011–15, the estimated median annual income for a household was $33,063, and per capita income for the CDP was $21,106.
