= Portsmouth, Great Falls and Conway Railroad =

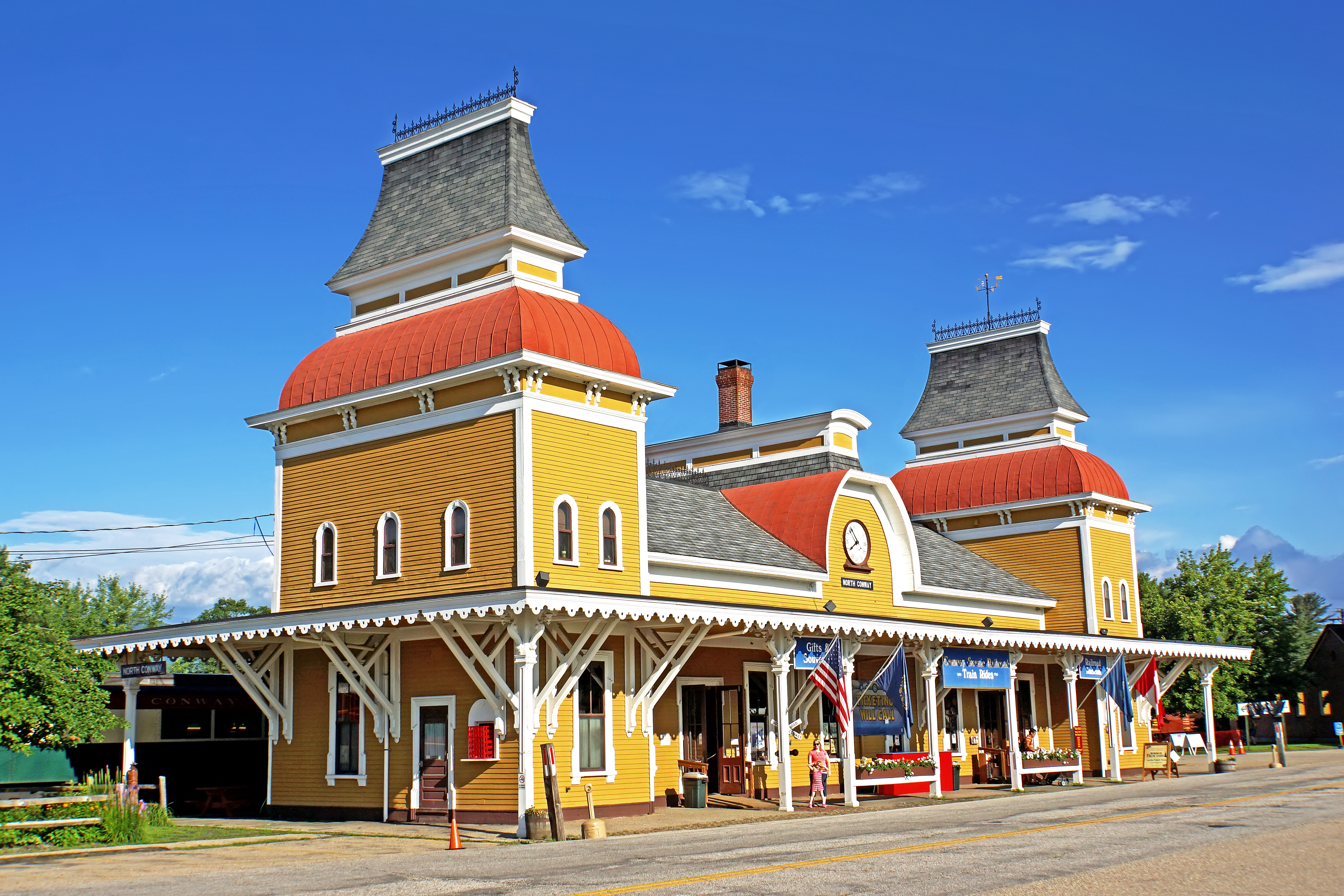
- North Conway station, built in 1874

Overview
- Locale: New Hampshire
- Dates of operation: 1871–1890
- Successor: Boston and Maine Railroad

Technical
- Track gauge: 4 ft 8 1/2 in (1,435 mm) standard gauge
- Length: 67.1 miles (108.0 km)

The Portsmouth, Great Falls and Conway Railroad (PGF&C) (later known as the Conway Branch of the Boston and Maine Railroad) is a former rail line between Rollinsford and Intervale, New Hampshire, in the United States. At Rollinsford, the line connected to other lines to provide service between the White Mountains and coastal cities such as Boston. At Intervale, it connected to the Mountain Division of the Maine Central Railroad. The rail line takes its name from the city of Portsmouth, near its southern terminus; the city of Somersworth (formerly known as "Great Falls"); and the town of Conway, near its northern terminus. Today, the infrastructure of the former PGF&C is owned by different entities, including the State of New Hampshire, the Conway Scenic Railroad, and the New Hampshire Northcoast Corporation. Some segments are still operated as freight or heritage railways, while other segments are being maintained as rail trails.

== History ==
Map

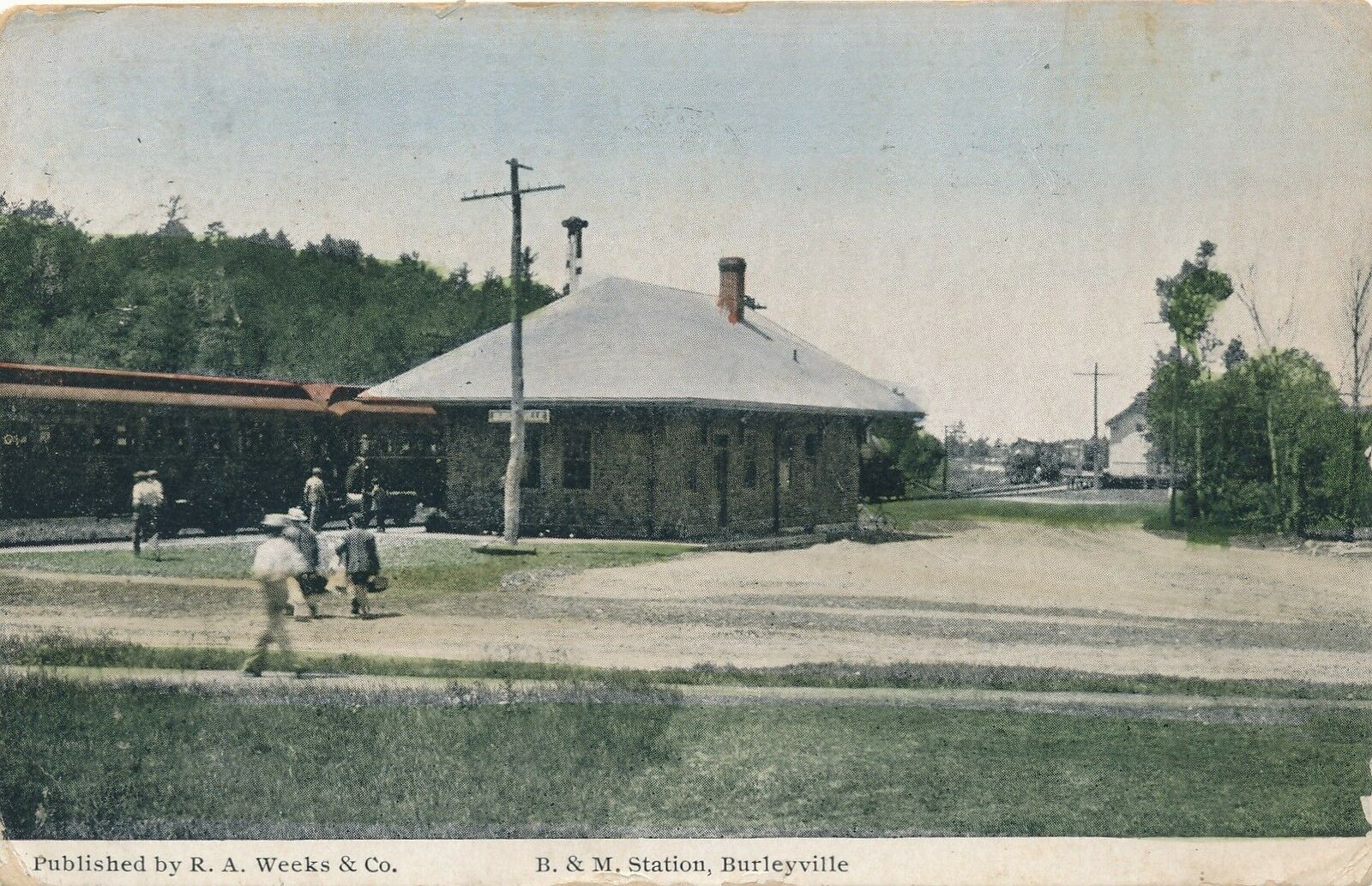
1912 postcard of Burleyville station

The PGF&C was founded as the Great Falls and Conway Railroad on June 19, 1844, as an extension of the Great Falls and South Berwick Railroad, founded in 1841 and opened in 1854. The two railways were consolidated on December 30, 1848. On February 28, 1849, the first segment from Great Falls (now Somersworth) to Rochester was opened. In 1850, it was extended to South Milton, and in 1855 it was extended to Union. Further works were delayed due to financial problems.

On June 30, 1865, the railway was re-established as the Portsmouth, Great Falls and Conway Railroad, and work on the railway resumed. In 1870, the Eastern Railroad leased the PGF&C, and on October 1, 1878, it renewed the lease for 60 years. The line continued growing after Eastern's lease. In 1871, it was extended to West Ossipee, and in 1872 it was extended to North Conway. By 1875, it was extended to Intervale, where it connected with the recently opened Portland and Ogdensburg Railway. Finally, on May 9, 1890, the Portsmouth, Great Falls & Conway was absorbed into the Boston & Maine, which operated it as its Conway Branch.

Abandonment came in two phases, with the first taking place in 1941. This closed the original route from Somersworth to Jewett station in South Berwick, Maine, where it had joined the Eastern Route (formerly the Eastern Railroad) to reach Portsmouth. The current section between Rollinsford and Somersworth was originally a branch built by the B&M to reach the mills in Great Falls.

The second abandonment came in 1972 when the section from Mt. Whittier (West Ossipee) to Intervale was abandoned after the last train departed North Conway, on October 31, 1972. (The last train to depart Intervale was about a week before when the B&M picked up equipment dropped off by the MEC for the soon-to-be Conway Scenic Railroad.) The Conway Scenic Railroad purchased the line within the town of Conway two years later, and began operating on August 4, 1974. The Boston and Maine retained ownership of the line, including the abandoned portion, which was sold off in sections, with the final section (the Route 28 overpasses in Ossipee to the Madison town line) being sold to the state in 2001; this also included the small section in Albany, New Hampshire. The section from Mt. Whittier south to the NHN property line (the Route 28 overpasses) was officially abandoned in the mid-1990s.

=== Current status ===
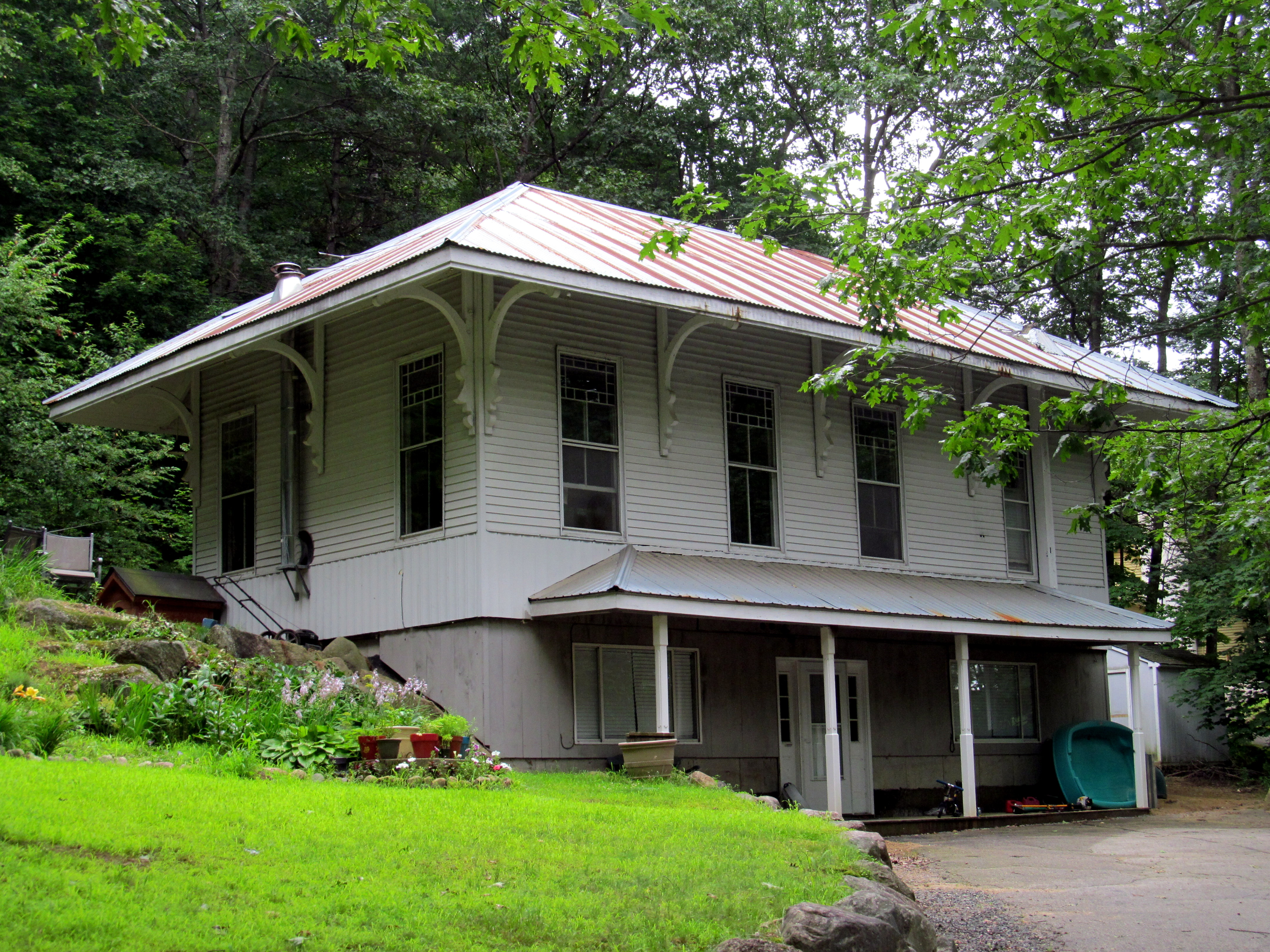
The former Intervale station, now converted to a private residence

The northernmost 7 miles (11 km) of the rail line between Conway and the Mountain Division in Intervale are owned by the Conway Scenic Railroad. This heritage railway operates seasonal passenger trains on this and also on a portion of the Mountain Division. The Conway Scenic Railroad allows the use of its portion of the Conway Branch by snowmobilers outside of its operating season.

In 1986, the New Hampshire Northcoast Railroad (NHN) purchased the line between Rochester and Ossipee, and began operating the line as a freight railway. The section south of Rochester to the terminus in Rollinsford, just outside Dover, was sold to the NHN in 1994, ending Boston & Maine operation of the Conway Branch. NHN mostly uses the tracks to carry quarried sand to its parent company Boston Sand & Gravel in Boston.

In 2001, the 21-mile (34 km) section between New Hampshire Route 28 in Ossipee and West Main Street in Conway was purchased by the state of New Hampshire, and the New Hampshire Division of Parks and Recreation now maintains this section as the Conway Branch Recreational Rail Trail. The railroad in this section is abandoned, and roads are paved over the rails, but much of the rails are still in place, as there is no trail surface. This rail trail is used by hikers and snowmobilers. The Cotton Valley Rail Trail Club uses about 8 miles (13 km) of the track in the Ossipee area for recreational use of speeders, between Route 28 and Route 16.

In 2007, the Silver Lake Railroad began operating small, seasonal tourist trains along 3 miles (5 km) of track in Madison, using large speeders. As of 2017, the Silver Lake Railroad has ended its operations.

As of September 2025, the Silver Lake Railroad has been reopened as Silver Lake Railriders providing daily railbike tours over the same 3 miles of track through the Chain of Ponds (seasonally May through October).
