= Bartlett Roundhouse =

- U.S. National Register of Historic Places
- NH State Register of Historic Places
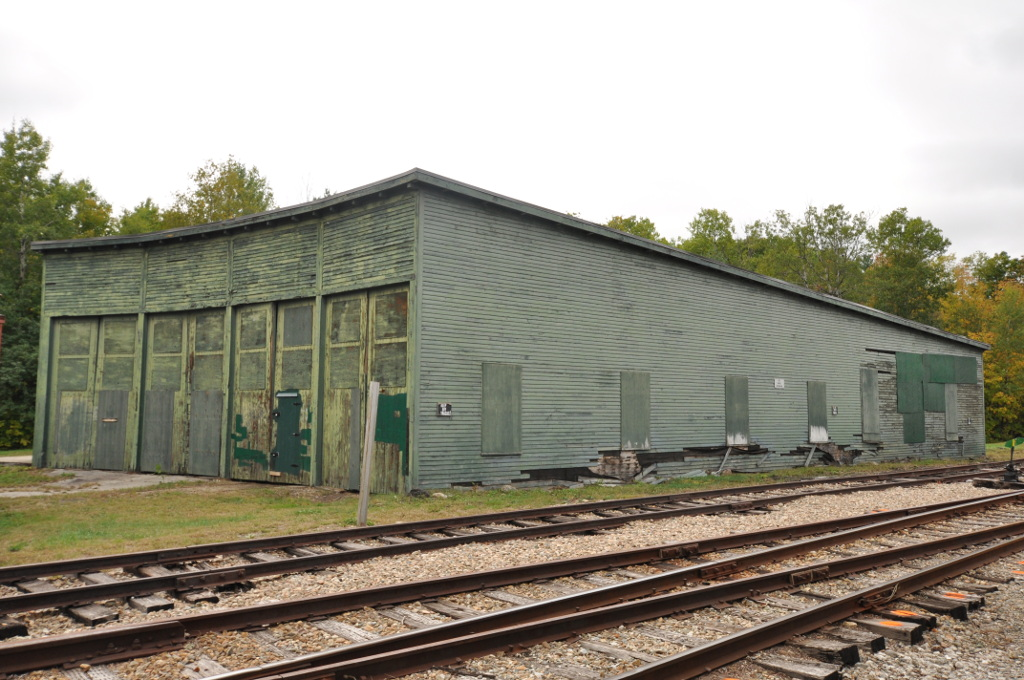

- Location within New Hampshire Location within the United States
- Location: S. of US 302, Bartlett, New Hampshire
- Coordinates: 44°4′36″N 71°17′15″W
- Area: less than one acre
- Built: 1887
- Architectural style: Railroad Turntable; Roundhouse
- NRHP reference No.: 15000664

Significant dates
- Added to NRHP: September 29, 2015
- Designated NHSRHP: July 28, 2008

The Bartlett Roundhouse, also known as the Bartlett Engine House, is a historic railroad service facility in Bartlett, New Hampshire. Located just south of United States Route 302 and east of Pine Street, it consists of a multibay service building and the remains of a 56-foot (17 m) railroad turntable which provide access to the service bays. Built in 1887–88, it is a reminder of the historic importance of the railroad in the local economy. The site was listed on the National Register of Historic Places in 2015, and the New Hampshire State Register of Historic Places in 2008.

== Description and history ==
The Bartlett Roundhouse stands on the west side of Bartlett village, a short way east of the crossing of United States Route 302 and the railroad tracks of the Maine Central Railroad. It is a tall single-story wood-frame structure, in an arched configuration with four service bay entrances on the east side. Its exterior is finished in wooden clapboards and it is covered by a flat roof. The area in front of the service bays contains the foundational remnants of a railroad turntable.

The roundhouse was built in 1887–88 by the Portland and Ogdensburg Railway, as a service point for extra steam locomotives needed to power trains up the steep grades of Crawford Notch. The Portland and Ogdensburg was acquired by lease in 1888 by the Maine Central Railroad. The facility was used by the Maine Central, and was taken out of service after regular passenger service was ended on the line in 1958. Two bays were lengthened in 1913 to accommodate larger engines, and two other bays were demolished about 1950, as usage of the facility declined. It was then sold to the state, which used it as a sand and storage shed until the 1980s. It is now undergoing restoration by a local non-profit organization.

== See also ==
- National Register of Historic Places listings in Carroll County, New Hampshire
