= Saco Valley Railroad =

Overview
- Locale: Carroll County, New Hampshire
- Dates of operation: 1892–1898

Technical
- Track gauge: 4 ft 8 1/2 in (1,435 mm) standard gauge
- Length: 6.5 miles (10.5 km)

The Saco Valley Railroad was a short-lived logging railroad that followed the Dry River in New Hampshire. The short line extended northward from a junction with the Mountain Division. The slope is a steep one and the railroad had to stay very near, or even between the banks of the Dry River on wooden trestlework. Washouts were a regular occurrence. The Saco Valley Railroad only ran for six years before the area was logged out. Without maintenance, all trace of the line was washed away by 1907.

The railway had only one locomotive, a Shay locomotive, well suited to steep grades and low-quality tracks. Locomotive #1 was built by Lima Locomotive Works in March 1892 as their builders number 390. The locomotive was shipped to Wisconsin after the Saco Valley Railroad was dismantled, and worked on several logging railroads in Bayfield, Park Falls, Washburn, and Cusson, Minnesota.
