= Diana's Baths =

Waterfalls in New Hampshire, United States

Coordinates: 44°4′16″N 71°10′14″W

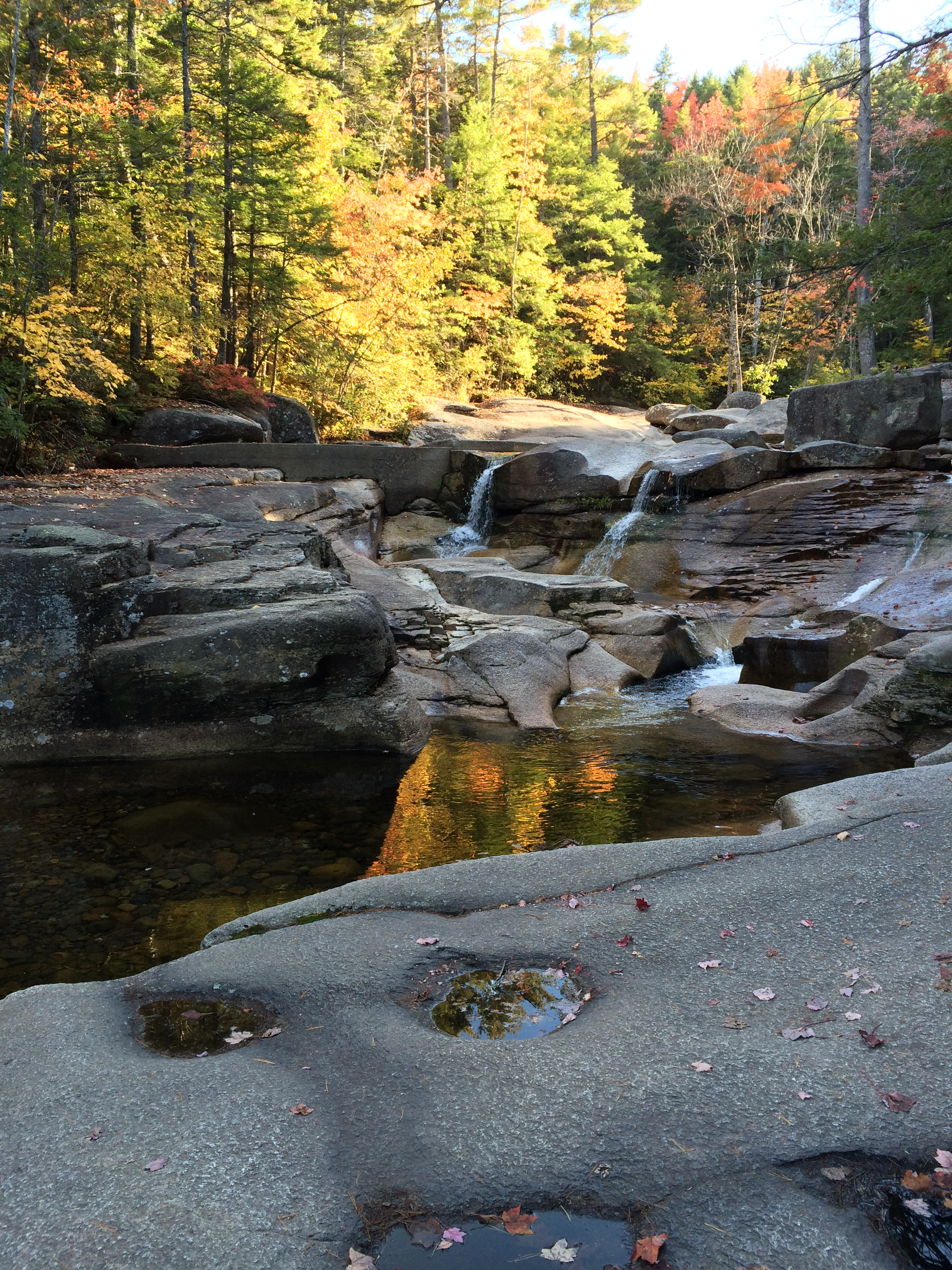
Diana's Baths in the fall

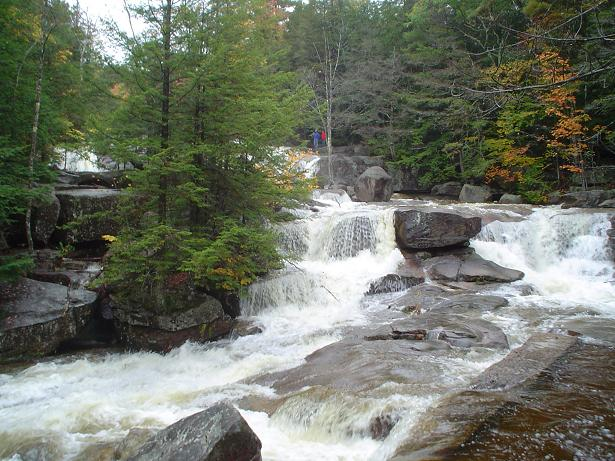
Diana's Baths, Bartlett, NH

Diana's Baths is a series of small waterfalls located in the southeastern corner of the town of Bartlett, New Hampshire, near the village of North Conway in the White Mountains of New Hampshire, United States. This historic site is within the White Mountain National Forest. The stream that flows into this waterfall is called Lucy Brook. The waterfalls were once the location of an old sawmill operation in the 1800s. After the sawmill was abandoned by the Lucy family in the 1940s, it was turned into a historic site that would be protected by the U.S. Forest Service. The total drop of the waterfalls is 75 feet (23 m), and the hike to the base of the waterfall is about 0.6 miles (1.0 km). Diana's Baths is now a popular family destination.

The intensity of the stream is related to the season; the stream flow is most intense in the springtime because of runoff from the winter snowmelt. Insect repellent is an essential from spring to fall.

== History ==
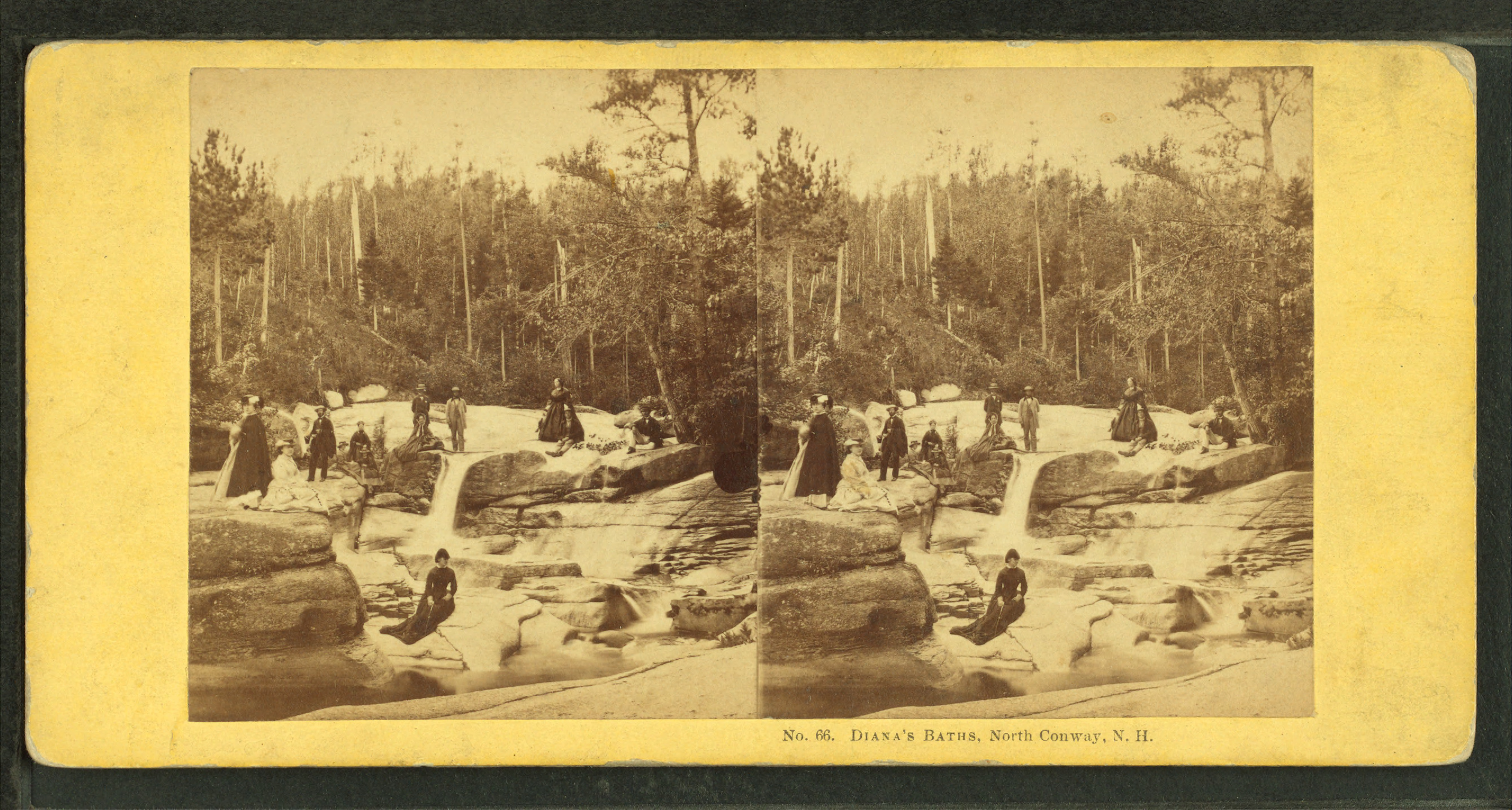
Diana's Baths, stereoscopic, photograph by John P. Soule (1827–1904)

In 1863, George Lucy bought five acres (2.0 ha) of land on the site of Diana's Baths. The Lucy family had built a sawmill in the middle of the cascading waterfalls. During the year 1890, the owner George Lucy began to notice that his property was attracting tourists. In response to this new flow of tourists he built a boarding house that was three stories tall. His business was not as successful as he thought it would be, because of the other major hotels in the surrounding area. In the 1930s the family moved from having a sawmill to having a concrete dam with turbines. The family abandoned the site when the invention of portable mills was introduced and they could now use it when they moved from timber harvest site to the next. Mrs. Hattie C. Lucy owned the property and operated a gift shop beside the falls through the 1940s with an ice house behind the store to cool the soda that was sold to tourists. Mrs. Lucy and her son David lived in the home through the late 1950s until she sold the house. Mr. DeSimone purchased the home and remaining land and eventually sold it to the government. This is when the land became National Forest land and the remaining buildings were torn down.

== Location ==
Diana's Baths are located off West Side Road 0.5 miles (0.80 km) north of the turn to Cathedral Ledge outside of North Conway. The short and mild hike to the base of the waterfall is about 0.6 miles (0.97 km) from the head of the trail. Past Diana's Baths, the Moat Mountain Trail continues to the summit of North Moat Mountain.

== Origin of name ==
According to Place Names of the White Mountains by Robert and Mary Julyan, the origin of the name comes from this:

"These curious circular stone cavities on Lucy Brook originally were known as the Home of the Water Fairies; tradition says evil water sprites inhabited the ledges, tormenting the Sokokis Indians until a mountain god answered the Indians' prayers and swept the sprites away in a flood. But sometime before 1859 a Miss Hubbard of Boston, a guest at the old Mount Washington House in North Conway, rechristened them Diana's Baths, presumably to evoke images of the Roman nature goddess. The pools are also called Lucy's Baths."

The name was official when the government purchased the land in the 1960s and made it part of the White Mountain National Forest.

== Role of the Forest Service ==
In 2005, the U.S. Forest Service conducted an environmental assessment to determine the effect humans have on this preserved land. The impact on the ecosystem was a large amount of waste and human excrement in the area surrounding Lucy Brook. Forest rangers decided to add toilets and trash receptacles to combat these problems, and since then, little to no adverse effect on the environment has been detected.

== See also ==
- List of waterfalls
