= Canadian National 7470 =

Preserved CN O-18-a class locomotive

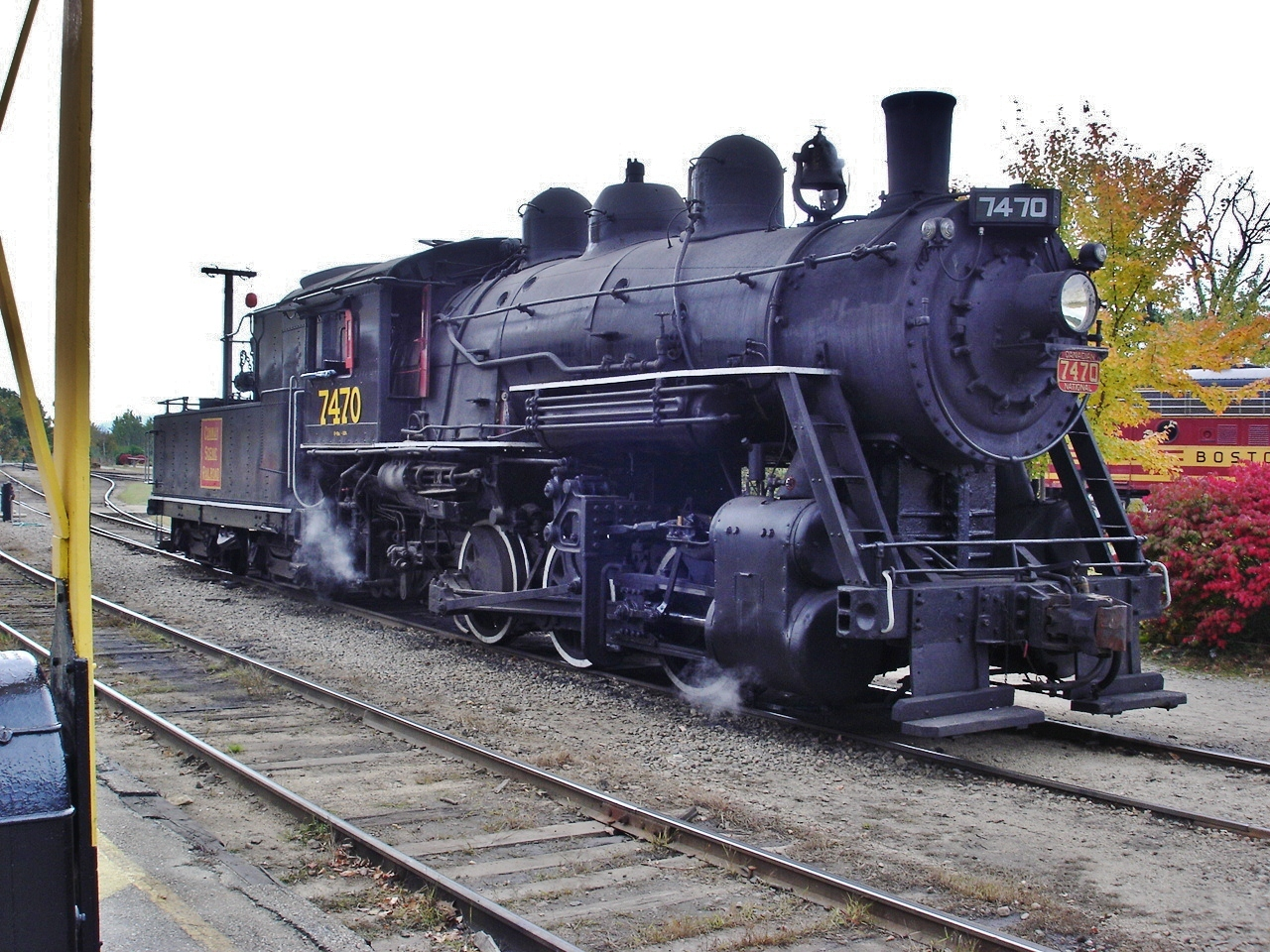
- No. 7470 sitting idle at the Conway Scenic Railroad on October 3, 2006
Type and origin
- Power type: Steam
- Builder: Grand Trunk Railway
- Serial number: 22/1500
- Model: O-18-a
- Build date: April 1921
- Rebuild date: September 1955
Specifications
- Configuration
  - Whyte: 0-6-0
- Gauge: 1,435 mm (4 ft 8 1/2 in) standard gauge
- Driver dia.: 51 inches (130 cm)
- Loco weight: 87 tons (79 t)
- Tender weight: 65 tons (59 t)
- Total weight: 152 tons (138 t)
- Fuel type: Coal
- Fuel capacity: 11 long tons (11 t)
- Water cap.: 66,000 imp gal (300,000 L; 79,000 US gal)
- Boiler pressure: 175 pounds-force per square inch (1.21 MPa)
- Cylinders: Two, outside
- Cylinder size: 22 in × 26 in (559 mm × 660 mm)
- Valve gear: Baker
- Valve type: Piston valves
- Loco brake: Air
- Train brakes: Air
- Couplers: Knuckle
Performance figures
- Tractive effort: 36,700 lbf (163.25 kN)
Career
- Operators: Grand Trunk Railway; Canadian National Railway; Canada Dominion Sugar; Conway Scenic Railroad
- Class: New: F9; Now: 0-18-a
- Numbers: GTR 1795; CN 7470; CDS 303; CSRX 47; CSRX 7470
- Official name: Dwight Smith
- Locale: North Conway, New Hampshire
- Retired: May 1963
- Restored: August 3, 1974
- Current owner: Conway Scenic Railroad
- Disposition: Operational

Canadian National 7470 is a preserved O-18-a class 0-6-0 "Switcher" type steam locomotive, built in 1921 by the Grand Trunk Railway (GT), it is preserved and operated by the Conway Scenic Railroad (CSRX) in North Conway, New Hampshire.

== History ==
=== Revenue service ===
The locomotive was built by the Grand Trunk Railway (GT) at Pointe-Saint-Charles, Montreal, Quebec, in April 1921. The Grand Trunk classified the switcher as an F9 class and numbered it as No. 1795. In 1923, the Canadian National Railway (CN) absorbed the Grand Trunk, they reclassified it as an O-18-a and renumbered it as No. 7470. The engine worked throughout many different railyards in Southern Ontario for twenty-four years switching and moving various equipment.

In 1945, it was later assigned in Toronto, Windsor, Lindsay and Midland, Ontario where it continued working as a yard switcher for a number of years. No. 7470 received an overhaul in September 1955 and was placed in standby service until 1959, when it was replaced by diesels. It was placed in storage on a sidetrack along with several other O-18-a classes awaiting to be scrapped.

On September 16, 1959, it was sold to the Canada Dominion Sugar (CDS), where it was rebuilt and spent some additional years as a switcher, it was also renumbered as No. 303. It continued service with CDS until May 1963, when it was retired and purchased by the Ontario government for a transportation museum that never came to fruition.

In 1965, it was sold to a man named Charles Weber, who had the engine placed in storage in Wallaceburg, Ontario, for several years untouched. It was later purchased by a rail collector named Fred Stock, the engine was again put into storage at the Canadian National rail yard in Sarnia. In April 1968, Stock sold the engine to Dwight Smith.

=== Excursion service ===
Smith was working on founding the Conway Scenic Railroad (CSRX), which opened in 1974. After purchasing the engine, it was moved to Rigby Yard in South Portland, Maine, in October 1968. In 1971 after sitting in Portland for three years, it was moved by diesel to its new home in North Conway, New Hampshire, upon arrival, it went through a three-year restoration to return it to operating condition for excursion service.

Subsequently, the locomotive returned to active service on August 3, 1974, and was renumbered as No. 47, it hauled its first excursion train on August 4. The engine was renumbered back to No. 7470 and the Canadian National paint scheme were restored in 1989, according to Railfan & Railroad magazine.

No. 7470 would haul excursion trains for the railroad for twenty-eight years until 2002, when it was taken out of service to undergo its mandated Federal Railroad Administration (FRA) 1,472-day inspection and overhaul. It returned to service in August 2006.

No. 7470 has also pulled the Notch Train on rare occasions for special events, once each in 2007 and 2011, and twice in 2019.

In July 2014, it was announced that the locomotive was going to be coming out of service to undergo another major mandated FRA 15-year overhaul. The engine ran its last train on January 3, 2015, and its overhaul work began the following day. It returned to active service on June 1, 2019, and made its first test runs. The locomotive made its excursion return on June 29.

On August 6, No. 7470 was given its official name in honor after Conway Scenic Railroad's founder, Dwight Smith.

On January 2, 2021, No. 7470 operated during the first annual Winter Steam event after the Massachusetts Bay Railroad Enthusiasts canceled their traditional Steam in the Snow event due to the COVID-19 protocols, the excursion ran from North Conway to Sawyers River in Hart's Location, New Hampshire and return.

The locomotive was scheduled to run for the Steam in the Snow excursion on January 2 and followed by a Lerro Productions photo charter on January 8 and 9 of 2022, but both events were cancelled due to the engine being sidelined from service after an inspection by the FRA discovered that the locomotive's springs as well as fractures in the tender trucks were worn out. It returned to service on June 10, 2022.

== Accident ==
On the morning of January 3, 2022 at 4:44 am, a radio inside 7470's cab caught fire, and it caused the inside of the locomotive's cab to burn up as well. The fire also damaged the spring in the whistle valve, causing the whistle to release a valve sound, which alerted the nearby steam locomotive mechanic, who called 9-1-1. The nearby fire department arrived shortly afterward to put the fire out. Had it not been for the whistle valve blowing itself, the 1874-built roundhouse it was stored in would have received critical fire damage and collapsed onto 7470. The cab has since been repaired and the engine returned to service in June 2022.

== Appearances in media ==
In 1972, the engine made its first ever film appearance in the Paramount Pictures film, A Separate Peace, lettered as Boston & Maine 47.
