= Sandcastle Waterpark =

Water park in West Homestead, Pennsylvania

- Interactive map of Sandcastle Waterpark
- Slogan: "The best of the shore right next door!"
- Location: West Homestead, Pennsylvania, United States
- Coordinates: 40.398°N 79.928°W
- Owner: Herschend
- Opened: 1989; 37 years ago
- Water slides: 11 water slides
- Website: Official website

Sandcastle Waterpark is a water park located in the Pittsburgh suburb of West Homestead. It opened in 1989, and is located on a 67-acre (270,000 m^{2}) piece of land along the banks of the Monongahela River.

The park contains sixteen water slides, several swimming pools, and a handful of other attractions. It is owned by Herschend.

== History ==
The site that the park occupies was formerly a railroad yard for U.S. Steel. In 1988, Kennywood Entertainment Company bought the land and began construction on the park. Sandcastle Waterpark officially opened to the public in July 1989. In 2007, the park was sold to Parques Reunidos. In early 2025, the park was sold once again to Herschend.

== Current attractions ==
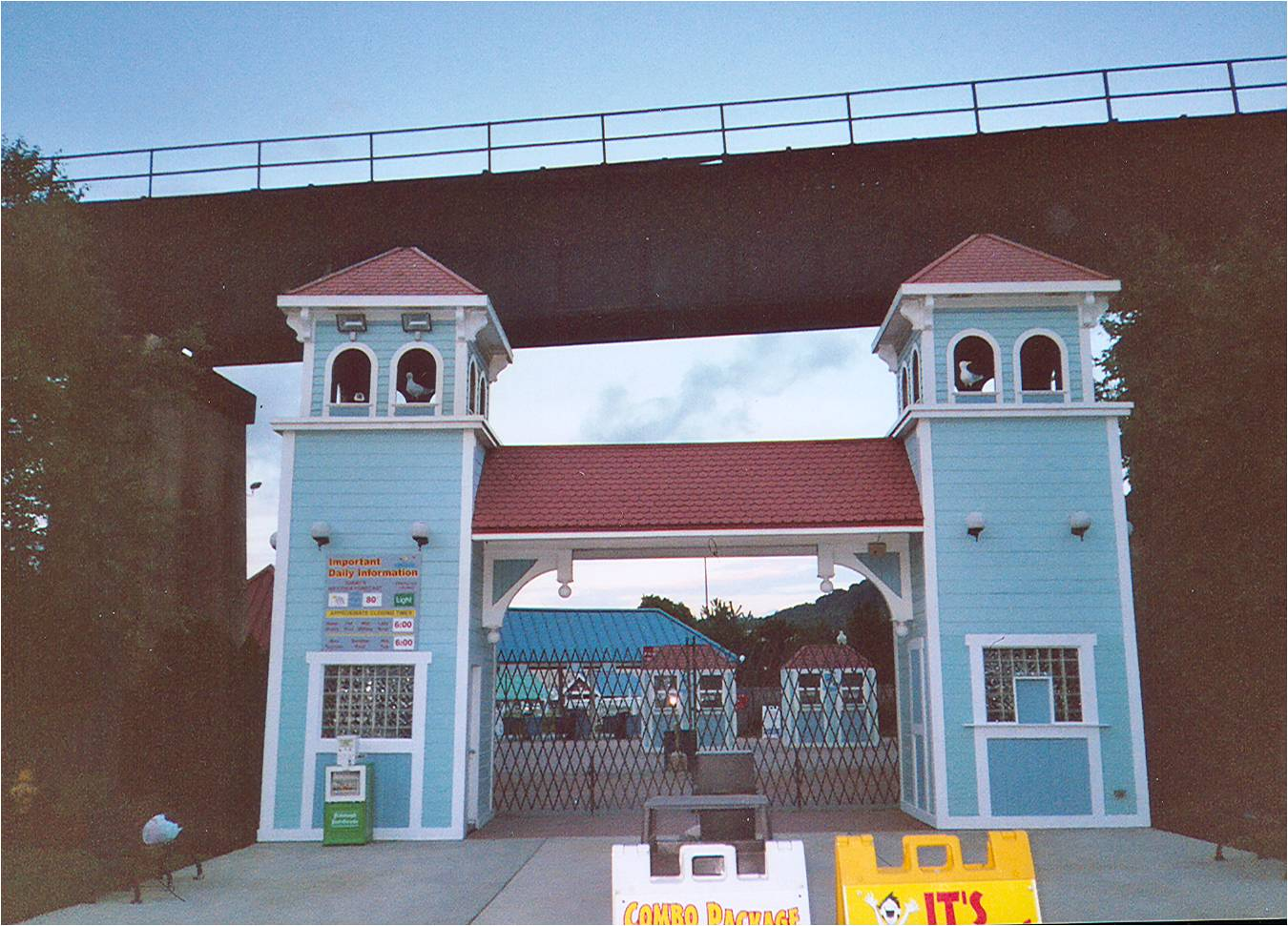
The entrance to the park in 2005

The park has a total of 11 water slides. This includes five speed slides: Blue Tubaluba, Thunder Run, Tubers Towers, Cliffhangers, and Dragon's Den. It also includes three body slides: Lightning Express, Bombs Away, and Boardwalk Blasters. Other attractions at Sandcastle include a lazy river, the Mon-Tsunami wave pool, and several designated areas of water slides and water attractions designed specifically for children called Wet Willie's Waterworks, Mushroom Pool, and Tad Pool. A children's sandbox also exists on the premises.

== Former attractions ==
The only water slide to have been removed was a body slide known as Bermuda Triangle. It was replaced by Blue Tubaluba in 2002, which utilizes the same tower and queue structure that Bermuda Triangle previously did.

The park previously offered a miniature golf course, a go-kart track and volleyball courts. These were replaced by Mon Tsunami in 1999, and Dragon's Den in 2010, respectively. The sand pit left over from the volleyball courts was repurposed into a sandbox for children.
