= Rannoch Corp. =

Rannoch Corporation
- Industry: Research and Development of Radar Technology
- Defunct: July 2008
- Fate: Acquired by SRA International
- Successor: ERA Corporation
- Headquarters: Alexandria, Virginia, United States
- Products: AirScene Airport Management system

Rannoch Corporation, was an American company based in Alexandria, Virginia. It was a research, development and production company working in the field of radar tracking for airport management, ground and airspace control and air defence.

Its products included the 'AirScene' Airport Management systems.

They had offices worldwide and competed in this market with companies such as: ERA (Czech Republic); Sensis Corporation (USA); Park Air Systems AS (Norway); HITT (Netherlands); Lochard (Australia) and Thales (France).

In October 2006 Rannoch acquired ERA (6,25 million Euro was provided by an investment company for the acquisition) and moved large part of development and manufacturing to Pardubice, Czech Republic, location of ERA. In February 2007 Rannoch renamed itself to Era Corporation. In July 2008 ERA was bought by American SRA International for 125.5 million US dollars.

== AirScene ==
The primary mission of their AirScene System is to track all types of aircraft in the air and on an airport surface and transponder-equipped vehicles to provide a high fidelity, high accuracy, and high update rate air/surface surveillance display. The system receives and decodes signals transmitted by Mode A/C, Mode S and ADS-B transponders. The system can be configured so that the sensors are connected to a central processor in real-time, for up-to-the-second track information. Each signal is directly communicated to the central processor where the aircraft/vehicle(s) is/are identified and its/their position calculated in real time (nominally once per second).

The remote sensors are designed to be small and compact for easy sitting and installation. Both the GPS and L-Band antenna are light and extremely service-friendly allowing them to be installed virtually anywhere and in any environmental condition.
