= Mountain Division =

Former railroad line owned and operated by the Maine Central Railroad

Mountain Division (Maine Central Railroad)
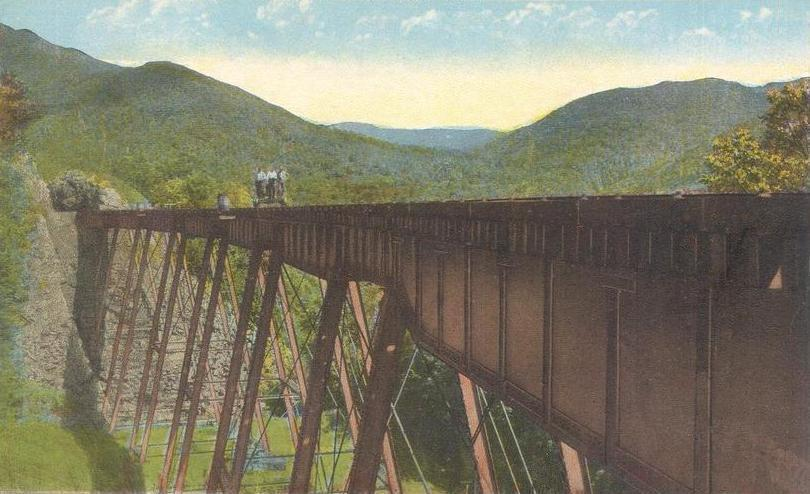
- Frankenstein Trestle in the White Mountains

Overview
- Locale: Portland, Maine to St. Johnsbury, Vermont

Technical
- Track gauge: 4 ft 8 1/2 in (1,435 mm) standard gauge

The Mountain Division (later the Mountain Subdivision) is a railroad line that was once owned and operated by the Maine Central Railroad (MEC). It stretches from Portland, Maine on the Atlantic Ocean, through the Western Maine Mountains and White Mountains of New Hampshire, ending at St. Johnsbury, Vermont in the Northeast Kingdom. The line was abandoned in 1983 by MEC's successor, Guilford Transportation Industries (GTI) (now CSX Corporation). Guilford retained a stub between Portland and Westbrook. A section in New Hampshire remains in use by heritage railway Conway Scenic Railroad.

== History ==
Built as the Portland & Ogdensburg Railroad before acquisition by the Maine Central Railroad (MEC), the line initially provided transportation for summer visitors to grand Victorian hotels, including the Bay of Naples Inn in Naples (reached by connection with Sebago Lake steamboats), the Crawford House in Crawford Notch and the Mount Washington Hotel in Bretton Woods. Cool, clean air at Sebago Lake and the White Mountains provided a refreshing escape from the heat, humidity and smoke of 19th-century cities. Autumn foliage and winter skiing extended the tourist season. The Flying Yankee train-set operated as the Mountaineer from Boston to Crawford Notch via Intervale Junction during World War II, but passenger service had been reduced to a single daily round-trip between Portland and St. Johnsbury by the 1930s. The train between Portland and St. Johnsbury usually consisted of a RPO-express car, a baggage car and a single coach after the 1920s; and substitution of a stainless steel combination for the coach and baggage car reduced the train to two cars for the last several years before the end of passenger service in 1958.

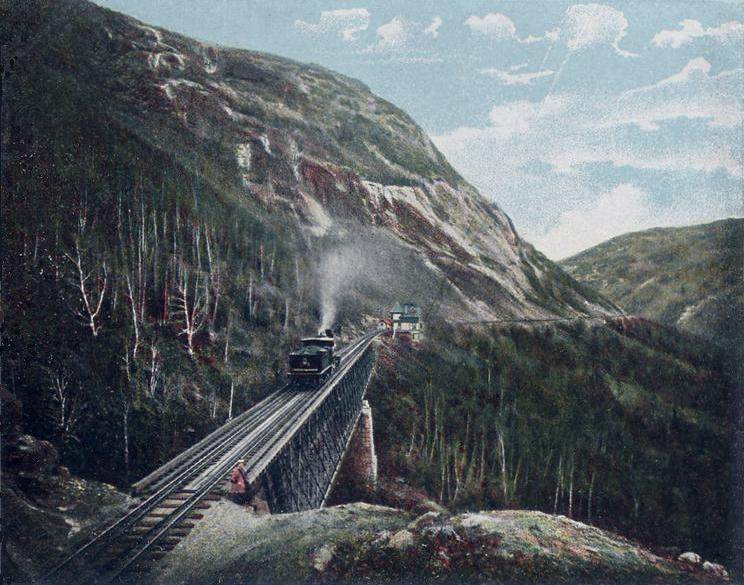
Crossing the Willey Brook Bridge towards Crawford Notch in 1906

The Mountain Division was the shortest route from Portland to points west of Chicago. It saw relatively heavy through freight traffic from termination of the joint operating agreement with the Boston & Maine Railroad (B&M) in 1953 until abandonment in 1983, when GTI favored a B&M routing. The westbound grade was 2.2% for 18.5 miles (29.8 km) from Bemis (Notchland) to the summit at Crawford Notch. MEC operated 2-6-6-2 Mallet locomotives #1201-1204 on the Mountain Division from 1911 through the 1920s. The Mallets had been built for the B&M's Hoosac Tunnel in 1910 and were sold to MEC when Hoosac Tunnel was electrified the following year. The Mallets were built to burn oil, but were converted to burn coal after local fire departments had difficulty extinguishing oil fires. Two large firemen were required to hand-fire the coal-burning Mallets westbound. One Mallet was stationed in Portland, another at Lancaster on the Beecher Falls Branch, and a third at the Bartlett helper wye, while the fourth Mallet was undergoing maintenance.

USRA Light Mikados (Maine Central class S) handled freight trains on the Mountain Division after the last Mallet was retired in 1931, and class O 4-6-0s handled local trains and (often in tandem) provided helper service. EMD F3s and GP7s replaced steam locomotives in 1953. Four or five diesel locomotives were typical head-end power for diesel-era freight trains; and a pair of EMD SW7s or non-dynamic-braked GP7s often provided helper service westbound. First-generation diesels were replaced by similar numbers of EMD GP38s, ten GE U18Bs and two ALCO RS-11s. Helpers were less common with these second-generation diesels.

== Legacy ==
Heritage operator Conway Scenic Railroad operates summer and fall excursion trains on the portion of the Mountain Division between North Conway through Crawford Notch to Fabyan.

The rail line from Westbrook to the Maine–New Hampshire border has been abandoned since a 2011 plan to restore it failed. In July 2023, MaineDOT applied to the STB to remove the unused tracks.

MEC's parent company, Pan Am Railways, retained ownership of the section of the line to Westbrook, which it operates as the "Mountain Branch." What remains of the Mountain Branch is now owned by CSX Corporation.

== Route mileposts ==
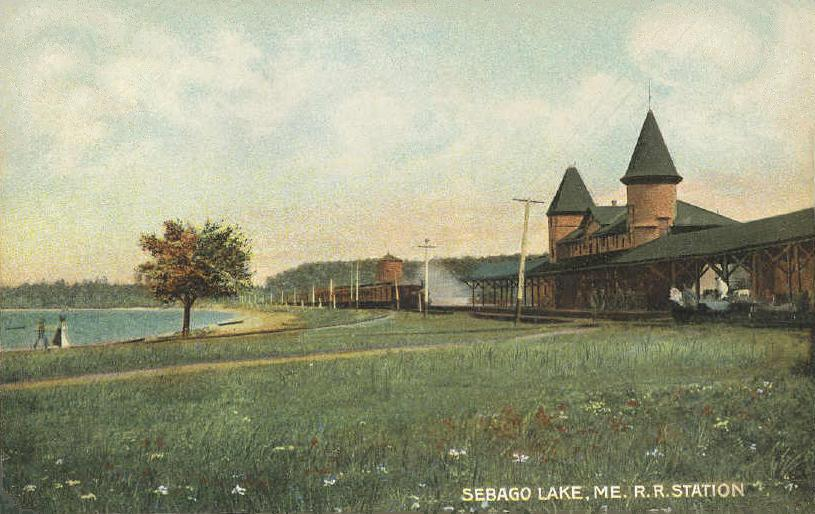
Sebago Lake Station in 1907, Standish

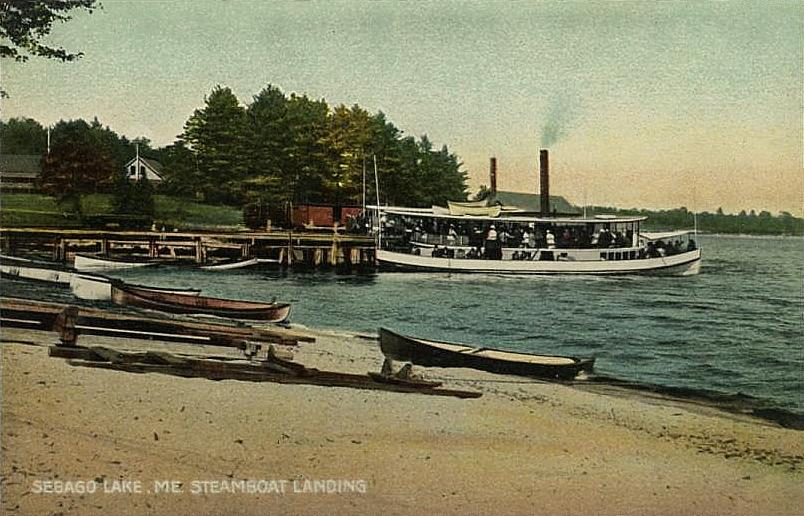
Steamboat landing at Sebago Lake Station in 1907 (note transfer of freight from boxcar to left of steamboat)

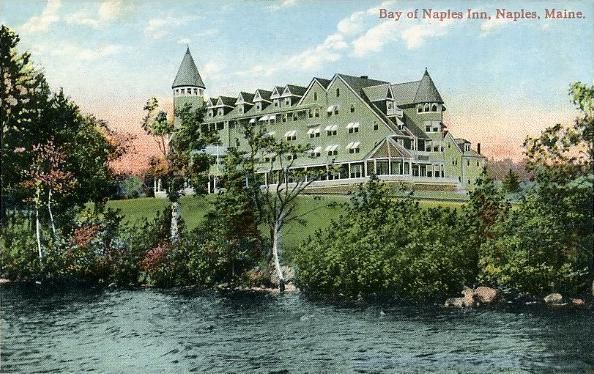
The Bay of Naples Inn in 1913, Naples

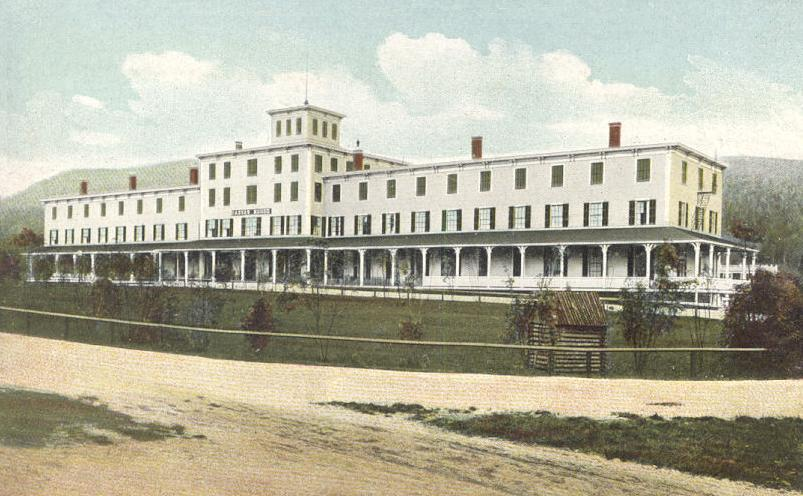
The Fabyan House in 1908, Bretton Woods

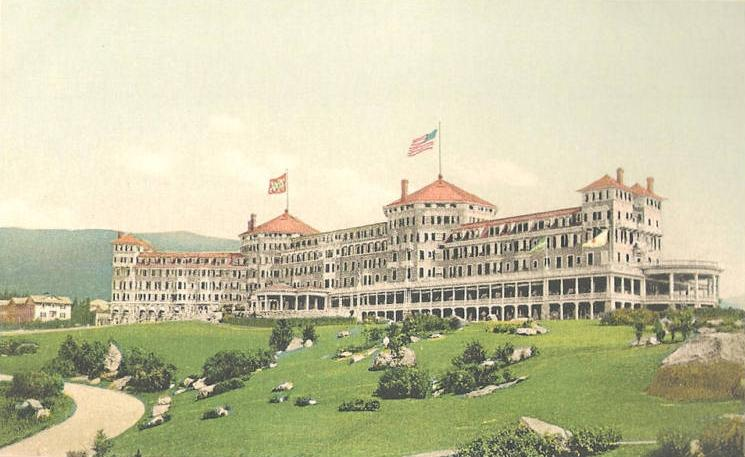
The Mount Washington Hotel c. 1910, Bretton Woods

- Milepost 0: Portland interchange with B&M and Grand Trunk Railway; operated by Portland Terminal Company.
- Milepost 5.4: Cumberland Mills S. D. Warren Paper Mill and junction with the Boston & Maine Railroad's Worcester, Nashua & Portland Division; operated by the Portland Terminal Company. Agent's station closed 1983.
- Milepost 10.8: South Windham agent's station closed 1981.
- Milepost 12: Newhall company town for the Oriental Powder Company. Gunpowder mill closed in 1905 and agent's station closed 1932.
- Milepost 13.6: White Rock agent's station closed 1921.
- Milepost 16.7: Sebago Lake Station connection with Sebago Lake steamboats. Queen Anne style agent's station built 1890 and closed 1935. Turntable and 2-stall enginehouse built in 1890.
- Milepost 24.6: Steep Falls privately built depot with dance hall upstairs dismantled 1961.
- Milepost 26.4: Mattock's agent's station closed 1933.
- Milepost 31.7: Cornish agent's station closed 1962.
- Milepost 33.4: West Baldwin agent's station closed 1930.
- Milepost 36.3: Bridgton Junction interchange with narrow-gauge Bridgton & Saco River Railroad. Agent's station closed 1930.
- Milepost 36.8: Hiram agent's station closed 1949.
- Milepost 43.3: Brownfield agent's station closed 1935.
- Milepost 49.8: Fryeburg agent's station closed 1971.
- Milepost 54.3: Conway Center, New Hampshire agent's station closed 1933.
- Milepost 56.9: Redstone large granite quarry. Agent's station closed 1935.
- Milepost 59.3: North Conway agent's station closed 1952.
- Milepost 61.4: Intervale Junction with B&M to Rochester, New Hampshire. Agent's station closed 1958.
- Milepost 64.8: Glen agent's station closed 1950.
- Milepost 70.5: Bartlett helper terminal for the westbound grade up through Crawford Notch. Agent's station closed 1962, then reopened 1981-1984.
- Milepost 74.8: Sawyer's River junction with Sawyer River Railroad. Agent's station closed 1921.
- Milepost 76.6: Bemis flag stop renamed Notchland in 1931.
- Milepost 78.2: Carrigain junction with Saco Valley Railroad. Agent's station closed 1898.
- Milepost 79.5: Frankenstein Trestle
- Milepost 80.8: Willey House section foreman's house.
- Milepost 83.5: Mount Willard section foreman's house.
- Milepost 85: Crawford Notch agent's station closed 1955 and sold to Appalachian Mountain Club.
- Milepost 88.3: Fabyan, junction with the Boston & Maine Railroad and spur to the Mount Washington Cog Railway at Marshfield Station. Agent's station closed 1958.
- Milepost 93.6: Twin Mountain
- Milepost 99.5: Quebec Junction with Maine Central Quebec Division (later Beecher Falls branch) to Lime Ridge, Quebec
- Milepost 103.6: Whitefield junction with B&M to Berlin.
- Milepost 106.8: Scott, New Hampshire, junction with B&M to Groveton. Agent's station closed 1931.
- Milepost 109.1: Lunenburg, Vermont agent's station closed 1924.
- Milepost 111.5: Gilman paper mill agent's station closed 1983.
- Milepost 113.5: Mayo agent's station closed 1932.
- Milepost 116.4: Miles Pond agent's station closed 1921.
- Milepost 119.7: Essex agent's station closed 1932.
- Milepost 123.5: Concord agent's station closed 1949.
- Milepost 127.2: Griswold agent's station closed 1932.
- Milepost 131.4: St. Johnsbury interchange with B&M (became Canadian Pacific Railway in 1926) and St. Johnsbury & Lamoille County Railroad

== Beecher Falls Branch ==
The Dominion Lime Company built a railroad in 1887 from the Quebec Central Railway at Dudswell Junction to Lime Ridge, Quebec. In 1888, the Upper Coos Railroad built a railroad north to the Quebec border from the Grand Trunk Railway at North Stratford, New Hampshire. In 1889, William Bullock Ives' Hereford Railway purchased the Dominion Lime Company railroad and extended it south to connect with the Upper Coos Railroad. MEC leased the Upper Coos Railroad and the Hereford Railway in 1890 and built a connecting Coos Valley Railroad in 1891 from North Stratford to the Mountain Division at Quebec Junction. This line was operated as the MEC Quebec Division until Maine Central terminated lease of the Hereford Railway in 1925. Canadian Pacific Railway (CP) later operated over some of the line through Quebec. The Upper Coos Railroad and Coos Valley Railroad were purchased by MEC in 1931 and operated as the Beecher Falls branch of the Mountain Division. The former Coos Valley Railroad was dismantled in 1948 when MEC negotiated trackage rights over the B&M to Groveton, New Hampshire and over the former Grand Trunk Berlin Subdivision from Groveton to North Stratford. The remaining line north of North Stratford operated as the North Stratford Railroad after 1976.

=== Route ===
- Milepost 99.5: Quebec Junction
- Milepost 101.9: Waumbek Junction with B&M to Berlin, New Hampshire
- Milepost 104.4: Jefferson station closed 1921.
- Milepost 111.4: Lancaster, New Hampshire station closed 1933
- Milepost 112.5: Coos Junction with B&M to Groveton, New Hampshire (joint station closed 1932).
- Milepost 124.1: Maidstone, Vermont
- Milepost 126.9: Mason's diamond crossing Grand Trunk Railway
- Milepost 132.0: North Stratford, New Hampshire junction with Grand Trunk Railway
- Milepost 144.8: Colebrook, New Hampshire station closed 1974.
- Milepost 152.8: West Stewartstown, New Hampshire station closed 1956.
- Milepost 154.5: Beecher Falls, Vermont station closed 1974.
- Milepost 183.6: Sawyerville, Quebec
- Milepost 190.3: Cookshire Junction with CP
- Milepost 203.3: Dudswell Junction with Quebec Central Railway
- Milepost 207.6: Lime Ridge

== Notes ==
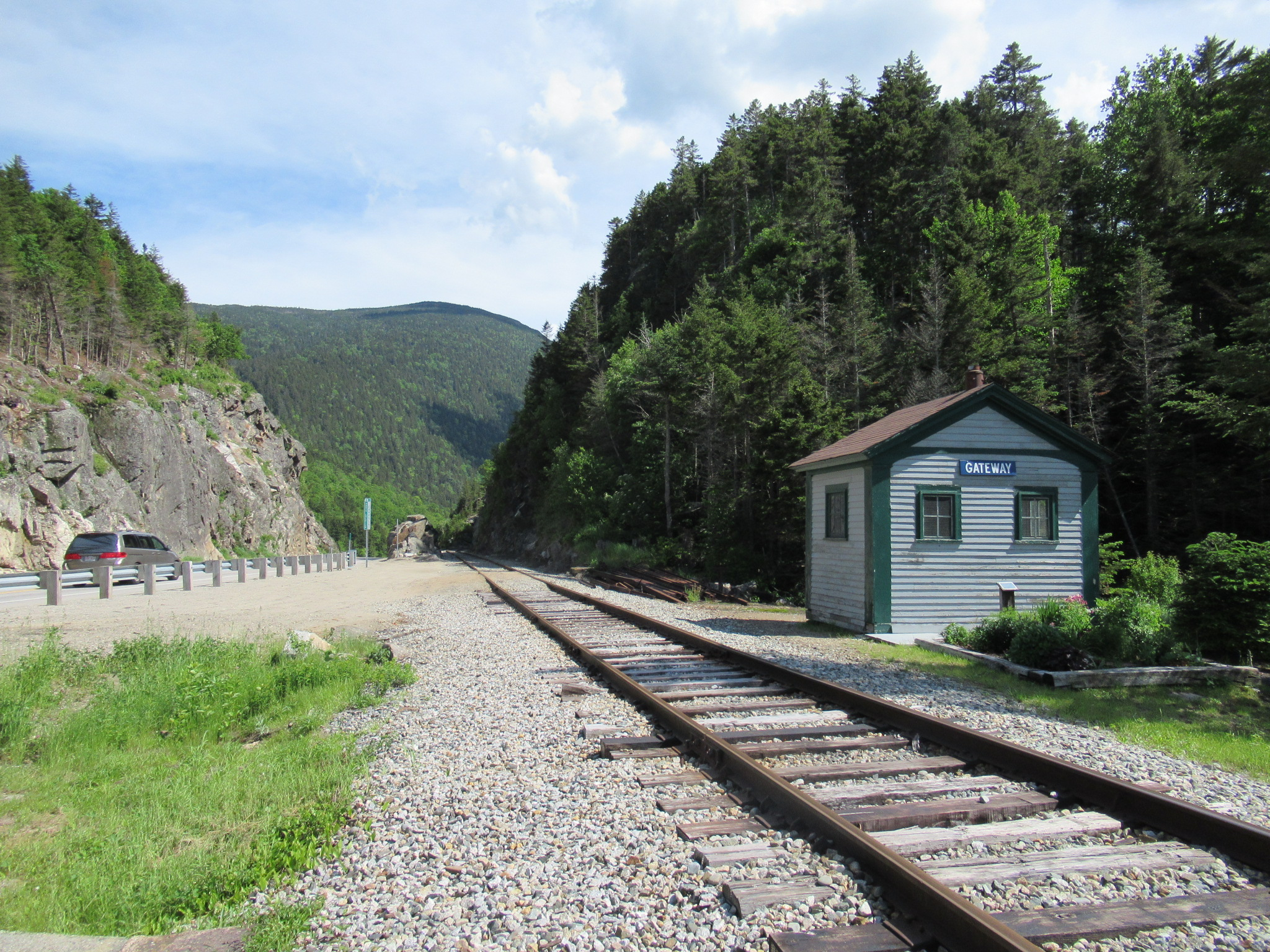
Entering the Gateway of Crawford Notch, June 2019
