= Story Land =

Theme park in Glen, New Hampshire, United States

- Previously known as Story Town (1954)
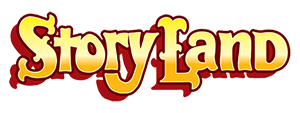

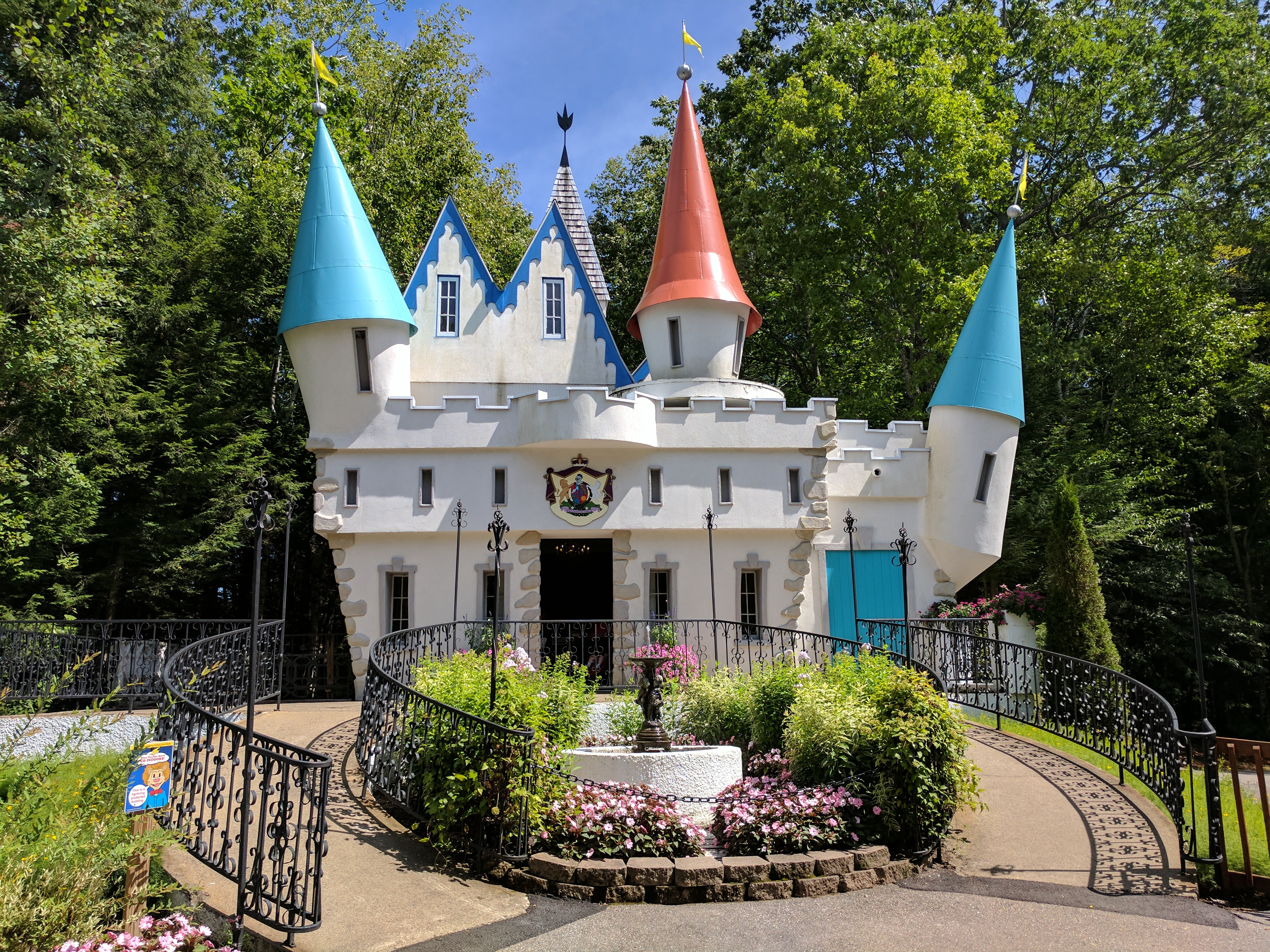
- Interactive map of Story Land
- Location: Glen, New Hampshire, U.S.
- Coordinates: 44°06′58″N 71°10′58″W
- Opened: 1954 (72 years ago)
- Owner: Herschend
- General manager: Chris Kearsing
- Slogan: "Where Fantasy Lives"
- Area: 35 acres (14 ha)

Attractions
- Total: 30
- Roller coasters: 2
- Water rides: 2
- Website: www.storylandnh.com

Story Land is a fairy tale theme park in Glen, New Hampshire. Opened in 1954, the 35-acre (14 ha) park is meant to appeal to children up to the pre-teen ages.

== History ==
In the early 1950s, Bob and Ruth Morrell purchased a large number of dolls from Germany based on storybook characters. They hired local artist and art teacher Arlene "Topsy" Samuelson to design a theme park, including buildings and attractions, around the dolls.

Opened in 1954 as Story Town, it had just one ride: an old fire truck called "Freddie the Fire Engine". It was renamed Story Land after its first year because the name was too similar to Storytown USA in Upstate New York.

At the time of its 50th anniversary, the park spanned some 35 acres (14 ha) and had 20 rides. Ten years later, a new wooden roller coaster, Roar-O-Saurus, was opened.

It was operated by the family's Morrell Corporation through 2007. Stoney Morrell, son of the original owners, had died, and the park was sold to the Kennywood Entertainment Company. Kennywood itself was purchased by Parques Reunidos the following year, and placed under the Spanish company's American division, Palace Entertainment.

In 2019, the park began hosting "Nostalgia Nights," an event for guests 21 years old and up who are encouraged to re-create childhood memories and photos in the park after hours. Two Nostalgia Nights were held in 2019, and have continued since.

In 2025, both Story Land and the adjacent Living Shores Aquarium, along with Water Country—an unrelated water park in Portsmouth, New Hampshire—were sold by Palace Entertainment to Herschend.

== Related operations ==
=== Heritage New Hampshire ===
Heritage New Hampshire in 2006

Heritage New Hampshire, an attraction owned by the Morrell family and dedicated to New Hampshire history, was located next to Story Land for 30 years, opening on July 3, 1976, and closing on October 22, 2006.

Heritage New Hampshire was an interactive museum that featured several actors that would play the role of a person who shaped New Hampshire's history. There was the captain of a tall ship from England, a woodsman, a newspaper printer, Mathew Brady (famous Civil War photographer), an engineer of a steam train through Crawford Notch, and others. The museum also included an exhibit where guests could ride a Segway, whose manufacturer was based in Bedford.

The Morrell family often hired British university graduates as actors under the auspices of the British Universities North America Club (BUNAC) "Work America" work exchange program for the summer season; this was a reciprocal arrangement which allowed American graduates to work in the UK during their vacations. The family was known for their hospitality; their foreign employees often appeared in the Story Land yearbooks.

As guests would move in between sections of the museum, they would see some video footage, some animatronics, and some exhibits. There was a gift shop at the end of the museum tours.

After the closure of Heritage New Hampshire, the building was used for storage by Story Land for a decade, and was then repurposed as Living Shores Aquarium.

=== Living Shores Aquarium ===
Alterations on the building that had been Heritage New Hampshire started in the fall of 2017. In early 2018, it was announced that the facility was being repurposed to house an indoor public aquarium that would operate year-round. Living Shores Aquarium opened in late 2019. As of early 2025, the aquarium is listed online as being open year-round, operating daily during July and August, and usually four days a week during other months.

=== Linderhof Motor Inn ===
Linderhof Motor Inn began operating in Glen in 1967. During this era, Swiss-chalet style condos and motels were widely built throughout the Glen area. The largest Linderhof units were built just north of Story Land and were originally owned by couples Larry and Barbara LaReau and Jim and Kathy Sheehan. They owned the buildings for nearly 30 years, until they were bought by the Morrell family around 2000 and adopted into Morrell Family Attractions. The Morrell-owned Linderhofs consisted of three main buildings: reception and breakfast (the largest building), laundry and amenities (the smallest building), and the guest room building. The buildings are now used as lodging for the park's overseas traveling hosts.

== Rides and attractions ==
A complete lists of Story Land rides can be found at their website.

The park has multiple themed music soundtracks that play in specific areas of the grounds. These tracks are exclusive to the park, and most of the music was created by local composer Sharyn Ekbergh in the early 1990s.

=== Current ===
- Alice's Tea Cups
- Cinderella's Pumpkin Coach
- Pirate ship Buccaneer
- Antique German Carousel
- Bamboo Chutes
- Polar Coaster
- Great Balloon Chase
- Dr. Geysers Remarkable Raft Ride
- Flying Fish
- Antique Cars
- Swan Boats
- Henrietta's Eggs-traordinary Farm Tractors
- Cuckoo Clockenspiel
- Dutch Flying Shoes
- Splash Battle Pharaoh's Reign
- RapTour Safari
- Huff Puff & Whistle Railroad
- Crazy Barn (returned 2026)
- Turtle Twirl (returned 2026)
- Moo Lagoon Water Area

==== Huff Puff and Whistle Railroad ====
This ride is a 20 in (508 mm) narrow-gauge ridable miniature railroad that serves as an attraction and shuttle service through the park. The trains are run in three sets of six cars in the colors red, green and blue, pulled by Chance Rides C.P. Huntington locomotives, numbered #2, #4, #18, and #47. #2 normally pulls the red trainset, #4 the blue trainset, #47 the green trainset, and #18 is used as needed to give the other engines a break. Since returning from a multi year rehab, #18 has seen nearly constant use spelling the other engines as they receive service.

==== Roar-O-Saurus ====
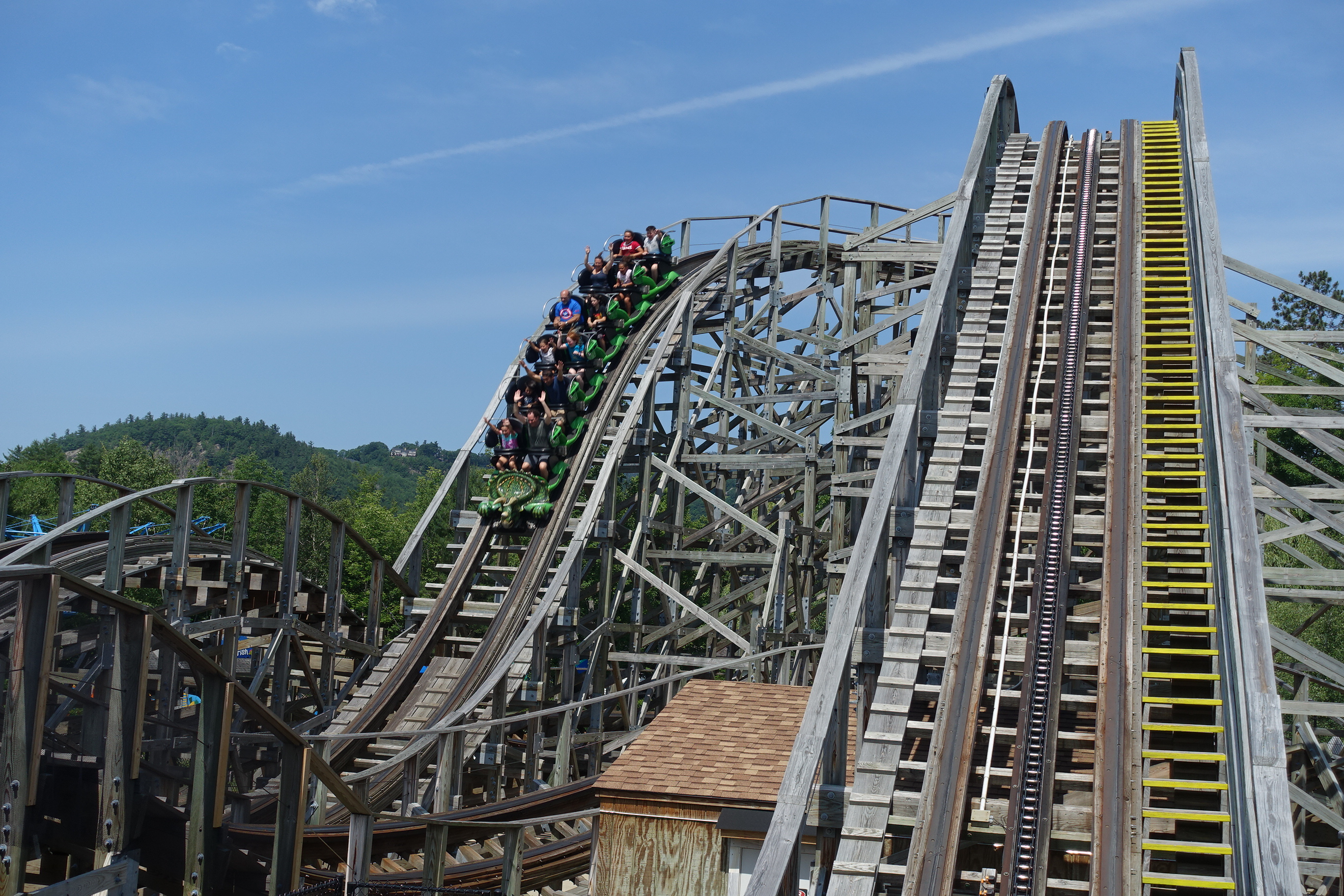
Roar-O-Saurus's lift hill and first drop, with the coaster's Triceratops-themed train going down the latter

This ride is a wooden roller coaster designed and built by American wooden coaster design firm The Gravity Group. Themed to a triceratops, the ride features a 40-foot-tall (12 m) chain lift hill with a 38-foot (12 m) drop, and a top speed of 33 mph (53 km/h). It was announced at the IAAPA Exposition in November 2013. The park announced that the ride would feature custom-designed trains to match the ride's location in the park's Dinosaur themed section. The park announced that the ride would open in May 2014, in time for the park's 60th anniversary. It was also revealed that the storyline behind the name Roar-O-Saurus is that the train represents Rory, a triceratops who learns to roar over the course of the ride. The ride opened on May 24, 2014, the park's opening day for the season. The lead car is themed to Rory, the triceratops which the ride is themed to. Designed around Story Land's terrain, the ride features a 40-foot-tall (12 m) chain lift hill with a 38-foot (12 m) drop, and a top speed of 33 mph (53 km/h), with a total track length of 1,240 feet (380 m). (Note: The data on the track length varies according to the sources used.) There are twelve points of air time over the course of the ride. The ride also features an artificial tunnel, in which one of the air time moments is located. Roar-O-Saurus was praised by enthusiasts for providing a thrilling experience while remaining accessible to Story Land's target audience, children twelve and under. The ride was compared to Wooden Warrior at Quassy Amusement Park, another family wooden coaster in New England manufactured by The Gravity Group. The ride was featured by CNN on a list of "The most insane new U.S. roller coasters" with journalist Pam Grout describing how despite not being big or bad, the ride is "pretty extreme" for catching air despite its small size. According to Dave Lipnicky of the American Coaster Enthusiasts, the ride's small scale makes it less intimidating to kids, while still packing a "wild punch".

=== Former ===
- Whirling Whales (removed 2016)
- Story Land Queen (removed 2018)
- Los Bravos Silver Mine Tours (closed 2019)
- Slipshod Safari Tour (re-themed as RapTour Safari in 2019)
- Oceans of Fun Sprayground (removed 2023)
- King Neptune's Crab Crawl (a themed Bob's Space Racers ramped water game)(removed 2023)

==== Voyage To The Moon ====
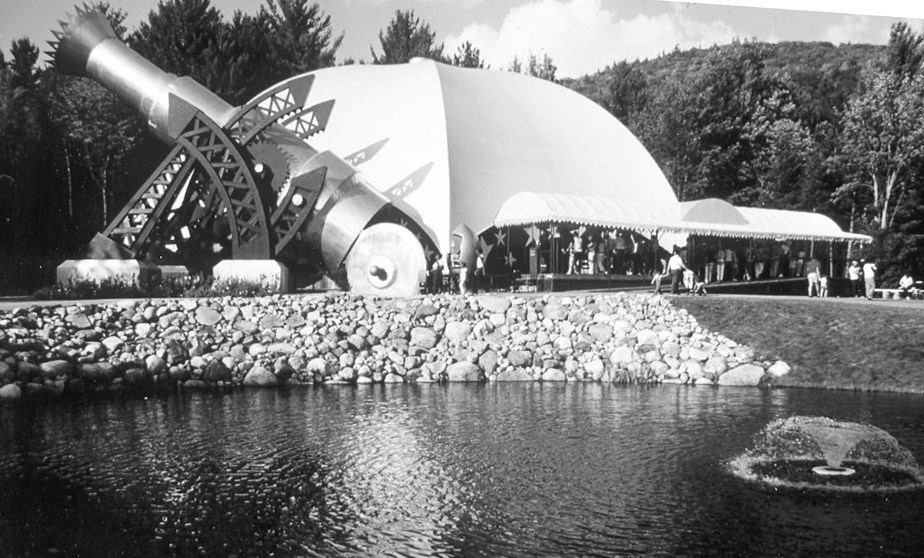
Voyage To The Moon in 1983

After a year of study and preparation, Story Land announced in 1981 that it would add a new, original, state-of-the-art dark ride. It would be housed in a fabric-covered dome 50 feet (15 m) tall and 124 feet (38 m) wide. Bob Morrell had seen a similar structure in a Florida cow field and was determined to add one to the park. The interior of the white fabric roof was painted black, and two of the creative collaborators on Heritage New Hampshire, artisans Peter Stone and David Norton, were hired to create the storyline and scenes inside. The dome took shape in 1981. The skeletal steel of the huge cannon was ready in winter 1982. "Space Fantasy", later renamed "Voyage To The Moon", officially opened in June 1983 after nearly three years of engineering and construction. Governor John Sununu shared the first five-minute voyage with Bob Morrell, riding in one of the bullet-shaped cars built by Bradley and Kaye of California. Each car had speakers to broadcast sound effects triggered by an antenna underneath, computer-synchronized with lighting effects. The cars moved slowly through the cannon on a chain-driven conveyance into the darkened dome, slowly winding back down through a series of fantasy scenes such as a candy land and a polka dot sea, each populated by friendly, animated, imaginary creatures.

By the mid-1990s, the high maintenance costs and low capacity of the Voyage to the Moon led to consideration of alternative uses for the domed structure. Story Land's only dark ride operated for about 15 years before the dome was converted to Professor Bigglestep's Loopy Lab play area during the winter of 1998–99. The Loopy Lab contains an indoor playground full of foam balls, giant vacuums and hoses, and compressed air cannons. The original blackened ceiling was replaced by an all-white one in 2008.

In recent years, a full ride-through of the former attraction has appeared on YouTube. One of the ride's original bullet-shaped cars can be found at a miniature golf course in nearby North Conway.

== Attractions ==
- Grandfather Tree (interactive playground, featuring animated elements)
- Pirate Ship Playground
- Horse Race Game (a themed Elton Games Roll-a-Ball game)rethemed as Dino Dash
- Shooting Gallery
- Dutch Milking Cow
- Melody Farms Good Time Jamboree (animatronic show)
- Farm Follies (animatronic show)
- Professor Bigglestep's Loopy Lab (play area and show area)
- Dr Geyser's Mini Geysers
- Little Dreamers Nursery Rhyme Play Area

=== Featured interactive nursery rhymes and fairy tales ===
- "Humpty Dumpty"
- "Mary Mary, Quite Contrary"
- "The Old Woman in the Shoe" (Shoe and Character)
- "Goldilocks and The Three Bears" (House)
- "Little Red Riding Hood" (Grandmother's House)
- "Mary Had a Little Lamb" (School House)
- "Little Dreamers Play Area"
- "1,2 Buckle My Shoe"
- "Little Miss Muffet"
- "Peter, Peter, Pumpkin Eater"
- "Cinderella" (Castle & Character)
- "Heidi" (Grandfather's House)
- "Mother Goose Manor" (Character)

=== Animal attractions ===
All animals were replaced with cutouts in 2024.

- "Mary Had a Little Lamb" – lambs
- "Peter Rabbit" – rabbit
- "Three Billy Goats Gruff" – goats
- "Heidi" – goats
- "Goosey Goosey Gander" – geese
- "Chicken Little" – chickens
- "Three Little Pigs" – pigs
