= Conway Scenic Railroad =

Heritage railroad in New Hampshire, US

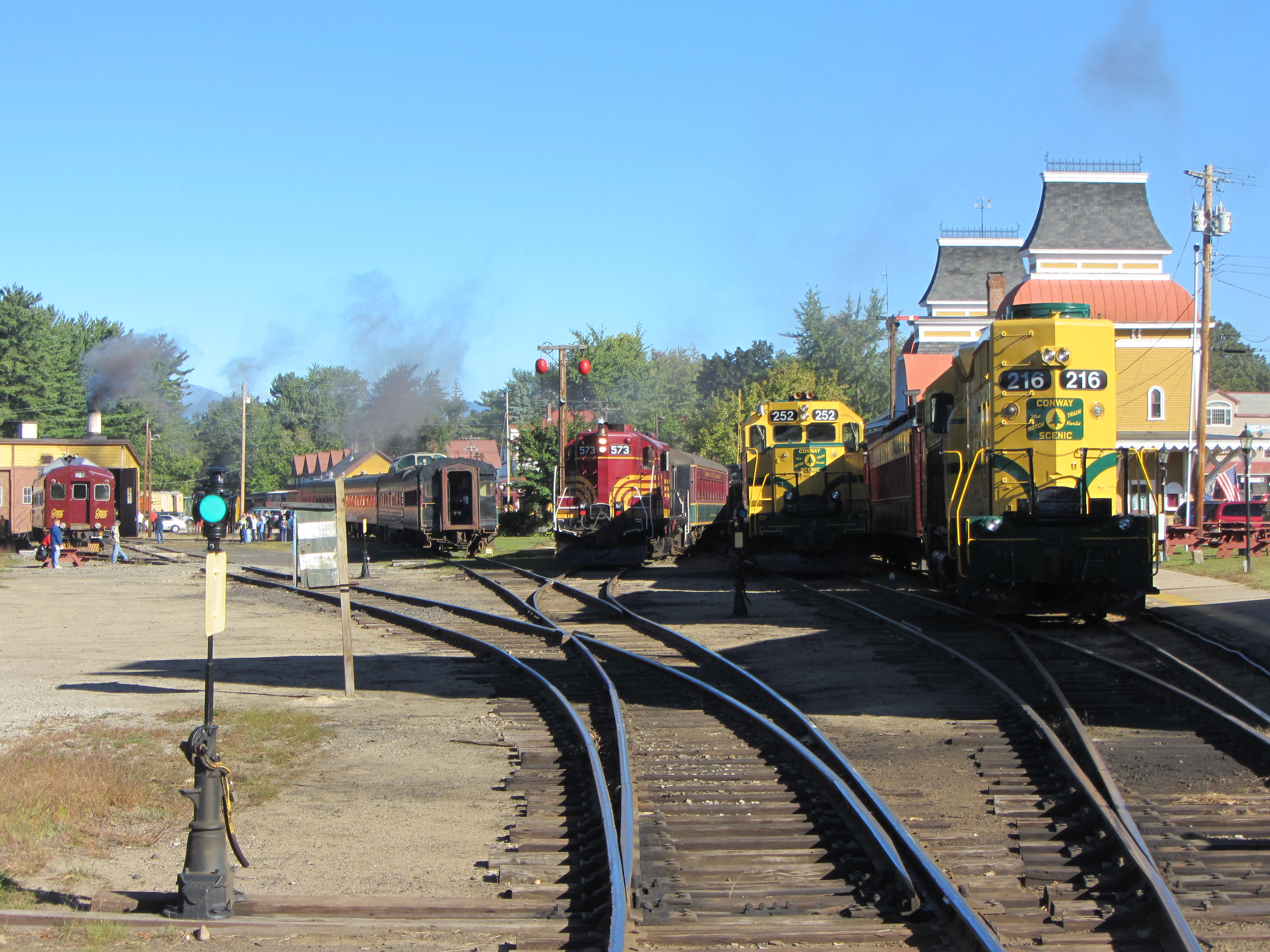
- GP35 No. 216, GP38 No. 252 and GP7 No. 573 at North Conway station
- Locale: White Mountains region of New Hampshire
- Connections: New Hampshire Central Railroad

Commercial operations
- Built by: Conway Branch: Portsmouth, Great Falls and Conway Railroad; Mountain Division: Portland and Ogdensburg Railroad
- Original gauge: 4 ft 8 1/2 in (1,435 mm) standard gauge

Preserved operations
- Owned by: Profile Mountain Holdings Corp; Mountain Division right-of-way owned by the State of New Hampshire
- Operated by: Conway Scenic Railroad
- Reporting mark: CSRX
- Stations: 1
- Length: 51 miles (82 km)
- Preserved gauge: 4 ft 8 1/2 in (1,435 mm) standard gauge

Commercial history
- Opened: 1872
- 1875: Mountain Division is completed and connected
- 1890: Boston and Maine Corporation acquires the Conway Branch
- 1972: Conway Branch abandoned north of Ossipee
- 1983: Crawford Notch regular service ends in September
- 1984: Last Crawford Notch train (October)
- 1992: Mountain Division abandoned east of Whitefield
- Closed: N. Conway Station 1961

Preservation history
- August 4, 1974: Started
- 1994: Mountain Division operations begin
- 1999: Sold to Russ and Dot Seybold
- January 30, 2018: Sold to Profile Mountain Holdings Corp
- Headquarters: North Conway

Website
- conwayscenic.com

The Conway Scenic Railroad (reporting mark CSRX) is a heritage railroad located in North Conway, New Hampshire, owned by Profile Mountain Holdings Corp. The railroad operates over two historic railway routes: a line from North Conway to Conway that was formerly part of the Conway Branch of the Boston and Maine Railroad, and a line from North Conway through Crawford Notch to Fabyan that was once part of the Mountain Division of the Maine Central Railroad. The Conway line is owned by Conway Scenic, and leases the Mountain Division that is owned by the State of New Hampshire.

The railroad's main terminal is located in historic downtown North Conway in the Mount Washington valley. The North Conway station complex has been listed on the National Register of Historic Places since 1979.

== History ==
The Conway Scenic Railroad was formed by Dwight Smith, who was an employee of the Boston and Maine Railroad in the late 1960s. After years of negotiations, Smith was able to convince his employer to sell a portion of the Conway Branch, which it planned to abandon, to him and two local businessmen in 1974, and the Conway Scenic Railroad began that year. In 1999, the original owners were bought out by husband and wife Russ and Dot Seybold and on January 30, 2018, the railroad was sold again to Profile Mountain Holdings Corp.

On August 3-4, 2024, the railroad celebrated its 50th anniversary.

On August 8, 2025, Dwight Smith, the founder of Conway Scenic Railroad, passed away at the age of 100.

== Operations ==
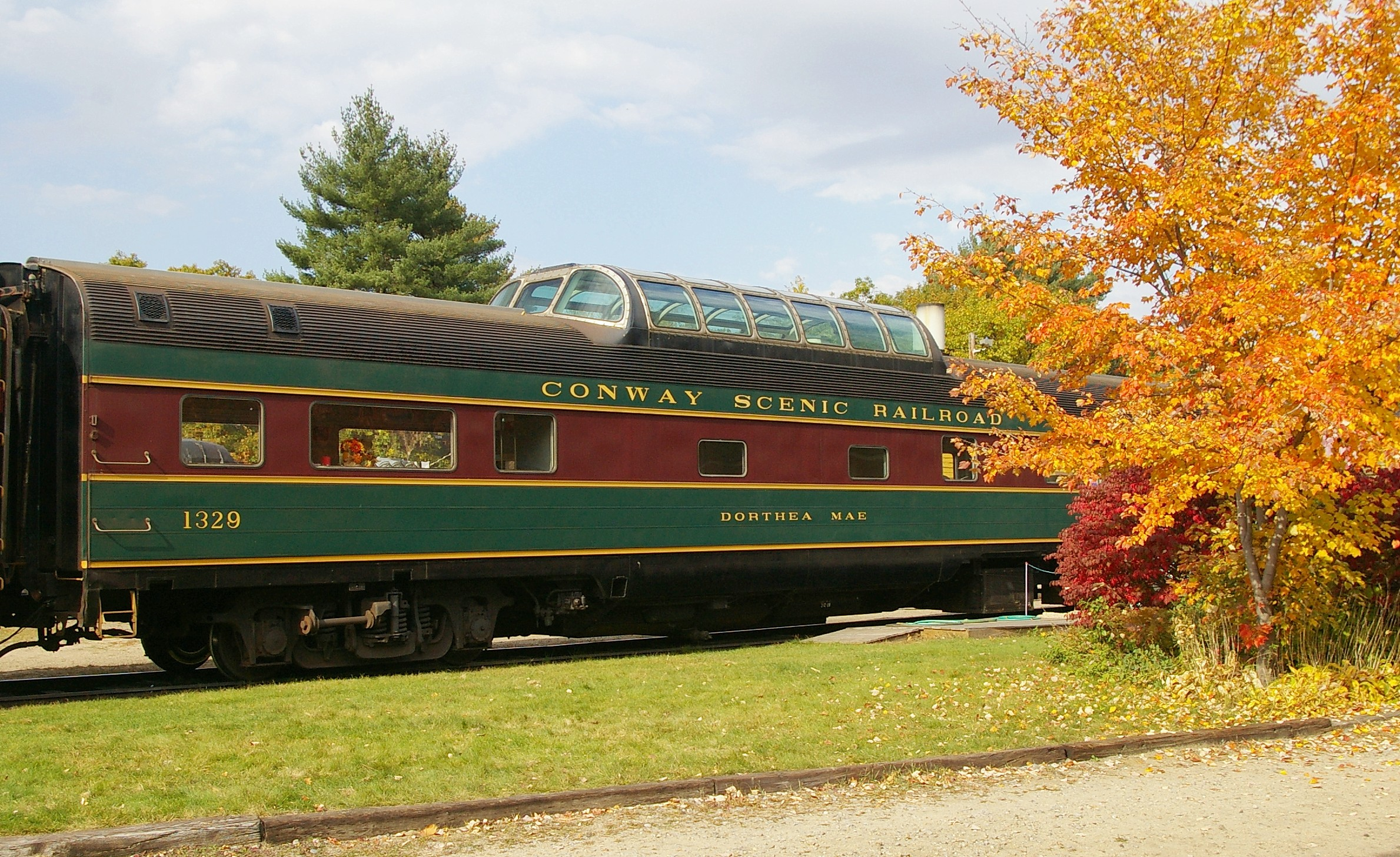
The Dorthea Mae dome car

Conway Scenic's Winter Mountaineer with Mount Washington in the background.

The railroad operates passenger trains out of its station in North Conway Village year-round. The railroad also operates the Mountaineer train from North Conway, through Crawford Notch up to Fabyan Station seasonally from May through November each year. Starting in 2024, the railroad began to operate through Crawford Notch year-round, dubbed as the Winter Mountaineer, although the distance travelled into Crawford Notch depends on weather conditions.

=== Special freight operations ===
On July 30, 1980, the first paid freight movement for the railroad occurred. A huge brush slasher was dropped off by the Maine Central at Intervale siding. From there, steam locomotive No. 108 hauled it from Intervale to Conway Village.

On June 20, 2009, a 20-axle Schnabel car was brought down through Crawford Notch carrying a 227-ton transformer for Public Service of New Hampshire, an electrical utility company. The train was led by locomotives No. 573, No. 6505 and No. 6516. It was the first scheduled freight train through Crawford Notch since September 3, 1983, and the first freight train of any kind since October 1984. The empty cars were shipped out nine days later, led by No. 6505 and No. 4266. This shipment completed the most recent revenue freight move for the Conway Scenic to date.

=== Future ===
In recent years, the Conway Scenic has been looking to restore the rest of the Mountain Division, specifically the stretch in Maine that runs from Fryeburg to Westbrook. The primary goal is to establish a new freight service to serve local businesses, though tourist operations are a secondary possibility. The line also faces the possibility of removal for a recreational rail-trail. In 2023, the railroad began transporting cruise ship passengers from Portland, Maine after acquiring the VIP Tour and Charter Bus Co.

== Equipment ==
=== Locomotives ===
Locomotive details (Note: Attributed to multiple sources:)
Number	Image	Type	Model	Built	Builder	Serial number	Status	Notes
7470		Steam	0-6-0	1921	Grand Trunk Railway	22/1500	Undergoing maintenance	Officially named "Dwight Smith" after the CSRX founder
23		Buddliner	RDC-1	1952	Budd Company	5504	Operational	Nicknamed "Millie"
216		Diesel	GP35	1965	Electro-Motive Diesel	30297	Operational	Originally owned by Pan Am Railways
252		Diesel	GP38	1966	Electro-Motive Diesel	32661	Operational	Originally owned by Pan Am Railways
255		Diesel	GP38	1966	Electro-Motive Diesel	32664	Operational	Originally owned by the Vermont Railway
360		Diesel	44-ton switcher	1942	General Electric	Unknown	Display	Owned by the State of New Hampshire
501		Steam	2-8-0	1910	American Locomotive Company	47732	Display, awaiting restoration	Previously owned by the 470 Railroad Club until 2018
573		Diesel	GP7	1950	Electro-Motive Diesel	12369	Operational	Nicknamed "Mr. Miller's Engine"
1741		Diesel	GP9	1957	Electro-Motive Diesel	23239	Operational	Owned by the 470 Railroad Club
1751		Diesel	GP9	1965	Electro-Motive Diesel	22036	Operational	Originally owned by Finger Lakes Railway
4266		Diesel	F7A	1949	Electro-Motive Diesel	8476	Operational	Owned by the 470 Railroad Club
4268		Diesel	F7A	1949	Electro-Motive Diesel	9932	Operational	Owned by the 470 Railroad Club

=== Visiting units ===
Locomotive details
Number	Image	Type	Model	Built	Builder	Serial number	Previous owner	Status	Current owner
Flying Yankee		Diesel-Electric	Streamliner	1935	Budd Company, Electro-Motive Corporation	Unknown	Boston & Maine Railroad	Under restoration	Flying Yankee Association

=== Former units ===
Locomotive details (Note: Attributed to multiple sources:)
Number	Image	Type	Model	Built	Builder	Serial number	Notes
15		Diesel	44-ton switcher	1945	General Electric	27975	Sold to Southern Prairie Railway
108		Steam	2-6-2	1920	Baldwin Locomotive Works	52820	Sold to Rannoch Corporation
1055		Diesel	S-4	1950	American Locomotive Company	78416	Sold to Downeast Scenic Railroad
1757		Diesel	GP9	1956	Electro-Motive Diesel	21888	Scrapped after being used as parts source for F7A 4268.
1943		Diesel	B23-7	1978	General Electric	42056	Sold to Finger Lakes Railway
2820		Diesel	U23B	1975	General Electric	40130	Sold to Finger Lakes Railway
6505		Diesel	FP9	1954	General Motors Diesel	A635	Sold to Pan Am Railways
6516		Diesel	FP9	1957	General Motors Diesel	A1046	Sold to Pan Am Railways

== 2022 fire incident ==
On the morning of January 3, 2022 at 4:44 AM, a radio inside No. 7470's cab caught fire, and it caused the inside of the locomotive's cab to burn up as well. The fire also damaged the spring in the whistle valve, causing the whistle to continuously blow, which alerted the nearby steam locomotive mechanic, who called 9-1-1. The nearby fire department arrived shortly afterward to put the fire out. Had it not been for the whistle valve blowing itself, the 1874-built roundhouse it was stored in would have received critical fire damage and collapsed onto No. 7470. The cab has since been repaired and the engine returned to service in June 2022.

== Appearances in film ==
In the 2005 Christmas film, The 12 Dogs of Christmas, starring Jordan-Claire Green, the museum's depot was filmed in several scenes during the beginning of the film, and the Conway Scenic's passenger cars were also used in the film.

== See also ==
- North Conway Depot and Railroad Yard
- List of heritage railroads in the United States
- List of heritage railroads in New Hampshire
- List of heritage railways
