= Glen, New Hampshire =

Unincorporated community in New Hampshire, United States

- Unincorporated community
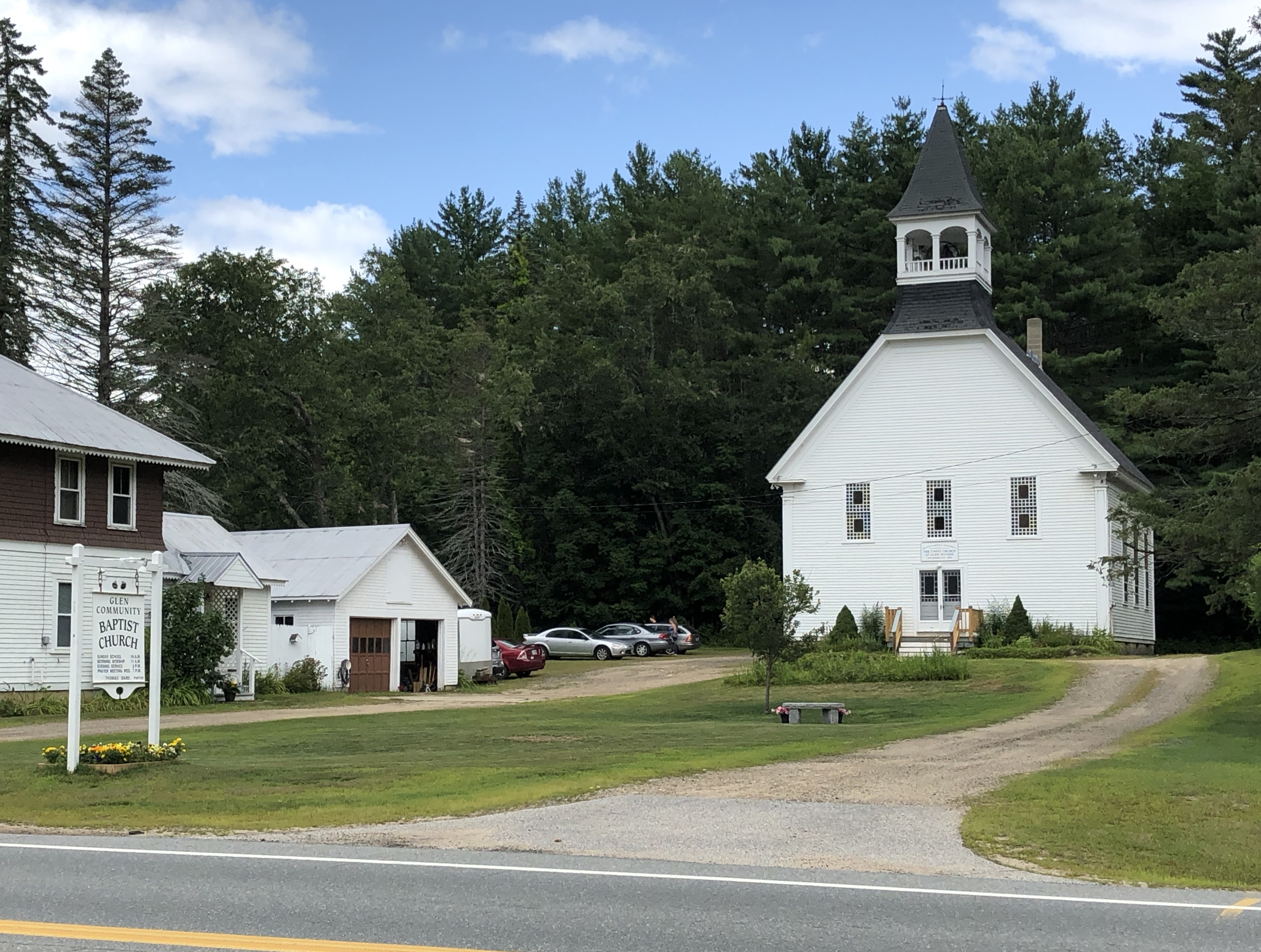
- Glen Community Baptist Church

- Location within New Hampshire Location within the United States
- Coordinates: 44°06′38″N 71°10′47″W
- Country: United States
- State: New Hampshire
- County: Carroll
- Town: Bartlett
- Elevation: 548 ft (167 m)
- Time zone: UTC-5 (Eastern (EST))
  - Summer (DST): UTC-4 (EDT)
- ZIP code: 03838
- Area code: 603
- GNIS feature ID: 871937

Glen is an unincorporated village in the town of Bartlett in the White Mountains of New Hampshire, United States. The village is the home of Story Land, a popular amusement park in the Mount Washington Valley region, a resort area that also includes the communities of North Conway and Jackson.

Glen is found at the intersection of U.S. Route 302 and New Hampshire Route 16, 5 miles (8.0 km) north of the center of North Conway and 6 miles (9.7 km) east of the center of Bartlett. Routes 302 and 16 travel north in a concurrency from North Conway and diverge in Glen. Route 16 continues north through Pinkham Notch to the communities of Gorham and Berlin, while Route 302 travels west through Crawford Notch towards western New Hampshire and into Vermont.

The village has a separate ZIP code (03838) from the rest of the town of Bartlett.
