= Duck Creek =

Duck Creek may refer to:

== Australia ==
- Duck Creek, former name of Leycester Creek, in the Richmond River catchment area of New South Wales
- Duck Creek (Clyde, New South Wales)

== New Zealand ==
- Duck Creek, former name of Wairaki Stream, in Lynfield, Auckland

== United States ==
=== Rivers ===
- Duck Creek (Smyrna River tributary), a stream in Kent and New Castle Counties, Delaware
- Duck Creek (Quad Cities), a minor tributary of the Mississippi in Scott County, Iowa
- Duck Creek (Kentucky), variant name of Taylors Creek
- Duck Creek (Barker Creek), a stream in Missouri
- Duck Creek (Upper Castor River), a stream in Missouri
- Duck Creek (Ohio), a stream in Ohio
- Duck Creek (Wisconsin), a stream in Wisconsin

=== Settlements and areas ===
- Duck Creek, Garland, Texas, an area in northeastern Dallas County
- Duck Creek Village, Utah, an unincorporated community
- Duck Creek Hundred, an unincorporated subdivision of Kent County, Delaware; see List of Delaware Hundreds

== See also ==
- Duck River (disambiguation)
- Duck (disambiguation)
