= Echo Lake =

Echo Lake may refer to:

== Canada ==
- Echo Lake (Saskatchewan), a lake in Saskatchewan
- Lost Echo Lake, a lake in Saskatchewan
- Echo Lake Provincial Park, in British Columbia
- Echo Valley Provincial Park, in Saskatchewan
- Echo Lake, Lake of Bays, Lake of Bays, Ontario

== United States ==
- Echo Lake, California, a town
  - Echo Lake (California), a lake near the town
- Echo Lake (Clay County, Florida), a lake near Melrose
- Echo Lake (Colorado), a lake in the Rocky Mountains of Colorado, located within Echo Lake Park
- Echo Lake (Maine), a lake in Fayette, Mount Vernon and Readfield Maine
- Echo Lake (Montana), a lake near Bigfork, Montana
- Echo Lake (Nevada), a lake in the Ruby Mountains
- Echo Lake (Franconia Notch), a lake in Franconia Notch State Park in New Hampshire
- Echo Lake (North Conway), a lake in the White Mountains of New Hampshire
  - Echo Lake State Park, North Conway, New Hampshire
- Echo Lake (New York), a mountain lake in the Indian Head Wilderness of the Catskill Mountains of New York
- Echo Lake (Charleston, Vermont), a lake
- Echo Lake (Shoreline, Washington), a lake located near Seattle
- Echo Lake (CDP), Washington, a community
- Echo Park Lake, a lake located within Echo Park, Los Angeles, California

== Other uses ==
- Echo Lake (band), an English alternative rock band formed in London in 2010
- Echo Lake (software), multimedia software produced by Delrina
- Echo Lake Entertainment, a film and television production company; see Doug Mankoff
- A themed area at Disney's Hollywood Studios in Florida

== See also ==
- Lake Echo
