= Duck (disambiguation) =

Duck is a name applied to several bird species of the family Anatidae.

Duck, The Duck or ducks may also refer to:

== Places ==
- Duck, North Carolina, United States, a small town
- Duck, West Virginia, United States, an unincorporated community
- Monte Creek, British Columbia, Canada, a rural locality originally named "Ducks"
- Duck Creek (disambiguation)
- Duck Island (disambiguation)
- Duck Lake (disambiguation)
- Duck River (disambiguation)

== People ==
- Duck (nickname)
- Duck (surname)
- Duck, a pseudonym of Don Manley (born 1945), a British compiler of crosswords
- FBG Duck, rapper, songwriter

== Arts and entertainment ==
=== Fictional characters ===
- Duck (Alice's Adventures in Wonderland)
- Duck the Great Western Engine a character from The Railway Series and the children's television series Thomas & Friends
- Duck, in the anime Princess Tutu
- Duck, in the British horror web series Don't Hug Me I'm Scared
- Duck, a main character in the British television show Sarah & Duck
- Duck, in the animated television series WordWorld
- Wayne "Duck" Newton, in the podcast The Adventure Zone
- Duck Phillips, in the AMC television series Mad Men
- Ducks, a race of sentient creatures in the Glorantha setting for the fantasy role-playing games RuneQuest and Suikoden
- Donald Duck and Daisy Duck, two animated characters from Walt Disney Animation Studios
- Daffy Duck and Melissa Duck (Tina Russo in The Looney Tunes Show), two characters from Looney Tunes

=== Music ===
- The Ducks, a 1977 rock band from Santa Cruz, California, with Neil Young and some former members of Moby Grape
- "The Duck" (song), a 1966 hit single by Jackie Lee
- Duck Records, a record label
- Duck Studios, a production studio based in Los Angeles, California
- Duck (album), a 2019 album by Kaiser Chiefs

=== Film and television ===
- Duck (film), a 2005 film by Nic Batterau
- Duck! The Carbine High Massacre, a 1999 film about a fictional school shooting
- Duck, a BBC Two television ident first aired in 1997; see BBC Two 1991–2001 idents
- "Duck! / Aren't You Chupacabra To See Me?", an episode of The Grim Adventures of Billy and Mandy
- "Ducks", an episode of the television series Teletubbies

=== Other media ===
- Duck (video game), a 1987 puzzle platform game for NES
- Ducks: Two Years in the Oil Sands, a 2022 graphic novel by Kate Beaton

== Brands and enterprises ==
- Duck Brand, a duct tape brand now used on a variety of products
- Duck Donuts, a doughnut shop
- On2 Technologies, formerly The Duck Corporation, which designed video codec technology
- Toilet Duck, a brand of toilet cleaner, known simply as Duck in the British Isles

== Sports and games ==
- Duck (bridge), a tactic in the card game of contract bridge
- Duck (cricket), a cricketing term denoting a batsman being dismissed with a score of zero
- Anaheim Ducks, a hockey team
- Beijing Ducks, a Chinese basketball team
- Long Island Ducks, a minor league baseball team
- Oregon Ducks, the sports teams of the University of Oregon

== Transportation ==
- American Canyon Transit, also known as "The Duck"
- Citroën 2CV, a car model nicknamed "The Duck"
- Ducati, a motorcycle company, sometimes shortened to "Duc" or "Duck"
- Duck (ship), one of several vessels by that name
- DUKW, commonly pronounced "duck", an amphibious six-wheel drive vehicle used by the US military during World War II
- Goodyear Duck, a 1940s amphibian aircraft
- Grumman JF Duck, a 1930s biplane amphibious aircraft built for the US Navy
- Grumman J2F Duck, amphibious aircraft derived from the JF Duck

== Other uses ==
- Duck, a lead weight used by draftsmen to hold splines in place
- Duck, a hypocorism or affectionate phrase, often used in parts of the Midlands and South Yorkshire in England, originally derived from the title Duke
- Duck, a very short cave sump
- Duck, in architecture, structures (particularly modernist) which are expressive in form and volume; named for the Big Duck
- Cotton duck, a fine strong cloth made from untwilled linen, later cotton
- Duck as food, the meat of the bird
- Duck Samford Stadium, a football stadium in Auburn, Alabama, nicknamed "The Duck"
- "Duck", the victim of Ducking (slang), a technique for manipulating prison staff
- Ducks (hiking) or cairn, a pile of three or more stones used to mark an off-trail hiking route

== See also ==
- Ducking, an audio effect commonly used in radio and music
- Duck and cover
- Duckie (disambiguation)
- Ducky (disambiguation)
