= Duck Lake =

Duck Lake may refer to:

== Canada ==
- Duck Lake (Vancouver Island), a lake in British Columbia
- Duck Lake, Halifax, a lake in Nova Scotia
- Rural Municipality of Duck Lake No. 463, Saskatchewan
- Duck Lake, Saskatchewan, a town
- Duck Lake (Saskatchewan), a lake

== United States ==
- Duck Lake (Iowa), a lake in Allamakee County
- Duck Lake State Park, in Muskegon County, Michigan
- Duck Lake, Michigan, an unincorporated community and lake in Clarence Township, Calhoun County
- Duck Lake (Grand Traverse County, Michigan), a lake
- Duck Lake (Kalamazoo County), a lake in Michigan
- Duck Lake (Blue Earth County, Minnesota), a lake
- Duck Lake (Montana), a lake in Glacier County
- Duck Lake (New York), a lake in Cayuga County
