= Duck Island =

Duck Island can refer to any of a number of places, including:

- Duck island (garden feature)

== Australia ==
- Duck Island (Victoria) in Australia
- Wild Duck Island, in Australia's Northumberland Islands chain

== Canada ==
- Duck Island (Newfoundland), one of the Wadham Islands
- Duck Island (Lake Huron), Ontario
- False Duck Island, in Lake Ontario
- Main Duck Island, in Lake Ontario

== United Kingdom ==
- Duck Island (Barnet) in the River Brent, Arkley, England
- Duck Island, a small island in St. James's Park lake, London
  - Duck Island Cottage, the headquarters of the London Gardens Trust
- Duck Island, County Antrim, a townland in County Antrim, Northern Ireland

== United States ==
- Duck Island (Milford, Connecticut), an island in Milford, Connecticut
- Duck Island, an island in Westbrook, Connecticut
- Duck Key, Florida
- Great Duck Island, Maine (sometimes simply called Duck Island)
- Duck Island (Isles of Shoals), Maine; see Isles of Shoals
- Duck Island, Maryland, an island in Washington County, Maryland
- Duck Island (Richland County, Montana), an island in the Yellowstone River in Montana
- Duck Island (Valley County, Montana), an island in the Missouri River
- Duck Island, in Squam Lake, New Hampshire
- Duck Island, a district in the Tremont neighborhood of Cleveland, Ohio
- Duck Island (New Jersey), a peninsula (formerly an island) at the confluence of the Delaware River and Crosswicks Creek
  - Duck Island, New Jersey, an unincorporated community on the northwest edge of the above peninsula
- Duck Island (New York), an island in New York
- Duck Island, in Green Lake (Seattle), Washington
- Duck Island (Vilas County, Wisconsin) (near the border with Michigan)

== Other places ==
- Ap Chau, near Hong Kong
- Patos Island (Venezuela), in Gulf of Paria
