= Duck (nickname) =

Duck is a nickname of the following people:

- Duck Edwing (1934–2016), American cartoonist, particularly for Mad magazine
- Donald "Duck" Dunn (1941–2012), bass player for Booker T. & the M.G.'s and The Blues Brothers
- Devlin Hodges (born 1996), American National Football League quarterback
- Jimmy "Duck" Holmes (born 1947), American blues musician
- Duck Baker (born 1949), American guitarist
- Duck MacDonald, American rock guitarist
- Donald "Duck" Richardson (1935–2011), American basketball coach
- Wayne Carey (born 1971), former Australian rules footballer

== See also ==
- Duck (disambiguation)
- Duck (surname)
- Ducky (disambiguation), which includes a list of people with the nickname
- Goose (nickname)
