= Duck (surname) =

Duck is a surname. Notable people with the surname include:

- Ann Duck (c. 1717–1744) Black British criminal hanged at Tyburn in 1744
- Arthur Duck (1580–1648), English lawyer and Member of Parliament
- Emma Duck (born 1981), British sprinter and hurdler
- Jacob Duck (1600–1667), Dutch painter and etcher
- Jenny Duck (born 1968), former field hockey player from New Zealand
- Nicholas Duck (1570–1628), English lawyer
- Richard Duck, English early 16th-century Vice-Chancellor of Oxford University
- Simeon Duck (1834–1905), British Columbia businessman and politician
- Stephen Duck (1705–1756), English poet
- Storm Duck (born 2000), American football player

== See also ==
- Ducke
- Duckie (disambiguation)
- Ducky (disambiguation)
