= Idiom (disambiguation) =

An idiom is an expression with a figurative meaning (not deducible from the individual words of the expression).

Idiom may also refer to:

- Idiom (language structure), the realized structure of a language, as opposed to other possible structures
- Variety (linguistics), a neutral term for labeling speech forms, without respect to their status as 'language' or 'dialect'
- Instrumental idiom, a concept in music
- Programming idiom, a concept in computer science
- Idiom Island, an island in Montana in the Yellowstone River
- Idiom, a company acquired by SDL PLC

Other:

- Idiomatic (horse), an American Thoroughbred race horse

== See also ==
- Idiom Neutral
- Idiom in English language
