= Ducky =

Ducky is a nickname and fictional character given name. It may refer to:

== People ==
- Princess Victoria Melita of Saxe-Coburg and Gotha (1876–1936), nicknamed "Ducky" within her family, British princess, granddaughter of Queen Victoria
- Ducky (coach), Filipino esports coach in Mobile Legends: Bang Bang
- Ducky Detweiler (1919–2013), American Major League Baseball third baseman
- Elvin C. Drake (1903–1988), American college track and field coach and trainer
- Dale Hawerchuk (1963-2020), Canadian National Hockey League centre
- Ducky Hemp (1862-1923), American Major League Baseball player and manager
- Ducky Holmes (1869–1932), American Major League Baseball outfielder
- Ducky Holmes (catcher) (1883–1945), American Major League Baseball catcher
- Joe Medwick (1911–1975), American Major League Baseball left fielder
- Clarence Nash (1904–1985), longtime voice of Donald Duck
- Ducky Pond (1902-1982), American college football and baseball player and football coach
- Ducky Schofield (1935–2022), American Major League Baseball infielder
- Don Williams (animator), Disney animator and illustrator
- Ducky Yount (1885-1970), American Major League Baseball pitcher

== Fictional characters ==
- Ducky (The Land Before Time), a saurolophus in The Land Before Time film series
- Ducky Mallard, medical examiner in the TV series NCIS, played by David McCallum
- Ducky, a character in the film Toy Story 4
- Ducky, a Splicer model in the video game BioShock
- Ducky, a supporting character in Dog Man

== See also ==
- Rubber ducky, a toy shaped like a stylised duck
- Duckie (disambiguation)
- Duck (disambiguation)
