= Black Duck River =

Black Duck River may refer to:

- Canada
  - Black Duck River (Manitoba–Ontario)
  - Black Duck River (Newfoundland and Labrador)
- United States
  - Black Duck River (Minnesota)

== See also ==
- Blackduck River, in Minnesota, United States
- Duck River (disambiguation)
