= Duck Creek Township, Stoddard County, Missouri =

Township in the US state of Missouri

Coordinates: 36.8886°N 90.1425°W

Duck Creek Township is a township in Stoddard County, in the U.S. state of Missouri.

Duck Creek Township was erected in 1850, taking its name from Duck Creek.
