= Mount Marion =

Mountain in New York, United States

- Location within New York Location within the United States

Highest point
- Elevation: 732 feet (223 m)
- Coordinates: 42°03′41″N 73°59′37″W

Geography
- Location: Kingston, New York, U.S.
- Topo map: USGS Saugerties

Mount Marion is a mountain located in the Catskill Mountains of New York north of Kingston. Mount Airy is located north-northeast, Overlook Mountain is located west-northwest, and Halihan Hill is located south-southwest of Mount Marion.
