= Goose (nickname) =

As a nickname, Goose or the Goose may refer to:

== People ==
- Jeff Agoos (born 1968), Swiss-born American retired soccer player
- Andris Biedriņš (born 1986), Latvian former basketball player
- Ida Burger, American dance hall girl and prostitute during the early 20th century, known as "Ida the Goose"
- Goose Curry (1905–1974), American baseball player and manager
- Robert Louis Freeman Sr. (1932–2003), American lawyer and politician
- Bob Gagliano (born 1958), American former football quarterback
- Paul Gaustad (born 1982), American formerice hockey player
- Jack Givens (born 1956), American former basketball player
- Alex Goligoski (born 1985), American ice hockey player
- Goose Gonsoulin (1938–2014) American football player
- Retief Goosen (born 1969), South African professional golfer
- Marc Goossens (born 1969), Belgian former race car driver
- Goose Goslin (1900–1971), American baseball player
- Simon Gosling (born 1969), British designer of special effects models
- Goose Gossage (born 1951), American former baseball pitcher
- Nikita Gusev (born 1992), Russian ice hockey player
- Vladimir Gusev (cyclist) (born 1982), Russian road racing cyclist
- Jim Ligon (1944–2004), American basketball player
- Matt Maguire (born 1984), Australian rules footballer
- Jesse Sergent (born 1988), New Zealand racing cyclist
- Tony Siragusa (1967–2022), American football player
- Goose Tatum (1921–1967), American basketball and baseball player

== Others ==
- Nick "Goose" Bradshaw, a character in the 1986 film Top Gun, played by Anthony Edwards
- Jim "The Goose" Rains, best friend of Max Rockatansky in the 1979 film "Mad Max", played by Steve Bisley
- Shane "Goose" Gooseman, a character in The Adventures of the Galaxy Rangers television show
- Coaltown (1945–1965), American Thoroughbred racehorse nicknamed "The Goose"
- Goose (Marvel Cinematic Universe), a cat-like alien featured in the Marvel Cinematic Universe films Captain Marvel and The Marvels

== See also ==
- Goose (disambiguation)
- Lance McCullers (born 1964), American former Major League Baseball pitcher nicknamed "Baby Goose"
- Duck (nickname)
