= Jockey Hill =

Mountain in New York, United States

- Location within New York Location within the United States

Highest point
- Elevation: 581 feet (177 m)
- Coordinates: 41°59′17″N 74°03′12″W

Geography
- Location: Stony Hollow, New York, U.S.
- Topo map: USGS Kingston West

Jockey Hill is a ridge located in the Catskill Mountains of New York northeast of Stony Hollow. Gallis Hill is located south-southwest, and Halihan Hill is located east of Jockey Hill.
