= Prison slang =

Language used in correctional institutions

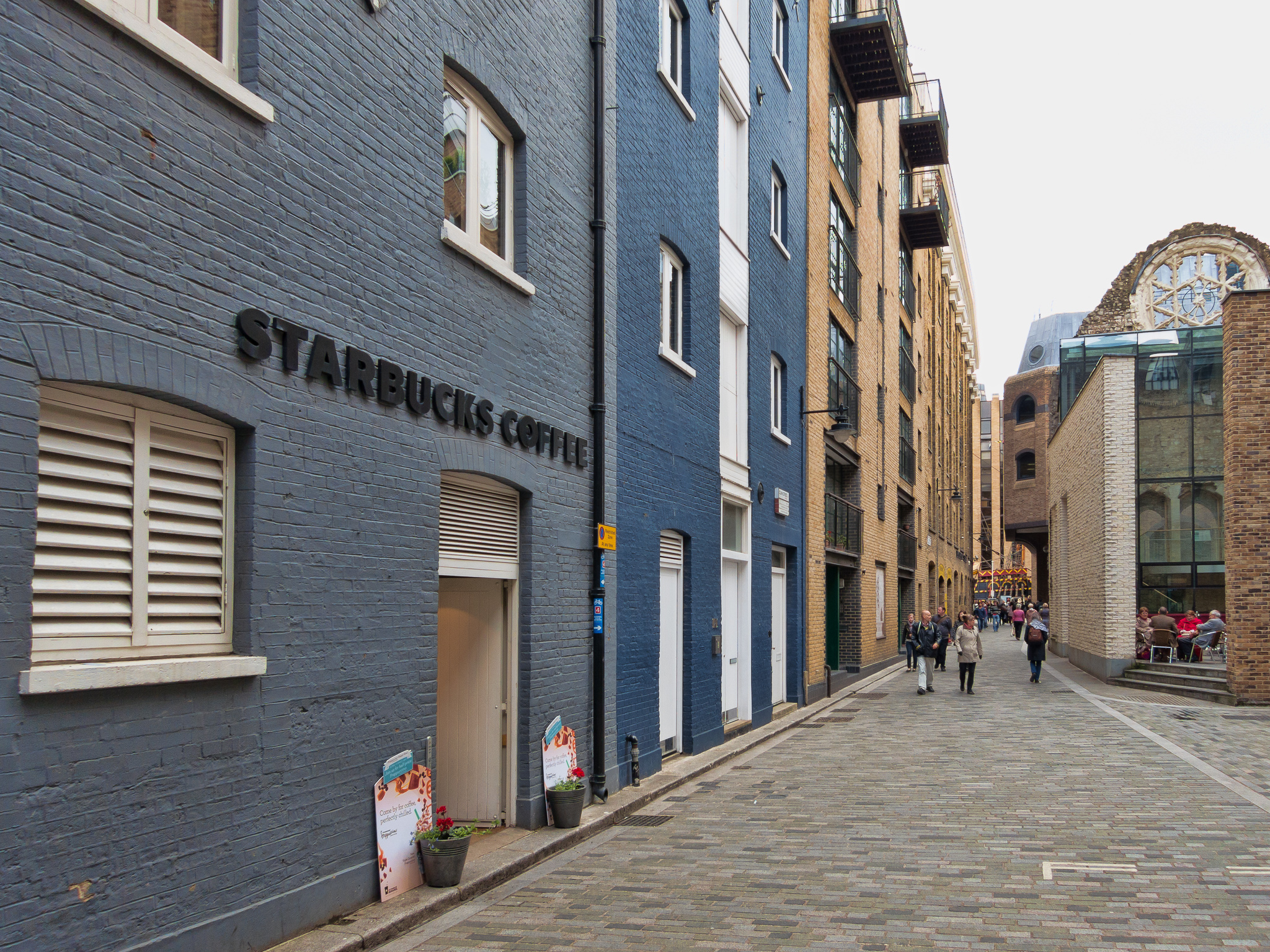
Clink Street, London. Site of Clink Prison, one of England's oldest prisons and origin of the slang "In Clink". Now home to a museum of the prison, the remains of Winchester Palace and a Starbucks.

Prison slang is an argot used primarily by criminals and detainees in correctional institutions. It is a form of anti-language. Many of the terms deal with criminal behavior, incarcerated life, legal cases, street life, and different types of inmates. Prison slang varies depending on institution, region, and country. Prison slang can be found in other written forms such as diaries, letters, tattoos, ballads, songs, and poems. Prison slang has existed as long as there have been crime and prisons; in Charles Dickens' time it was known as "thieves' cant". Words from prison slang often eventually migrate into common usage, such as "snitch", "ducking", and "narc". Terms can also lose meaning or become obsolete such as "slammer" and "bull-derm."

== Examples ==
Prison slang, like other types of slang and dialects, varies by region. For that reason, the origins and the movement of prison slang across prisons are of interest to many linguists and cultural anthropologists.

Some prison slang are quite old. For example, "to cart", meaning to transfer to another prison, has been in use in Glasgow since 1733.

A two-year study was done by Bert Little, Ph.D. on American English slang with the main focus being in the coastal plain region of the Southeast U.S. His study published by The Trustees of Indiana University on behalf of the Anthropological Linguistics journal goes on to provide an extensive glossary of common prison slang terms that he found circling through the prison systems. Studies by Alicja Dziedzic-Rawska from the Maria Curie-Skłodowska University in Poland describe prison slang as "extremely rich and creative" with new words being formed on a daily basis. These are mainly used as a means of security against unauthorized parties receiving a certain message and, in some cases, can be a way to ensure a prison inmate's survival within the cells.

=== Australia and New Zealand ===
Term	Definition
Bang	A drug injection (other terms include 'fix', 'hit' or 'shot').
The boneyard	Protective custody
Booshwa/fit	Syringe
Bupe/subbie	Buprenorphine/subutex
Can	A can of soft drink used as a commodity
Cellie	Cellmate
Chief	The title prisoners are expected to use to address prison officers
Cockatoo	An inmate tasked with alerting other inmates that prison officers are approaching
Crim	Criminal/inmate
Dog	An informant
Greens	Prison clothing
Laggon	Prison sentence
The pound	Solitary confinement
Red light	'Red light' is the code-word used by inmates to warn that prison officers are approaching
Rock spider	Child sex offender
Screw	Pejorative term for prison officer
Scrim	Pejorative term for inmates who work in clerical positions within the prison. Portmanteau of 'Screw' and 'Crim'.
Segro	Segregation wing
Shiv	Makeshift stabbing weapon
Spinner	An inmate acting strangely, highly associated with mental health issues
Sweeper	An inmate paid by the prison to do domestic duties
Turtles	The Squad. Specially trained and heavily equipped prison officers tasked with searching cells and riot control
Uncle Bully	An inmate convicted of child sex offences; a reference to a character from the film Once Were Warriors.

=== United Kingdom ===
Term	Definition
All-dayer	A prisoner serving a life sentence
Batts / Burn	Cigarettes / tobacco
Chokey	Category A prison
Bacon	Nonce (sex offender). Rhyming slang from 'bacon bonce'
Bird	Doing time. Rhyming slang from 'bird lime'
Cell warrior	Someone who acts tough in their cell but is cowardly in person
E-man	Someone who has tried to escape from prison
Nicker	Prison Chaplain
Pompey	Northern England slang for a prison, possibly originating from a notorious prison ship named HMS Pompee, that was anchored in Portsmouth Harbour in the early nineteenth century
Porridge	One time main meal (alleged) used as term for doing a prison sentence. Popularised by the popular BBC series Porridge – which in turn popularized many prison slang words
Screw	Prison Officer
Snitch / Grass	An informant
Stir	Serving a sentence (literally 'prison' in "in stir" or "doing stir")
Shank	An improvised stabbing weapon
Vanilla	A judge. Rhyming slang from vanilla fudge

=== United States ===
Term	Definition
Bagman	In organized crime, one who is charged with "collecting or distributing the money involved"
Bang	A drug injection (other terms include 'fix', 'hit' or 'shot')
Books	Inmate cash account. Alternatively books of postage stamps which can be used as currency
Bitch	An institutionally taboo epithet suggesting an inmate's femininity, helplessness and sexual submissiveness
Bunkie	A cell mate
Cell warrior	A prisoner who acts like a tough guy when locked in his cell, but is cowardly in person
Cho-Mo	Inmate incarcerated for child molestation
Cop / C.O.	Correctional Officer
Fish	A new or inexperienced inmate
Gassing	Throwing feces or other bodily fluids at a prison staff member or other inmate
The Hole	A separate, isolated unit with reduced privileges (such as payphones, television, games); alternately, solitary confinement
Hoop or hooping	Storing items or contraband in an inmate's rectum
Iced	A term for killing another inmate or prison guard
Jailhouse lawyer	An inmate who provides legal advice, possibly unqualified or specious, or an inmate who represents themselves
J-Cat	A disruptive inmate who causes disorder through highly irregular behavior in a jail module or prison yard, typically associated with those with drug or mental health issues.
Kite	A contraband note written passed to others.
Longjohn	A person who is not incarcerated and is having sexual relations with an inmate's wife
O.G.	'Original Gangster'; an older inmate
P.C.	Protective custody
Punk	An inmate perceived by other prisoners to not be masculine enough; may be used to refer to homosexuality but not necessarily
Rat	An Informant (an inmate who informs prison officials of any illicit activity within the prison system including prisoners and guards), also "snitch"
Shank/Shiv	An improvised stabbing weapon
Slop	An institutionally prepared entrée consisting of bland or poorly prepared vegetables
Take Flight	To initiate a fight with or jump another inmate
Ticket	A disciplinary report
Wham Whams / Zoo Zoos	Sugary treats like cookies and candy

=== Zimbabwe ===
Term	Definition
Base	Mattress
Bomb	Explosive or banned commodities
Boma	Prison
Bongirlfaya	Translates to the word "wildcat," means "peeping" (in reference to a cat's vision and sly behavior)
Cash	Money/bathing soap (due to soap being a commodity)
Chitima	Translates to the word "train," means "inmates who water the garden in a 'line' form"
Chikepe	Translates to the words "boat" or "ship," means "escaping from prison" (an allusion to a lonely ship smoothly sailing in a large sea)
Chikopokopo	Translates to the word "helicopter," means "tractor" (an allusion to a tractor's noise in a quiet environment)
Chibhonda	A person who was homeless or living on the streets before they arrived to prison
Chibhengebhenge	Translates to "useless person," means "noise" (an ideophone of a person's unproductive speech)
Dambarefu	Translates to "long play," means "a life sentence or a sentence that is ten years or longer" (in reference to the Long Play Record)
Dzokufa	Translates to "beans," means "the dead ones" (in reference to dried beans)
Gavhunga	Roughly cut green vegetables
Gumbakumba	Translates to "UD Nissan truck used to transport prisoners," means "collect" or "grab" (in reference to the Shona idiom that a person or animal that is not picky collects anything and everything)
Gozhla	Groceries
Ginyabvu	Translates to "an inmate charged with rape," means "to force" or "forcefully take"
Getsi getsi pascreen	Translates to "opening statement when someone is telling a story or movie," means "power" or "light on the screen"
Jega mudhuri	Translates to "leaning on the wall when the officers are counting prisoners in the cells," means "to carry the wall"
Kaza	Car
Kule	A respectful way of saying "grandfather" or "uncle"
Kudhonza tambo	Translates to "pretending to be sick", means "to pull a string" (in reference to wasting time)
Kucheka	Translates to "sexual intercourse," means "to cut" (could be in reference to homosexual sex, painful sex, or could be used by inmates to throw off officers from its original meaning)
Makadhibhokisi	Translates to "an inmate who leaks information to prison officers," means a snitch (in reference to the image of leaking)
Mwana	Translates to "child" (in reference to a man taking a female role)
Matabawo	Tablets/medication
Mutsara	Translates to "line," means "meat" (in reference to meat being a scarce commodity, thus becoming a "line" to opportunities)
Musoro wechitima	Translates to "head of the train," means "gang leader"
Munyoro	Translates to "soft one," means "a new inmate"
Muchini	Translates to "machine," means "needle"
Mbuya	A respectful way of saying "grandmother" or "aunt"
Mavhiri mudenga	Translates to "wheels in the air," means a beating underneath the feet
Mari	Translates to "money," refers to commodities that can be traded
Ngayaya	Marijuana
Nzondora	Translates to "chicken feet," refers to homosexual (in reference to chicken feet being a delicacy, could be in reference to enjoying something pleasurable)
Noczim	Cooking oil (in reference to the acronym for National Oil Company of Zimbabwe)
Ndege	Maniac or mentally-challenged
OK (Supermarket)	Rubbish pit
Panze	Outside
Police	A snitch (in reference to an inmate cooperating with the police who is then considered an ally of the police)
Razor	A small space where an inmate sleeps on
Stodart	Story telling or movie watching
Seridha	Cell
Shop dambu	Translates to "breaking a shop," means shoplifting (in reference to breaking into a shop and shoplifting)
Thornhill	Maniac or mentally-challenged (in reference to the Thornhill Airbase, an allusion to an airplane)
TV (television)	Window
TM (Supermarket)	Rubbish pit
Whiters	Fresh or sour cow's milk
Zvibhezhi	A hospital, clinic, or dispensary
Zviwanikwa	Translates to "discoverable," means illegal items (in reference to valuable commodities)
