= Duck Creek (Barker Creek tributary) =

Stream in Missouri, U.S.

Coordinates: 38.435298°N 93.521876°W

Duck Creek is a stream in the U.S. state of Missouri. It is a tributary of Barker Creek.

Duck Creek was named for the wild ducks in the area.

== See also ==
- List of rivers of Missouri
