= Echo Lake (New York) =

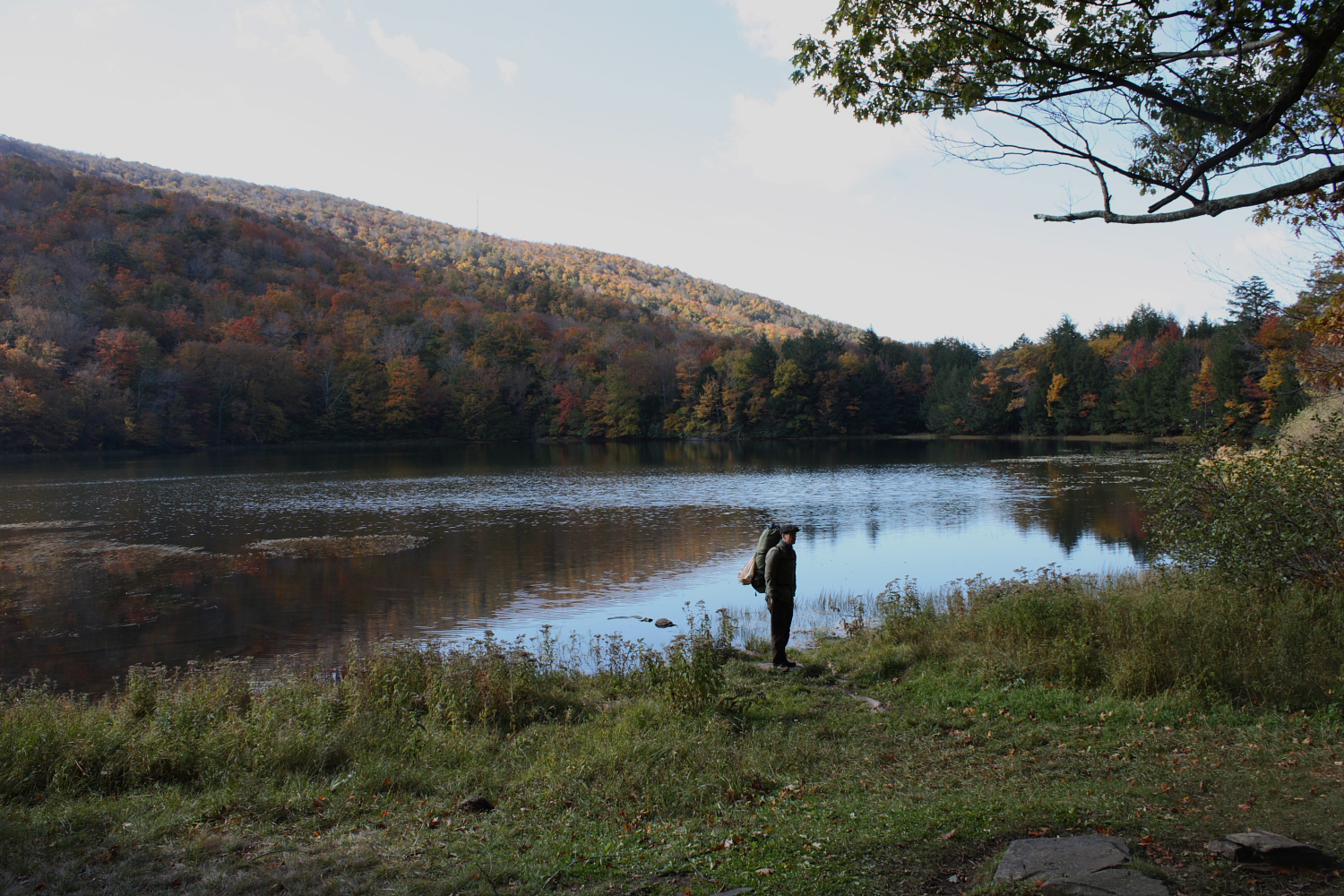
- Looking southwest across Echo Lake

- Location within New York Location within the United States
- Location: New York
- Coordinates: 42°5′46″N 74°5′25″W
- Type: lake

Echo Lake is a mountain lake within the Indian Head Wilderness of the Catskill Mountains, located in the valley between the two mountains Plattekill and Overlook, near Woodstock, New York, United States of America.

Echo Lake was historically named Shens Lake in state law defining the borders of Ulster County, circa. 1777-1801, or Shoes Lake in the Beer's 1875 Ulster County Atlas.

== Description ==
It carries many species of game fish, fowl, and amphibians. There is a lean-to and seven designated campsites near the lake. Access is by an 8-mile hiking trail, starting around Platte Clove Preserve (County Route 16) up the Old Overlook Road and then around Plattekill Mountain to a junction culminating in a half-mile section called Echo Lake Trail. Another route starts at the top of Mead's Mountain in Woodstock, NY; it is quite remote and camping in this spot is backcountry camping, accessible by backpacking only, with no hookups or facilities.

Echo Lake is also the Source of the Sawkill River, the main body of water which runs through Woodstock.

The psychedelic folk-pop band Woods named their 2009 release, At Echo Lake, in its honor.
