= Mount Airy (Ulster County, New York) =

Mountain in New York, United States

- Location within New York Location within the United States

Highest point
- Elevation: 610 feet (190 m)
- Coordinates: 42°06′45″N 73°58′58″W

Geography
- Location: Kingston, New York, U.S.
- Topo map: USGS Saugerties

Mount Airy is a mountain located in the Catskill Mountains of New York north of Kingston. Plattekill Mountain is located west, and Mount Marion is located south-southwest of Mount Airy.
