= Lake Echo =

Lake Echo may refer to the following places:

- Lake Echo (Polk County, Florida), a lake inside the city of Lake Alfred, Florida, United States
- Lake Echo, Nova Scotia, Canada
- Lake Echo Power Station, Tasmania, Australia

== See also ==
- Echo Lake
