= Gallis Hill =

Mountain in New York, United States

- Location within New York Location within the United States

Highest point
- Elevation: 794 feet (242 m)
- Coordinates: 41°57′21″N 74°04′08″W

Geography
- Location: NW of Kingston, Ulster County, New York, U.S.
- Topo map: USGS Kingston West

Gallis Hill is a 794-foot-tall (242 m) mountain in the Catskill Mountains region of New York. It is located northwest of Kingston in Ulster County. Jockey Hill is located north-northeast, and Morgan Hill is located west of Gallis Hill. In 1927, the Conservation Department built a steel fire lookout tower on the mountain. In 1950, the tower was closed and disassembled then moved to Overlook Mountain, where it still remains today.

== History ==
In 1927, the Conservation Department built a 60-foot-tall (18 m) Aermotor LS40 steel tower. The first standard design for the observer cabins was made in 1922, which had to be 12 by 16 feet (3.7 m × 4.9 m) in size and roofed/sided with asphalt shingles. A cabin of this design was built on the mountain the same time as the tower. The summit was accessed via a short train ride from Kingston, which brought visitors near the tower. In 1950, the tower was closed and disassembled then moved eight miles (13 km) north to a new site on Overlook Mountain, where it still remains today.
