= Halihan Hill =

Mountain in New York, United States

- Location within New York Location within the United States

Highest point
- Elevation: 522 feet (159 m)
- Coordinates: 41°59′23″N 74°01′08″W

Geography
- Location: Stony Hollow, New York, U.S.
- Topo map: USGS Kingston West

Halihan Hill is a ridge located in the Catskill Mountains of New York east-northeast of Stony Hollow. Jockey Hill is located west and Mount Marion is located north-northeast of Halihan Hill.
