= Ballantyne Lake =

Lake in the state of Minnesota, United States

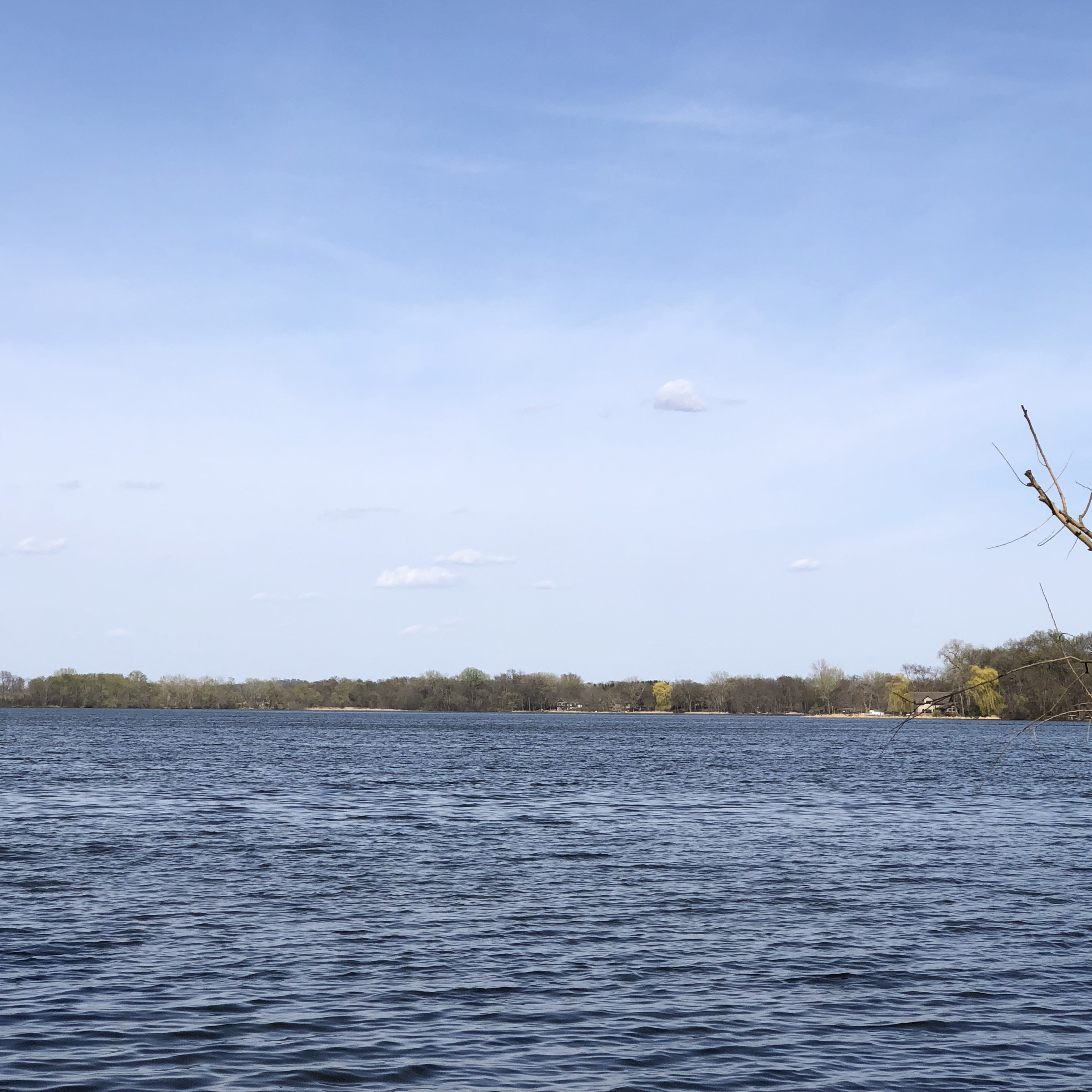

- Location within Minnesota
- Location: Blue Earth County, Minnesota, United States
- Coordinates: 44°12′43″N 93°50′08″W
- Primary inflows: creek from Duck Lake
- Basin countries: United States
- Surface area: 350 acres (1 km^{2})
- Max. depth: 58 ft (18 m)
- Surface elevation: 1,014 ft (309 m)
- Frozen: annually, in winter

Ballantyne Lake is a lake in Blue Earth County, Minnesota, in the United States.

Ballantyne Lake was named for James Ballantyne, an early settler.
