= Ducke =

Ducke is a surname. Notable people with the surname include:

- Adolpho Ducke (1876–1959), also known as Adolfo Ducke, an entomologist, botanist and ethnographer of Amazonia
- Peter Ducke (born 1941), German football player
- Roland Ducke (1934–2005), German football player
