= Duck Creek (Wisconsin) =

Stream in Wisconsin, U.S.

Coordinates: 44°33′37″N 88°01′09″W

Duck Creek is a stream in Brown and Outagamie counties, Wisconsin, in the United States.

Duck Creek was named for the many ducks seen along its banks by trappers. In the Menominee language, it is known as Sēqsepaketaheqkoneh, an archaic name meaning "duck landing place". The Oneida, whose reservation is centered on the creek, know it as taluˀkowánhne.

== See also ==
- List of rivers of Wisconsin
