= List of islands of Montana =

There are at least 115 named Islands in Montana. These islands occur in rivers, lakes and reservoirs.

== Islands east of the Continental Divide ==
=== Missouri River ===
- Archers Island, Chouteau County, Montana, 47°56′39″N 110°26′16″W, el. 2,562 feet (781 m)
- Baker Bar, Chouteau County, Montana, 47°50′20″N 110°37′14″W, el. 2,615 feet (797 m)
- Boggs Island, Chouteau County, Montana, 48°00′48″N 110°16′26″W, el. 2,513 feet (766 m)
- Brule Bar, Chouteau County, Montana, 47°52′44″N 110°30′10″W, el. 2,569 feet (783 m)
- Buckshot Island, Cascade County, Montana, 47°25′53″N 111°21′20″W, el. 3,323 feet (1,013 m)
- Chelsea Island, Roosevelt County, Montana, 48°06′52″N 105°20′07″W, el. 1,972 feet (601 m)
- Council Island, Chouteau County, Montana, 47°44′05″N 109°36′45″W, el. 2,408 feet (734 m)
- Cow Island, Blaine County, Montana, 47°46′20″N 108°56′52″W, el. 2,293 feet (699 m)
- Crow Coulee Bar, Chouteau County, Montana, 47°59′14″N 110°19′47″W, el. 2,529 feet (771 m)
- Duck Island, Valley County, Montana, 48°02′59″N 106°24′52″W, el. 2,044 feet (623 m)
- Evans Bend, Chouteau County, Montana, 47°51′08″N 110°34′28″W, el. 2,608 feet (795 m)
- Fisher Island, Cascade County, Montana, 47°24′35″N 111°18′25″W, el. 3,333 feet (1,016 m)
- Grand Island, Phillips County, Montana, 47°41′51″N 108°48′09″W, el. 2,316 feet (706 m)
- Holmes Council Islands, Fergus County, Montana, 47°44′38″N 109°33′15″W, el. 2,398 feet (731 m)
- Iron City Islands, Fergus County, Montana, 47°44′44″N 109°31′14″W, el. 2,388 feet (728 m)
- Jones Island, Phillips County, Montana, 47°37′25″N 108°35′50″W, el. 2,251 feet (686 m)
- King Island, Fergus County, Montana, 47°37′08″N 108°38′51″W, el. 2,260 feet (690 m)
- Lower Two Calf Island, Phillips County, Montana, 47°38′45″N 108°45′46″W, el. 2,277 feet (694 m)
- Nelson Island, Cascade County, Montana, 47°20′38″N 111°35′13″W, el. 3,350 feet (1,020 m)
- PN Island, Fergus County, Montana, 47°44′12″N 109°38′17″W, el. 2,408 feet (734 m)
- Park Island, Cascade County, Montana, 47°29′01″N 111°18′53″W, el. 3,317 feet (1,011 m)
- Pine Island, Cascade County, Montana, 47°10′52″N 111°48′33″W, el. 3,379 feet (1,030 m)
- Pablo Island, Chouteau County, Montana, 47°45′43″N 109°54′52″W, el. 2,467 feet (752 m)
- Roosevelt Island, Chouteau County, Montana, 47°48′16″N 110°41′23″W, el. 2,628 feet (801 m)
- Sacajawea Island, Cascade County, Montana, 47°31′07″N 111°18′18″W, el. 3,314 feet (1,010 m)
- Scout Island, Valley County, Montana, 48°02′02″N 106°25′30″W, el. 2,057 feet (627 m)
- Shonkin Bar, Chouteau County, Montana, 47°50′42″N 110°36′04″W, el. 2,615 feet (797 m)
- Skinners Island, Roosevelt County, Montana, 48°05′32″N 105°06′56″W, el. 1,952 feet (595 m)
- Steamboat Island, Cascade County, Montana, 47°31′47″N 111°14′27″W, el. 3,251 feet (991 m)
- Sturgeon Island, Blaine County, Montana, 47°47′56″N 109°05′02″W, el. 2,352 feet (717 m)
- Taylor Island, Cascade County, Montana, 47°28′07″N 111°19′01″W, el. 3,323 feet (1,013 m)
- Three Islands, Chouteau County, Montana, 47°58′12″N 110°22′09″W, el. 2,546 feet (776 m)
- Upper Two Calf Island, Phillips County, Montana, 47°39′23″N 108°46′58″W, el. 2,310 feet (700 m)
- White Shield Island, Roosevelt County, Montana, 48°05′03″N 105°03′39″W, el. 1,942 feet (592 m)
- Wolf Island, Chouteau County, Montana, 47°44′23″N 109°52′40″W, el. 2,447 feet (746 m)
- Yorks Islands, Broadwater County, Montana, 46°15′45″N 111°29′28″W, el. 3,855 feet (1,175 m)

=== Yellowstone River ===
- Beaver Island, Richland County, Montana, 47°26′05″N 104°20′12″W, el. 1,965 feet (599 m)
- Big Marys Island, Yellowstone County, Montana, 46°00′23″N 107°55′47″W, el. 2,854 feet (870 m)
- Breakneck Island, Richland County, Montana, 47°26′47″N 104°18′41″W, el. 1,946 feet (593 m)
- Buella Island, Richland County, Montana, 47°36′23″N 104°11′42″W, el. 1,913 feet (583 m)
- Cherry Island, Yellowstone County, Montana, 45°49′00″N 108°26′53″W, el. 3,081 feet (939 m)
- Chrome Island, Wibaux County, Montana, 47°20′43″N 104°24′40″W, el. 1,985 feet (605 m)
- Crittenden Island, Richland County, Montana, 47°29′15″N 104°17′02″W, el. 1,932 feet (589 m)
- Devils Island, Richland County, Montana, 47°26′28″N 104°20′02″W, el. 1,946 feet (593 m)
- Diamond Island, Richland County, Montana, 47°35′37″N 104°12′57″W, el. 1,909 feet (582 m)
- Dovers Island, Yellowstone County, Montana, 45°51′24″N 108°23′31″W, el. 3,045 feet (928 m)
- Duck Island, Richland County, Montana, 47°24′56″N 104°20′35″W, el. 1,968 feet (600 m)
- Elk Island, Richland County, Montana, 47°28′13″N 104°18′22″W, el. 1,942 feet (592 m)
- Elms Island, Richland County, Montana, 47°24′13″N 104°21′07″W, el. 1,952 feet (595 m)
- Government Island, Yellowstone County, Montana, 46°09′25″N 107°28′41″W, el. 2,703 feet (824 m)
- Gros Ventre Island, Richland County, Montana, 47°22′38″N 104°23′43″W, el. 1,955 feet (596 m)
- Idiom Island, Richland County, Montana, 47°21′47″N 104°23′59″W, el. 1,972 feet (601 m)
- Howery Island, Treasure County, Montana, 46°14′50″N 107°22′02″W, el. 2,664 feet (812 m)
- Joes Island, Dawson County, Montana, 47°16′08″N 104°31′54″W, el. 2,018 feet (615 m)
- Livingston Island, Park County, Montana, 45°39′38″N 110°32′43″W, el. 4,478 feet (1,365 m)
- Marys Island, Richland County, Montana, 47°23′09″N 104°22′10″W, el. 1,975 feet (602 m)
- Monroe Island, Dawson County, Montana, 46°58′20″N 104°47′22″W, el. 2,083 feet (635 m)
- Pirogue Island, Custer County, Montana, 46°26′26″N 105°49′02″W, el. 2,349 feet (716 m)
- Randalls Island, Yellowstone County, Montana, 46°02′00″N 107°51′09″W, el. 2,825 feet (861 m)
- Schaffer Island, Dawson County, Montana, 47°13′55″N 104°37′47″W, el. 2,011 feet (613 m)
- Seven Sisters Island, Richland County, Montana, 47°33′42″N 104°14′40″W, el. 1,903 feet (580 m)
- Siebeck Island, Park County, Montana, 45°38′28″N 110°33′51″W, el. 4,505 feet (1,373 m)
- Snake Island, Richland County, Montana, 47°21′10″N 104°24′42″W, el. 1,985 feet (605 m)
- Spraklin Island, Yellowstone County, Montana, 45°55′13″N 108°18′30″W, el. 2,995 feet (913 m)
- Westover Island, Carbon County, Montana, 45°35′05″N 109°04′40″W, el. 3,451 feet (1,052 m)

=== Other waters east of the divide ===
- Big Island, Sheridan County, Montana, 48°26′50″N 104°23′00″W, el. 1,942 feet (592 m) in Medicine Lake
- Bruces Island, Sheridan County, Montana, 48°28′26″N 104°27′05″W, el. 1,946 feet (593 m) in Medicine Lake
- Far West Island, Big Horn County, Montana, 45°38′04″N 107°40′02″W, el. 2,943 feet (897 m) in the Big Horn River
- Fire Island, Sweet Grass County, Montana, 45°49′16″N 109°56′58″W, el. 4,104 feet (1,251 m) in the Boulder River
- Gull Island, Sheridan County, Montana, 48°27′31″N 104°23′31″W, el. 1,936 feet (590 m) in Medicine Lake
- Long Island, Phillips County, Montana, 48°25′23″N 107°41′46″W, el. 2,211 feet (674 m) in Lake Bowdoin
- Lovell Island, Beaverhead County, Montana, 45°12′02″N 112°40′52″W, el. 5,138 feet (1,566 m) in the Beaverhead River
- Pelican Islands, Phillips County, Montana, 48°24′42″N 107°40′38″W, el. 2,211 feet (674 m) in Lake Bowdoin
- Smith Island, Beaverhead County, Montana, 45°12′20″N 112°40′41″W, el. 5,125 feet (1,562 m) in the Beaverhead River
- The Island, Carter County, Montana, 45°23′10″N 104°04′06″W, el. 3,199 feet (975 m) in the Little Missouri River
- Thunderbird Island, Glacier County, Montana, 48°47′23″N 113°24′51″W, el. 4,488 feet (1,368 m) in Saint Mary Lake
- Youngs Island, Sheridan County, Montana, 48°27′49″N 104°26′47″W, el. 1,949 feet (594 m) in Medicine Lake
- Wild Goose Island, Glacier County, Montana, 48°41′20″N 113°32′23″W, el. 4,488 feet (1,368 m) in Saint Mary Lake
- Woody Island, Phillips County, Montana, 48°24′18″N 107°40′57″W, el. 2,215 feet (675 m) in Lake Bowdoin
- York Island, Garfield County, Montana, 47°55′48″N 106°27′58″W, el. 2,333 feet (711 m) in Fort Peck Lake

== Islands west of the Continental Divide ==
=== Flathead Lake ===
- Bird Island, Lake County, Montana, 47°47′59″N 114°04′45″W, el. 2,943 feet (897 m)
- Bull Island, Lake County, Montana, 47°46′14″N 114°06′58″W, el. 2,999 feet (914 m)
- Cedar Island, Lake County, Montana, 47°53′45″N 114°09′58″W, el. 2,940 feet (900 m)
- Cromwell Island, Lake County, Montana, 47°51′01″N 114°15′49″W, el. 3,136 feet (956 m)
- Douglas Islands, Lake County, Montana, 47°56′01″N 114°10′06″W, el. 2,897 feet (883 m)
- Dream Island, Lake County, Montana, 47°48′43″N 114°13′50″W, el. 2,930 feet (890 m)
- Goose Island, Lake County, Montana, 47°56′55″N 114°10′40″W, el. 2,897 feet (883 m)
- Invitation Island, Flathead County, Montana, 48°04′15″N 114°13′01″W, el. 2,897 feet (883 m)
- Melita Island, Lake County, Montana, 47°49′17″N 114°14′08″W, el. 2,936 feet (895 m)
- Little Bull Island, Lake County, Montana, 47°46′05″N 114°07′30″W, el. 2,963 feet (903 m)
- Mary B Island, Lake County, Montana, 47°55′31″N 114°10′08″W, el. 2,897 feet (883 m)
- Rock Island, Lake County, Montana, 47°53′41″N 114°10′17″W, el. 2,910 feet (890 m)
- Shelter Island, Lake County, Montana, 47°53′44″N 114°10′27″W, el. 2,943 feet (897 m)
- Wild Horse Island, Lake County, Montana, 47°50′43″N 114°12′54″W, el. 3,494 feet (1,065 m)

=== Hungry Horse Reservoir ===
- Clayton Island, Flathead County, Montana, 48°14′23″N 113°50′10″W, el. 3,642 feet (1,110 m)
- Elk Island, Flathead County, Montana, 48°14′25″N 113°47′53″W, el. 3,596 feet (1,096 m)
- Fire Island, Flathead County, Montana, 48°17′43″N 113°53′49″W, el. 3,602 feet (1,098 m)
- Kelly Island, Flathead County, Montana, 48°15′55″N 113°49′18″W, el. 3,602 feet (1,098 m)
- Lost Island, Flathead County, Montana, 48°12′08″N 113°45′58″W, el. 3,606 feet (1,099 m)

=== Lake Koocanusa ===
- Cedar Island, Lincoln County, Montana, 48°38′07″N 115°17′48″W, el. 2,464 feet (751 m)
- Kins Island, Lincoln County, Montana, 48°53′42″N 115°11′44″W, el. 2,464 feet (751 m)
- Murray Island, Lincoln County, Montana, 48°54′11″N 115°11′35″W, el. 2,464 feet (751 m)
- Whites Island, Lincoln County, Montana, 48°56′47″N 115°10′02″W, el. 2,464 feet (751 m)
- Yarnell Island, Lincoln County, Montana, 48°27′30″N 115°17′46″W, el. 2,533 feet (772 m)

=== Other waters west of the divide ===
- Deer Island, Flathead County, Montana, 48°07′04″N 114°01′59″W, el. 3,048 feet (929 m) in Echo Lake
- Callows Island, Lincoln County, Montana, 48°15′18″N 115°51′09″W, el. 2,402 feet (732 m) in Bull Lake
- Firemens Island, Flathead County, Montana, 48°08′05″N 114°03′23″W, el. 3,012 feet (918 m) in Echo Lake
- Kelly Island, Missoula County, Montana, 46°51′50″N 114°06′27″W, el. 3,113 feet (949 m) in the Clark Fork River
- Pleasant Island, Flathead County, Montana, 48°09′59″N 114°21′22″W, el. 3,343 feet (1,019 m) in Foy Lake
- Rock Island, Sanders County, Montana, 47°56′26″N 115°42′44″W, el. 2,336 feet (712 m) in Noxon Reservoir
- Scott Island, Lincoln County, Montana, 48°28′48″N 115°53′51″W, el. 1,857 feet (566 m) in the Kootenai River
- Sourdough Island, Missoula County, Montana, 47°06′15″N 113°24′39″W, el. 3,930 feet (1,200 m) in Salmon Lake (Montana)
- Steamboat Island, Sanders County, Montana, 47°35′02″N 115°19′40″W, el. 2,405 feet (733 m) in the Clark Fork River
- The Island, Flathead County, Montana, 48°26′10″N 114°22′50″W, el. 2,999 feet (914 m) in Whitefish Lake
