= Duck Lake (Kalamazoo County) =

Lake in the state of Michigan, United States

- Location within Michigan
- Location: Kalamazoo, Michigan
- Coordinates: 42°24′30″N 85°22′54″W
- Type: Lake
- Basin countries: United States
- Surface elevation: 896 ft (273 m)

Duck Lake is a lake in Kalamazoo County, Michigan.
