= Duck Island (New Jersey) =

Peninsula in Mercer County, New Jersey, US

- Location within New Jersey

Geography
- Location: Delaware River
- Coordinates: 40.1769°N 74.7275°W
- Highest elevation: 10 ft (3 m)

Administration
- United States
- State: New Jersey
- County: Mercer
- Township and City: Hamilton and Trenton

Duck Island is a peninsula and former island in the wetlands at the confluence of the Delaware River and Crosswicks Creek in Mercer County, New Jersey, United States. It is mostly located within Hamilton Township, but its northwest edge crosses the Trenton city limits. The community of Duck Island is located near the northwest end of the former island, along the Trenton/Hamilton border. The peninsula is flanked by the Delaware and Raritan Canal State Park.

== History ==
In 1891, Henry Smith escaped from Trenton State Prison to Duck Island by cutting through the prison roof. A channel known as Duck Creek once separated Duck Island from the rest of New Jersey, but it had been partially filled in by 1947. Since 1995, Interstate 295 has crossed the southeastern portion of the peninsula.

In 1996 there were plans to build a $260 million trash incinerator on Duck Island, but the proposal was defeated by the Board of Chosen Freeholders for Mercer County, New Jersey.
