= List of The Adventures of the Galaxy Rangers characters =

This article showcases characters from the television show The Adventures of the Galaxy Rangers.

== Protagonists ==
=== Zachary Foxx ===
Zachary Foxx (voiced by Jerry Orbach) is the captain of the series 5 Rangers. He was seriously injured in a battle with a space Pirate named Captain Kidd, resulting in the left side of his body being replaced with bionics. Foxx's bionics allow him to fire blasts of energy with his left arm and gives him extraordinary strength. Foxx is married and a father of two; his wife's mind was kidnapped by the Queen of the Crown and is contained in a "psychocrystal".

=== Shane Gooseman ===
Shane "Goose" Gooseman was genetically produced in a test tube as part of a government genetic experiment to create a group of enhanced mutant soldiers known as "Supertroopers". A civilian adviser dosed the Supertroopers with a gas meant to speed up their mutation and make them more powerful, but had the side effect of making the Supertroopers more aggressive and mentally unstable. Goose was at the firing range at the time, and thus avoided the gas, thereby becoming the only remaining unaffected trooper. The other troopers were cryogenically imprisoned, but some escaped. Goose was given the option to avoid cryogenic freezing on the condition that he join the Galaxy Rangers and hunt down the escaped Supertroopers. Goose's bionic implants allow him limited control over his body's molecules giving him the ability to heal, absorb energy, and transform his body to adapt to various environmental conditions.

=== Niko ===
Niko is an archaeologist specializing in ancient cultures. She possesses innate psionic abilities, which allow her to create shields, telekinetically lift objects, and perform clairvoyance. Niko's implant acts as an amplifier, boosting her psionic abilities and increasing their range to several light years. She can also generate a shield of ambient energy which will dramatically drain her implant, but can be augmented by touching the other rangers and drawing power from them.

Niko was born on the colony Alspeth and raised on the planet Xanadu after Alspeth was destroyed. At the age of 19, she left Xanadu to return to her people and joined the Galaxy Rangers. After the academy, she was accepted into the experimental Series 5 program. She was later assigned to the Series 5 Rangers as their mystic and archaeological expert.

=== Walter Hartford ===
Walter "Doc" Hartford is a swashbuckling character who fights with a sword, a gun, and his fists. He is a computer genius who, along with the BETA Scientist 'Q-Ball', is responsible for most of the automated systems that the Galaxy Rangers use. His series 5 implants allow him to control any computer system through the use of "programs", which appear as holographic geometric shapes that he can communicate with. Doc's Computer Diagnostic Unit (CDU) acts as a focus for his implant abilities.

Doc was born in Jamaica to wealthy parents, and was educated in private school. He left to join the Ranger Corps after he signed up with some biochemical corporations to help them produce better computer programs, but found out that his skills were not being challenged.

=== Other ===
==== Eliza Foxx ====
She is kidnapped by the queen and held captive.

==== Waldo Zeptic ====
Waldo Zeptic is an Ambassador from Andor. The ambassadors are in very close contact with the Rangers and Commander Walsh at all times, and are friends of the Foxx family. Zeptic is also a brilliant mathematician and engineer. He avoids violence, but will protect himself with a personal force field.

==== Zozo ====
Zozo is the ambassador from the farm planet of Kirwin. The Kiwi are very much the opposite of the Andorians; whereas the Andorians are a highly technical society and coolly logical people, the Kiwi are very "down-to-earth" and emotional. Zozo is cheerful, loves a good time, and approaches most everything with a sense of humor. He is also quite skilled at hand-to-hand combat.

==== Commander Walsh ====
Joseph Walsh is the Rangers' commanding officer, as well as the head of BETA, (Bureau for Extra-Terrestrial Affairs) located in Beta Mountain. With Dr. Negata, Walsh was in charge of the failed Supertrooper Project, of which Shane Gooseman is the only sane survivor. He has been known to bend the rules for them such as when the Council of Leaders of the World Federation (typified by Senator Weiner) tried to put Goose behind bars for a crime he did not commit.

==== Buzzwang ====
Buzzwang is an android whose biggest dream was to become a ranger, which he eventually did. He is Q-ball's creation, and in his spare time, he likes to breakdance.

==== Q-Ball ====
Q-Ball is a comic relief mad scientist.

==== Cybersteeds ====
The Cybersteeds are robotic horses designed by the scientists at BETA and the Long Shot Research facility. The Cybersteeds comprise fully intelligent artificial intelligences combined with robot chassis in the form of a horse - enabling speech, great stability, and speed over all types of terrain.

Each Ranger has a Cybersteed matched to them, and each horse is built especially for their rider. The four horses are Triton (Goose's Cybersteed), Voyager (Niko's Cybersteed), Mel (Doc's Cybersteed), and Brutus (Zachary Foxx's Cybersteed).

== Antagonists ==
=== Captain Kidd ===
Captain Kidd is a Plitsky pirate who initially works for the Queen. After capturing the ship transporting the Foxx family, Kidd becomes annoyed by the Queen's refusal to allow him to take the ship as a prize vessel and turns on her. Kidd becomes an independent pirate and cuts a deal to aid the Rangers in exchange for a "trade alliance" and continued freedom.

=== Lazarus Slade ===
Lazarus Slade is a scientist who works for the Queen of the Crown.

=== Daisy O'Mega ===
Daisy O'Mega is a space pirate who appeared in the episode, "Renegade Rangers". She is a highly proficient marksman, capable of out-gunning everyone she comes across.

=== Nimrod ===
Nimrod is a cat-like humanoid who wears a multi-colored mane reminiscent of a rainbow wig. Nimrod is first seen in the episode "The Power Within", where he captures and deprives the Rangers of the use of their Series 5 badges. However, they pass his tests and prove themselves worthy of preservation.

In other appearances, he was less of a villain. Nimrod's attempt to form a rock band in "Battle of the Bandits" is successful, but the stage act of impersonating Slaverlords enrages the Queen, who replaces his backup band with real Slaverlords. In "Murder on the Andorian Express", Nimrod aids Doc and Niko in tracking a Crown assassin on a luxury liner.

=== Queen of the Crown ===
The Queen of the Crown is the head of a vast and crumbling empire. The Queen is an accomplished sorceress who often uses technology to make her considerable power all the more vile. In "Mindnet," she takes control of an experimental telepathy booster, which is later used in "Battle of the Bands" to control the minds of thousands of concert attendees.

=== Scarecrow ===
The Scarecrow is an ancient, powerful alien monster with the ability to drain the life force of others. It was created long ago during a war between the Tarkon and a now-forgotten enemy. Upon defeat, it was forced into hibernation for uncounted millennia under the surface of the planet Granna. In the present day, the creature is disturbed and awakened by a Kiwi agricultural analysis device. Goose nicknames the creature Scarecrow after a ghost story he heard from the locals.

=== Supertroopers ===
The Supertroopers are a group of genetically engineered supersoldiers that Goose must hunt down. The at-large supertroopers escaped the Wolf Den training facility after Senator Wheiner unleashed a powerful, mutagenic gas named X-Factor into the supertrooper's barracks. All except Shane Gooseman were affected and swore revenge against Owen Nagata, their creator.

==== Brainchild ====
Brainchild is a genetically enhanced general for the supertroopers who is super-intelligent, paranoid, and arrogant, designed to be a master strategist.

==== Chimera ====
A female supertrooper with powerful mind-controlling powers, who uses deception and surprise to attack at will. She has combat techniques, advanced hand-to-hand combat skills.

==== Darkstar ====
Darkstar is able to generate a field of darkness via a series of energy globules that emit from her eyes and surround the target, effectively blinding them for a short periods of time. Her powers, enhanced by the Wolf Den incident, allow her to induce permanent blindness in her targets. She also heals faster than a normal human, and has enhanced reflexes and combat training that enable her to be an effective close combat soldier.

==== Gravestone ====
Gravestone is designed to be the ultimate gladiatorial combat warrior. He has highly enhanced strength, thickened skin, and bulked muscle, to enable him to withstand most forms of hand-to-hand combat. Gravestone can transform his skin into a hard, granite-like rock, granting him enhanced strength and durability.

==== Jackhammer ====
Jackhammer is a front-line agent whose very fast reflexes enable him to live up to his name. Jackhammer was once clocked at two hundred blows per minute in testing. With the strength he can bring to bear, this level of impact can generate sympathetic vibrations in structures sufficient to collapse buildings and damage the foundations of bridges, etc.

==== Ryker Killbane ====
Ryker Killbane is a bio-defense close combat soldier. In some ways, he is the prototype for the type of Soldier that Shane Gooseman was crafted on. Killbane has bio-defense abilities similar to Goose's, but also has the ability to blow poison gas from glands in his mouth. He can also emit sharpened spikes from his fists and can transform his body into numerous, powerful forms because of his enhanced DNA bio-defenses. Killbane has become twisted by the genetic enhancement and has focused all his rage and anger on Goose, his old rival.

==== Stingray ====
Stingray is an Energy Projector. His primary ability is to be able to channel bio-electric energy along his optic nerves, which have been altered to lase the energy into a powerful beams of light. He has to remove his sunglasses in order to use his abilities, and the sunglasses also work to conceal the mutant appearance of his eyes.
