= Ann Duck =

British criminal

- Born: c.1717 Cheam, Surrey
- Died: 1744; Tyburn
- Occupation: criminal

Ann Duck (c. 1717–1744) was a British criminal hanged at Tyburn in 1744. Her trials at the Old Bailey show that it was her crimes and not her mixed race that was the focus of those prosecuting her.

== Early life ==
Ann Duck was baptised on 22 July 1717 in Cheam, Surrey, shortly before her parents married. Her father, John Duck, was Black, whilst her mother Ann was white. Her father had been in service with Edward Green of Nonsuch Park, near Cheam but became a teacher of swordsmanship to men at the London inns of court soon after he married. The Duck family lived in Little White's Alley, just off Chancery Lane. Ann had at least three younger siblings: John (bap. 1719), Elizabeth (bap. 1724, bur. 1727) and Mary (bap. 1729).

Ann learned to read and write, and to do accounts, and is thought to have worked as a shop assistant for a time.

In September 1740 her brother John sailed with Commodore Anson's squadron to South America aboard HMS Wager, which was wrecked off the coast of Chile eight months later – a crewmate claimed that he was later sold into slavery on account of his skin colour.

Their father John died in October 1740, which left the household without male earnings.

== Criminal career ==
Ann became a servant in a bawdy house, but by 1742 she was a member of the "Black Boy Alley Gang" of Clerkenwell. That year she was tried for assaulting a man. It appears that she was able to get away with crimes of violence because witnesses were afraid of her associates.

The records of her life in the courts indicate that there was "no apparent prejudice" against black people and her appearance and her parents mixed-race marriage was considered unremarkable. Duck's crimes did not go unnoticed and in 1743 she was described as a "vile character" at the Old Bailey. After nineteen arrests she was finally sentenced to be hanged on 17 October 1744.

Duck confessed and was hanged at Tyburn in 1744. Her trial may not have been fair as John Forfar was paid five shillings and ninepence for assisting in the conviction of Duck and another criminal named Ann Barefoot.
