= Barker Creek =

Stream in Missouri, U.S.

Barker Creek is a stream in Benton, Henry and Pettis counties in the U.S. state of Missouri. It is a tributary of Tebo Creek.

The stream headwaters arise in southern Pettis County east of Windsor. The stream flows south-southwest through the northwest corner of Benton County and into Henry County east of Calhoun. It passes west of Roseland and enters Tebo Creek within the waters of Truman Reservoir and the Tebo State Wildlife Area. The headwaters are at 38°31′38″N 93°28′08″W and the confluence is at 38°22′26″N 93°35′13″W.

Barker Creek has the name of Dick Barker, a pioneer citizen.

== See also ==
- List of rivers of Missouri
