= Duck Lake (Blue Earth County, Minnesota) =

Lake in the state of Minnesota, United States

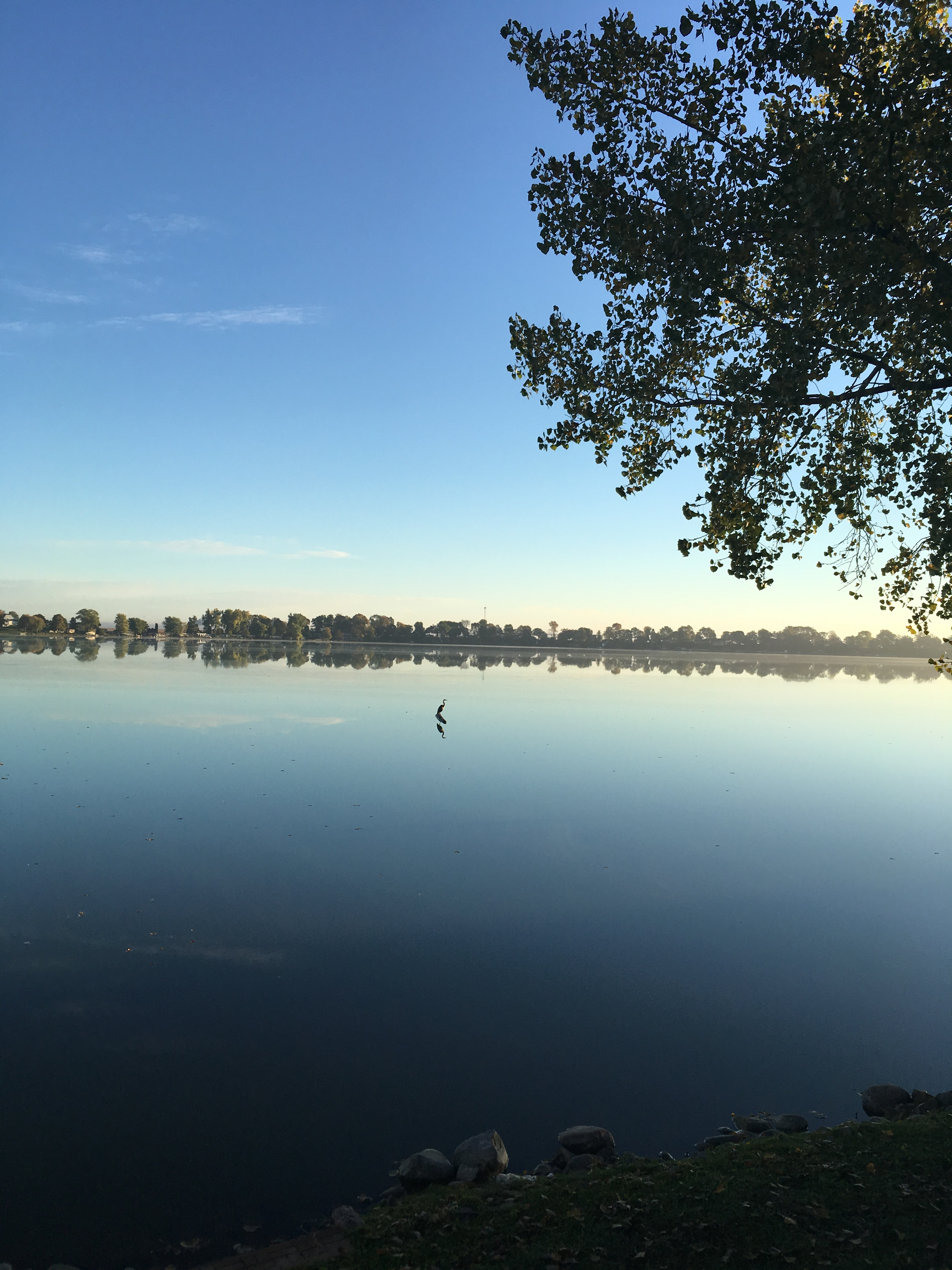

- Location within Minnesota
- Location: Blue Earth County, Minnesota, United States
- Coordinates: 44°13′5″N 93°48′57″W
- Primary outflows: creek to Ballantyne Lake
- Basin countries: United States
- Surface area: 290 acres (1 km^{2})
- Max. depth: 25 ft (8 m)
- Surface elevation: 1,017 ft (310 m)
- Frozen: annual December 1 — April 4 (Based on median ice in/out dates)

Duck Lake is a lake in Blue Earth County, Minnesota, in the United States. It is nearby the city of Madison Lake, Minnesota.

Duck Lake was named for the duck, a popular family of waterfowl seen in the area.
