= Duck Island, New Jersey =

Populated place in Mercer County, New Jersey, US

- Unincorporated community
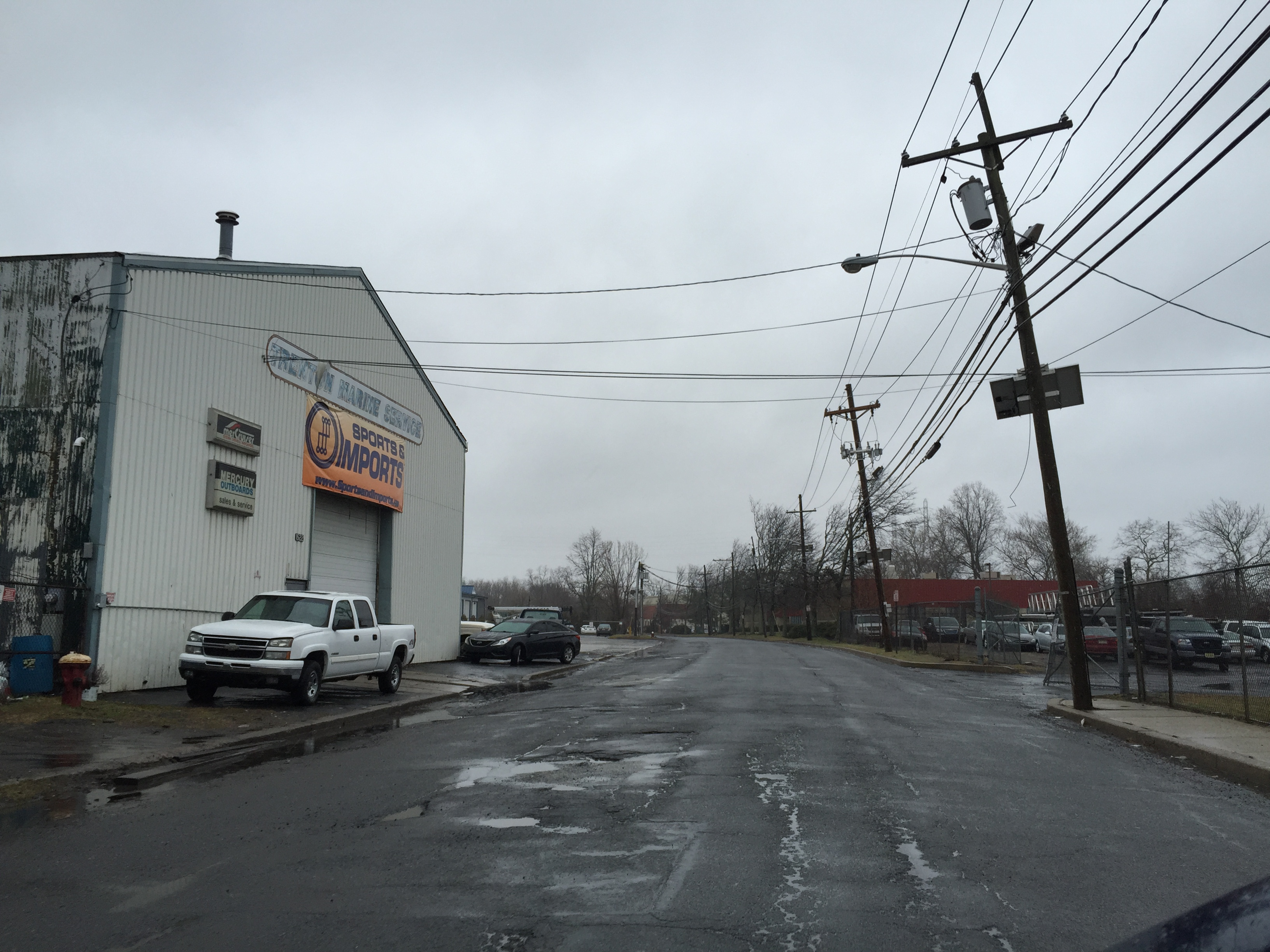
- Lamberton Street in the Duck Island section of Trenton

- Location of Duck Island in Mercer County Inset: Location of county within the state of New Jersey Duck Island (New Jersey) Duck Island (the United States)
- Coordinates: 40°11′18″N 74°45′03″W
- Country: United States
- State: New Jersey
- County: Mercer
- Township and City: Hamilton and Trenton

Duck Island is an unincorporated community located along the border of Hamilton Township and the city of Trenton in Mercer County, in the U.S. state of New Jersey. The community takes its name from Duck Island, which extends southeastward from the community. The city of Trenton provides public docks for fishing in Duck Island.

== The "Duck Island Murders" ==
Duck Island was frequented as a lovers' lane during the 1930s due to its remoteness and nearness to Trenton. Between 1938 and 1942, couples were robbed and murdered on the island, resulting in six deaths. Clarence Hill, motivated by sexual and voyeuristic urges, was arrested for the murders and sentenced to life in prison.

== Incinerator ==
In 1996, there were plans to build a $260 million trash incinerator on Duck Island, but the proposal was defeated by the Mercer County Board of Chosen Freeholders.
