= Echo Lake (North Conway) =

Water body in Carroll County, New Hampshire

- View from state park beach: Whitehorse Ledge (L) and Cathedral Ledge (R)

- Location within New Hampshire Location within the United States
- Location: Carroll County, New Hampshire
- Coordinates: 44°3′18″N 71°9′39″W
- Primary outflows: Elm Brook
- Basin countries: United States
- Max. length: 0.3 mi (0.5 km)
- Max. width: 0.1 mi (0.2 km)
- Surface area: 15.7 acres (6.4 ha)
- Average depth: 7 ft (2.1 m)
- Max. depth: 10 ft (3.0 m)
- Surface elevation: 480 ft (146 m)
- Settlements: Town of Conway

Echo Lake is a 15.7-acre (6.4 ha) water body located near North Conway in Carroll County, New Hampshire, United States. It is part of Echo Lake State Park, which features a small swimming beach.

The lake lies at the foot of White Horse Ledge and just south of Cathedral Ledge, both of which are noted rock climbing destinations in the White Mountains of New Hampshire. The lake is part of the Saco River watershed.

The lake is classified as a warmwater fishery, with observed species including smallmouth bass and yellow perch.

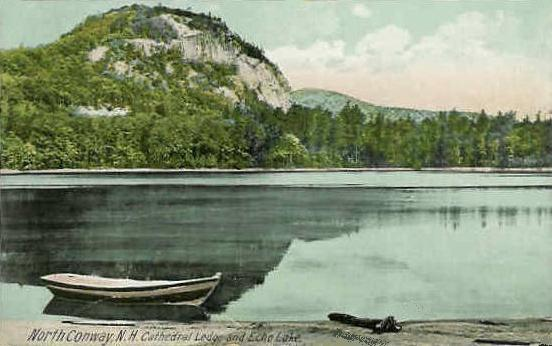
The lake with Cathedral Ledge in 1914

== See also ==
- List of lakes in New Hampshire
