= Duck River =

Duck River may refer to:

== Australia ==
- Duck River (New South Wales), a tributary of the Parramatta River
- Duck River (Tasmania)

== Canada ==
- Duck River (Minganie), Rivière-au-Tonnerre, in Minganie Regional County Municipality, Côte-Nord, Quebec

== United States ==
- Duck River (Alabama), a tributary of the Mulberry Fork of the Black Warrior River
- Duck River (Connecticut), a tidal river in Old Lyme
- Duck River (Michigan)
- Duck River (Tennessee), a tributary of the Tennessee River

== See also ==
- Little Duck River, Tennessee
- Black Duck River (disambiguation)
- Duck (disambiguation)
