= Duck Lake (Nova Scotia) =

Duck Lake (Nova Scotia) could mean the following :

== Cape Breton Regional Municipality ==
- Duck Lake at 45°47′49″N 60°26′14″W

== Colchester County ==
- Duck Lake at 45°22′33″N 62°59′46″W

== Digby County ==
- Duck Lake at 44°25′51″N 65°45′13″W

== Guysborough County ==
- Duck Lake at 45°11′7″N 61°23′5″W

== Halifax Regional Municipality ==
- Duck Lake at 44°43′51″N 63°22′43″W
- Duck Lake at 44°55′15″N 62°46′27″W
- Duck Lake at 44°53′55″N 63°5′1″W
- Duck Lake at 44°53′1″N 63°12′49″W
- Duck Lake at 44°52′36″N 62°56′46″W
- Duck Lake at 44°50′47″N 63°40′59″W
- Duck Lake at 44°48′19″N 63°40′58″W
- Duck Lake at 44°47′51″N 63°14′8″W
- Duck Lake at 44°47′24″N 63°29′21″W
- Duck Lake at 44°41′52″N 63°21′26″W
- Duck Lake at 44°41′48″N 63°1′55″W
- Duck Lake at 44°32′2″N 63°43′35″W
- Duck Lake at 45°0′10″N 62°51′14″W

== Pictou County ==
- Duck Lake at 45°21′59″N 62°32′57″W

== Region of Queens Municipality ==
- Duck Lake at 43°47′41″N 64°54′17″W

== Lunenburg County ==
- Duck Lake at 44°40′52″N 64°29′53″W

== Victoria County ==
- Duck Lake at 46°44′5″N 60°30′22″W

== Yarmouth County ==
- Duck Lake at 44°7′13″N 65°33′52″W
- Duck Lake at 44°5′15″N 65°51′4″W
- Duck Lake at 43°51′28″N 65°54′53″W
- Duck Lakes at 44°5′54″N 65°49′15″W
