= Duck Lake (Vancouver Island) =

Lake on Vancouver Island in British Columbia, Canada

- Location within Vancouver Island
- Location: Vancouver Island, British Columbia
- Coordinates: 49°08′29″N 124°39′26″W
- Lake type: Natural lake
- Basin countries: Canada
- Surface elevation: 928 m (3,045 ft)

Duck Lake is a lake located on Vancouver Island east of Lizard Lake on the south side of upper China Creek, south east of Port Alberni, The lake lies at an elevation of 928 metres (3,045 ft) above sea level in the China Creek Community Watershed.

== See also ==
- List of lakes of British Columbia
