= Echo Lake State Park =

State park in Carroll County, New Hampshire

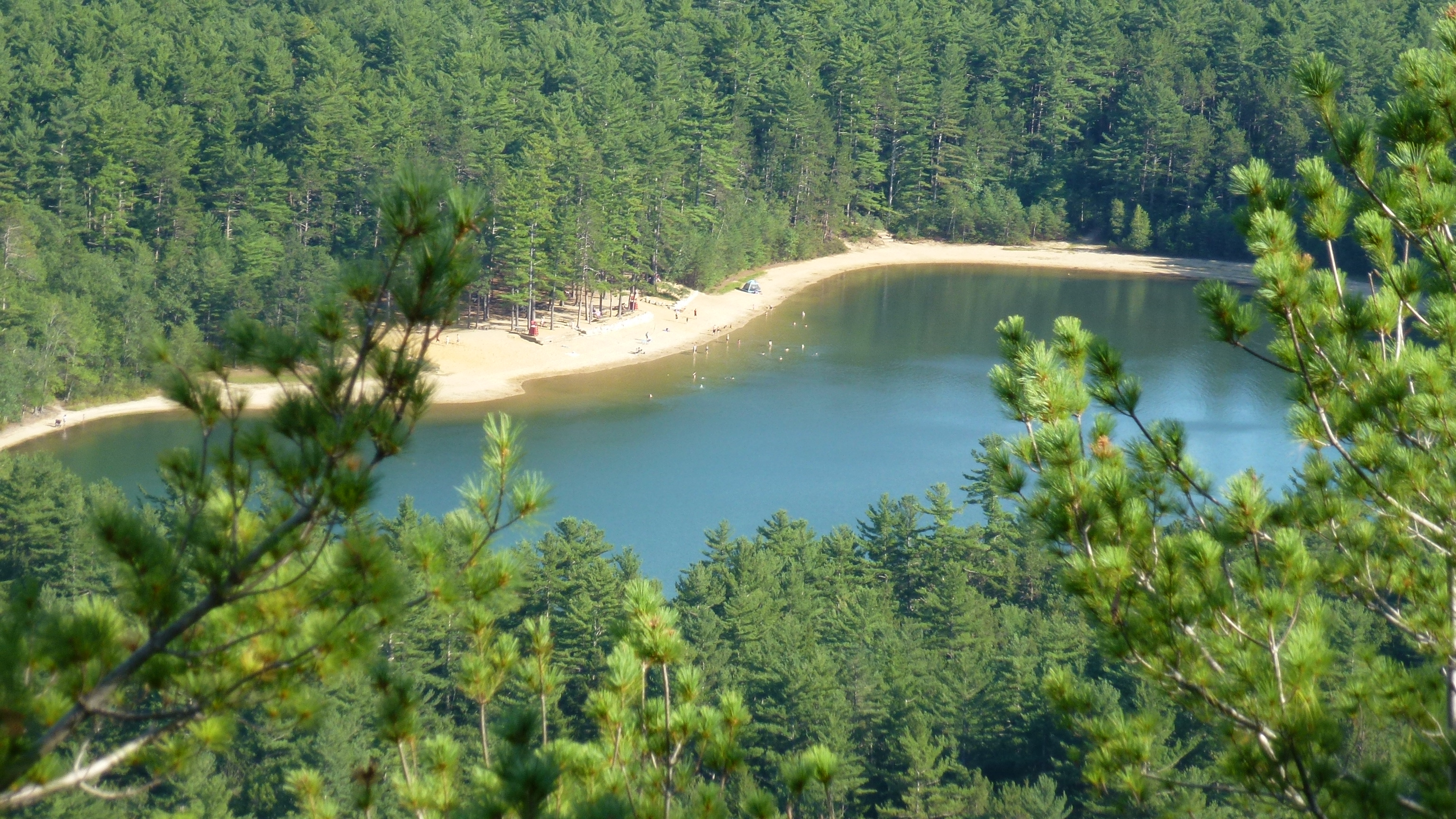
- Echo Lake from Cathedral Ledge

- Location within New Hampshire
- Interactive map of Echo Lake State Park
- Location: North Conway, New Hampshire, United States
- Coordinates: 44°03′11″N 71°09′25″W
- Elevation: 476 feet (145 m)
- Established: 1943
- Administrator: New Hampshire Division of Parks and Recreation
- Website: Official website
- New Hampshire State Parks

Echo Lake State Park is a public recreation area in North Conway, New Hampshire, that features 15.7-acre (6.4 ha) Echo Lake and two rock ledges with scenic views, Cathedral Ledge and White Horse Ledge. Activities include swimming, hiking, non-motorized boating, picnicking and fishing. There is a one-mile trail around the lake.

A mile-long auto road and hiking trails lead to the top of Cathedral Ledge (summit elevation 1,159 ft or 353 m) with views across the Saco River Valley to the White Mountains and Kearsarge North.

Both Cathedral Ledge and White Horse Ledge are popular for rock and ice climbing.

== History ==
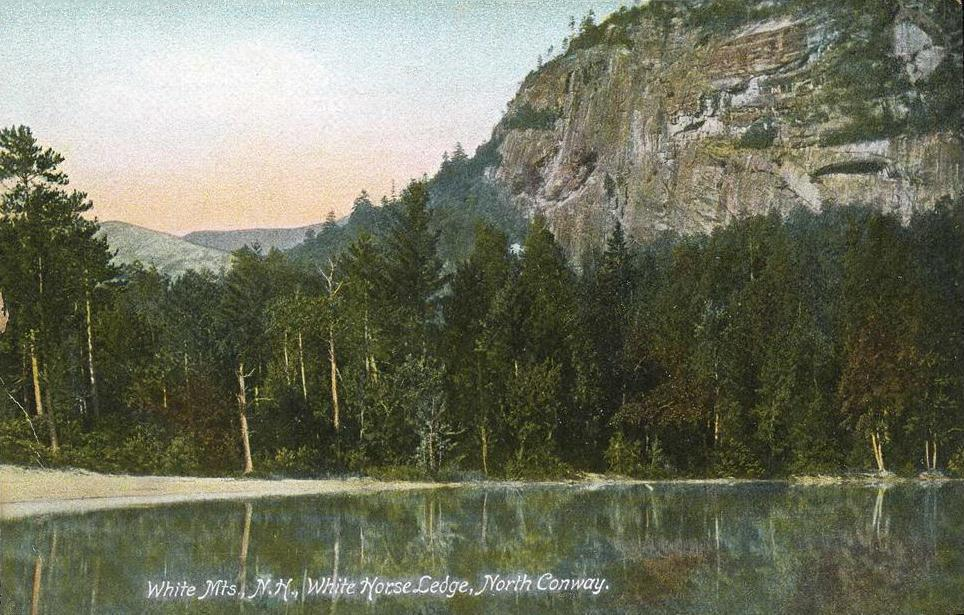
Echo Lake and White Horse Ledge from a 1908 postcard

In 1899, Cathedral Ledge was purchased for $1,000 by a group of area visitors and local residents, and in 1900, White Horse Ledge was purchased. Both were later deeded to the State of New Hampshire. In 1943, the Society for the Protection of New Hampshire Forests joined with the state to raise funds to buy Echo Lake, protecting it from commercial development.
