= Black Duck River (Newfoundland and Labrador) =

- Location of the mouth of the Black Duck River in Newfoundland and Labrador

Location
- Country: Canada
- Province: Newfoundland and Labrador
- District: St. Mary's Bay

Physical characteristics
- Source: Marsh
  - coordinates: 47°13′52″N 53°32′43″W
  - elevation: 48 m (157 ft)
- Mouth: Rocky River
  - coordinates: 47°13′29″N 53°33′56″W
  - elevation: 2 m (6 ft 7 in)

Basin features
- River system: Atlantic Ocean drainage basin

The Black Duck River is a short river in St. Mary's Bay, on the Avalon Peninsula, Newfoundland and Labrador, Canada. It flows from its source through the Black Duck Ponds to its mouth at the Rocky River, near the community of Colinet, just upstream of that river's mouth at St. Mary's Bay on the Atlantic Ocean.

Mouth of the Black Duck River
