= Ducking (slang) =

Prison slang term

"Ducking" is a prison slang term for a technique through which prisoners modify the behavior of correctional officers and other prison staff members using manipulation and coercion. The prison slang term for a prison staff member that has been manipulated is a "duck".

Ducking occurs when a prisoner becomes friendly with a prison staff member and then persuades the employee to break prison rules and laws. The prisoner then provokes the staff member (or members) into breaking an increasing number of prison guidelines until the staff member can be effectively blackmailed by the prisoner. At such point, the "duck" in prison parlance is said to be "downed". Ducking is perceived to be a threat to hierarchal stability in prisons. For this reason, volunteers at San Quentin State Prison are given an anonymously authored eight-page pamphlet describing ducking techniques entitled Downing a Duck (An Inmate's Version) during training in addition to the standard volunteer handbook.

It is thought that Joyce Mitchell and Gene Palmer, employees of the Clinton Correctional Facility in Dannemora, New York, were perhaps ducked by Richard Matt and David Sweat in the 2015 Clinton Correctional Facility escape. The concept of ducking is also discussed in the 2019 film Heartlock.
