= Echo Lake (Montana) =

Small water body in Flathead County

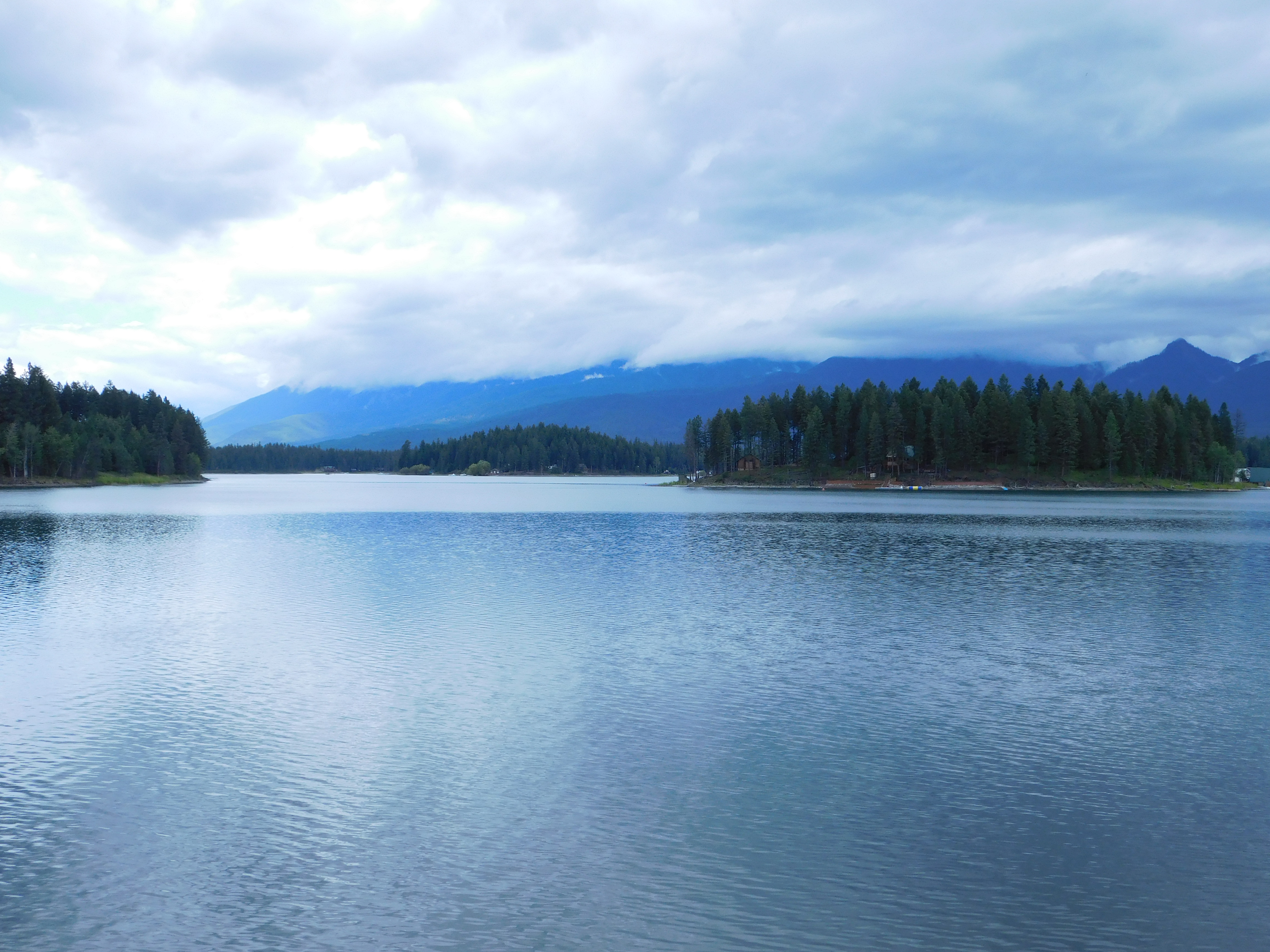

- Location in Montana
- Location: Flathead County, Montana, United States
- Coordinates: 48°07′37″N 114°02′28″W
- Basin countries: United States
- Max. length: 2 mi (3.2 km)
- Max. width: 1.5 mi (2.4 km)
- Surface area: 695.2 acres (281.3 ha)
- Max. depth: 80 ft (24 m)
- Shore length^{1}: 15.5 mi (24.9 km)
- Surface elevation: 3,047 ft (929 m)
- Islands: Deer Island
- Settlements: Bigfork
- ^{1} Shore length is not a well-defined measure.

Echo Lake is a small lake in the Flathead Valley in the U.S. state of Montana. It is located five miles from Bigfork and 25 miles from Kalispell. The lake is filled with groundwater and a small amount of mountain runoff from Echo Creek, making it one of the warmest lakes in the Flathead Valley. The lake is next to the Swan Range and the Jewel Basin hiking area. Echo Lake also is connected to two smaller lakes, Abbot Lake and Peterson Lake, by a canal.

Echo Lake is popular among motorboaters because of its warm water. It is very common to see boats and personal watercraft in the summer. The lake is also popular among anglers due to its many coves and large numbers of fish, such as perch, pumpkinseed, largemouth bass, and northern pike.

Much of the lake is surrounded by private lakefront property, including residences.

== Sediments ==
Echo lake is fed primarily by groundwater flow from glacial outwash gravel. This outwash comes from the Swan Valley sub-lobe of the Flathead Glacial lobe of the Cordilleran Ice Sheet. The Gravel allows for easy flow from the upper portions of the Swan Valley. This gravel comes to contact with the surface around the area of Echo and Mud lake, and ends north of Lake Blaine. This outwash creates a series of "pothole lakes", Spill lake, Lake of the Woods, McGilvary Lake, Double Lake, and many more. While groundwater is the main source of water for Echo Lake, a small Echo Creek also fills into the Lake, which is sourced by mountain runoff. Despite this creek being a small part of the overall water source for Echo Lake, it can cause large increases or decreases in water level when the stream flows high or low respectively. There are rumors around the lake that the creek is manipulated by upstream landowners causing floods or droughts in the lake, but these claims are unproven.

== See also ==
- List of lakes in Flathead County, Montana (A-L)
