= Duckie =

Duckie can mean:

- An informal word for a rubber duck
- Duckie, a character from Pretty in Pink
- Duckie (group), a London-based collective of performance artists
- Derrick "Duckie" Simpson, founding member of reggae band Black Uhuru
- Duckie Thot, an Australian model

== See also ==
- Ducky (disambiguation)
- Duck (disambiguation)
