= Duck Creek (Upper Castor River tributary) =

Stream in the American state of Missouri

Coordinates: 37.011996°N 90.047319°W

Duck Creek is a stream in Stoddard County in the U.S. state of Missouri. It is a tributary of Upper Castor River.

Duck Creek was so named on account of ducks in the area.

== See also ==
- List of rivers of Missouri
