= Overlook Mountain =

Mountain in New York, United States

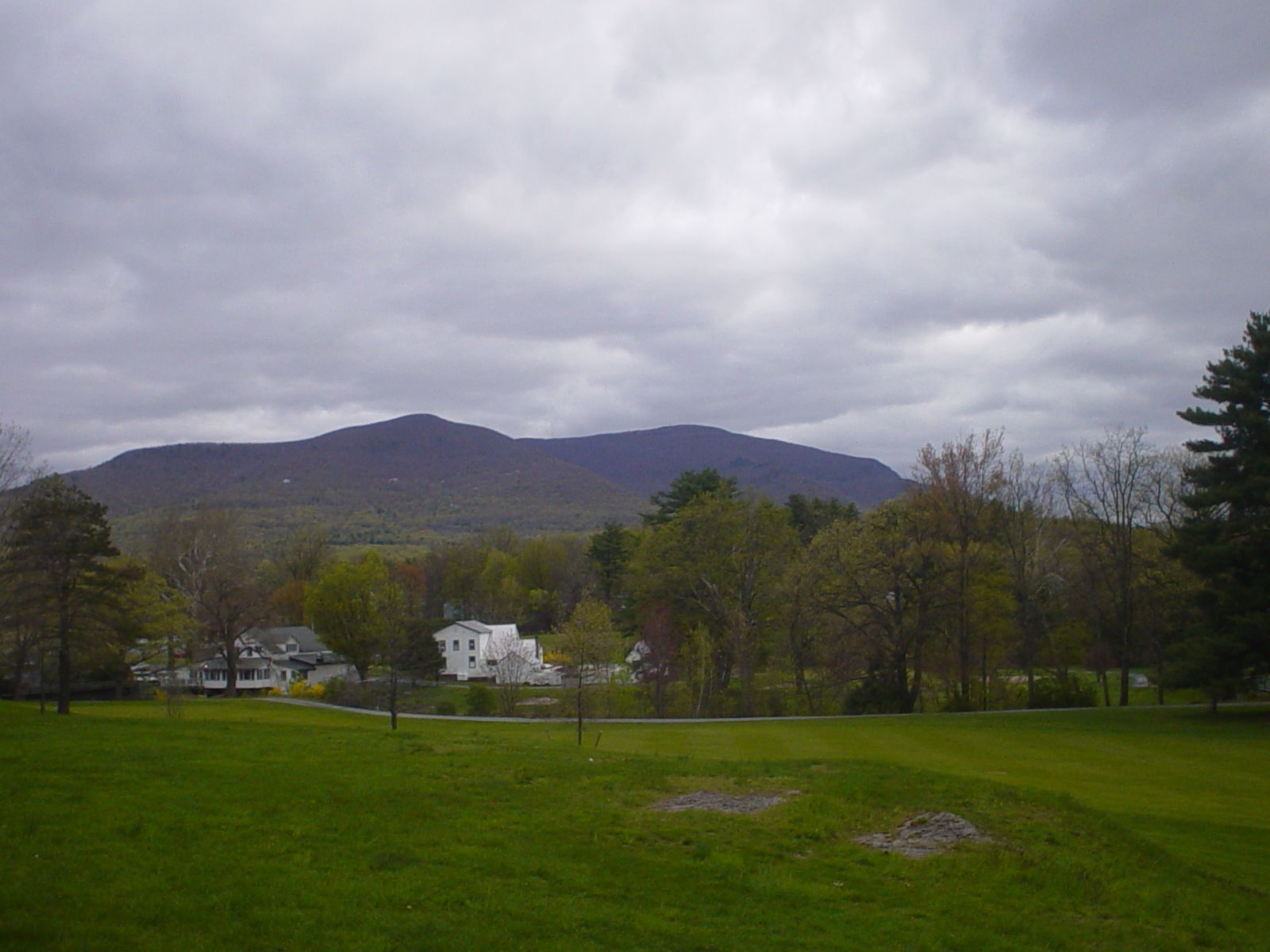
- Overlook Mountain's south face, April 2010. Fire tower is visible on Overlook's peak, on the right.

Highest point
- Elevation: 3,136 ft (956 m)
- Prominence: 620 ft (190 m)
- Listing: Catskill Top 102 70th; Fire Tower Challenge (Adirondack/Catskill) 13th
- Coordinates: 42°05′06″N 74°05′36″W

Geography
- Location within New York
- Location: Woodstock, New York
- Parent range: Catskill Mountains

Climbing
- First ascent: Peter delaBigarre and companion; July 26, 1793

Overlook Mountain is the southernmost peak of the Catskill Escarpment in the central Catskill Mountains near Woodstock, New York. The centerpiece of the 590-acre (240 ha) Overlook Mountain Wild Forest area of Catskill Park, the mountain is the site of one of the remaining five Catskill Mountain fire towers and the Overlook Mountain House, a hotel which was built at a higher elevation than any other in the range.

== Natural history ==
Overlook Mountain is the southernmost peak of the Catskill Escarpment, which was formed of limestone bedrock by a period of glaciation. It is one of the timber rattlesnake habitats in the Catskills. The summit is covered with red oak, red spruce, and balsam fir trees.

== Cultural history ==
Overlook Mountain was the site of one of the "mountain houses" which were constructed in the Catskills during the 1800s. In 1902 its southern slopes became home to the Byrdcliffe Colony, a utopian settlement with an arts focus.

=== Fire tower ===
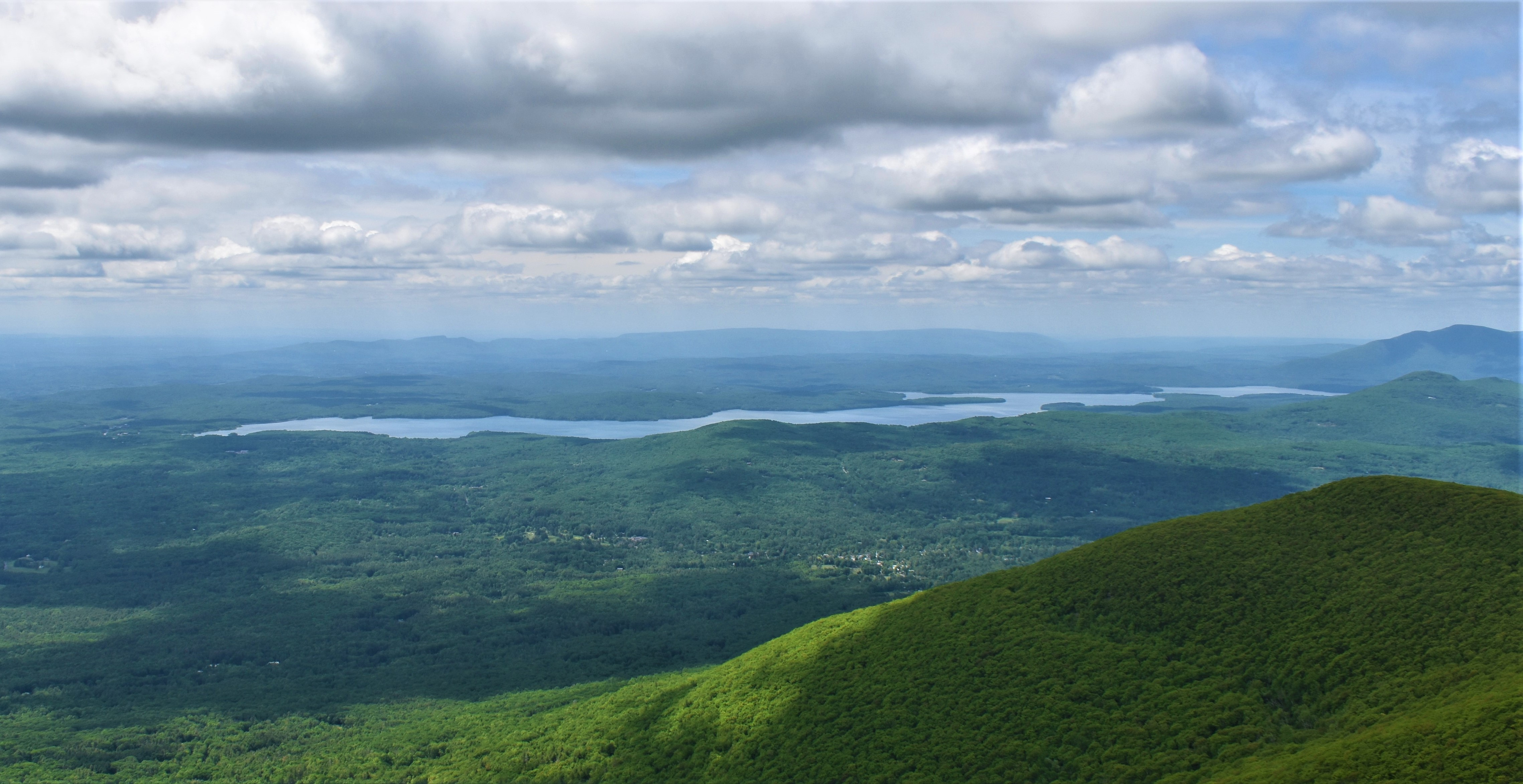
View of Ashokan Reservoir from the Overlook Mountain Fire Tower

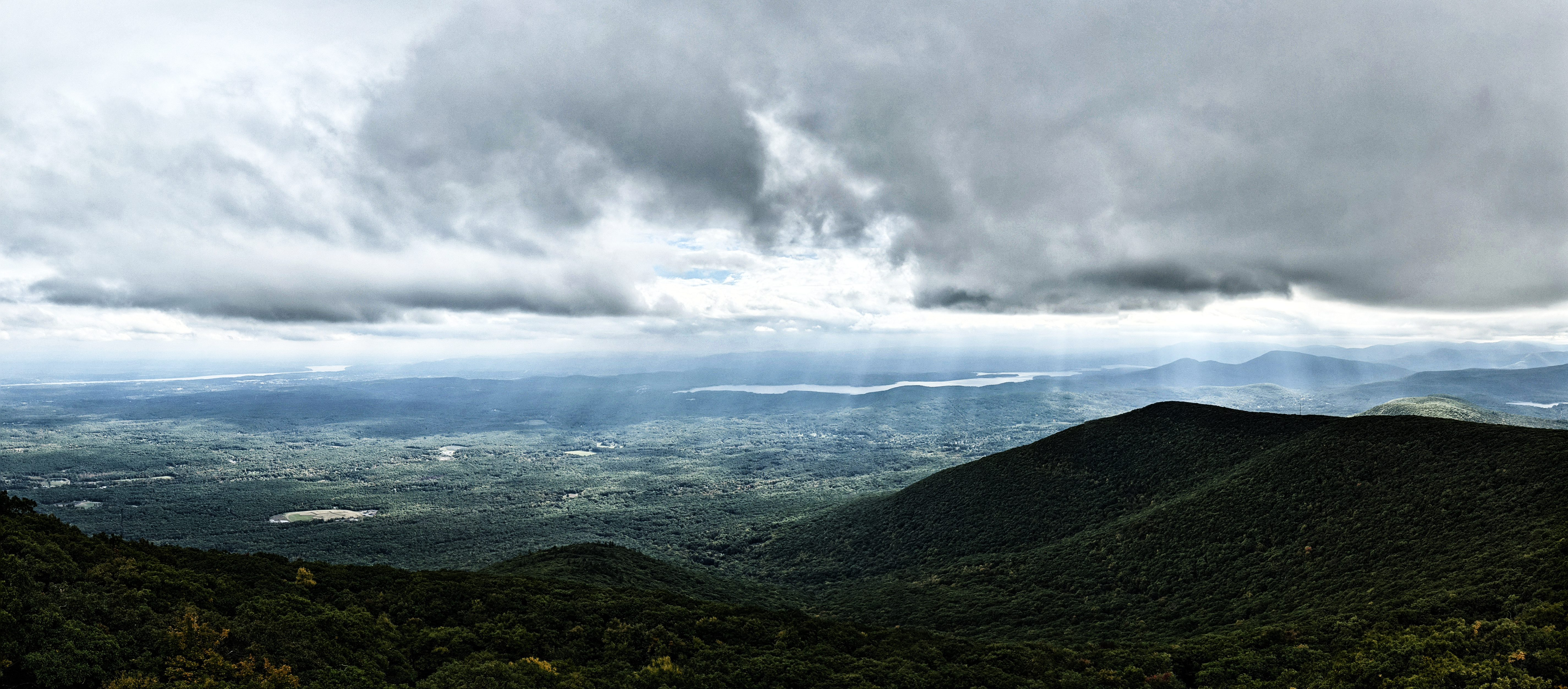
View From Overlook Mountain Fire Tower

The Overlook fire tower was originally constructed in 1927 on Gallis Hill, west of Kingston, New York, and was moved to its present location in 1950. The 60-foot (18.3 m) tower was used by fire stewards to more easily locate wildfires. The tower, along with the others in the Catskills, were closed for safety reasons in 1988. Overlook's tower was the first to reopen after renovations were completed, on June 5, 1999.

=== Mountain House ===
The first dream of a hotel on the mountain was a shack in 1833 to show investors the amazing views, as interest in tourism in the area increased. The structure was built with the intention to build a hotel, to compete with the Catskill Mountain House. The Overlook Mountain House, owned by Robert Livingston Pell and designed by Lewis B. Wagonen, opened in 1871. At 2,920 feet (890 m), it was at a higher elevation than the nearby Catskill Mountain House or other hotels in the area. The hotel had capacity for 300 guests, and was destroyed by fire in 1875. The hotel was rebuilt by the Kiersted Brothers in 1875, and faced increasing competition from the Grand Hotel, Hotel Kaaterskill, and Laurel House. The hotel again burned down in 1923, and architect Frank P. Amato was hired by owner Morris Newgold to redesign and rebuild it. This design was never completely built, as the hotel's elevation and lack of rail transportation made it difficult for customers to reach the site, compounding owner Newgold's financial difficulties. The State of New York acquired much of the land, and the hotel was boarded up in 1940. Further fire damage in the mid-1960s brought down a rooftop tower which had remained standing until that point. The ruins of the hotel are accessible from the main trail.

Ruins of Overlook Mountain House
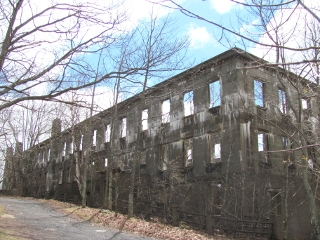
The ruins of Overlook Mountain House have no roof and significant tree growth inside.

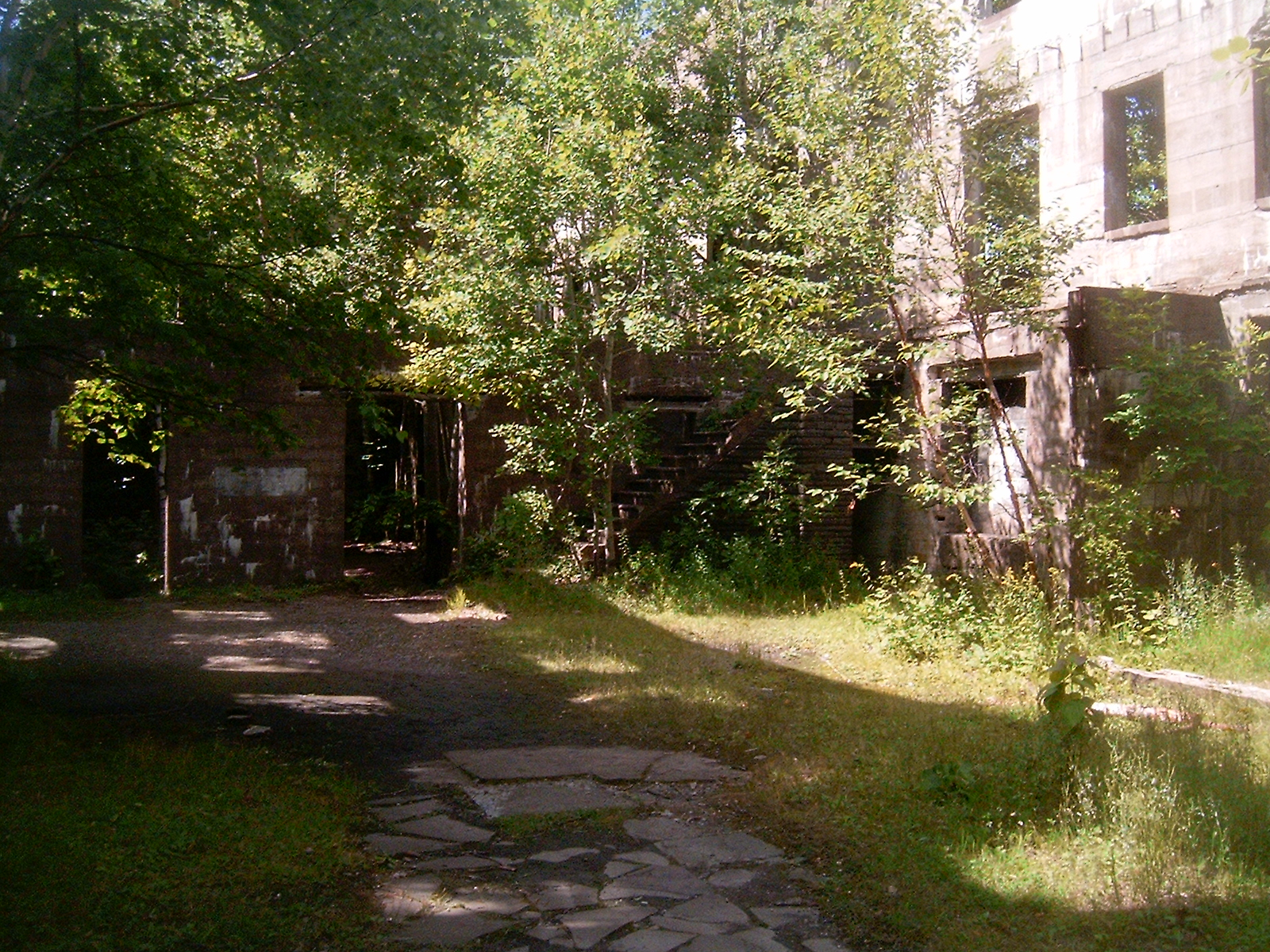
Courtyard of the Overlook Mountain House.

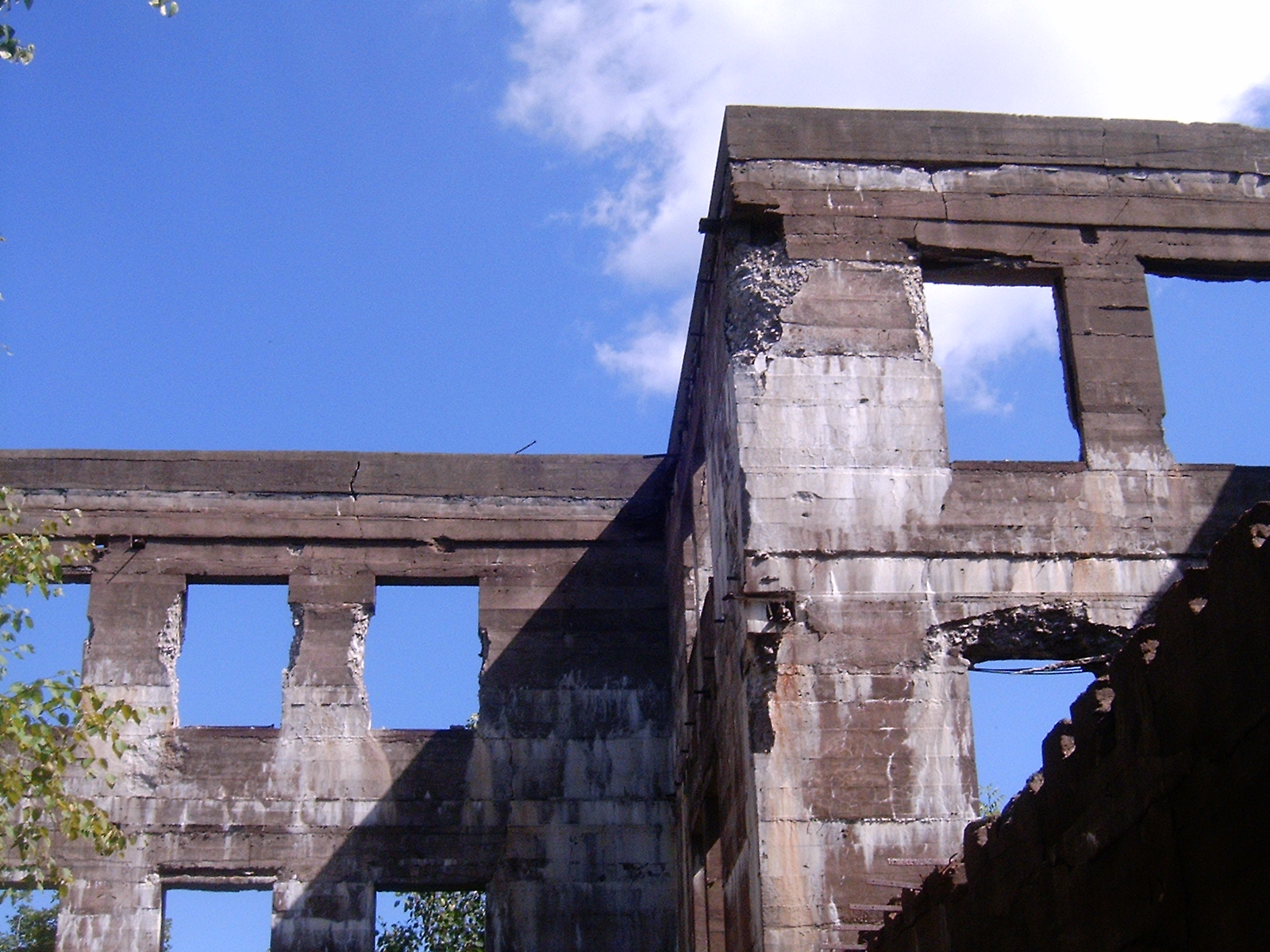
Wall of the Overlook Mountain House. The roof was destroyed by fire.

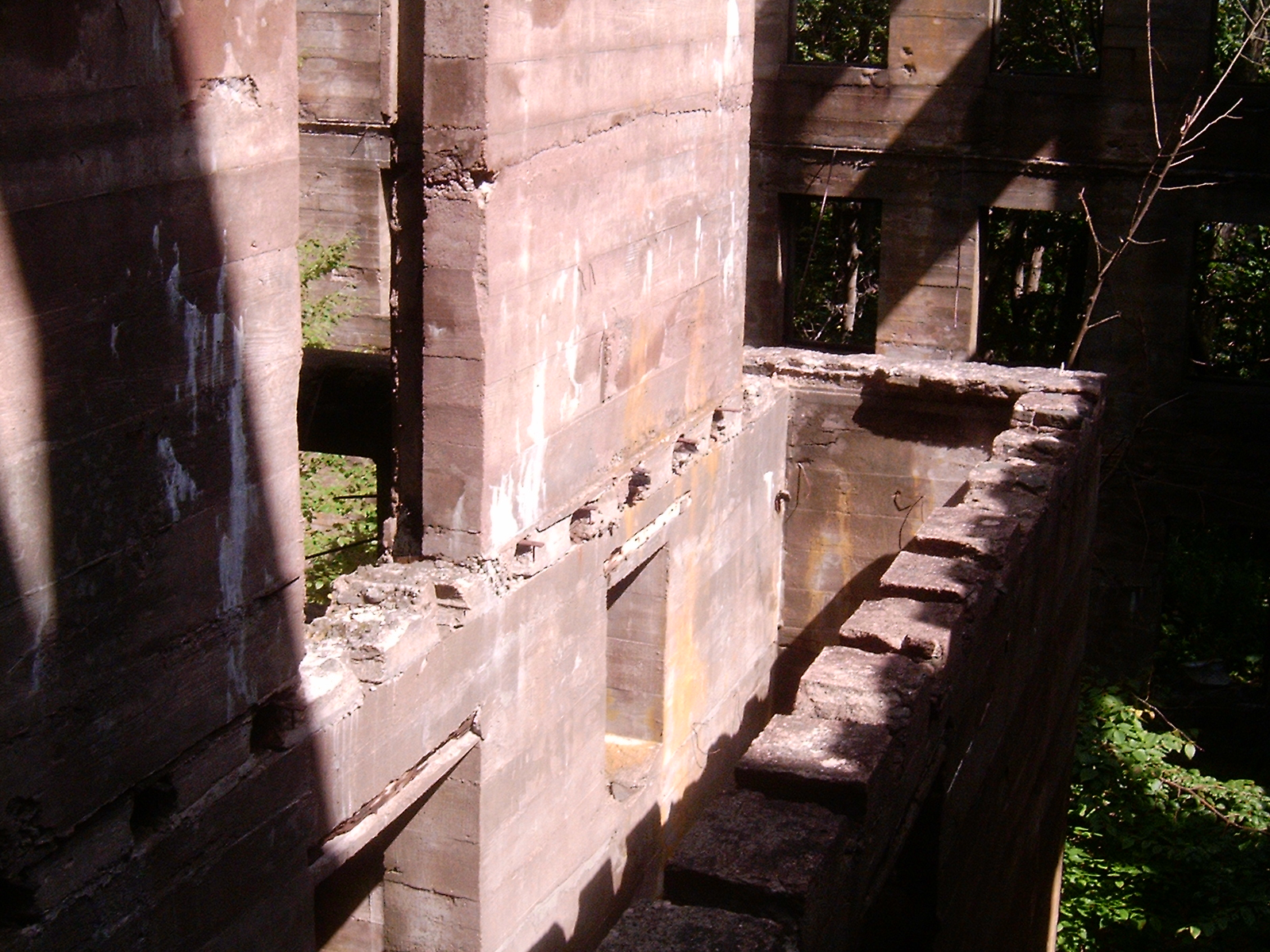
Most of the floors of the Overlook Mountain House no longer exist.

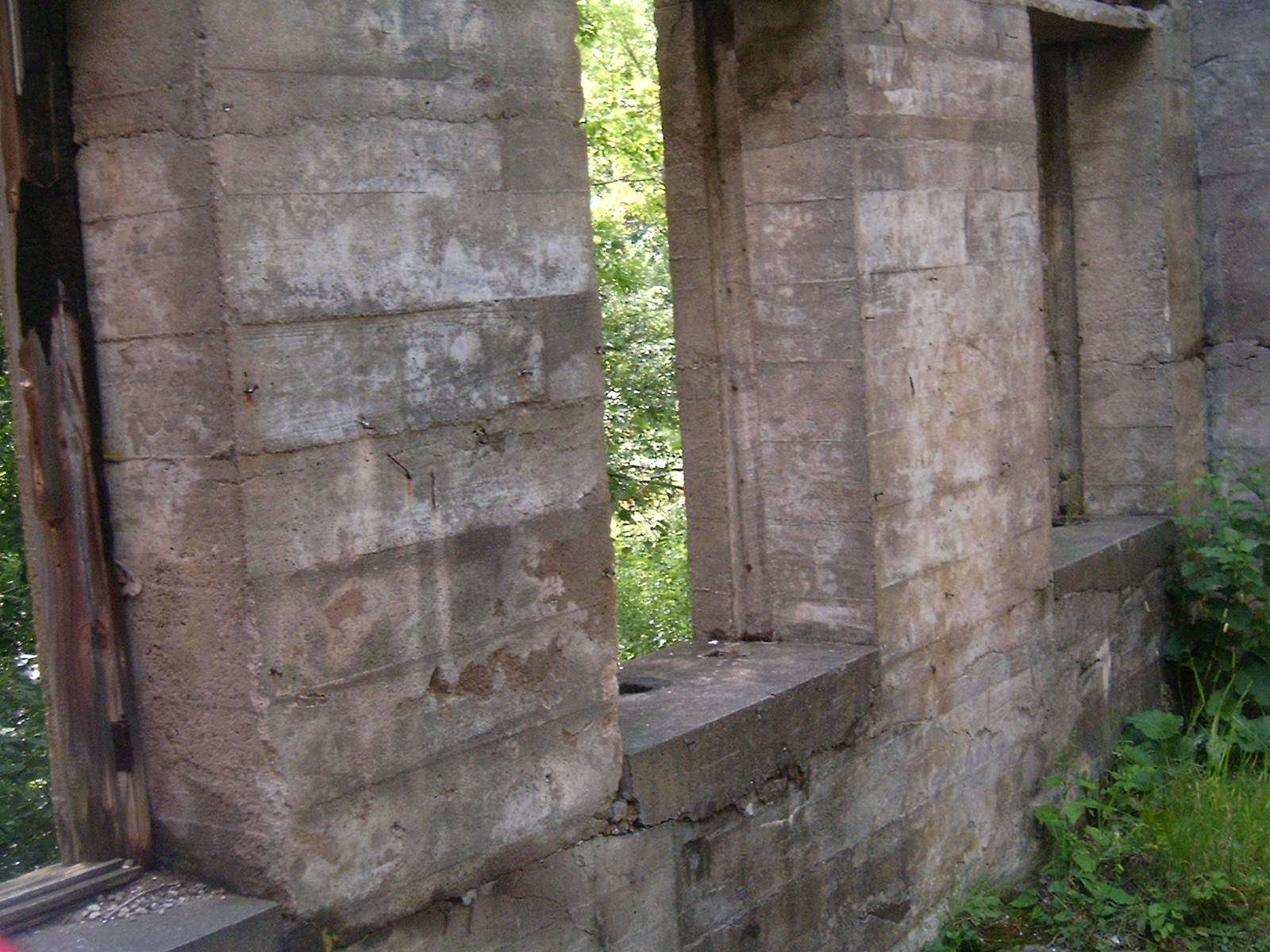
The ruins consist mostly of the walls of the Mountain House.

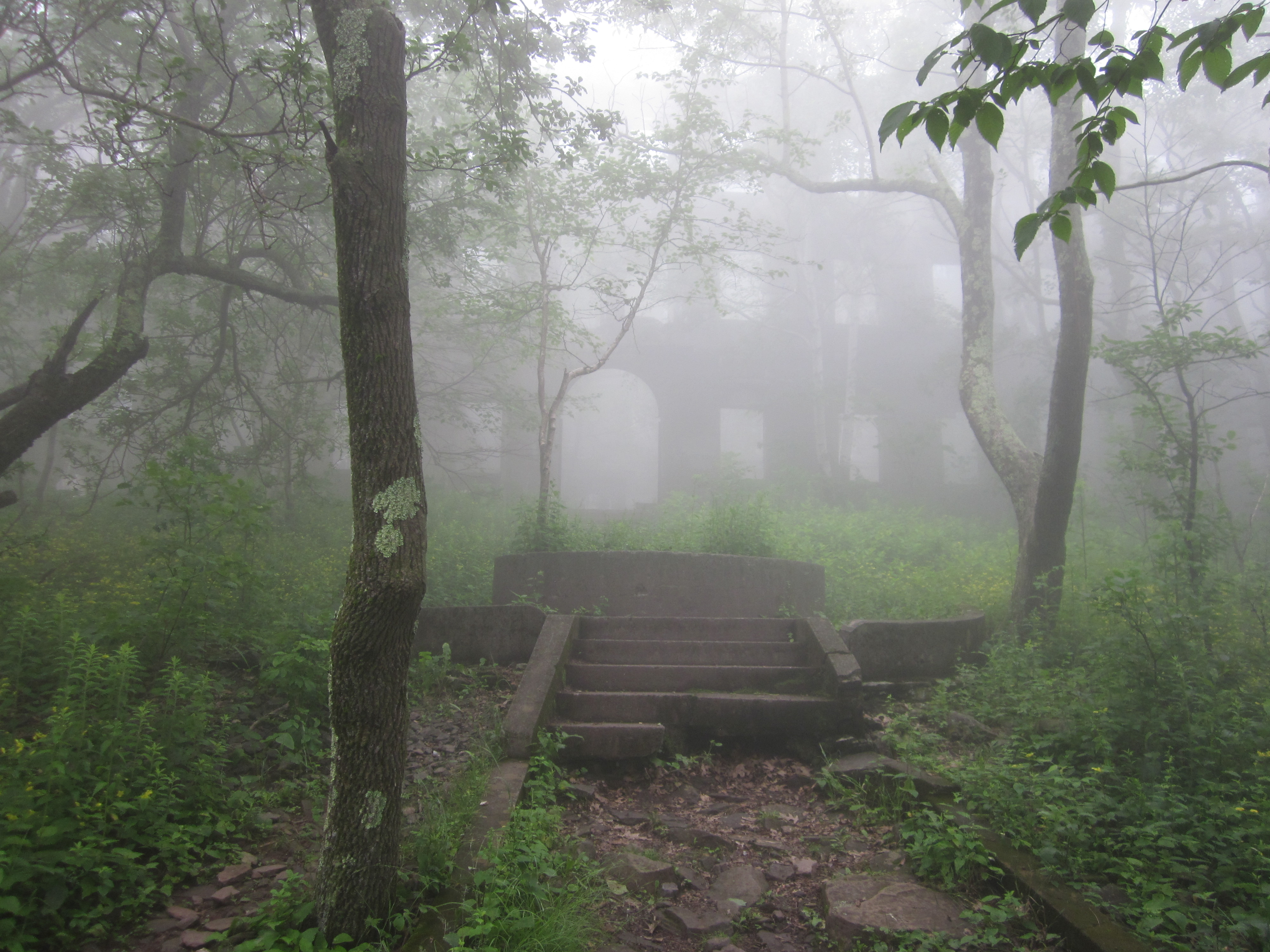
First view of the Overlook Mountain House on a foggy day

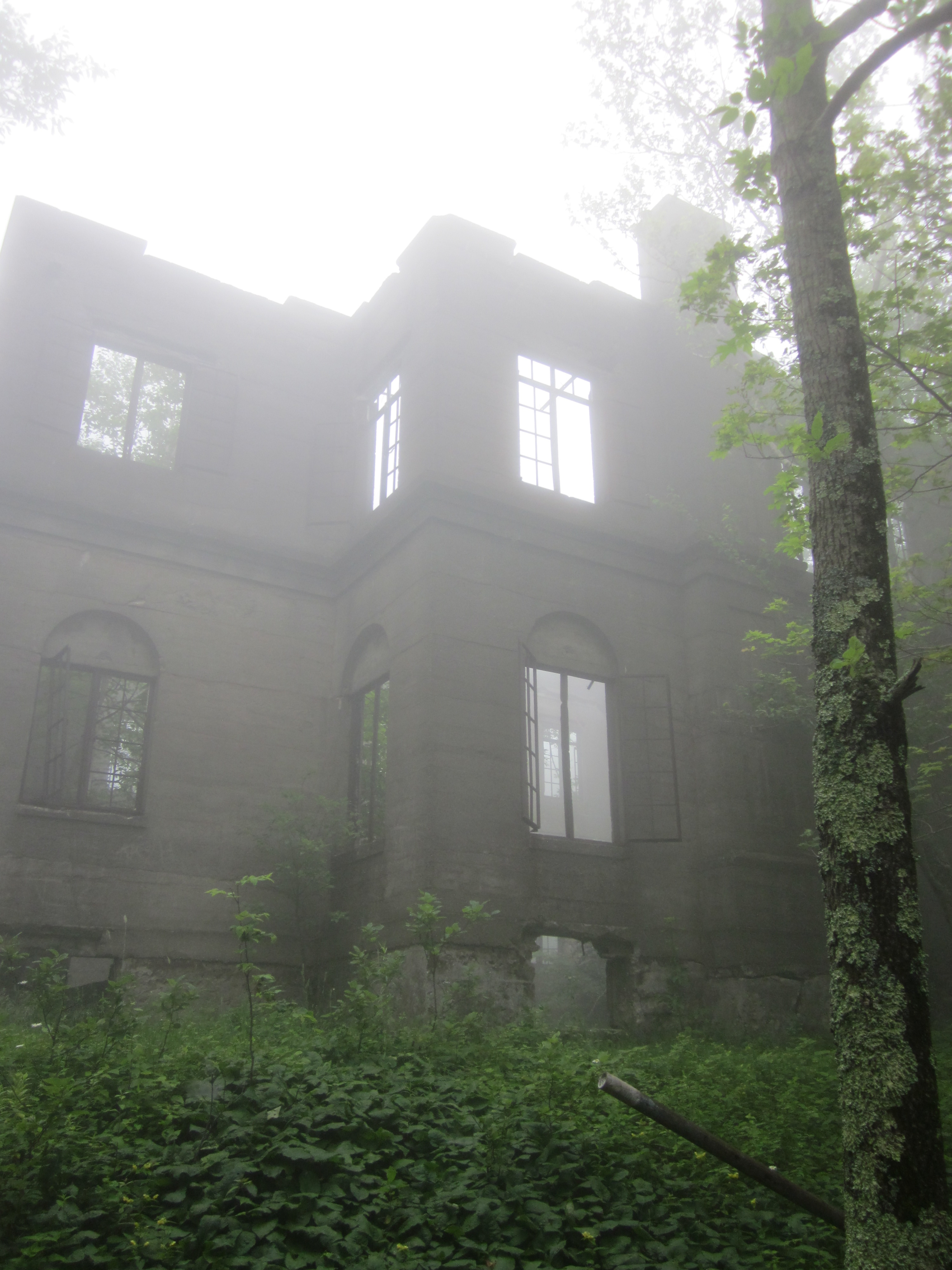
A view of the Mountain House on a foggy day

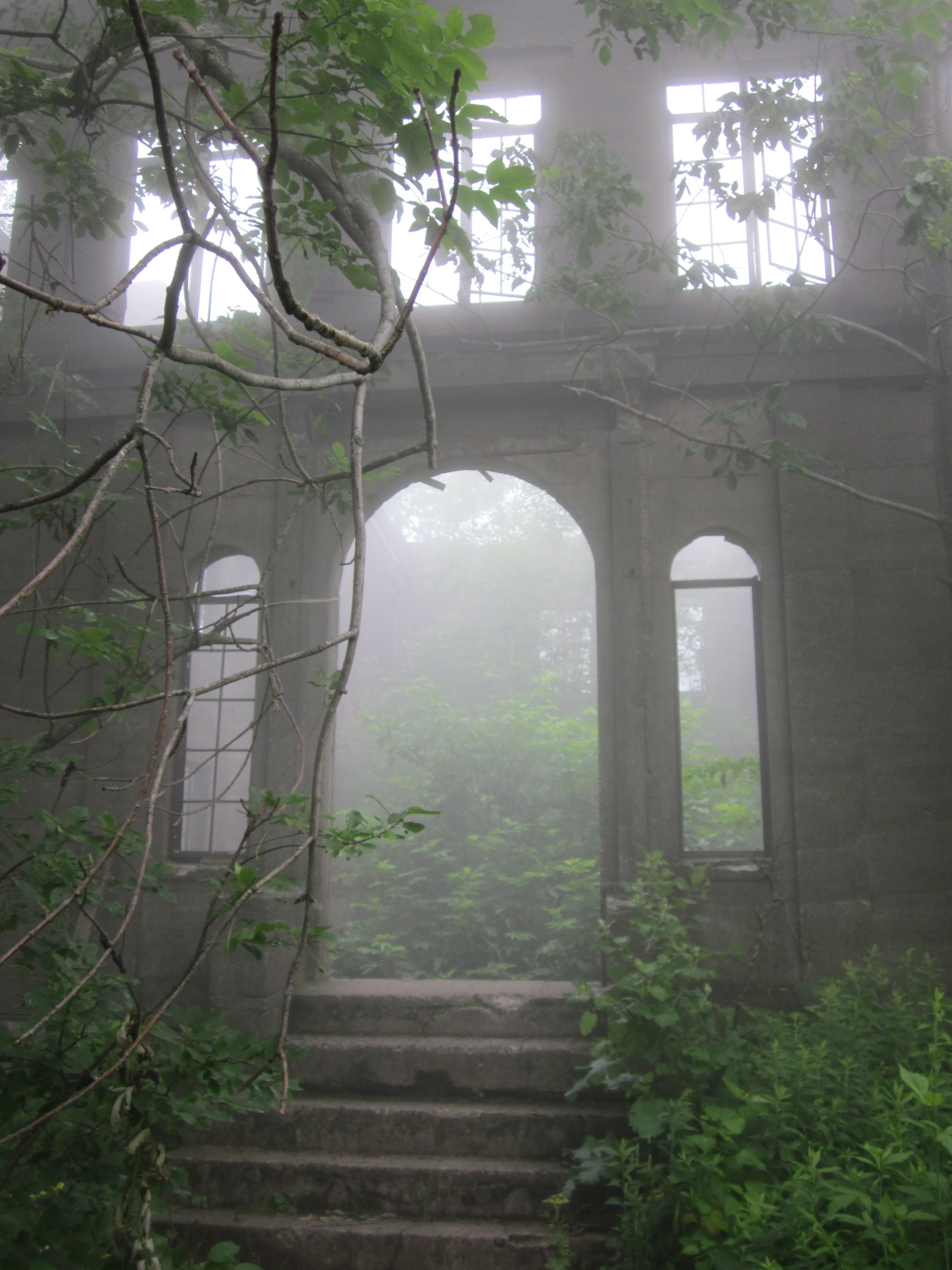
Nature is slowly reclaiming the entire structure
