= Ducky (disambiguation) =

Ducky is a real-life nickname and a fictional given name. It may also refer to:

- Ján Ducký, Slovak politician and oligarch
- Ducky, a Taiwanese brand of keyboard - see List of mechanical keyboards
- "Ducky", an episode of the web series Where's My Water?: Swampy's Underground Adventures
- Ducky, a character in The Land Before Time series of animated films
- Dr. Donald "Ducky" Mallard, a character in the television series NCIS

== See also ==
- Duckie (disambiguation)
